= Ikura Station =

Railway station in Niimi, Okayama Prefecture, Japan

Ikura Station 井倉駅
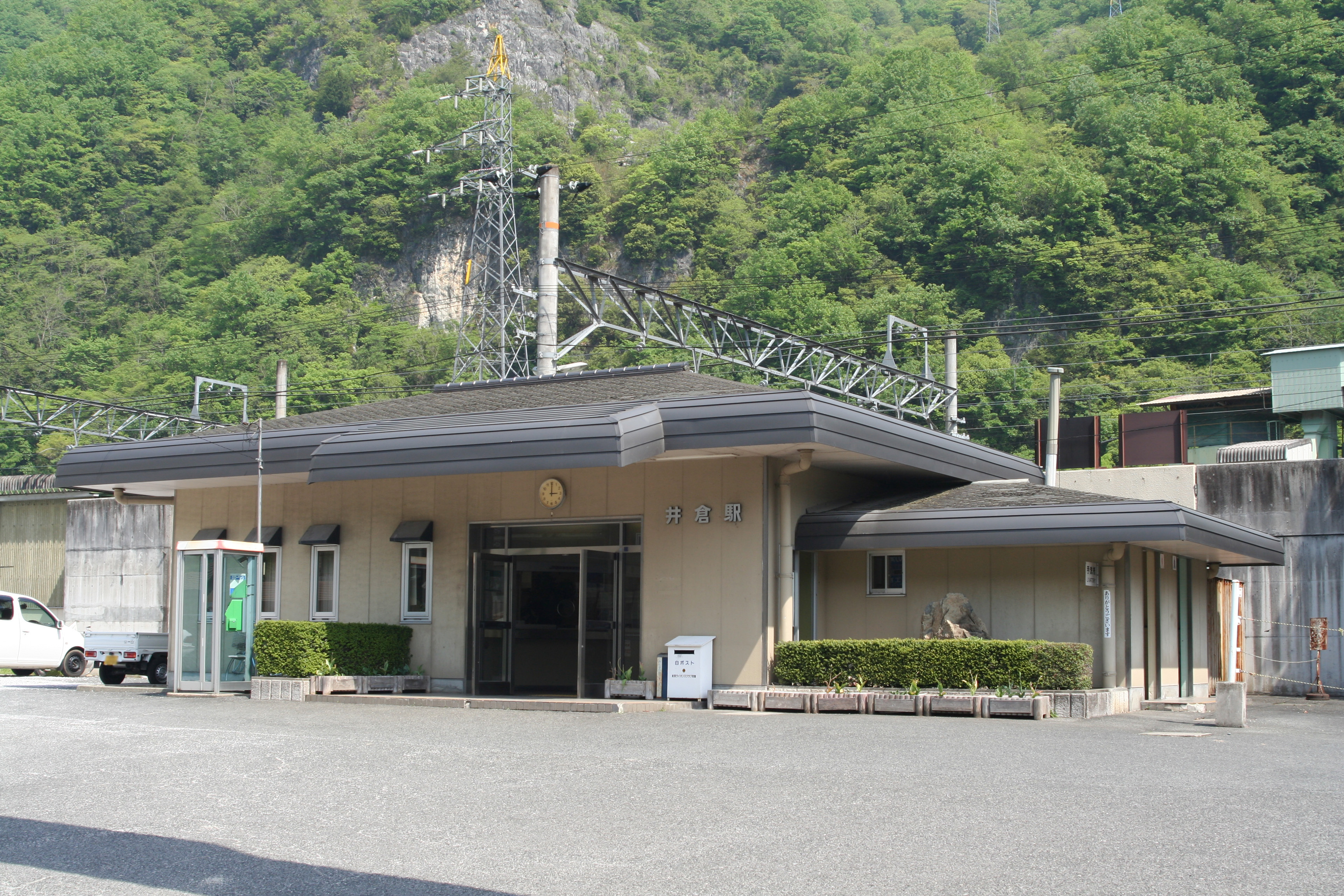
- Ikura Station, May 2007

General information
- Location: 706-4 Ikura, Niimi-shi, Okayama-ken 719-2551; Japan
- Coordinates: 34°55′54.01″N 133°30′58.86″E
- Operator: JR West
- Line: V Hakubi Line
- Distance: 52.2 km (32.4 miles) from Kurashiki
- Platforms: 1 side + 1 island platform
- Tracks: 3

Other information
- Status: Unstaffed
- Station code: JR-V16
- Website: Official website

History
- Opened: 25 October 1928

Passengers
- 2019: 28 daily
Location
- Location within Okayama Prefecture Location within Japan

Ikura Station (井倉駅, Ikura-eki) is a passenger railway station located in the city of Niimi, Okayama Prefecture, Japan. It is operated by the West Japan Railway Company (JR West).

== Lines ==
Ikura Station is served by the Hakubi Line, and is located 52.2 kilometers from the terminus of the line at Kurashiki and 71.1 kilometers from Okayama.

== Station layout ==
The station consists of one side platform and one island platform. The station building is located next to the side platform and connected to the island platform by an underground passage. The station building serves as a tourist information center for the Niimi City Tourist Association; however, the station is unattended.

=== Platforms ===
1, 2	■ V Hakubi Line	for Kurashiki and Okayama
3	■ V Hakubi Line	for Niimi and Yonago

== Adjacent stations ==
«	Service	»
Hakubi Line
Hōkoku	-	Ishiga

== History ==
Ikura Station opened on October 25, 1928. With the privatization of the Japan National Railways (JNR) on April 1, 1987, the station came under the aegis of the West Japan Railway Company.

== Passenger statistics ==
In fiscal 2019, the station was used by an average of 28 passengers daily.

== Surrounding area ==
The station is located at the bottom of Ikurakyo Gorge, which has been eroded by the meandering Takahashi River.

- Ikura-do Caves
- Niimi City Ikura Civic Center
- Japan National Route 180

== See also ==
- List of railway stations in Japan
