= Hōkoku Station =

Railway station in Takahashi, Okayama Prefecture, Japan

Hōkoku Station 方谷駅
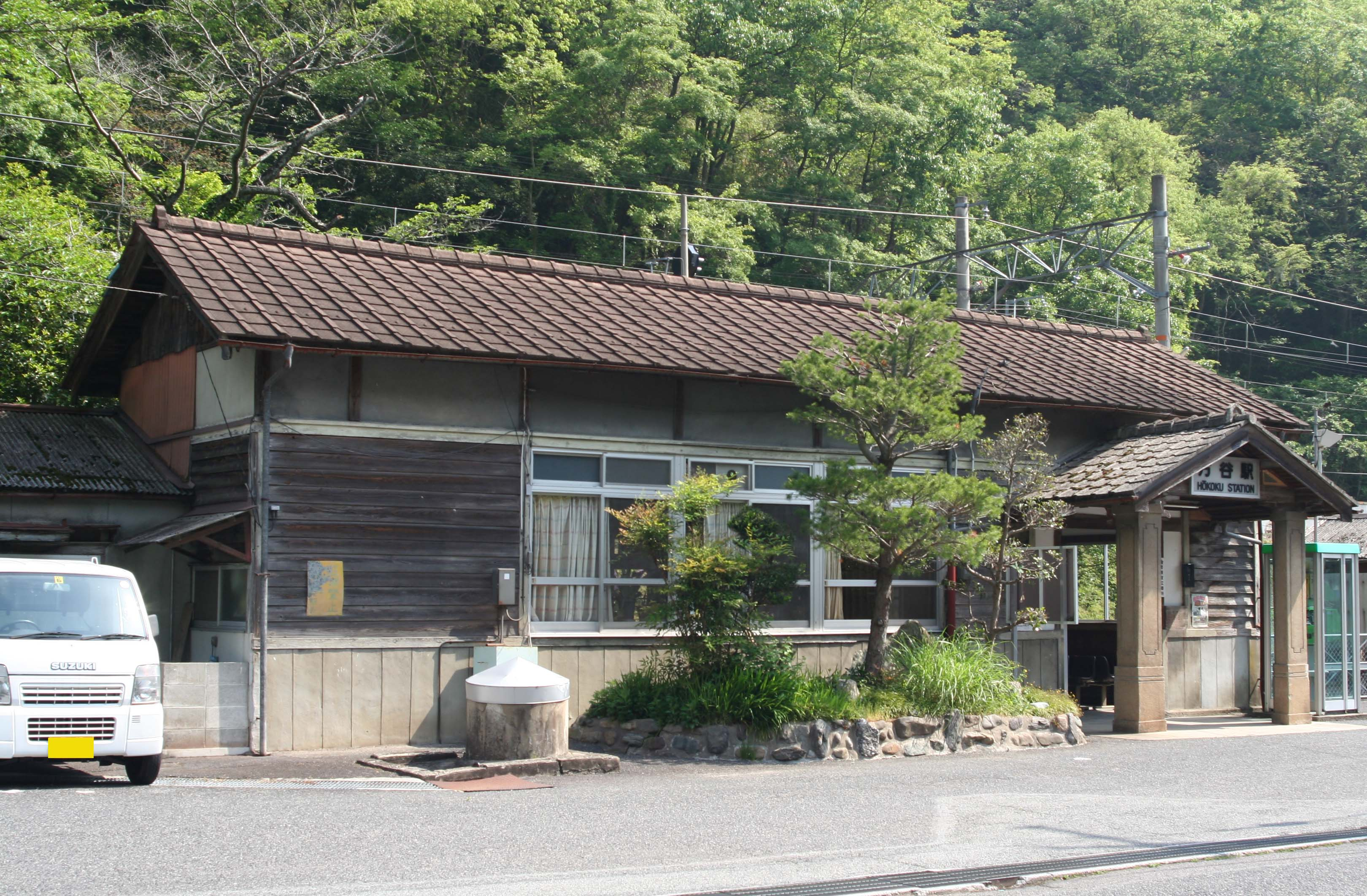
- Hōkoku Station, May 2007

General information
- Location: 9194 Nishgata, Nakai-cho, Takahashi-shi, Okayama-ken 719-2402; Japan
- Coordinates: 34°52′36.33″N 133°33′23.50″E
- Operator: JR West
- Line: V Hakubi Line
- Distance: 47.4 km (29.5 miles) from Kurashiki
- Platforms: 1 island platform
- Tracks: 2

Other information
- Status: Unstaffed
- Station code: JR-V15
- Website: Official website

History
- Opened: 25 October 1928

Passengers
- 2019: 15 daily
Location
- Location within Okayama Prefecture Location within Japan

Hōkoku Station (方谷駅, Hōkoku-eki) is a passenger railway station located in the city of Takahashi, Okayama Prefecture, Japan. It is operated by the West Japan Railway Company (JR West).

== Lines ==
Hōkoku Station is served by the Hakubi Line, and is located 47.4 kilometers from the terminus of the line at Kurashiki and 63.3 kilometers from Okayama.

== Station layout ==
The station consists of one island platform connected to the station building by an underground passage. As the platform is on a slope, it is at a slightly higher level than the station building. The station is unattended.

=== Platforms ===
1	■ V Hakubi Line	for Kurashiki and Okayama
2	■ V Hakubi Line	for Niimi and Yonago

== Adjacent stations ==
«	Service	»
Hakubi Line
Bitchū-Kawamo	-	Ikura

== History ==
Hōkoku Station opened on October 25, 1928. With the privatization of the Japan National Railways (JNR) on April 1, 1987, the station came under the aegis of the West Japan Railway Company.

== Passenger statistics ==
In fiscal 2019, the station was used by an average of 15 passengers daily.

== Surrounding area ==
- Takahashi River
- Japan National Route 180

== See also ==
- List of railway stations in Japan
