= Bitchū-Kawamo Station =

Railway station in Takahashi, Okayama Prefecture, Japan

Bitchū-Kawamo Station 備中川面駅
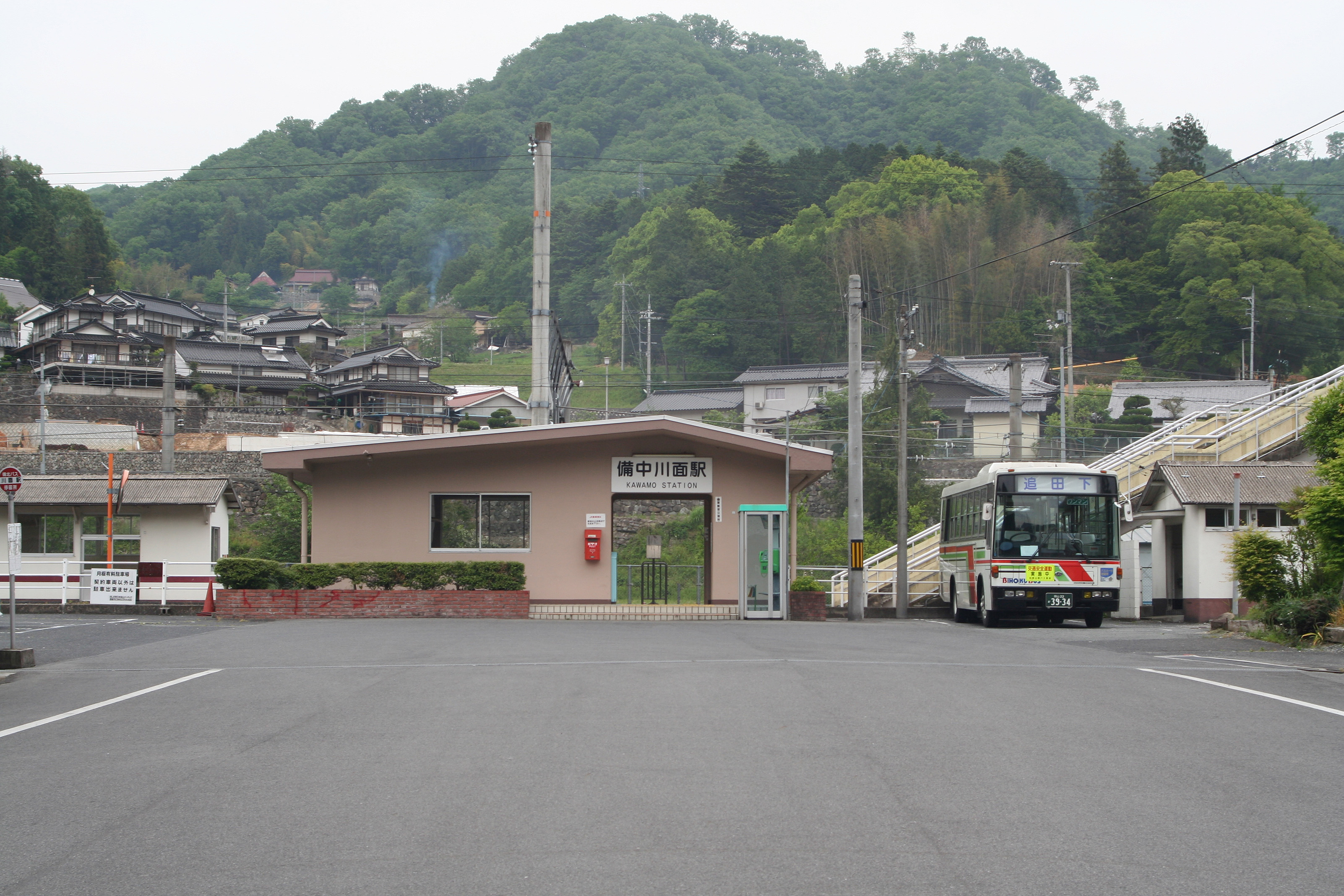
- Bitchū-Kawamo Station, May 2007

General information
- Location: Kawamo-Hirata 2734-2, Takahashi-shi, Okayama-ken 719-2121; Japan
- Coordinates: 34°51′0.19″N 133°35′18.45″E
- Operator: JR West
- Line: V Hakubi Line
- Distance: 42.7 km (26.5 miles) from Kurashiki
- Platforms: 2 side platform
- Tracks: 2

Other information
- Status: Unstaffed
- Station code: JR-V14
- Website: Official website

History
- Opened: 31 July 1927

Passengers
- 2019: 51 daily

Services
| Preceding station | JR West | Following station |
|---|---|---|
| Hōkoku towards Yonago | Hakubi Line | Kinoyama towards Okayama |
Location
- Location within Okayama Prefecture Location within Japan

Bitchū-Kawamo Station (備中川面駅, Bitchū-Kawamo-eki) is a passenger railway station located in the city of Takahashi, Okayama Prefecture, Japan. It is operated by the West Japan Railway Company (JR West).

== Lines ==
Bitchū-Kawamo Station is served by the Hakubi Line, and is located 42.7 kilometers from the terminus of the line at Kurashiki and 58.6 kilometers from Okayama.

== Station layout ==
The station consists of two ground-level opposed side platforms connected to the concrete station building by a footbridge. The station is unattended.

=== Platforms ===
| 1 | ■ V Hakubi Line | for Kurashiki and Okayama |
| 2 | ■ V Hakubi Line | for Niimi and Yonago |

== History ==
Bitchū-Kawamo Station opened on July 31, 1927. With the privatization of the Japan National Railways (JNR) on April 1, 1987, the station came under the aegis of the West Japan Railway Company.

== Passenger statistics ==
In fiscal 2019, the station was used by an average of 51 passengers daily.

== Surrounding area ==
- Takahashi Municipal Takahashi North Junior High School
- Takahashi Municipal Kawamo Elementary School
- Takahashi River
- Japan National Route 180

== See also ==
- List of railway stations in Japan
