= Bitchū-Takahashi Station =

Railway station in Takahashi, Okayama Prefecture, Japan

Bitchū-Takahashi Station 備中高梁駅
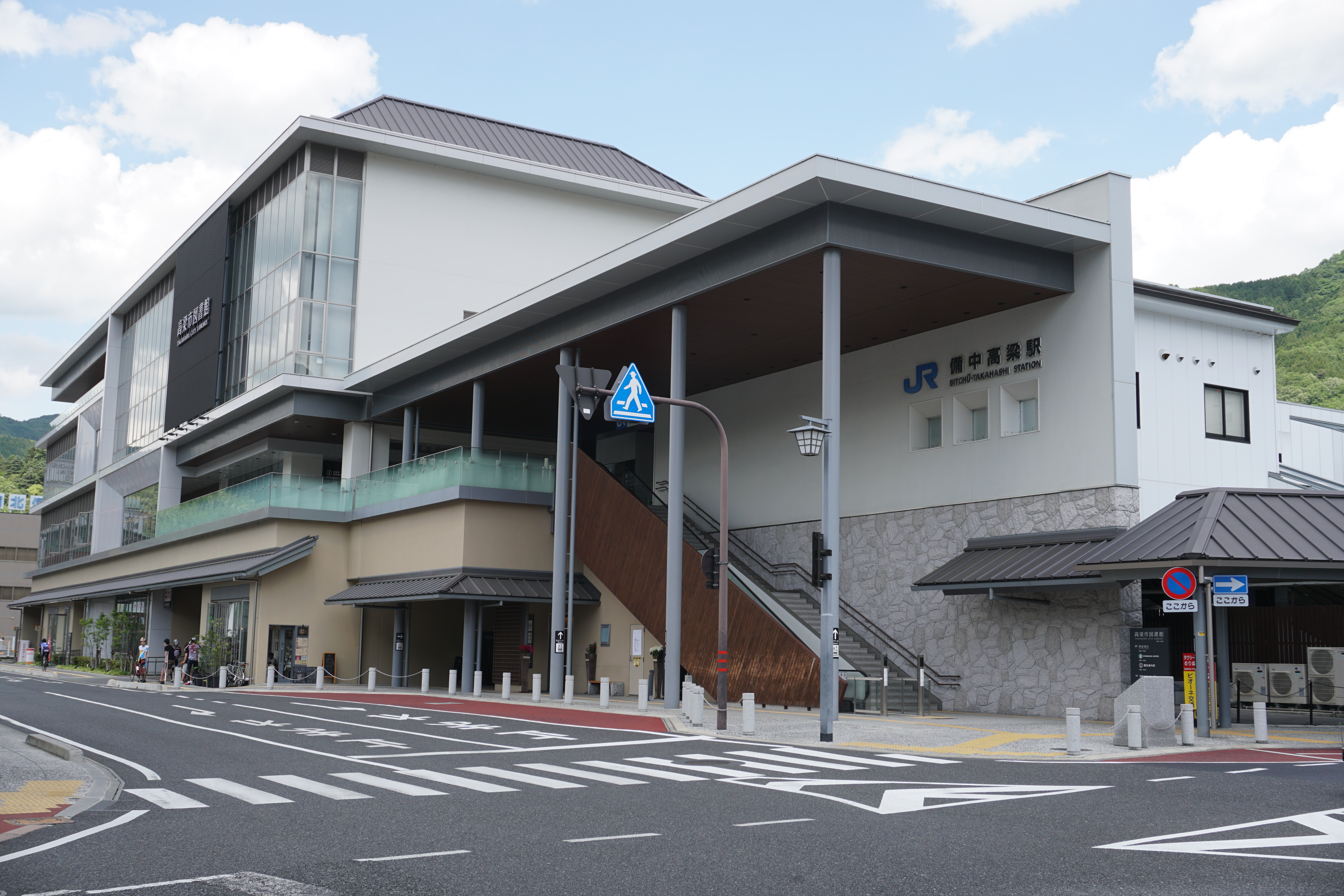
- Bitchū-Takahashi Station, May 2020

General information
- Location: 1317-2 Asahimachi, Takahashi-shi, Okayama-ken 716-0039; Japan
- Coordinates: 34°47′18.75″N 133°36′57.85″E
- Operator: JR West
- Line: V Hakubi Line
- Distance: 47.4 km (29.5 miles) from Kurashiki
- Platforms: 1 side + 1 island platform
- Tracks: 2

Other information
- Status: Staffed
- Station code: JR-V12
- Website: Official website

History
- Opened: 20 June 1926

Passengers
- 2019: 1878 daily
Location
- Location within Okayama Prefecture Location within Japan

Bitchū-Takahashi Station (備中高梁駅, Bitchū-Takahashi-eki) is a passenger railway station located in the city of Takahashi, Okayama Prefecture, Japan. It is operated by the West Japan Railway Company (JR West).

== Lines ==
Bitchū-Takahashi Station is served by the Hakubi Line, and is located 34.0 kilometers from the terminus of the line at Kurashiki and 49.9 kilometers from Okayama. The Hakubi Line extends as a single track from this station north.

== Station layout ==
The station consists of one island platform and one side platform connected by an elevated station building. The station is staffed.

=== Platforms ===
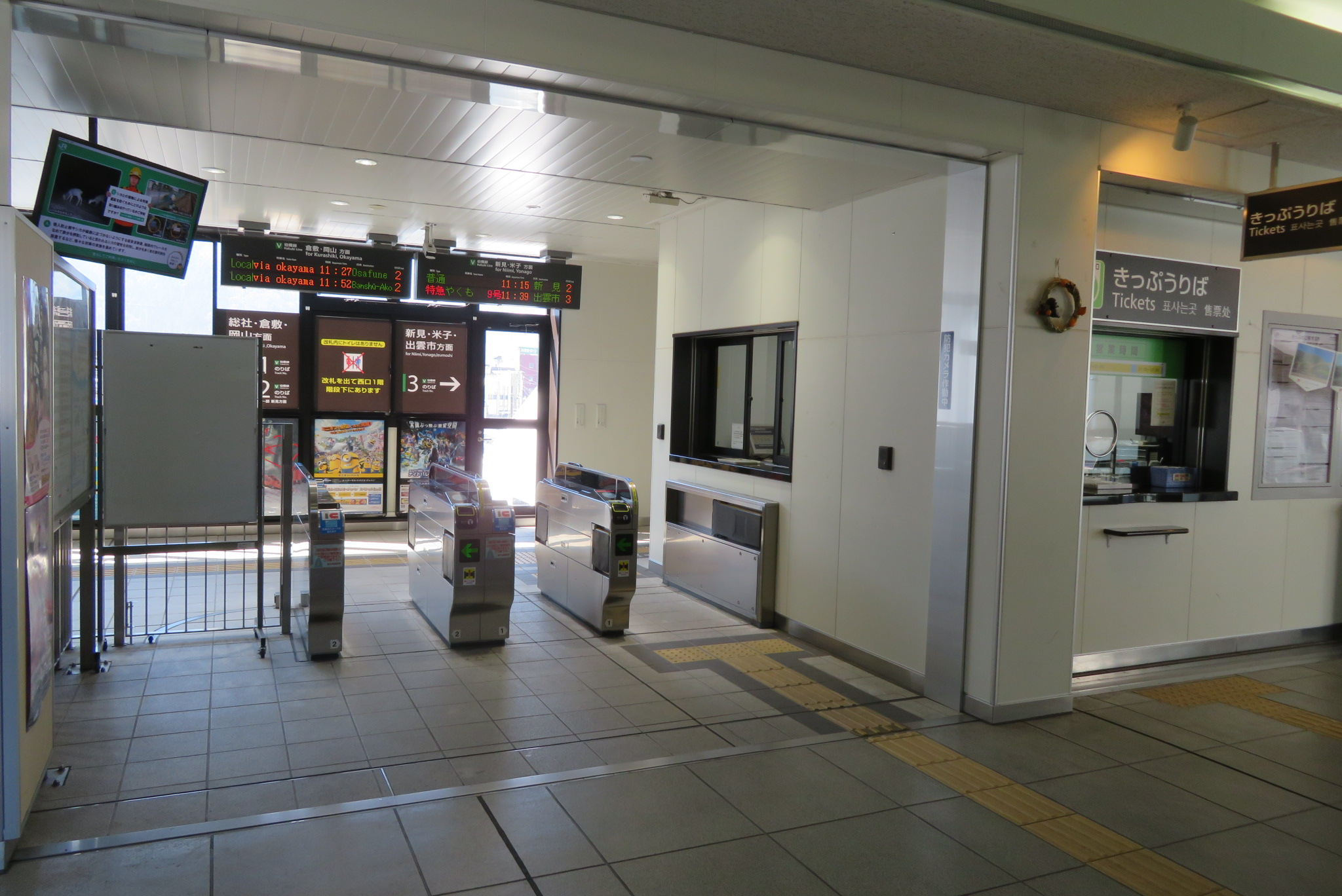
Ticket gate (2019-02-24)

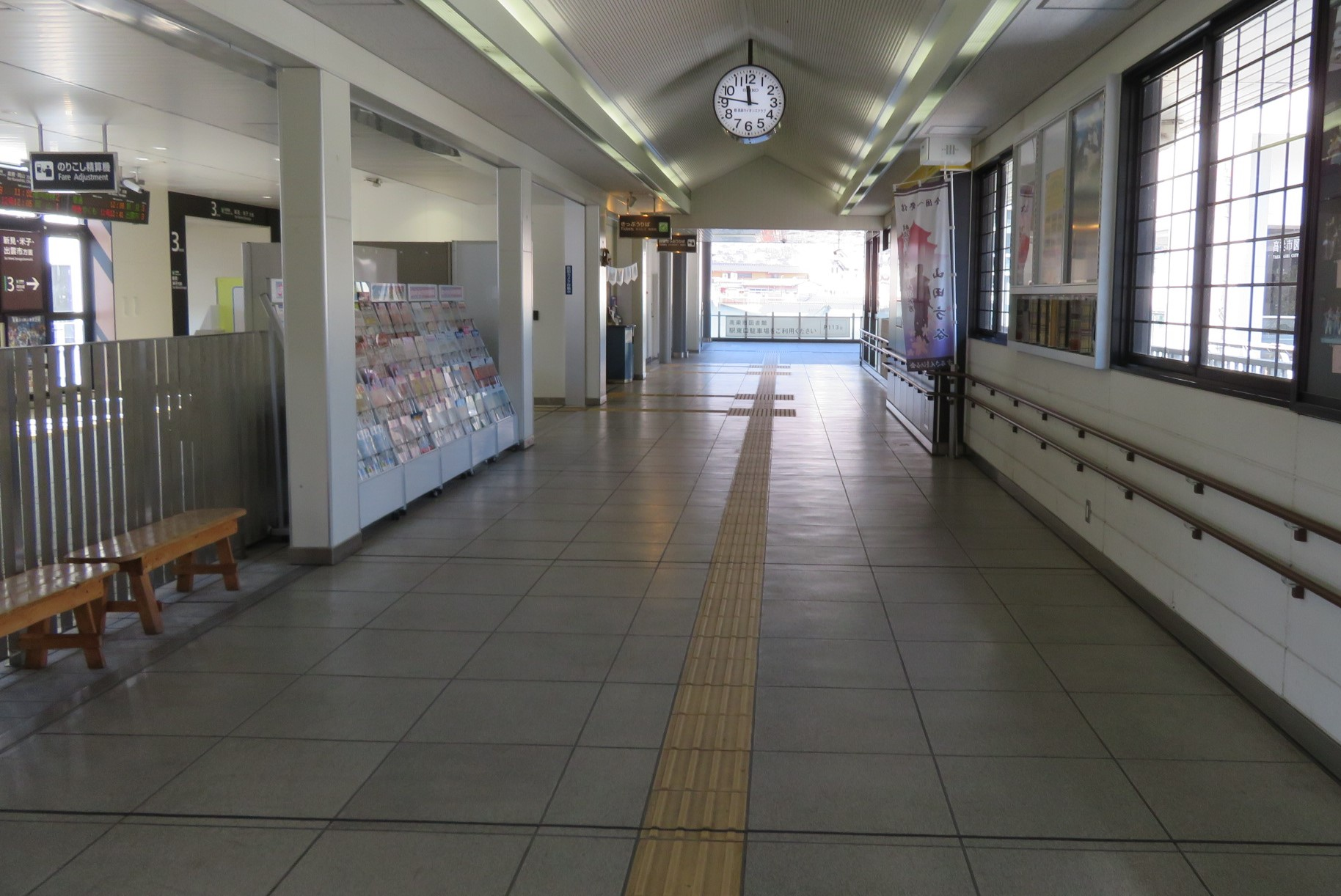
Passage (2019-02-24)

1, 2	■ V Hakubi Line	for Kurashiki and Okayama
3	■ V Hakubi Line	for Niimi and Yonago

== Adjacent stations ==
«	Service	»
Hakubi Line
Kurashiki	Sunrise Izumo	Niimi
Kobe	West Express Ginga	Neu (One-way Operation)
Soja or Kurashiki	Yakumo	Niimi
Bitchū-Hirose	Local	Kinoyama

== History ==
Bitchū-Takahashi Station opened on June 20, 1926. With the privatization of the Japan National Railways (JNR) on April 1, 1987, the station came under the aegis of the West Japan Railway Company. A new station building was completed in April 2015.

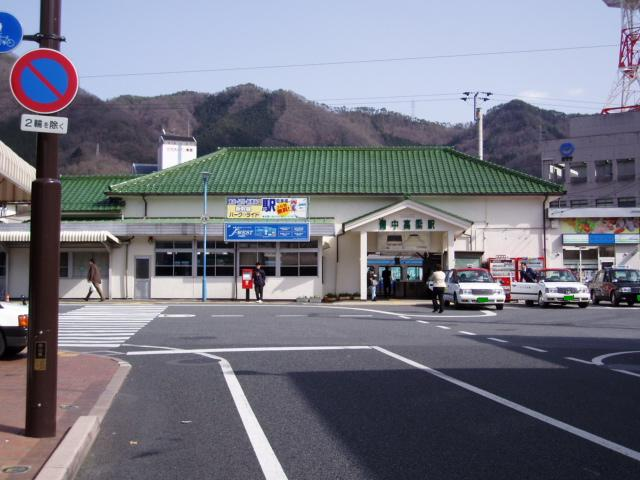
Former station building (2006-03-31)

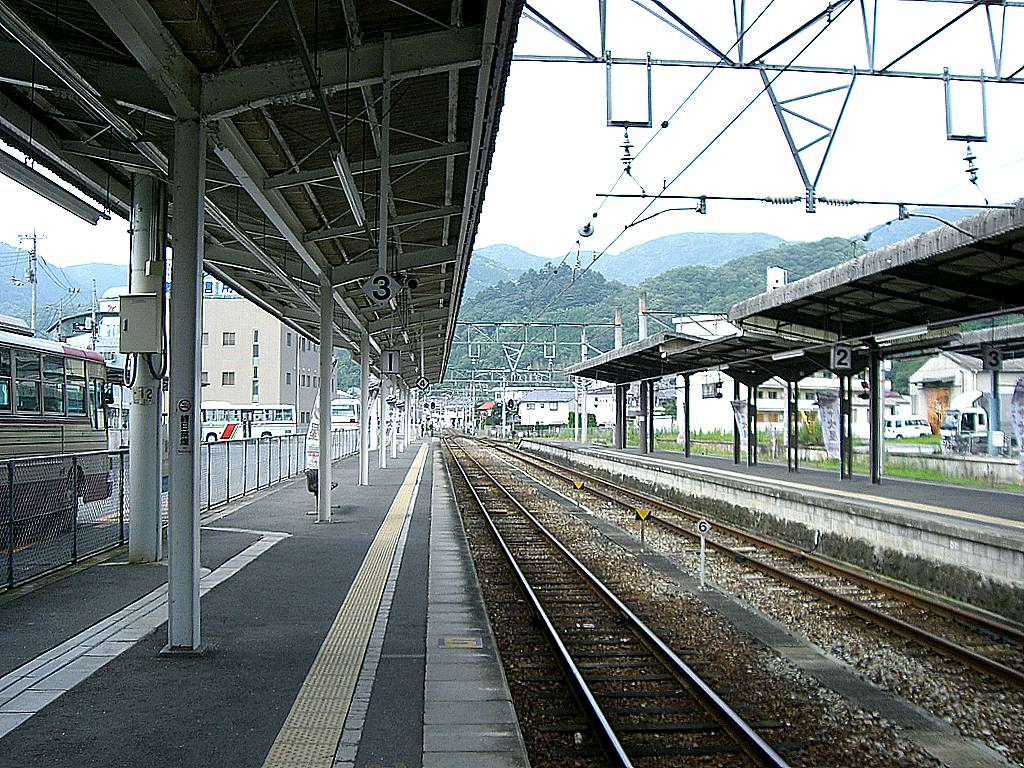
Former platform area, looking toward Niimi Station (2007-07-22)

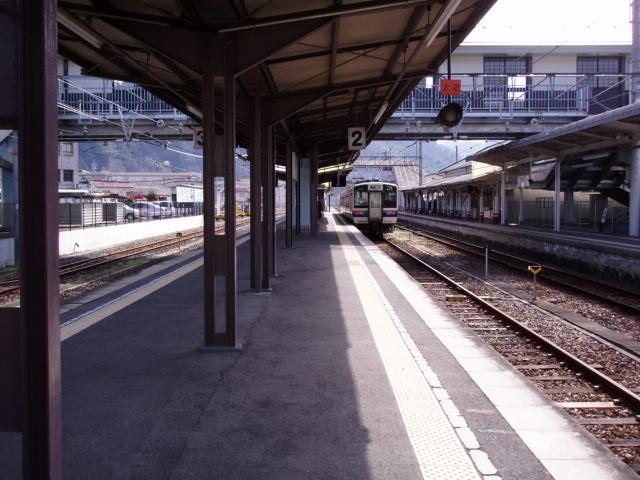
Former Station, looking toward Kurashiki Station (2006-03-31)

== Passenger statistics ==
In fiscal 2019, the station was used by an average of 1878 passengers daily.

== Surrounding area ==
Bitchū-Takahashi Station is located about 500 meters east of the Takahashi River, which is across Japan National Route 180. Next to the station is the Takahashi City Complex with the Takahashi City Library, Tourist Information Center and the Takahashi Bus Center. Also in the area are the following:

- Takahashi Municipal Office
- Bitchū Prefectural Community Center, Takahashi Branch
- Takahashi Sōgō Cultural Arts Center
- Takahashi City Bunka Kōryukan
- Kibi International University
- Okayama Prefectural Takahashi High School
- Okayama Prefectural Takahashi Jōnan High School
- Takahashi Nisshin High School
- Raikyū-ji
- Bitchu-Matsuyama Castle

== See also ==
- List of railway stations in Japan
