= Kinoyama Station =

Railway station in Takahashi, Okayama Prefecture, Japan

Kinoyama Station 木野山駅
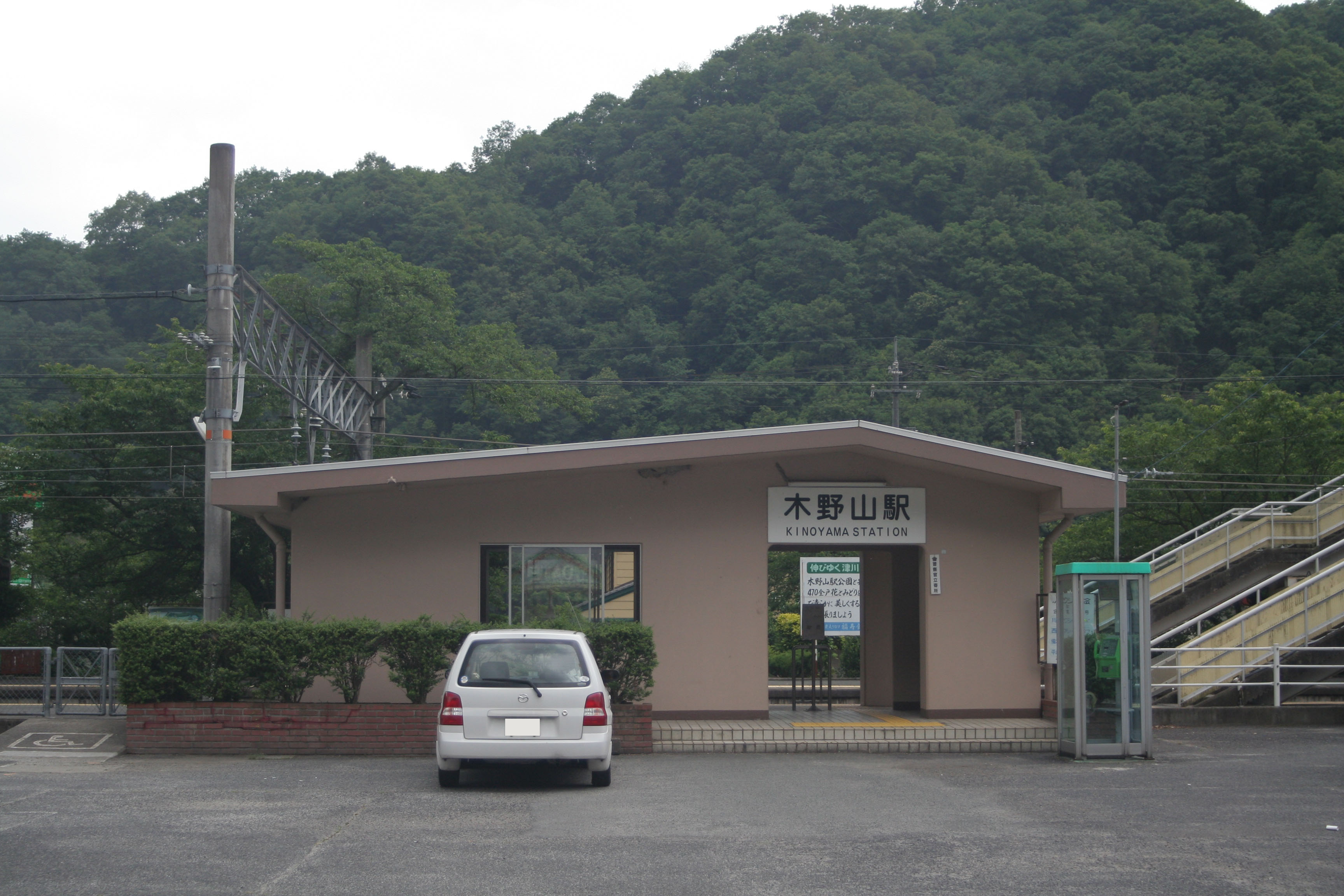
- Kinoyama Station, June 2007

General information
- Location: Tsugawacho Imazu 881-2, Takahashi-shi, Okayama-ken 716-0002; Japan
- Coordinates: 34°49′32.20″N 133°36′53.22″E
- Operator: JR West
- Line: V Hakubi Line
- Distance: 38.8 km (24.1 miles) from Kurashiki
- Platforms: 2 side platforms
- Tracks: 2

Other information
- Status: Unstaffed
- Station code: JR-V13
- Website: Official website

History
- Opened: 20 June 1926

Passengers
- 2019: 29 daily
Location
- Location within Okayama Prefecture Location within Japan

Kinoyama Station (木野山駅, Kinoyama-eki) is a passenger railway station located in the city of Takahashi, Okayama Prefecture, Japan. It is operated by the West Japan Railway Company (JR West).

== Lines ==
Kinoyama Station is served by the Hakubi Line, and is located 38.8 kilometers from the terminus of the line at Kurashiki and 54.7 kilometers from Okayama.

== Station layout ==
The station consists of two ground-level opposed side platforms connected to the station building by a footbridge. The station is unattended.

=== Platforms ===
1	■ V Hakubi Line	for Kurashiki and Okayama
2	■ V Hakubi Line	for Niimi and Yonago

== Adjacent stations ==
«	Service	»
Hakubi Line
Bitchū-Takahashi	-	Bitchū-Kawamo

== History ==
Kinoyama Station opened on June 20, 1926. With the privatization of the Japan National Railways (JNR) on April 1, 1987, the station came under the aegis of the West Japan Railway Company.

== Passenger statistics ==
In fiscal 2019, the station was used by an average of 29 passengers daily.

== Surrounding area ==
- Kinoyama Shrine
- Takahashi Municipal Tsugawa Elementary School
- Takahashi River
- Japan National Route 180

== See also ==
- List of railway stations in Japan
