= Minagi Station =

Railway station in Sōja, Okayama Prefecture, Japan

Minagi Station 美袋駅
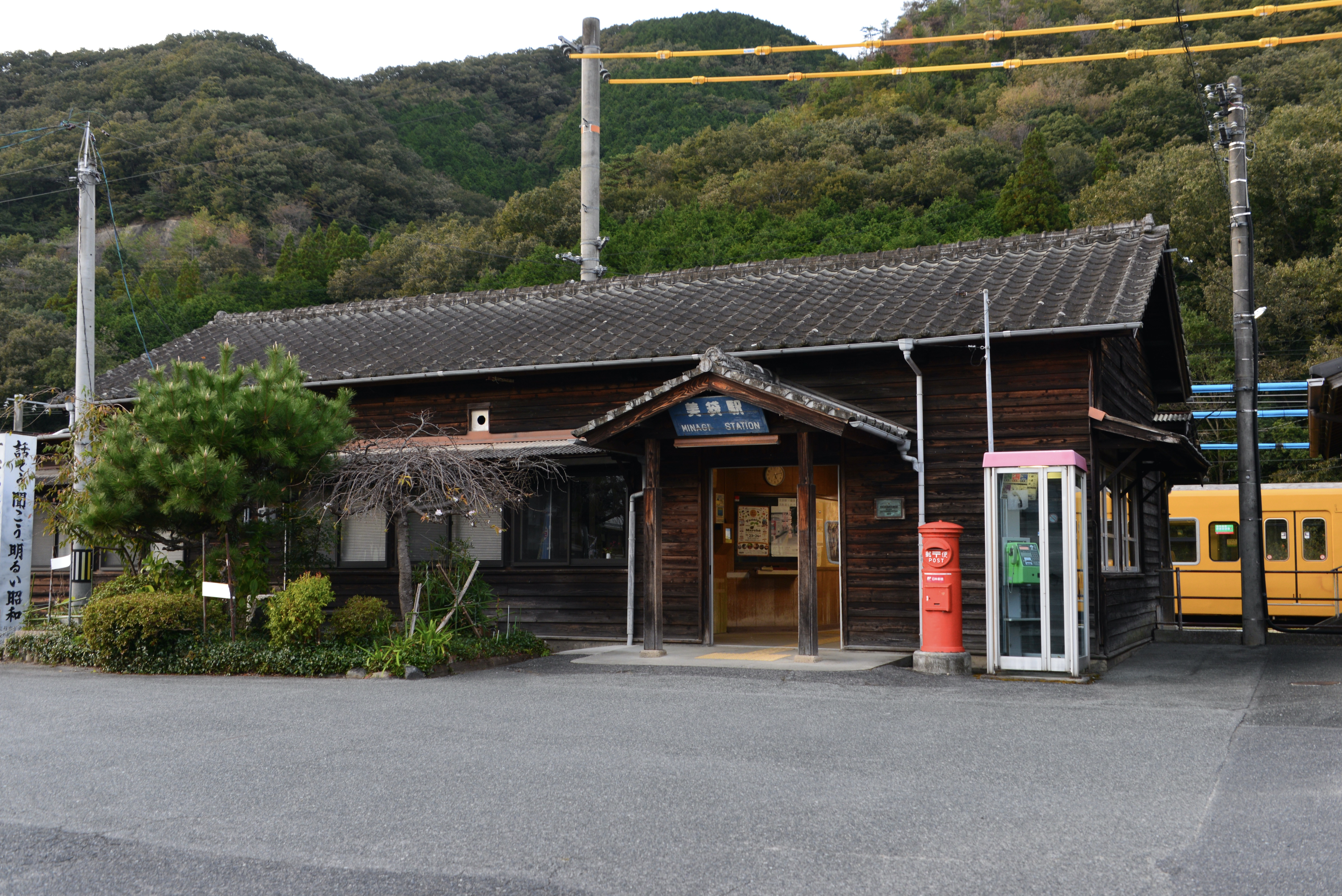
- Minagi Station, October 2021

General information
- Location: 1924-2 Minagi, Sōja-shi, Okayama-ken 719-1311; Japan
- Coordinates: 34°43′11.65″N 133°39′15.83″E
- Operator: JR West
- Line: V Hakubi Line
- Distance: 22.7 km (14.1 miles) from Kurashiki
- Platforms: 1 side + 1 island platforms
- Tracks: 3

Other information
- Status: Unstaffed
- Station code: JR-V10
- Website: Official website

History
- Opened: 17 May 1925

Passengers
- 2019: 255 daily
Location
- Location within Okayama Prefecture Location within Japan

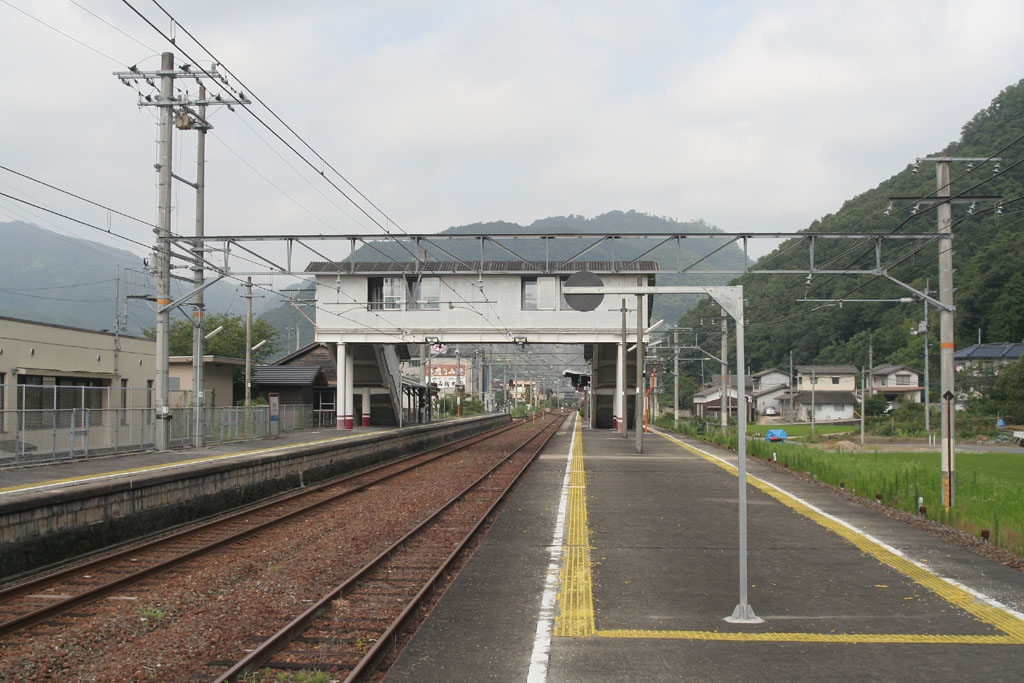
Minagi Station platform area (2007-08-01)

Minagi Station (美袋駅, Minagi-eki) is a passenger railway station located in the city of Sōja, Okayama Prefecture, Japan. It is operated by the West Japan Railway Company (JR West).

== Lines ==
Minagi Station is served by the Hakubi Line, and is located 22.7 kilometers from the terminus of the line at Kurashiki and 38.6 kilometers from Okayama.

== Station layout ==
The station consists of a ground-level side platform and an island platforms connected to the wooden station building by a footbridge. The station is unattended. The station building, which dates from the opening of the line in 1925, received protection by the national government as a Registered Tangible Cultural Property in 2007. It is a one-story wooden structure (79 square meters) with a gable roof with cement tiles and wooden boards on the outer wall. Except for changing the windows and fittings of the entrance to aluminum sashes, the building has remained almost as it was when it was originally built. It has been managed by Sōja City since 1985.

=== Platforms ===
1, 2	■ V Hakubi Line	for Kurashiki and Okayama
3	■ V Hakubi Line	for Niimi and Yonago

== Adjacent stations ==
«	Service	»
Hakubi Line
Hiwa	-	Bitchū-Hirose

== History ==
Minagi Station opened on May 17, 1925. With the privatization of the Japan National Railways (JNR) on April 1, 1987, the station came under the aegis of the West Japan Railway Company.

== Passenger statistics ==
In fiscal 2019, the station was used by an average of 255 passengers daily.

== Surrounding area ==
- Sōja City Hall Shōwa Branch Office (former Shōwa Town Hall)
- Sōja Municipal Shōwa Junior High School
- Sōja Municipal Shōwa Elementary School
- Takahashi River
- Japan National Route 180

== See also ==
- List of railway stations in Japan
