= Kamisuge Station =

Railway station in Hino, Tottori Prefecture, Japan

Kamisuge Station 上菅駅
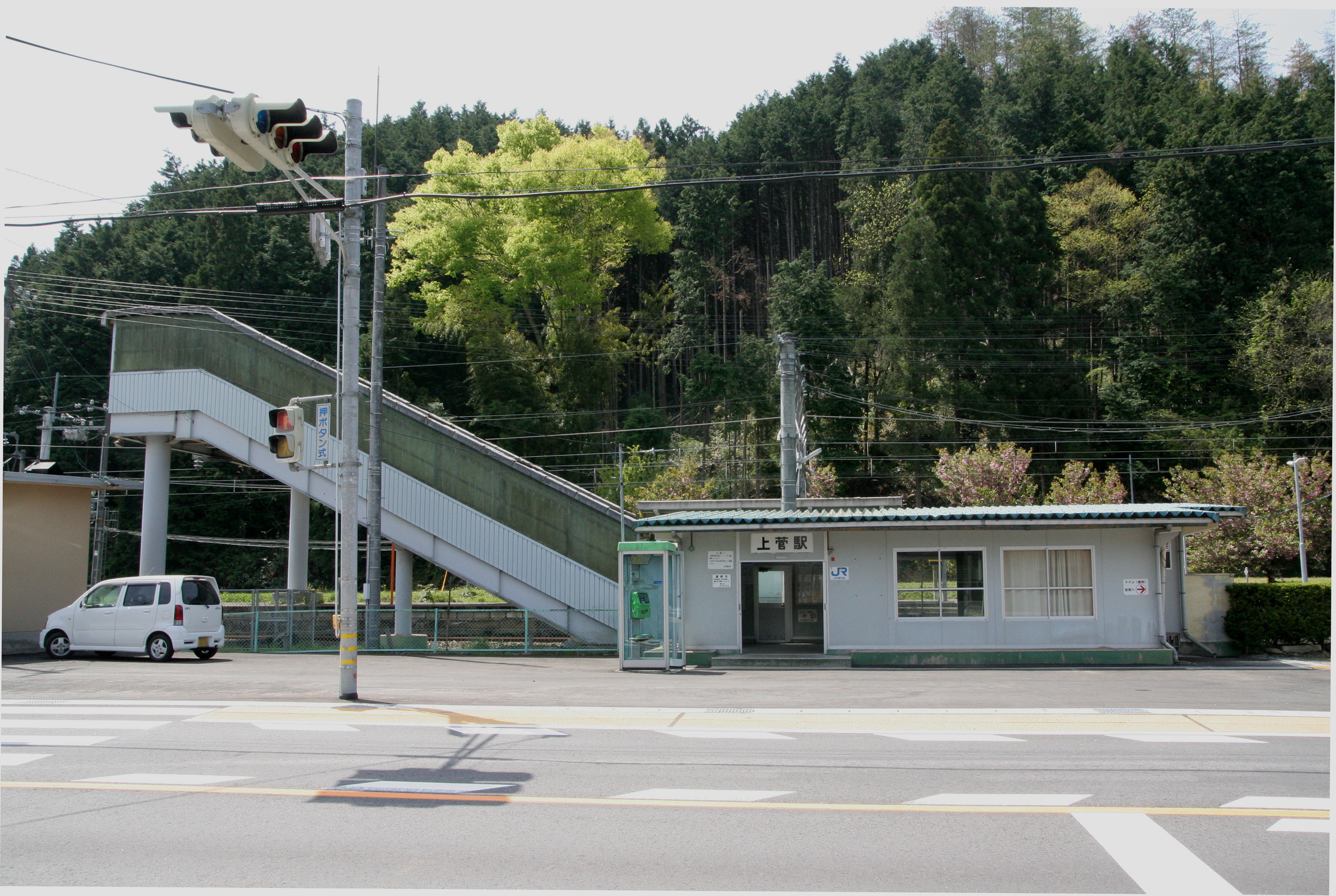
- Kamisuge Station, May 2008

General information
- Location: Kamisuge, Hino-cho, Hino-gun, Tottori-ken 689-5137; Japan
- Coordinates: 35°11′36.66″N 133°20′30.41″E
- Operator: JR West
- Line: Hakubi Line
- Distance: 98.9 km (61.5 miles) from Kurashiki
- Platforms: 1 island platform
- Tracks: 2

Construction
- Structure type: At grade

Other information
- Status: Unstaffed
- Website: Official website

History
- Opened: 1 April 1925

Passengers
- 2018: 12 daily
Location
- Location within Tottori Prefecture Location within Japan

Kamisuge Station (上菅駅, Kamisuge-eki) is a passenger railway station located in the town of Hino, Tottori Prefecture, Japan. It is operated by the West Japan Railway Company (JR West).

== Lines ==
Kamisuge Station is served by the Hakubi Line, and is located 98.9 kilometers from the terminus of the line at Kurashiki and 114.86 kilometers from Okayama.

== Station layout ==
The station consists of one ground-level island platform connected with the station building by a footbridge. The station is unattended.

=== Platforms ===
1	■ Hakubi Line	for Yonago
2	■ Hakubi Line	for Niimi and Okayama

== Adjacent stations ==
«	Service	»
Hakubi Line
Shōyama	-	Kurosaka

== History ==
Kamisuge Station opened on April 1, 1925. With the privatization of the Japan National Railways (JNR) on April 1, 1987, the station came under the aegis of the West Japan Railway Company.

== Passenger statistics ==
In fiscal 2018, the station was used by an average of 12 passengers daily.

== Surrounding area ==
- Japan National Route 180
- Japan National Route 183

== See also ==
- List of railway stations in Japan
