= Neu Station =

Railway station in Hino, Tottori Prefecture, Japan

Neu Station 根雨駅
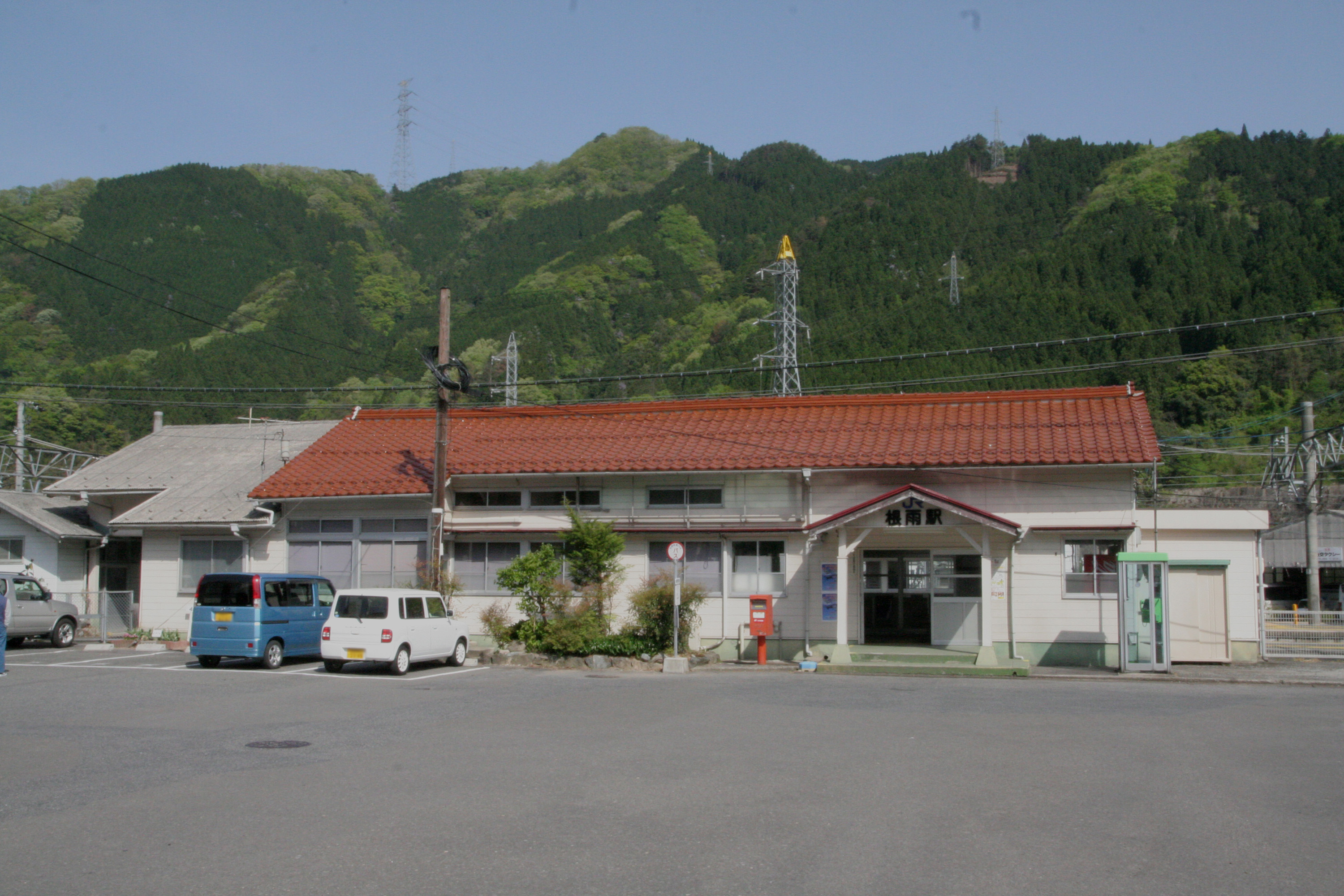
- Neu Station, May 2008

General information
- Location: Neu, Hino-cho, Hino-gun, Tottori-ken 689-4503; Japan
- Coordinates: 35°14′29.30″N 133°26′30.36″E
- Operator: JR West
- Line: Hakubi Line
- Distance: 111.3 km (69.2 miles) from Kurashiki
- Platforms: 1 Side + 1 island platform
- Tracks: 3

Construction
- Structure type: At grade

Other information
- Status: Staffed (Midori no Madoguchi )
- Website: Official website

History
- Opened: 30 July 1922

Passengers
- 2018: 436 daily
Location
- Location within Tottori Prefecture Location within Japan

Neu Station (根雨駅, Neu-eki) is a passenger railway station located in the town of Hino, Tottori Prefecture, Japan. It is operated by the West Japan Railway Company (JR West).

== Lines ==
Neu Station is served by the Hakubi Line, and is located 111.3 kilometers from the terminus of the line at Kurashiki and 127.2 kilometers from Okayama.

== Station layout ==
The station consists of one ground-level island platform connected with the station building by a footbridge. The old wooden station building is located on the side of Platform 1, and has a Midori no Madoguchi staffed ticket office.

=== Platforms ===
1	■ Hakubi Line	for Niimi and Okayama
2, 3	■ Hakubi Line	for Yonago and Matsue

== Adjacent stations ==
«	Service	»
Hakubi Line
Bitchu-Takahashi	West Express Ginga	Yonago (One-way Operation)
Kurosaka	Local	Muko

== History ==
Neu Station opened on July 30, 1922. With the privatization of the Japan National Railways (JNR) on April 1, 1987, the station came under the aegis of the West Japan Railway Company.

== Passenger statistics ==
In fiscal 2018, the station was used by an average of 436 passengers daily.

== Surrounding area ==
- Hino Town Hall
- Tottori Prefectural Hino High School
- Hino Municipal Hino Junior High School
- Hino Town Neu Elementary School

== See also ==
- List of railway stations in Japan
