= Ebi Station =

Railway station in Kōfu, Tottori Prefecture, Japan

Ebi Station 江尾駅
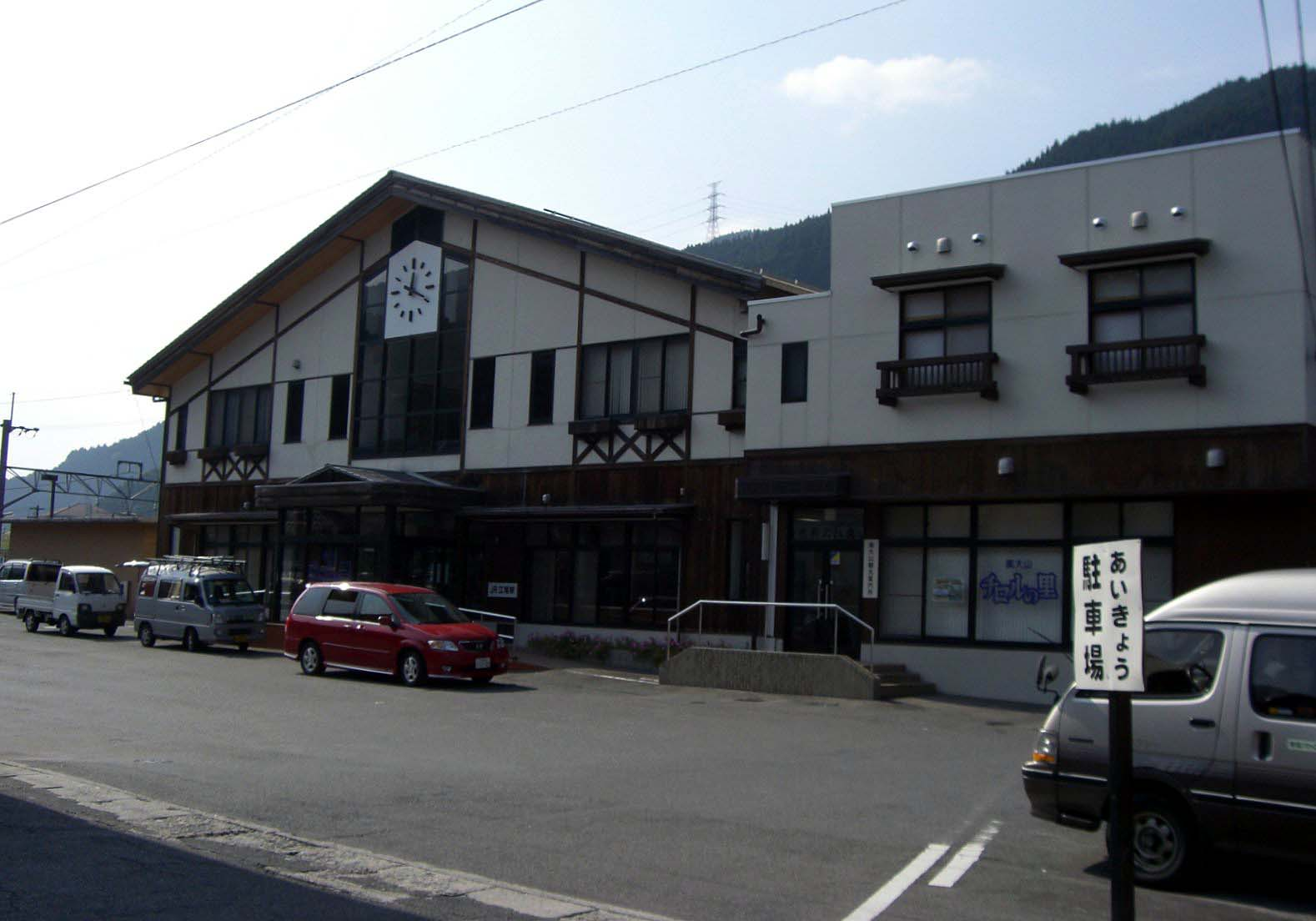
- Ebi Station, November 2006

General information
- Location: 2076 Nakayashiki, Ebi, Kōfu-cho, Hino-gun, Tottori-ken 689-4401; Japan
- Coordinates: 35°16′58.96″N 133°29′5.41″E
- Operator: JR West
- Line: Hakubi Line
- Distance: 118.1 km (73.4 miles) from Kurashiki
- Platforms: 1 side + 1 island platform
- Tracks: 3

Construction
- Structure type: At grade

Other information
- Status: Staffed (Midori no Madoguchi )
- Website: Official website

History
- Opened: 25 May 1922

Passengers
- 2018: 104 daily
Location
- Location within Tottori Prefecture Location within Japan

Ebi Station (江尾駅, Ebi-eki) is a passenger railway station located in the town of Kōfu, Tottori Prefecture, Japan. It is operated by the West Japan Railway Company (JR West).

== Lines ==
Ebi Station is served by the Hakubi Line, and is located 118.1 kilometers from the terminus of the line at Kurashiki and 134.0 kilometers from Okayama.

== Station layout ==
The station consists of one ground-level side platform and one ground-level island platform. The station building is adjacent to the side platform and connected with the island platform by a footbridge. The station building is a multi-purpose facilities and also contains the Kōfu Town Chamber of Commerce and Industry.

=== Platforms ===
1	■ Hakubi Line	for Niimi and Okayama
2	■ Hakubi Line	for Yonago and Matsue
3	■ Hakubi Line	for express train standby in both directions

== Adjacent stations ==
«	Service	»
Hakubi Line
Muko	-	Hōki-Mizoguchi

== History ==
Ebi Station opened on March 25, 1922. With the privatization of the Japan National Railways (JNR) on April 1, 1987, the station came under the aegis of the West Japan Railway Company.

== Passenger statistics ==
In fiscal 2018, the station was used by an average of 104 passengers daily.

== Surrounding area ==
- Kōfu Town Hall

== See also ==
- List of railway stations in Japan
