= Hōki-Mizoguchi Station =

Railway station in Hōki, Tottori Prefecture, Japan

Hōki-Mizoguchi Station 伯耆溝口
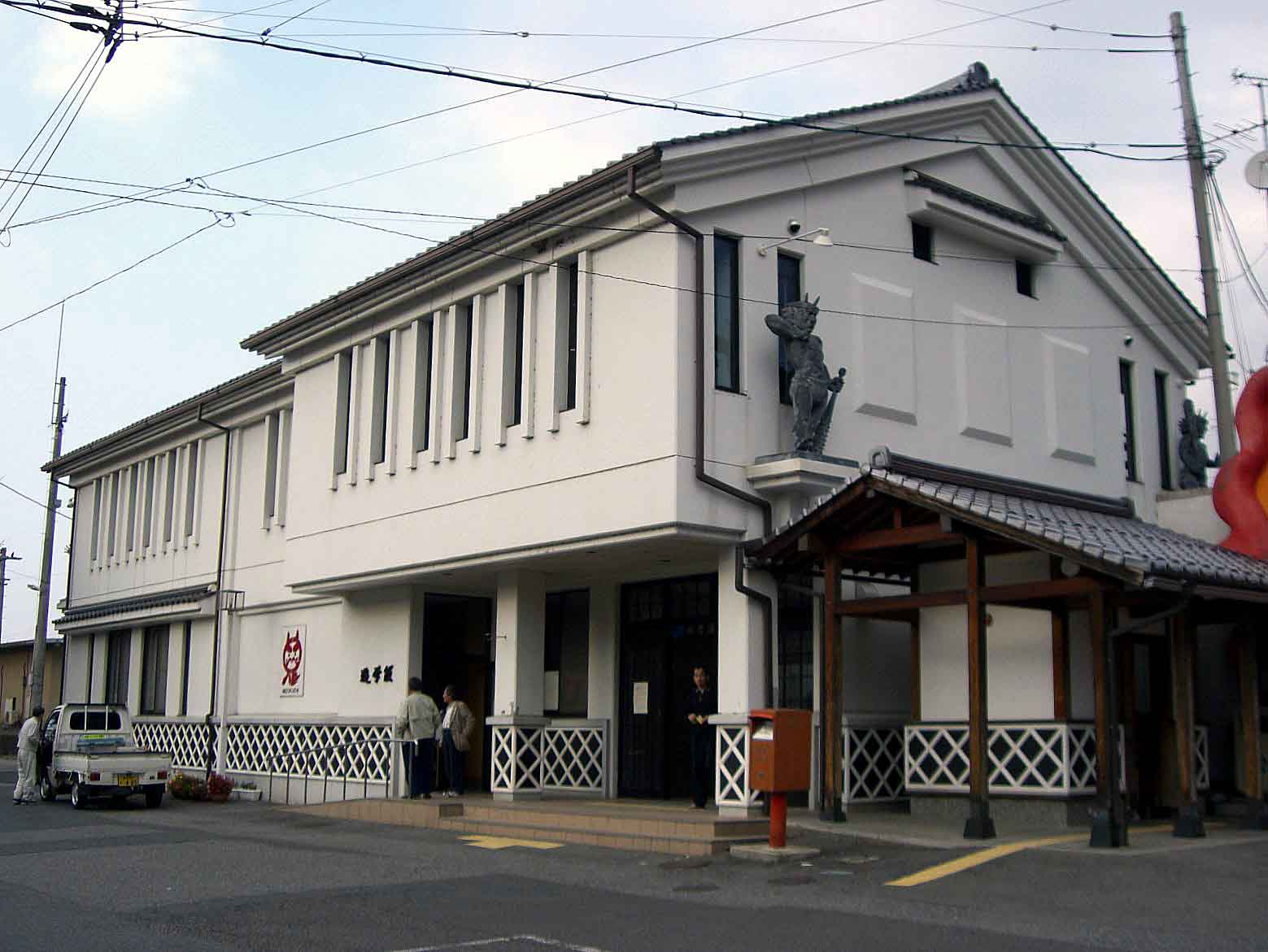
- Hōki-Mizoguchi Station, November 2006

General information
- Location: Mizokuchi, Hōki-chō, Saihaku-gun, Tottori-ken 689-4201; Japan
- Coordinates: 35°20′53.55″N 133°26′7.29″E
- Operator: JR West
- Line: Hakubi Line
- Distance: 127.3 km (79.1 miles) from Kurashiki
- Platforms: 1 island platform
- Tracks: 2

Construction
- Structure type: At grade

Other information
- Status: Unstaffed
- Website: Official website

History
- Opened: 10 August 1919

Passengers
- 2018: 156 daily
Location
- Location within Tottori Prefecture Location within Japan

Hōki-Mizoguchi Station (伯耆溝口駅, Hōki-Mizoguchi-eki) is a passenger railway station located in the town of Hōki, Tottori Prefecture, Japan. It is operated by the West Japan Railway Company (JR West).

== Lines ==
Hōki-Mizoguchi Station is served by the Hakubi Line, and is located 127.3 kilometers from the terminus of the line at Kurashiki and 143.2 kilometers from Okayama.

== Station layout ==
The station consists of one ground-level island platform connected with the station building by a level crossing. The station is unattended.

=== Platforms ===
1	■ Hakubi Line	for Yonago
2	■ Hakubi Line	for Niimi and Okayama

== Adjacent stations ==
«	Service	»
Hakubi Line
Ebi	-	Kishimoto

== History ==
Hōki-Mizoguchi Station opened on August 10, 1919. With the privatization of the Japan National Railways (JNR) on April 1, 1987, the station came under the aegis of the West Japan Railway Company.

== Passenger statistics ==
In fiscal 2018, the station was used by an average of 156 passengers daily.

== Surrounding area ==
- Hōki Town Office Mizonokuchi Branch Office
- Hōki Municipal Mizoguchi Junior High School

== See also ==
- List of railway stations in Japan
