= Kurosaka Station =

Railway station in Hino, Tottori Prefecture, Japan

Kurosaka Station 黒坂駅
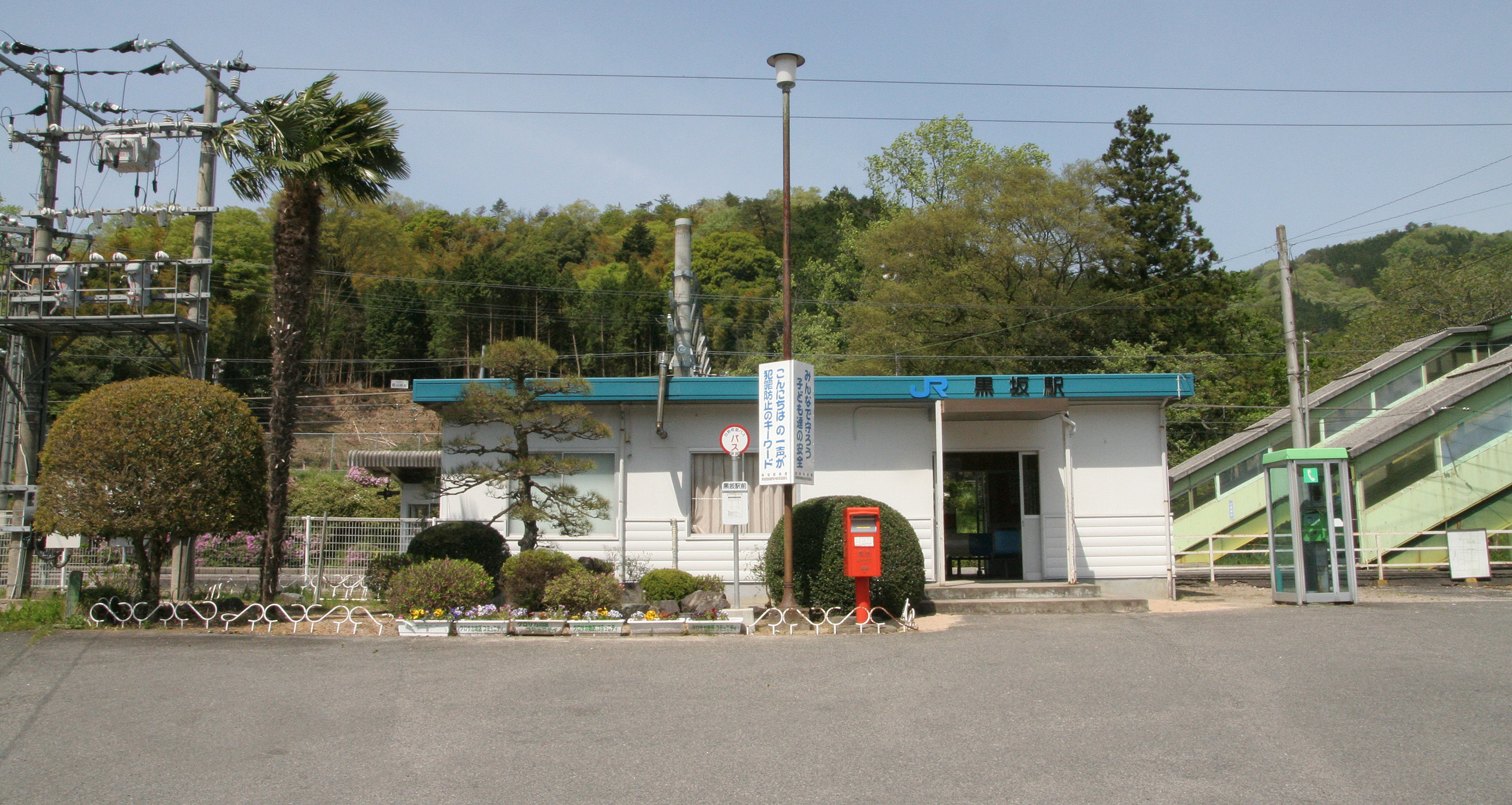
- Kurosaka Station, May 2008

General information
- Location: Kurosaka, Hino-cho, Hino-gun, Tottori-ken 689-5131; Japan
- Coordinates: 35°12′23.39″N 133°23′0.61″E
- Operator: JR West
- Line: Hakubi Line
- Distance: 103.7 km (64.4 miles) from Kurashiki
- Platforms: 2 side platforms
- Tracks: 2

Construction
- Structure type: At grade

Other information
- Status: Unstaffed
- Website: Official website

History
- Opened: 1 April 1925

Passengers
- 2018: 48 daily
Location
- Location within Tottori Prefecture Location within Japan

Kurosaka Station (黒坂駅, Kurosaka-eki) is a passenger railway station located in the town of Hino, Tottori Prefecture, Japan. It is operated by the West Japan Railway Company (JR West).

== Lines ==
Kurosaka Station is served by the Hakubi Line, and is located 103.7 kilometers from the terminus of the line at Kurashiki and 119.6 kilometers from Okayama.

== Station layout ==
The station consists of two opposed ground-level side platforms connected with the station building by a footbridge. The station is unattended.

=== Platforms ===
1	■ Hakubi Line	for Niimi and Okayama
2	■ Hakubi Line	for Yonago

== Adjacent stations ==
«	Service	»
Hakubi Line
Kamisuge	-	Neu

== History ==
Kurosaka Station opened on November 10, 1922. With the privatization of the Japan National Railways (JNR) on April 1, 1987, the station came under the aegis of the West Japan Railway Company.

== Passenger statistics ==
In fiscal 2018, the station was used by an average of 48 passengers daily.

== Surrounding area ==
- Hino Town Kurosaka Elementary School
- Tottori Prefectural Hino High School Kurosaka Facility

== See also ==
- List of railway stations in Japan
