= Hino, Tottori =

Hino 日野町
- Town
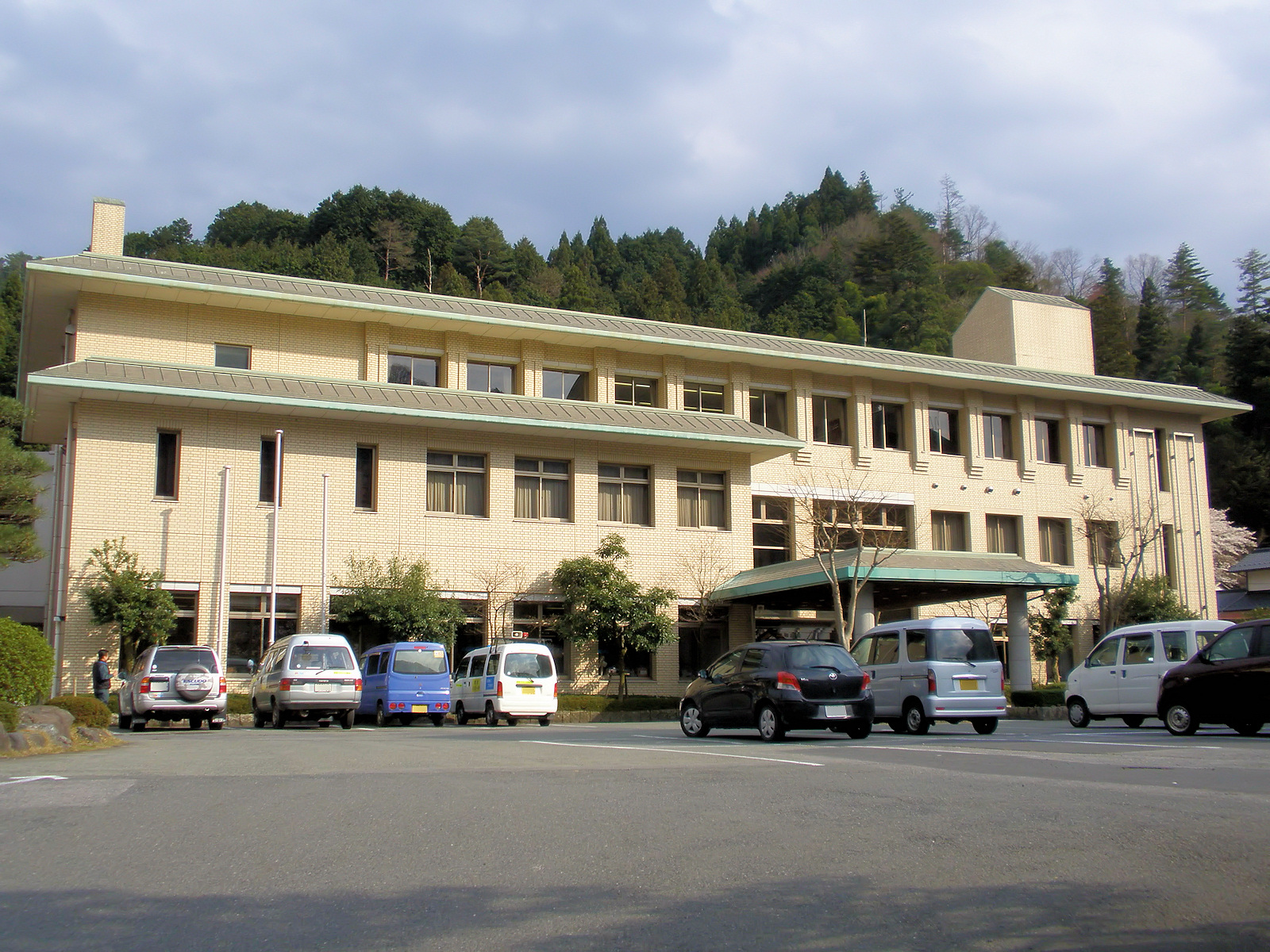
- Hino Town Office, Hino, Tottori Prefecture

- Flag Seal
- Interactive map of Hino
- Coordinates: 35°14′N 133°27′E
- Country: Japan
- Region: Chūgoku; San'in
- Prefecture: Tottori
- District: Hino

Area
  - Total: 133.98 km^{2} (51.73 sq mi)

Population (March 1, 2025)
  - Total: 2,591
  - Density: 19.34/km^{2} (50.09/sq mi)
- Time zone: UTC+9 (Japan Standard Time)
- City symbols
  - Tree: Japanese cedar
  - Flower: Azalea
  - Bird: Mandarin duck
- Phone number: 0859-72-0331
- Address: 101 Neu, Hino-chō, Hino-gun, Tottori-ken 689-4503
- Website: Official website(in Japanese)

Hino (日野町, Hino-chō) is a town located in Hino District, Tottori Prefecture, Japan. As of 1 March 2025, the town had an estimated population of 2,591 in 1,223 households and a population density of 19 persons per km^{2}. The total area of the town is 133.98 square kilometres (51.73 sq mi).

== Geography ==
Hino is located in the Chūgoku Mountains in western Tottori Prefecture. The town center is located around the JR West Hakubi Line Neu Station.

== Neighboring municipalities ==
Tottori Prefecture

- Nichinan
- Nanbu
- Hōki
- Kōfu

Okayama Prefecture

- Niimi
- Shinjō

== Climate ==
Hino is classified as a humid subtropical climate (Köppen Cfa) characterized by warm summers and cold winters with heavy snowfall. The average annual temperature in Hino is 11.9 °C. The average annual rainfall is 1883 mm with September as the wettest month. The temperatures are highest on average in August, at around 23.6 °C, and lowest in January, at around 0.1 °C.

== Demography ==
Per Japanese census data, the population of Hino has been as follows. The town has been suffering from rural depopulation, and the population has been continuously decreasing rapidly since the 1950s.

Historical population
Year	Pop.	±%
1920	8,069	—
1930	7,960	−1.4%
1940	8,004	+0.6%
1950	9,542	+19.2%
1960	8,701	−8.8%
1970	6,757	−22.3%
1980	6,092	−9.8%
1990	5,377	−11.7%
2000	4,516	−16.0%
2010	3,758	−16.8%

== History ==
The area of Hino was part of ancient Hōki Province. Yayoi period and Kofun period remains have been found in the area. In the Sengoku period (1467 – 1573) the Hino clan built Kagamiyama Castle on Mount Kagami (335 metres (1,099 ft)) in the Kurosaka area of Hino. The small-scale castle consisted of only honmaru inner bailey and a ni-no-maru outer bailey. Packhorses were also kept at the castle. A castle town was built at the base of the mountain. In 1632 the Ikeda clan destroyed the castle, and used the site as an encampment. In the Edo period (1603 – 1868) the village of Neu became a shukuba post town. The commercial and administrative activities of the present-day Hino shifted to the Neu, where they remain today.

During the Edo Period, it was part of the holdings of the Ikeda clan of Tottori Domain. The extraction of iron sand from the mountains and the production of tatara iron were important industries in this area until the rise of modern iron production in the modern era. Following the Meiji restoration the area was divided into villages within Hino District, Tottori on October 1, 1889, with the establishment of the modern municipalities system. The town of Hino was formed on May 1, 1959, by the merger of the towns of Kurosaka and Neu.

== Government ==
Hino has a mayor-council form of government with a directly elected mayor and a unicameral town council of ten members. Hino, collectively with the other municipalities of Hino District, contributes one member to the Tottori Prefectural Assembly. In terms of national politics, the town is part of Tottori 2nd district of the lower house of the Diet of Japan.

== Economy ==
The economy of Hino is based agriculture and seasonal tourism.

== Education ==
Hino has two public elementary schools and one public junior high school operated by the town government, and one public high school operated by the Tottori Prefectural Board of Education.

== Transportation ==
=== Railway ===
JR West - Hakubi Line

- Kamisuge - Kurosaka - Neu

=== Highways ===
- National Route 180
- National Route 181
- National Route 183

== Local attractions ==
- Kamochi Shrine
