= Hakubi Line =

Railway line in Japan

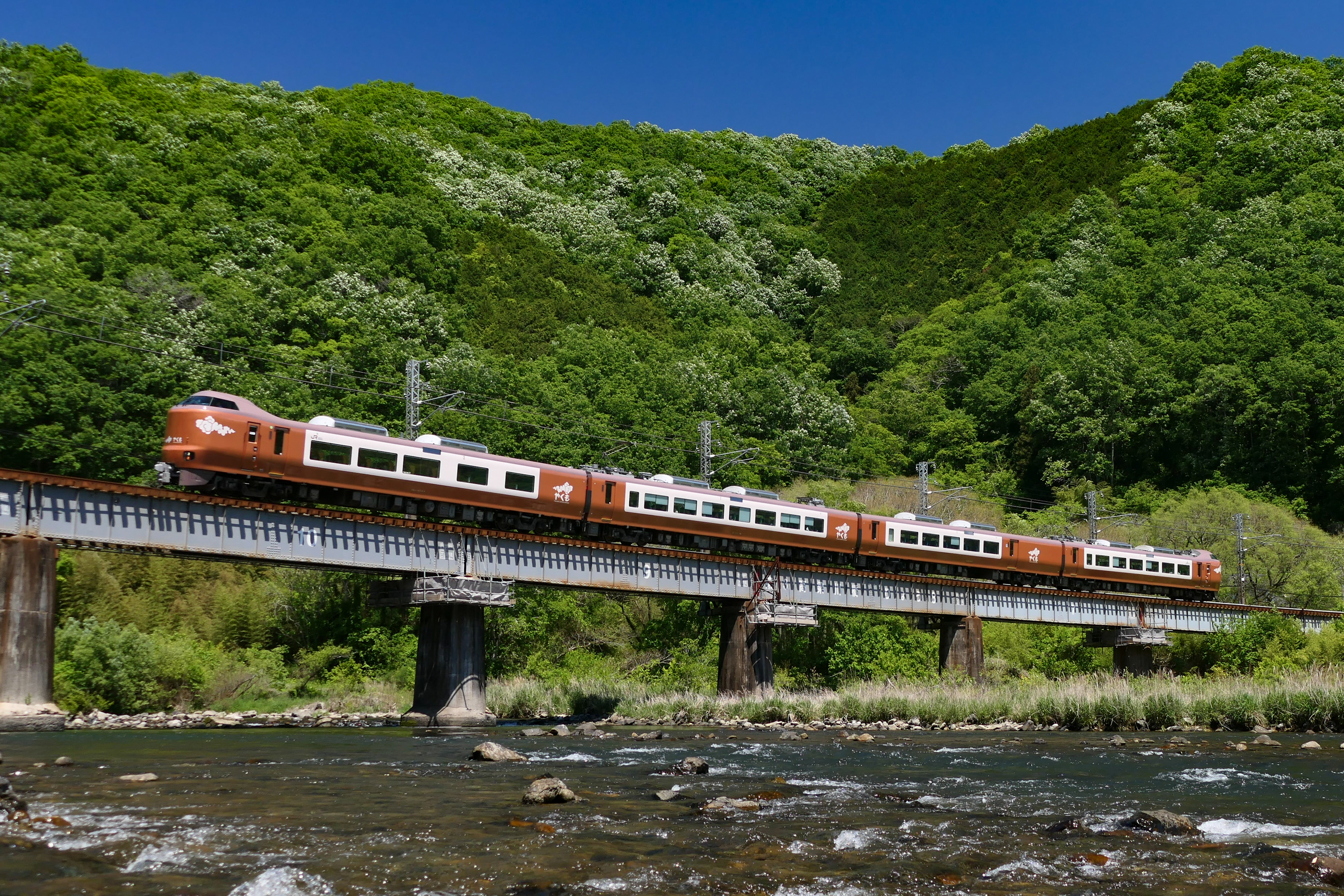
- Limited Express Yakumo

Overview
- Owner: JR West
- Locale: Okayama and Tottori Prefectures
- Termini: Kurashiki; Hōki-Daisen
- Stations: 28

Service
- Type: Regional rail
- Operator(s): JR West; Ibara Railway (between Kiyone and Sōja)
- Rolling stock: 115 series; 213 series; 227 series; 273 series; 285 series; 381 series; KiHa 120; KiHa 126; EF64; EF65

History
- Opened: 10 August 1919; 107 years ago

Technical
- Line length: 138.4 km (86.0 mi)
- Number of tracks: 2 (Kurashiki – Bitchū-Takahashi); 2 (Ikura – Ishiga); 2 (Niimi – Nunohara); 1 for rest of line
- Track gauge: 1,067 mm (3 ft 6 in)
- Minimum radius: 200 m (660 ft)
- Electrification: 1,500 V DC
- Operating speed: 110 km/h (68 mph) – 120 km/h (75 mph)

The Hakubi Line (伯備線, Hakubi-sen) is a railway line operated by West Japan Railway Company (JR West) in the mountainous area of the Chūgoku region of Japan. It begins at the south end of Okayama Prefecture at Kurashiki Station in Kurashiki, passing through Niimi Station on the west side of Niimi, and terminating at Hōki-Daisen Station in Yonago, Tottori Prefecture, linking Okayama Prefecture and Yonago across the Chūgoku Mountains. The Hakubi Line follows the Takahashi River between Kurashiki and Niimi, and the Hino River between Shōyama and Hōki-Daisen.

As of April 2023, the ICOCA card can be used in all stations between Kurashiki Station and Niimi Station.

== Line data ==
The Okayama Division of JR West has jurisdictional control over operations between Kurashiki and Niizato stations, with the Yonago Division having control between Kami-Iwami and Hōki-Daisen Station. The boundary is midway between Niizato and Kami-Iwami Stations. The line color for the portion covered by the Okayama Division is vermillion orange, while the section covered by the Yonago Division is the standard blue.

== Services ==
=== Limited express ===
- Yakumo
- Sunrise Izumo

== Stations ==
Line	No.	Station	Japanese	Distance (km)	Connecting lines	Location	
Sanyō	V 01	Okayama	岡山	-15.9	Sanyō Shinkansen; Sanyō Main Line; Tsuyama Line; Kibi Line (Momotaro Line); Okaden: ■ Higashiyama Line ■ Seikibashi Line (Both at Okayama-Ekimae)	Kita-ku, Okayama	Okayama
Sanyō	V 02	Kitanagase	北長瀬	-12.5		Kita-ku, Okayama	Okayama
Sanyō	V 03	Niwase	庭瀬	-9.4		Kita-ku, Okayama	Okayama
Sanyō	V 04	Nakashō	中庄	-4.7		Kurashiki	Okayama
Sanyō	V 05	Kurashiki	倉敷	0.0	San'yō Main Line; Mizushima Main Line (Kurashiki-shi Station)	Kurashiki	Okayama
Hakubi	V 05	Kurashiki	倉敷	0.0	San'yō Main Line; Mizushima Main Line (Kurashiki-shi Station)	Kurashiki	Okayama
Hakubi	V 06	Kiyone	清音	7.3	Ibara Line	Sōja	Okayama
Hakubi	V 07	Sōja	総社	10.7	Kibi Line (Momotaro Line); Ibara Line	Sōja	Okayama
Hakubi	V 08	Gōkei	豪渓	15.3		Sōja	Okayama
Hakubi	V 09	Hiwa	日羽	19.0		Sōja	Okayama
Hakubi	V 10	Minagi	美袋	22.7		Sōja	Okayama
Hakubi	V 11	Bitchū-Hirose	備中広瀬	29.6		Takahashi	Okayama
Hakubi	V 12	Bitchū-Takahashi	備中高梁	34.0		Takahashi	Okayama
Hakubi	V 13	Kinoyama	木野山	38.8		Takahashi	Okayama
Hakubi	V 14	Bitchū-Kawamo	備中川面	42.7		Takahashi	Okayama
Hakubi	V 15	Hōkoku	方谷	47.4		Takahashi	Okayama
Hakubi	V 16	Ikura	井倉	55.2		Niimi	Okayama
Hakubi	V 17	Ishiga	石蟹	59.7		Niimi	Okayama
Hakubi	V 18	Niimi	新見	64.4	Kishin Line	Niimi	Okayama
Hakubi		Nunohara	布原	68.3	Hakubi Line trains do not stop at Nunohara	Niimi	Okayama
Hakubi		Bitchū-Kōjiro	備中神代	70.8	Geibi Line	Niimi	Okayama
Hakubi		Ashidachi	足立	77.0		Niimi	Okayama
Hakubi		Niizato	新郷	82.8		Niimi	Okayama
Hakubi		Kami-Iwami	上石見	86.7		Nichinan	Tottori Prefecture
Hakubi		Shōyama	生山	95.4		Nichinan	Tottori Prefecture
Hakubi		Kamisuge	上菅	98.9		Hino	Tottori Prefecture
Hakubi		Kurosaka	黒坂	103.7		Hino	Tottori Prefecture
Hakubi		Neu	根雨	111.3		Hino	Tottori Prefecture
Hakubi		Muko	武庫	116.0		Kofu	Tottori Prefecture
Hakubi		Ebi	江尾	118.1		Kofu	Tottori Prefecture
Hakubi		Hōki-Mizoguchi	伯耆溝口	127.3		Hōki	Tottori Prefecture
Hakubi		Kishimoto	岸本	132.3		Hōki	Tottori Prefecture
Hakubi		Hōki-Daisen	伯耆大山	138.4	San'in Main Line	Yonago	Tottori Prefecture

== Rolling stock ==
- 115 series (until 14 October 2025)
- 213 series
- 227 series
- 273 series
- 285 series
- 381 series
- KiHa 120
- KiHa 126

The experimental "Smart BEST" battery electric train was tested on the Hakubi Line between October and December 2012.

== History ==
The first section of the Hakubi Line to open was the northern section, initially named the Hakubihoku Line (伯備北線; lit. "Hakubi North Line"), between Hōki-Mizoguchi and Hōki-Daisen on 10 August 1919. The northern section was then progressively extended south, to Ebi Station on 25 March 1922, to Neu Station on 30 July 1922, to Kurosaka Station on 10 November 1922, to Shōyama Station on 28 November 1923, to Kami-Iwami Station on 6 December 1924, and to Ashidachi Station on 1 December 1926.

The first section of the southern part of the Hakubi Line, named the Hakubinan Line (伯備南線; lit. "Hakubi South Line"), was opened on 17 February 1925, between Shisawa (now Gōkei) and Kurashiki. The southern section was gradually extended north, extending to Bitchū-Kawamo on 31 July 1927, with connection between the north and south sections being made on 25 October 1928, from which date the entire line was named the Hakubi Line.

The Kiyone to Bitchu-Takahashi section was double-tracked between 1968 and 1973, with the Kurashiki to Kiyone and Niimi to Nunohara sections being double-tracked in 1979, and the Ishiga to Ikuta section double-tracked between 1982 and 1983 in conjunction with a realignment which shortened the route by 1.2 km. CTC signalling was commissioned on the entire line in 1972, and the Kurashiki to Hokidaisen section was electrified in 1982.

=== Timeline ===
- 10 August 1919: The Hakubi North Line opens between Hōki-Mizoguchi and Hōki-Daisen Stations.
- 25 March 1922: The Hakubi North Line opens between Hōki-Mizoguchi and Ebi Stations.
- 30 July 1922: The Hakubi North Line opens between Ebi and Neu Stations.
- 10 November 1922: The Hakubi North Line opens between Neu and Kurosaka Stations.
- 28 November 1923: The Hakubi North Line opens between Kurosaka and Shōyama Stations.
- 6 December 1924: The Hakubi North Line opens between Shōyama and Kami-Iwami Stations.
- 17 February 1925: The Hakubi South Line opens between Kurashiki and Shisawa Station (now Gōkei Station).
- 1 April 1925: The Hakubi North Line opens at Kamisuge Station.
- 17 May 1925: The Hakubi South Line opens between Shisawa and Minagi Stations.
- 20 June 1926: The Hakubi South Line opens between Minagi and Kinoyama Stations.
- 1 December 1926: The Habuki North Line opens between Kami-Iwami and Ashidachi Stations.
- 31 July 1927: The Hakubi South Line opens between Kinoyama and Bitchū-Kawamo Stations.
- 25 October 1928: Service starts between Bitchū-Kawamo and Ashidachi stations. The line is completed and renamed the Hakubi Line.

== See also ==
- List of railway lines in Japan
