= Nunohara Station =

Railway station in Niimi, Okayama Prefecture, Japan

Nunohara Station 布原駅
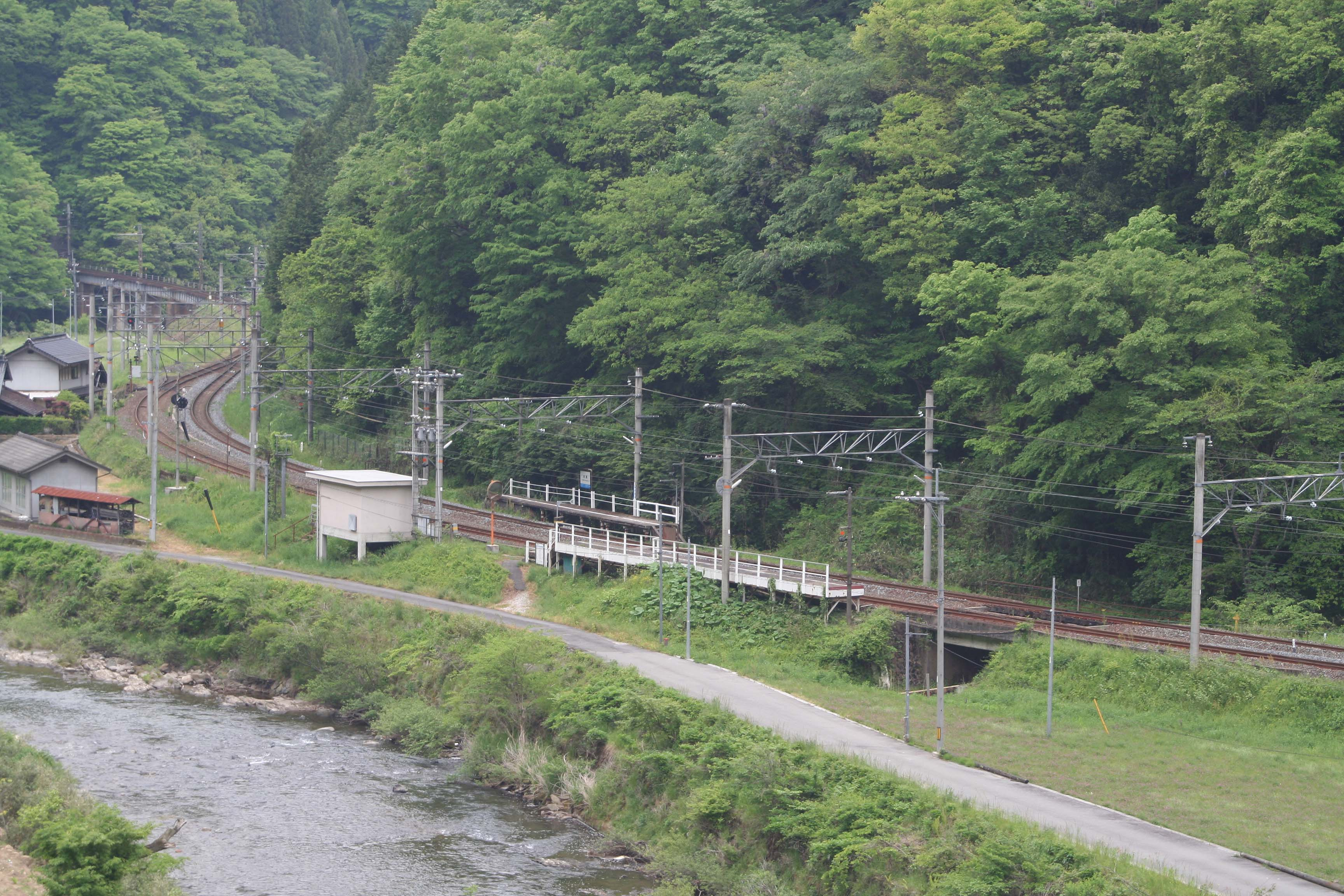
- Nunohara Station, May 2007

General information
- Location: 3701-7 Nunohara Nishikata, Niimi-shi, Okayama-ken 718-0017; Japan
- Coordinates: 34°59′16.59″N 133°25′18.35″E
- Operator: JR West
- Line: V Hakubi Line P Geibi Line
- Distance: 68.3 km (42.4 miles) from Kurashiki
- Platforms: 2 side platforms
- Tracks: 2

Other information
- Status: Unstaffed
- Website: Official website

History
- Opened: 10 October 1936

Passengers
- 2019: 1 daily

Services
Preceding station	JR West	Following station
Bitchū-Kōjiro towards Hiroshima	Geibi Line	Niimi Terminus
Location
- Location within Okayama Prefecture Location within Japan

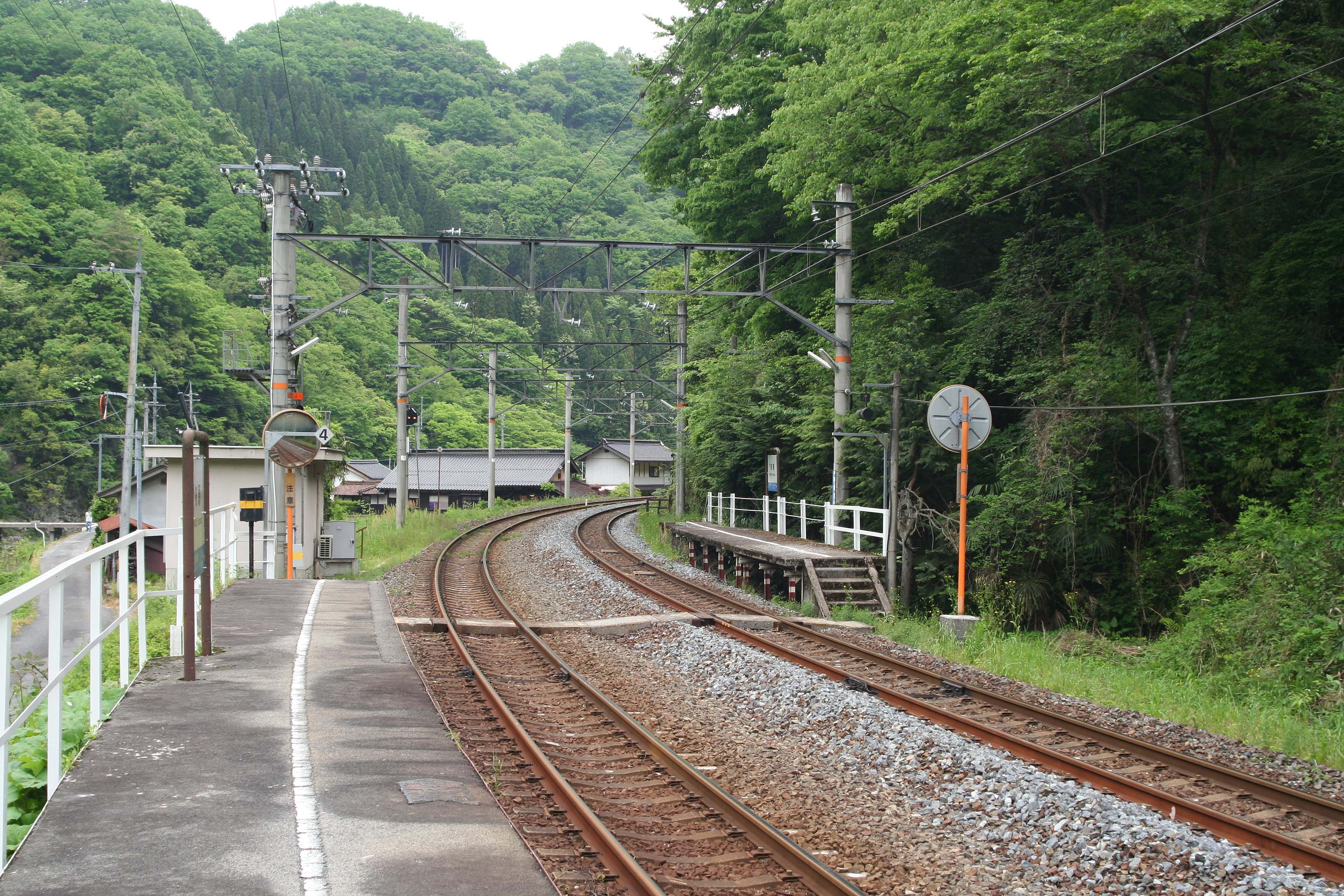
Nunohara tracks and platforms in 2007

Nunohara Station (布原駅, Nunohara-eki) is a junction passenger railway station located in the city of Niimi, Okayama Prefecture, Japan. It is operated by the West Japan Railway Company (JR West).

== Lines ==
Nunohara Station is served by trains of the Geibi Line, which continue past the nominal northern terminus of the line at Bitchū Kōjiro to terminate at Niimi, which is 3.9 kilometers from this station. Trains of the Hakubi Line do not stop at this station, which is 68.3 kilometers from the terminus of the line at Kurashiki.

== Station layout ==
The station consists of two staggered unnumbered side platforms. The platforms are short, and can only accommodate one carriage in length. There is no station building.

=== Platforms ===
entry	■ P Geibi Line	for Niimi
opposite	■ P Geibi Line	for Tōjō and Bingo-Ochiai

== History ==
Nunohara Station opened on October 10, 1936 as a signal stop, and was elevated to a full station on April 1, 1987 .With the privatization of the Japan National Railways (JNR) on April 1, 1987, the station came under the aegis of the West Japan Railway Company.

== Passenger statistics ==
In fiscal 2019, the station was used by an average of 1 passenger daily.

== Surrounding area ==
There is only the Nishikawa River and a few houses near the station. Since the Kawamoto Dam was built downstream of the Nishikawa River, the dam lake extends through a narrow V-shaped valley toward Nunohara Station, but the dam lake does not reach the station. In the past, when steam locomotives were running on the Hakubi Line, Nunohara was still a signal station, and was known as a photography spot for train enthusiasts .

== See also ==
- List of railway stations in Japan
