= Niizato Station =

Railway station in Niimi, Okayama Prefecture, Japan

Niizato Station 新郷駅
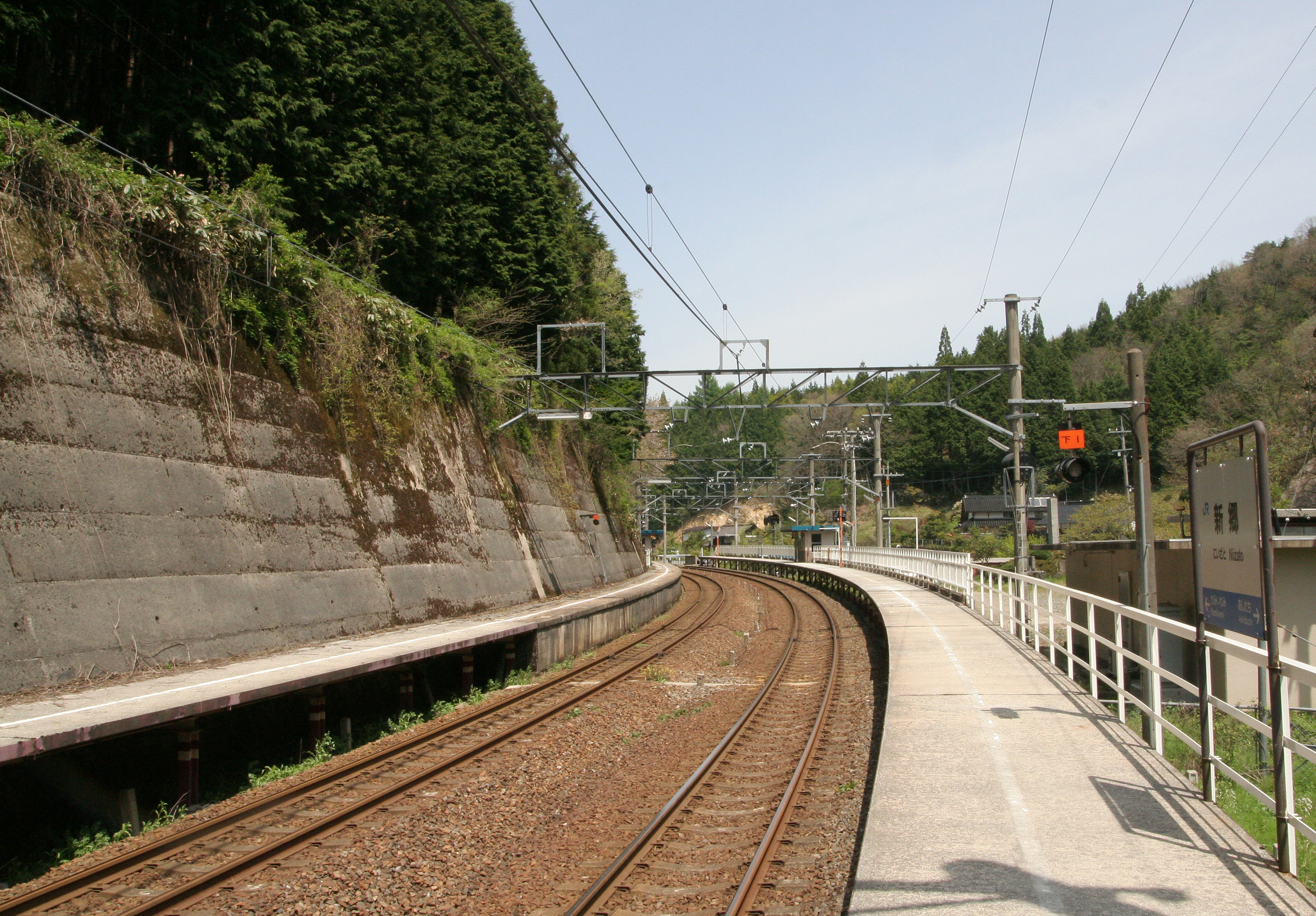
- Niizato Station, May 2008

General information
- Location: 696-2 Shingo Kamamura, Niimi-shi, Okayama-ken 719-2801; Japan
- Coordinates: 35°4′55.51″N 133°22′4.03″E
- Operator: JR West
- Line: V Hakubi Line
- Distance: 82.8 km (51.4 miles) from Kurashiki
- Platforms: 2 side platforms
- Tracks: 2

Other information
- Status: Unstaffed
- Website: Official website

History
- Opened: 15 December 1953

Passengers
- 2019: 6 daily
Location
- Location within Okayama Prefecture Location within Japan

Niizato Station (新郷駅, Niizato-eki) is a passenger railway station located in the city of Niimi, Okayama Prefecture, Japan. It is operated by the West Japan Railway Company (JR West).

== Lines ==
Niisato Station is served by the Hakubi Line, and is located 82.8 kilometers from the terminus of the line at Kurashiki and 98.7 kilometers from Okayama.

== Station layout ==
The station consists of two opposed side platforms on an embankment, connected by a level crossing. There is no station building and the station is unattended.

=== Platforms ===
1	■ V Hakubi Line	for Kurashiki and Okayama
2	■ V Hakubi Line	for Yonago

== Adjacent stations ==
«	Service	»
Hakubi Line
Ashidachi	-	Kami-Iwami

== History ==
Although the railroad began to pass through this area from December 1, 1926, no station was constructed in Shingo village (now part of Niimi city), and residents were forced to cross a mountain pass on foot and use Kami-Iwami Station in Tottori Prefecture. After World War II, the local mayor petitioned for the construction of a station, and about 3,200,000 yen was raised for expenses associated building a station by selling timber from the village forest.The center of the village is the confluence point of a river, and the railroad tracks cross over a slightly elevated position with an iron bridge, making it a difficult location for the construction of the station building. Therefore, it was decided to seek a site a little further south of the village for the construction of the station. Niizato Station opened on December 15, 1953. With the privatization of the Japan National Railways (JNR) on April 1, 1987, the station came under the aegis of the West Japan Railway Company.

== Passenger statistics ==
In fiscal 2019, the station was used by an average of 6 passengers daily.

== Surrounding area ==
- Niimi City Hall Shingo Civic Center
- Niimi Municipal Kango Kita Elementary School

== See also ==
- List of railway stations in Japan
