= Ashidachi Station =

Railway station in Niimi, Okayama Prefecture, Japan

Ashidachi Station 足立駅
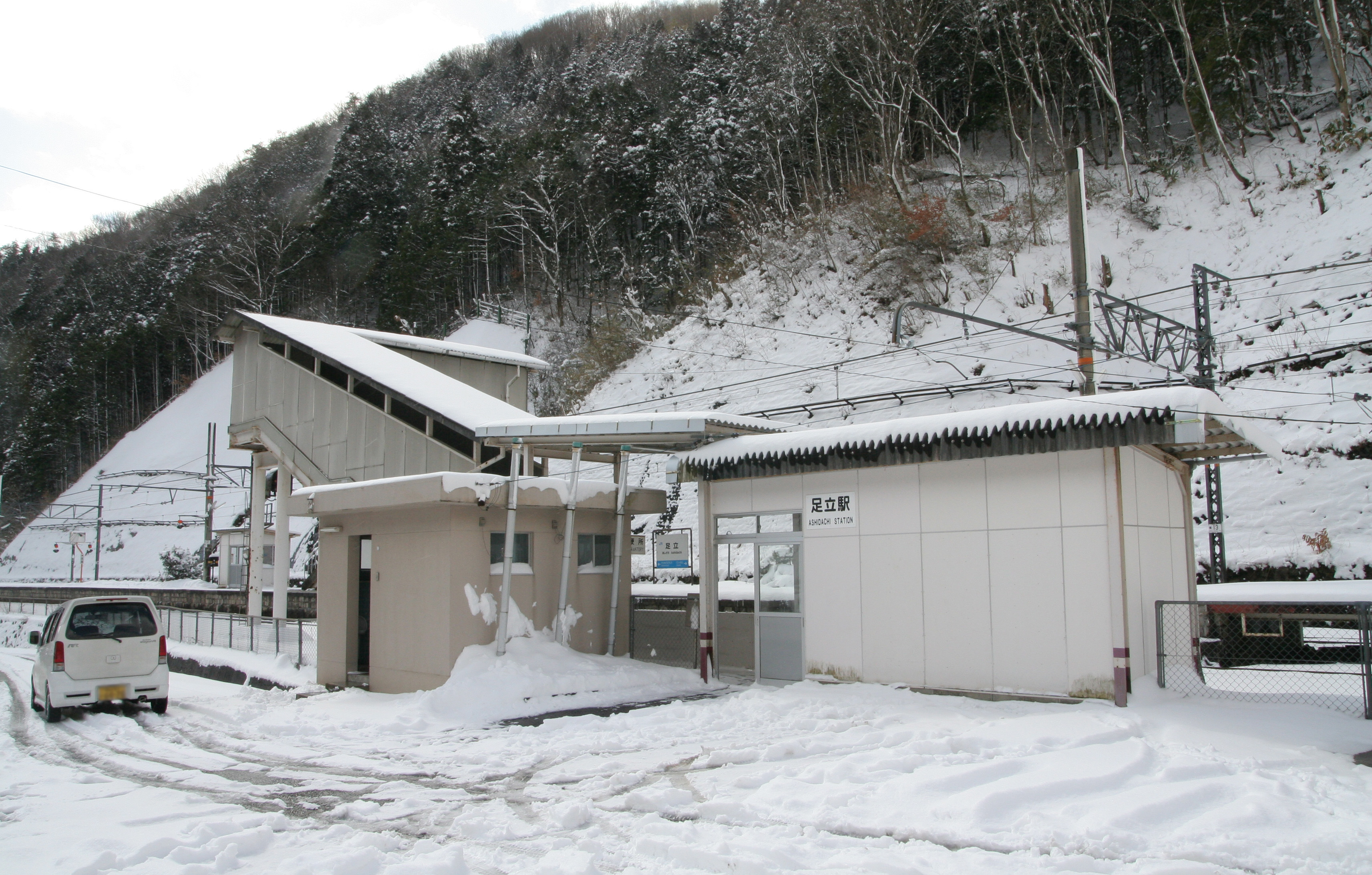
- Ashidachi Station, February 2008

General information
- Location: 1333 Shingo Yuno, Niimi-shi, Okayama-ken 719-3612; Japan
- Coordinates: 35°2′20.07″N 133°23′1.09″E
- Operator: JR West
- Line: V Hakubi Line
- Distance: 77.0 km (47.8 miles) from Kurashiki
- Platforms: 1 island platform
- Tracks: 2

Other information
- Status: Unstaffed
- Website: Official website

History
- Opened: 1 December 1926

Passengers
- 2019: 4 daily
Location
- Location within Okayama Prefecture Location within Japan

Ashidachi Station (足立駅, Ashidachi-eki) is a passenger railway station located in the city of Niimi, Okayama Prefecture, Japan. It is operated by the West Japan Railway Company (JR West).

== Lines ==
Ashidachi Station is served by the Hakubi Line, and is located 77.0 kilometers from the terminus of the line at Kurashiki and 92.9 kilometers from Okayama.

== Station layout ==
The station consists of one island platform, connected by a footbridge to a small station building on the east side of the tracks. The station is unattended.

=== Platforms ===
1	■ V Hakubi Line	for Kurashiki and Okayama
2	■ V Hakubi Line	for Yonago

== Adjacent stations ==
«	Service	»
Hakubi Line
Bitchū-Kōjiro	-	Niizato

== History ==
Ashidachi Station opened on December 1, 1926. With the privatization of the Japan National Railways (JNR) on April 1, 1987, the station came under the aegis of the West Japan Railway Company.

== Passenger statistics ==
In fiscal 2019, the station was used by an average of 6 passengers daily.

== Surrounding area ==
- Nishikawa
- Ashidachi Lime Industry
- Niimi Ashidachi Post Office
- Okayama Prefectural Road/Tottori Prefectural Road No. 8 Niimi Nichinan Line

== See also ==
- List of railway stations in Japan
