= Bitchū-Kōjiro Station =

Railway station in Niimi, Okayama Prefecture, Japan

Bitchū-Kōjiro Station 備中神代駅
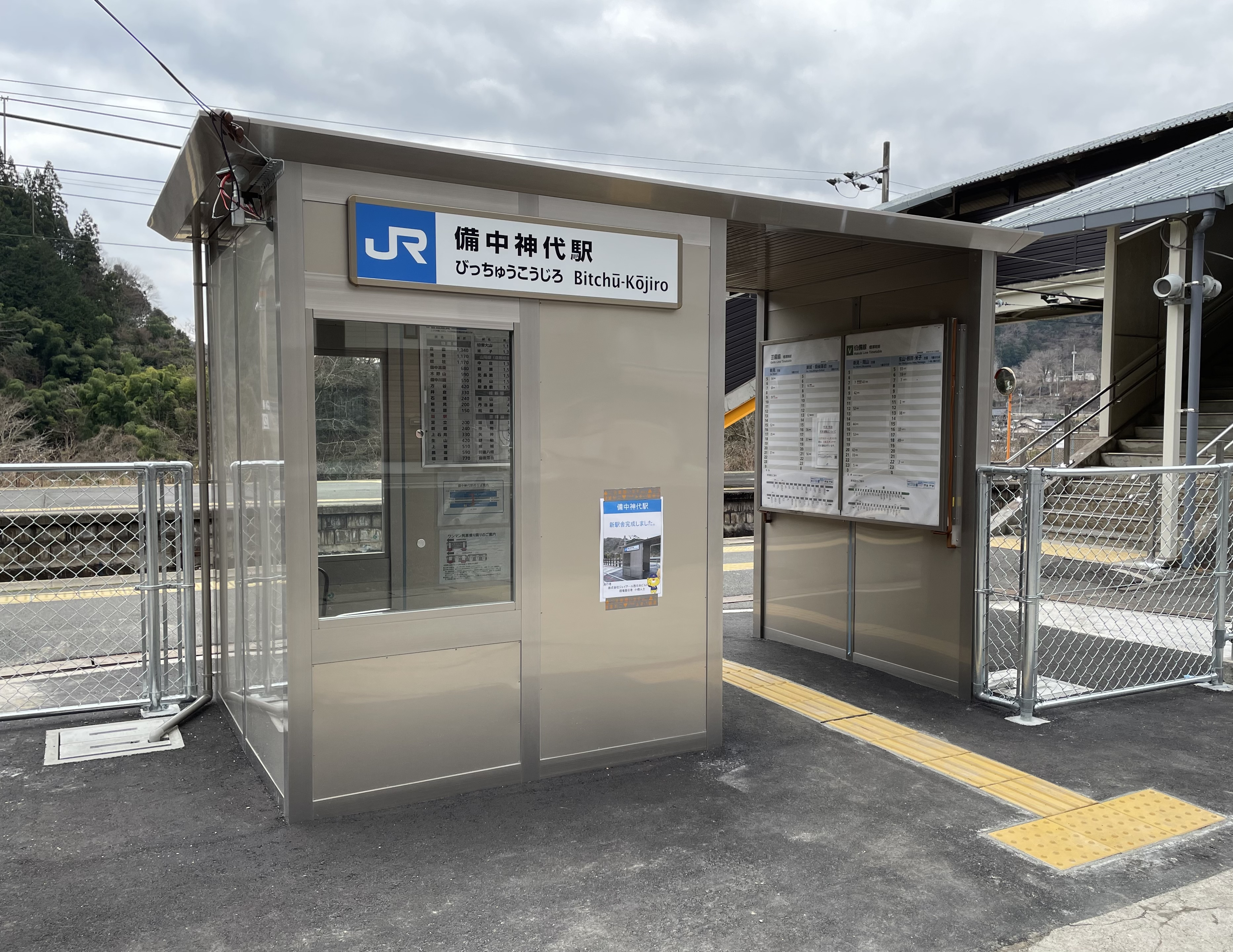
- Bitchū-Kōjiro Station, December 2022

General information
- Location: 3899-Shohei Nishikata, Niimi-shi, Okayama-ken 718-0017; Japan
- Coordinates: 34°59′40.50″N 133°24′2.91″E
- Operator: JR West
- Line: V Hakubi Line P Geibi Line
- Distance: 70.8 km (44.0 miles) from Kurashiki
- Platforms: 1 side + 1 island platform
- Tracks: 3

Other information
- Status: Unstaffed
- Website: Official website

History
- Opened: 25 October 1928

Passengers
- 2019: 4 daily

Services
Preceding station	JR West	Following station
Sakane towards Hiroshima	Geibi Line	Nunohara towards Niimi
Ashidachi towards Yonago	Hakubi Line	Niimi towards Okayama
Location
- Location within Okayama Prefecture Location within Japan

Bitchū-Kōjiro Station (備中神代駅, Bitchū-Kōjiro-eki) is a junction passenger railway station located in the city of Niimi, Okayama Prefecture, Japan. It is operated by the West Japan Railway Company (JR West).

== Lines ==
Bitchū-Kōjiro Station is served by the Hakubi Line, and is located 70.8 kilometers from the terminus of the line at Kurashiki and 86.7 kilometers from Okayama. It is also the nominal northern terminus of the 159.1 kilometer Geibi Line to Hiroshima, although most trains terminate 6.4 kilometers further south at Niimi.

== Station layout ==
The station consists of one ground-level side platform and one island platform, connected by a footbridge. The station is unattended. At the entrance to the station platform, the entrance gate of the old station building was preserved when the old station building was replaced by a simple structure which doubled as a waiting room in 2001.

=== Platforms ===
1, 2	■ V Hakubi Line	for Kurashiki and Okayama for Yonago
3	■ P Geibi Line	for Niimi for Tōjō and Bingo-Ochiai

Platform sign at the station

On the platform, looking toward Tōjō

On the platform, looking toward Niimi

An express train headed to Okayama Station, and another headed to Yonago Station

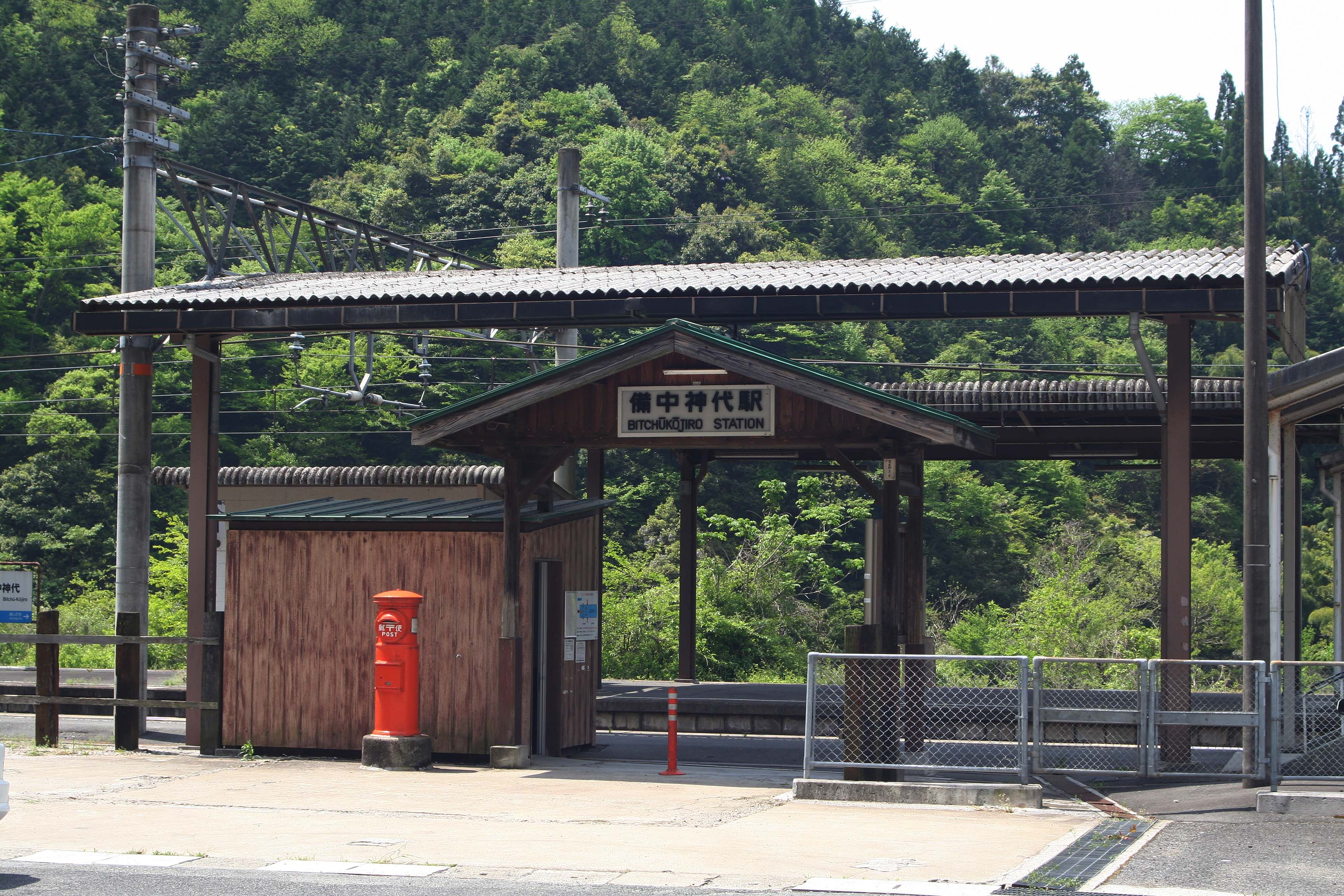
The station building in 2007

== History ==
Bitchū-Kōjiro Station opened on October 25, 1928 with the opening of the Hakubi Line. On February 10,1930, services on the Sanshin Line (now the Geibi Line) began.With the privatization of the Japan National Railways (JNR) on April 1, 1987, the station came under the aegis of the West Japan Railway Company.

== Passenger statistics ==
In fiscal 2019, the station was used by an average of 4 passengers daily.

== Surrounding area ==
- Niimi City Shingō Branch Office
- Japan National Route 182

== See also ==
- List of railway stations in Japan
