= Ishiga Station =

Railway station in Niimi, Okayama Prefecture, Japan

Ishiga Station 石蟹駅
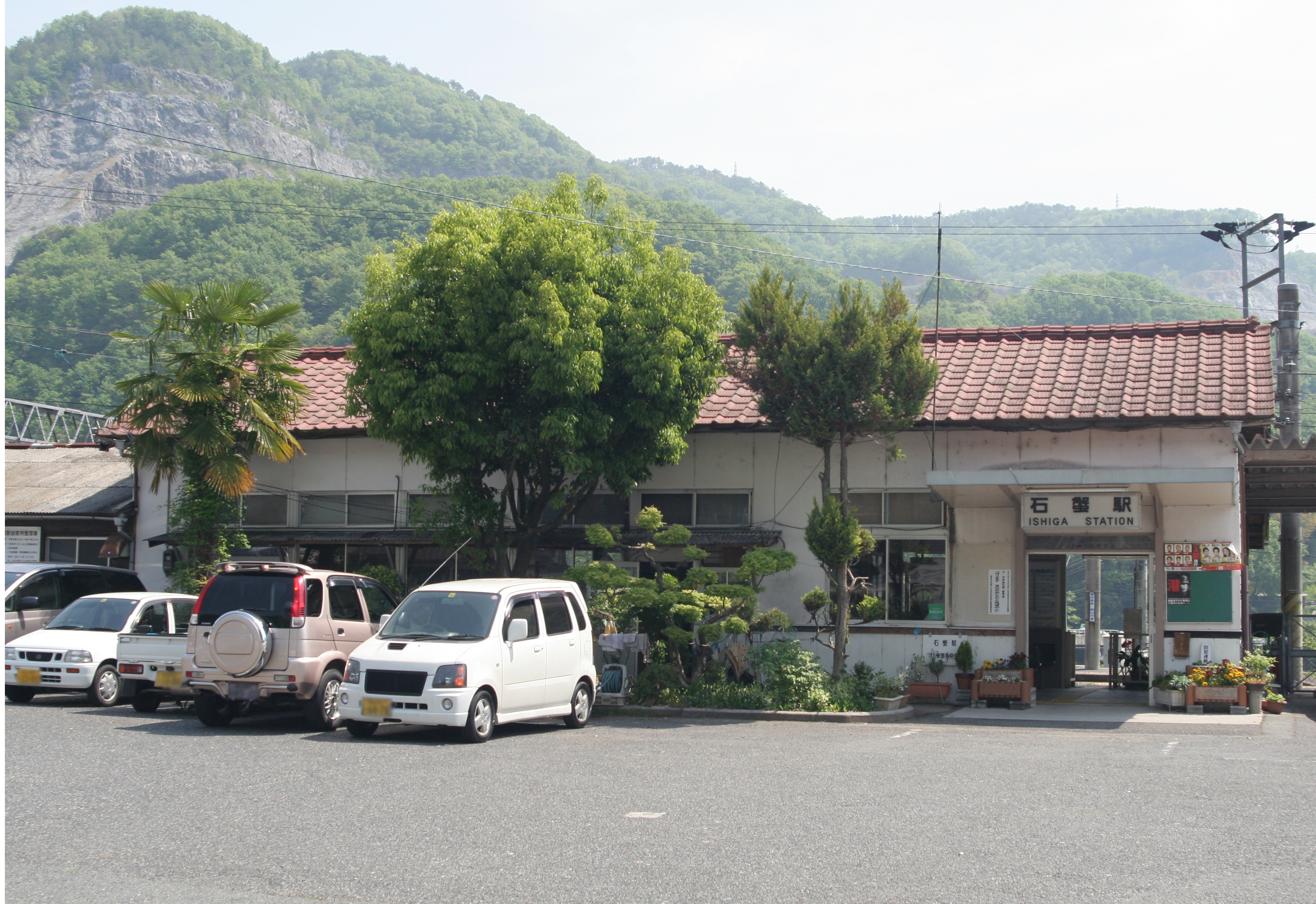
- Ishiga Station, May 2007

General information
- Location: 90-7 Ishida, Niimi-shi, Okayama-ken 718-0015; Japan
- Coordinates: 34°57′16.53″N 133°28′45.93″E
- Operator: JR West
- Line: V Hakubi Line
- Distance: 59.7 km (37.1 miles) from Kurashiki
- Platforms: 1 side + 1 island platform
- Tracks: 3

Other information
- Status: Unstaffed
- Station code: JR-V17
- Website: Official website

History
- Opened: 25 October 1928

Passengers
- 2019: 89 daily
Location
- Location within Okayama Prefecture Location within Japan

Ishiga Station (石蟹駅, Ishiga-eki) is a passenger railway station located in the city of Niimi, Okayama Prefecture, Japan. It is operated by the West Japan Railway Company (JR West).

== Lines ==
Ishiga Station is served by the Hakubi Line, and is located 59.7 kilometers from the terminus of the line at Kurashiki and 75.67 kilometers from Okayama.

== Station layout ==
The station consists of one side platform and one island platform. The station building is located next to the side platform and connected to the island platform by a footbridge. The station is unattended.

=== Platforms ===
1	■ V Hakubi Line	for Kurashiki and Okayama
2	■ V Hakubi Line	siding
3	■ V Hakubi Line	for Yonago

== Adjacent stations ==
«	Service	»
Hakubi Line
Ikura	-	Niimi

== History ==
Ishiga Station opened on October 25, 1928. With the privatization of the Japan National Railways (JNR) on April 1, 1987, the station came under the aegis of the West Japan Railway Company.

== Passenger statistics ==
In fiscal 2019, the station was used by an average of 89 passengers daily.

== Surrounding area ==
- Niimi City Niimi Minami Junior High School
- Niimi City Niimi Minami Elementary School
- Takahashi River

== See also ==
- List of railway stations in Japan
