= Kamochi Shrine =

Shinto shrine in Tottori Prefecture, Japan

Kamochi Jinja (金持神社)
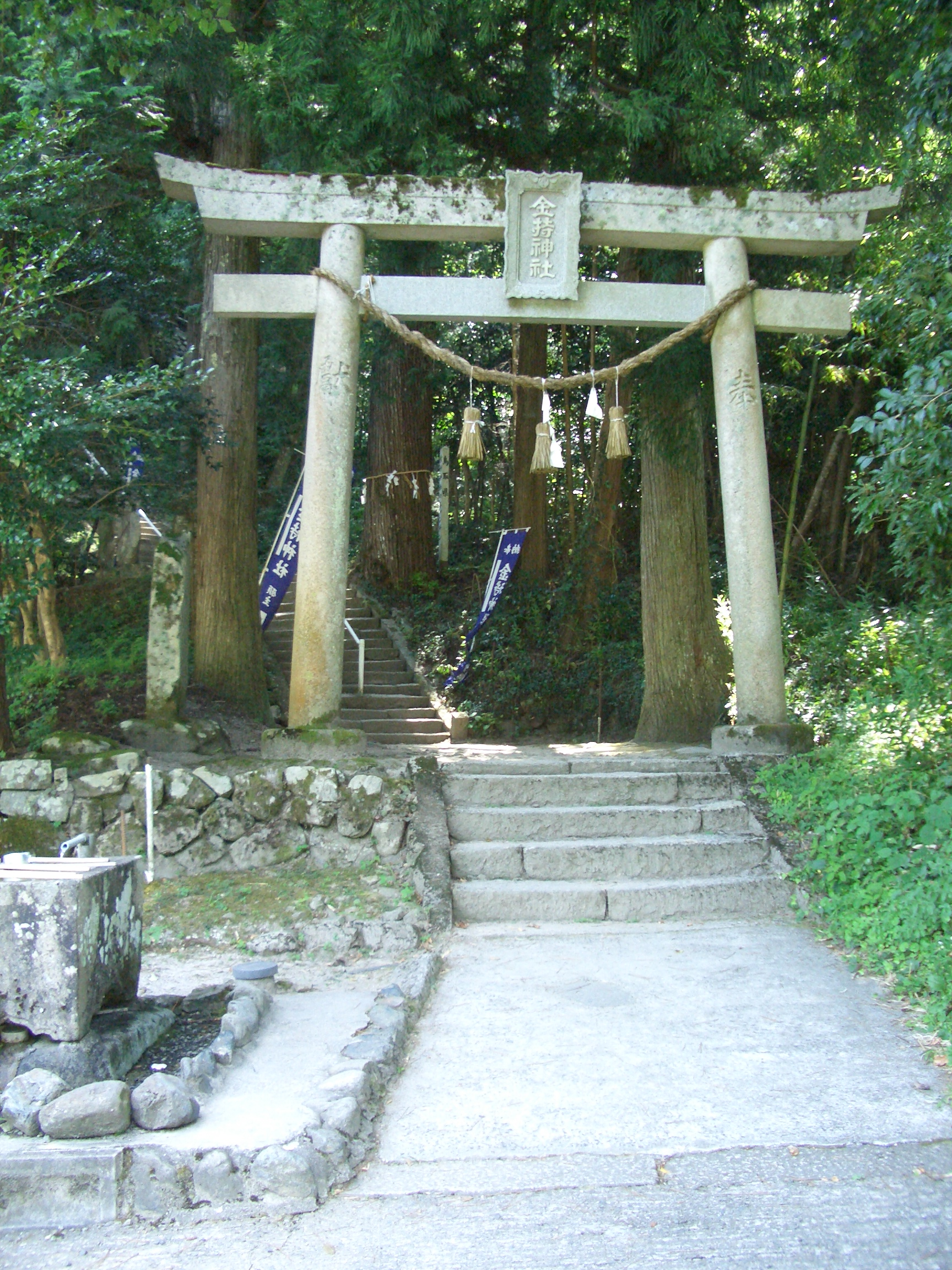
- Torii and path leading to Kamochi Jinja

- Location within Japan

Religion
- Affiliation: Shinto
- Deity: Omizunu, Amenotokotachi

Location
- Interactive map of Kamochi Jinja (金持神社)
- Coordinates: 35°12′54.7″N 133°27′33″E

Kamochi Jinja (金持神社) is an ancient Shinto shrine in Hino, Tottori Prefecture, Japan. Its name is regarded as auspicious.
