= Takahashi River =

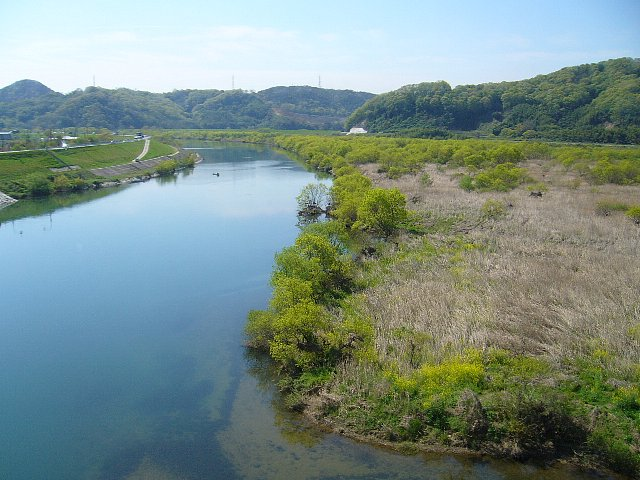
- Takahashi River near Kiyone Station in Okayama Prefecture

Location
- Country: Japan

Physical characteristics
- Source
  - location: Okayama Prefecture, with tributaries in Hiroshima Prefecture
  - elevation: 1,188 m (3,898 ft)
- Mouth
  - location: Inland Sea
  - elevation: 0 m (0 ft)
- Length: 111 km (69 mi)
- Basin size: 2,670 km^{2} (1,030 sq mi)
- Discharge
  - average: 63.93 m^{3}/s (2,258 cu ft/s)

The Takahashi River (高梁川, Takahashi-gawa) is a Class A major river in the western part of Okayama Prefecture. It acts as the main drainage for the Takahashi River Drainage System, and is one of the three main drainage rivers in Okayama Prefecture (the others being the Yoshii River and the Asahi River).

== Description ==
The Takahashi River originates from Akechi Pass near Hanamiyama in Tottori Prefecture, 1,188 m (3,898 ft) above sea level. It flows through the cities of Niimi, Takahashi, Sōja, and Kurashiki, eventually flowing into the Mizushimanada area of the Inland Sea. The mouth is located between the Mizushima and Tamashima areas of Kurashiki. Reconstruction and repairs in 1907 created the eastern and western branches of the Takahashi River.

== Major tributaries ==
- Nariwa River (成羽川, Nariwa-gawa): Flows from the northeast area of Hiroshima Prefecture to the western part of Okayama Prefecture.
