= Japan National Route 180 =

National highway in Japan

National Route 180
- 国道180号
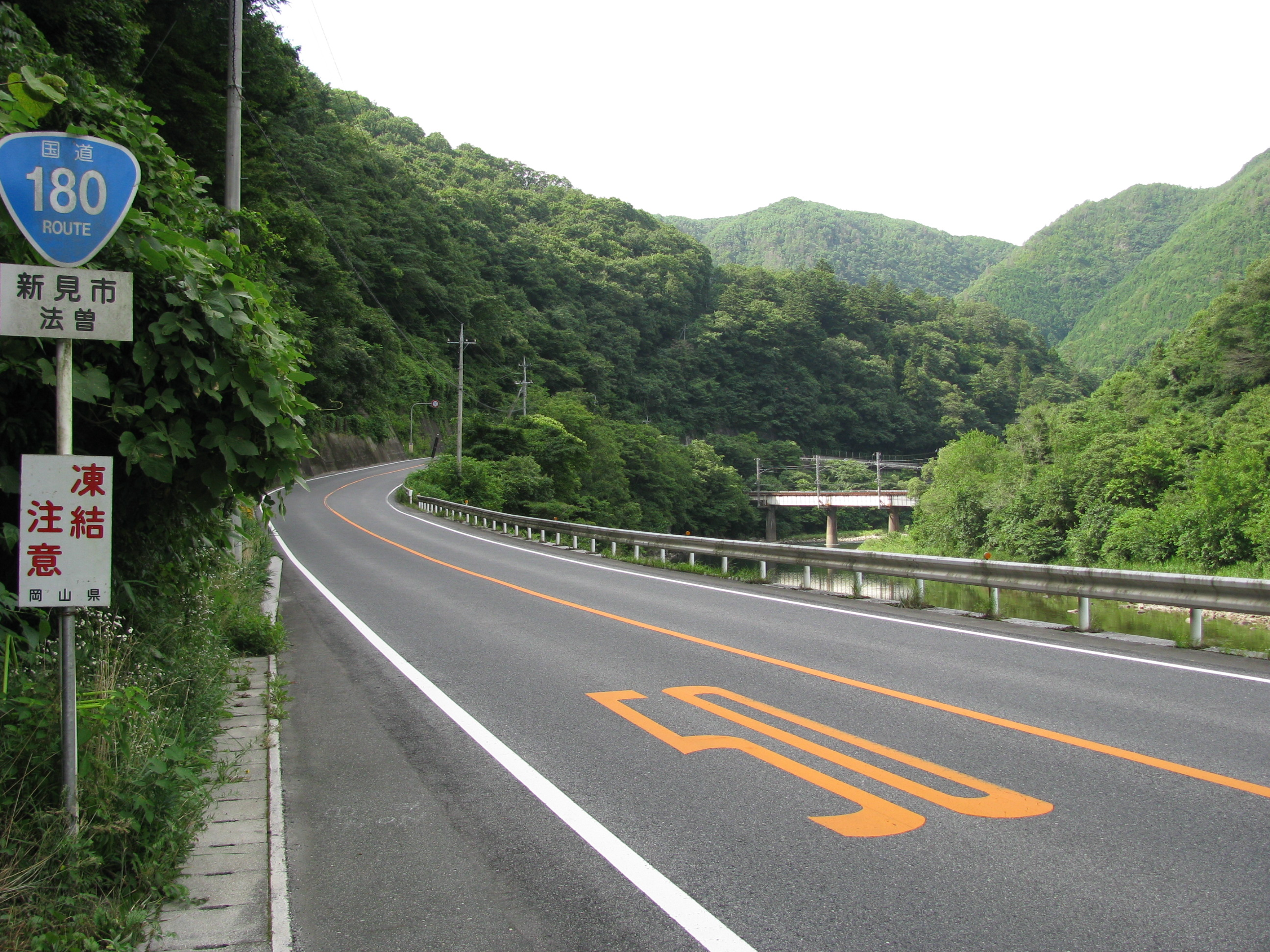

Route information
- Length: 198.9 km (123.6 mi)
- Existed: 18 May 1953–present

Major junctions
- North end: National Route 9 / National Route 54 / National Route 432 in Matsue
- South end: National Route 30 / National Route 53 / National Route 250 in Kita-ku, Okayama

Location
- Country: Japan

Highway system
- National highways of Japan; Expressways of Japan
← National Route 179	→ National Route 181

National Route 180 is a national highway of Japan connecting Okayama and Matsue in Japan, with a total length of 198.9 km (123.6 mi).
