= Niimi Station =

Railway station in Niimi, Okayama Prefecture, Japan

Niimi Station 新見駅
- Niimi Station, June 2023

General information
- Location: 471 Nishigata, Niimi-shi, Okayama-ken 718-0017; Japan
- Coordinates: 34°59′14.78″N 133°27′24.20″E
- Operator: JR West
- Line: V Hakubi Line P Geibi Line K Kishin Line
- Distance: 64.4 km (40.0 miles) from Kurashiki
- Platforms: 2 island platforms
- Tracks: 6

Other information
- Status: Staffed (Midori no Madoguchi)
- Station code: JR-V18
- Website: Official website

History
- Opened: 25 October 1928

Passengers
- 2019: 733 daily
Location
- Location within Okayama Prefecture Location within Japan

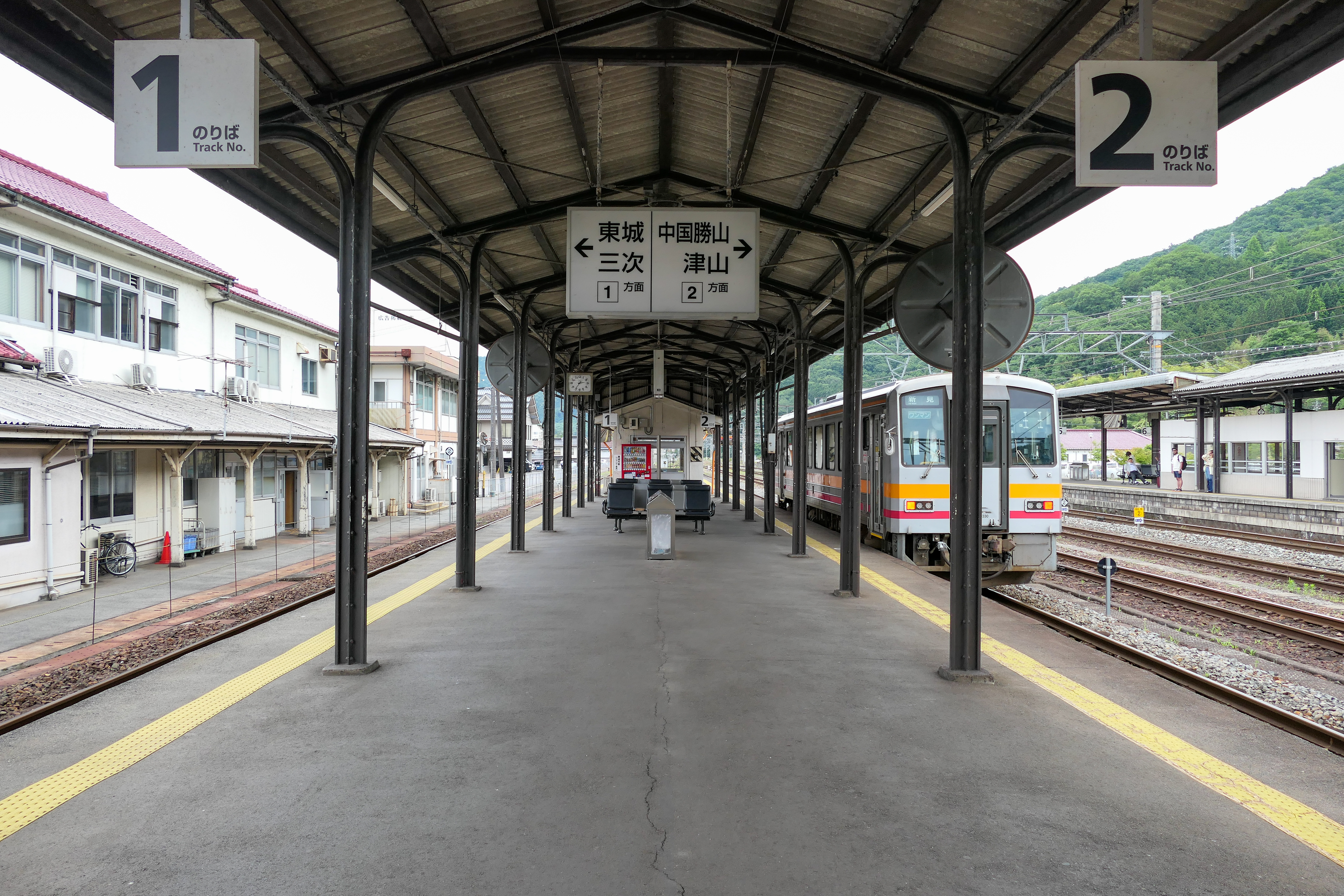
Platforms 1 and 2 at Niimi Station, 2023

Platforms 5 and 6 at Niimi Station, 2024

A Oneman train to Bingo Ochiai at Niimi Station, 2006

Niimi Station (新見駅, Niimi-eki) is a junction passenger railway station located in the city of Niimi, Okayama Prefecture, Japan. It is operated by the West Japan Railway Company (JR West).

== Lines ==
Niimi Station is served by the Hakubi Line, and is located 64.4 kilometers from the terminus of the line at Kurashiki and 84.3 kilometers from Okayama. Although the nominal terminus of the Geibi Line to Hiroshima is at Bitchū-Kōjiro, most trains continue an additional 6.4 kilometers further north to terminate at Niimi. The station is also the northern terminus of the 158.1 kilometer Kishin Line to Himeji.

== Station layout ==
The station consists of two island platforms and four tracks. There are two tracks without platforms between the island platforms, and all freight trains stop on these tracks, and they are also used to switch trains arriving at and departing from this station. The platform and the station building are connected by an underpass. The station building is a two-story wooden structure covered with tiles, and has a Midori no Madoguchi staffed ticket office.

=== Platforms ===
1	■ P Geibi Line	for Tōjō and Bingo-Ochiai
2	■ K Kishin Line	for Chūgoku-Katsuyama, Tsuyama and Sayo
5	■ V Hakubi Line	for Kurashiki and Okayama
6	■ V Hakubi Line	for Yonago and Matsue

== Adjacent stations ==
«	Service	»
Hakubi Line
Ishiga	-	Bitchū-Kōjiro
Kishin Line
Iwayama	-	Terminus
Geibi Line
Nunohara	-	Terminus

== History ==
Niimi Station opened on October 25, 1928, with the opening of the Hakubi Line. With the privatization of the Japan National Railways (JNR) on April 1, 1987, the station came under the aegis of the West Japan Railway Company.

== Passenger statistics ==
In fiscal 2019, the station was used by an average of 733 passengers daily.

== Surrounding area ==
- Okayama Prefecture Bicchu Prefectural Citizens Bureau Niimi Regional Office
- Niimi Chamber of Commerce and Industry
- Niimi Municipal Niimi Daiichi Junior High School
- Okayama Prefectural Niimi High School
- Niimi Public University

== See also ==
- List of railway stations in Japan
