= Hoki =

Hoki can mean:

- Hōki Province, was an old province of Japan, today part of the Tottori Prefecture
- Hōki, Tottori, a town in Japan
- Hōki, a Japanese era name from 770 through 781
- Hoki (fish), another name for blue grenadier, a merluccid hake of the genus Macruronus
- Hoki, a Japanese surname

== See also ==
- Virginia Tech Hokies
