= List of cities in Tottori Prefecture by population =

The following list sorts all cities (including towns and villages) in the Japanese prefecture of Tottori with a population of more than 5,000 according to the 2020 Census. As of October 1, 2020, 14 places fulfill this criterion and are listed here. This list refers only to the population of individual cities, towns and villages within their defined limits, which does not include other municipalities or suburban areas within urban agglomerations.

== List ==
The following table lists the 14 cities, towns and villages in Tottori with a population of at least 5,000 on October 1, 2020, according to the 2020 Census. The table also gives an overview of the evolution of the population since the 1995 census.

Rank (2020)	Name	Status	2020	2015	2010	2005	2000	1995
1	Tottori	City	188,614	193,717	197,449	201,740	200,744	197,959
2	Yonago	City	147,421	149,313	148,271	149,584	147,837	143,856
3	Kurayoshi	City	46,526	49,044	50,720	52,592	54,027	55,669
4	Sakaiminato	City	32,760	34,174	35,259	36,459	36,843	37,365
5	Kotoura	Town	16,373	17,416	18,531	19,499	20,442	21,184
6	Yurihama	Town	16,062	16,550	17,029	17,525	17,381	17,167
7	Yazu	Town	15,945	16,985	18,427	19,434	20,245	20,806
8	Daisen	Town	15,405	16,470	17,491	18,897	19,561	20,563
9	Hokuei	Town	14,238	14,820	15,442	16,052	16,915	17,228
10	Iwami	Town	10,811	11,485	12,362	13,270	14,015	14,713
11	Hōki	Town	10,710	11,118	11,621	12,343	12,663	12,709
12	Nanbu	Town	10,319	10,950	11,536	12,070	12,210	12,345
13	Chizu	Town	6,436	7,154	7,718	8,647	9,383	10,082
14	Misasa	Town	6,068	6,490	7,015	7,509	7,921	8,356
