= Tottori earthquake =

Tottori earthquake may refer to:

- 1943 Tottori earthquake
- 2000 Tottori earthquake
- 2016 Tottori earthquake
