= Ōgamiyama Shrine =

Shinto shrine in Tottori Prefecture, Japan

Ōgamiyama Jinja (大神山神社, Ōgamiyama Jinja)
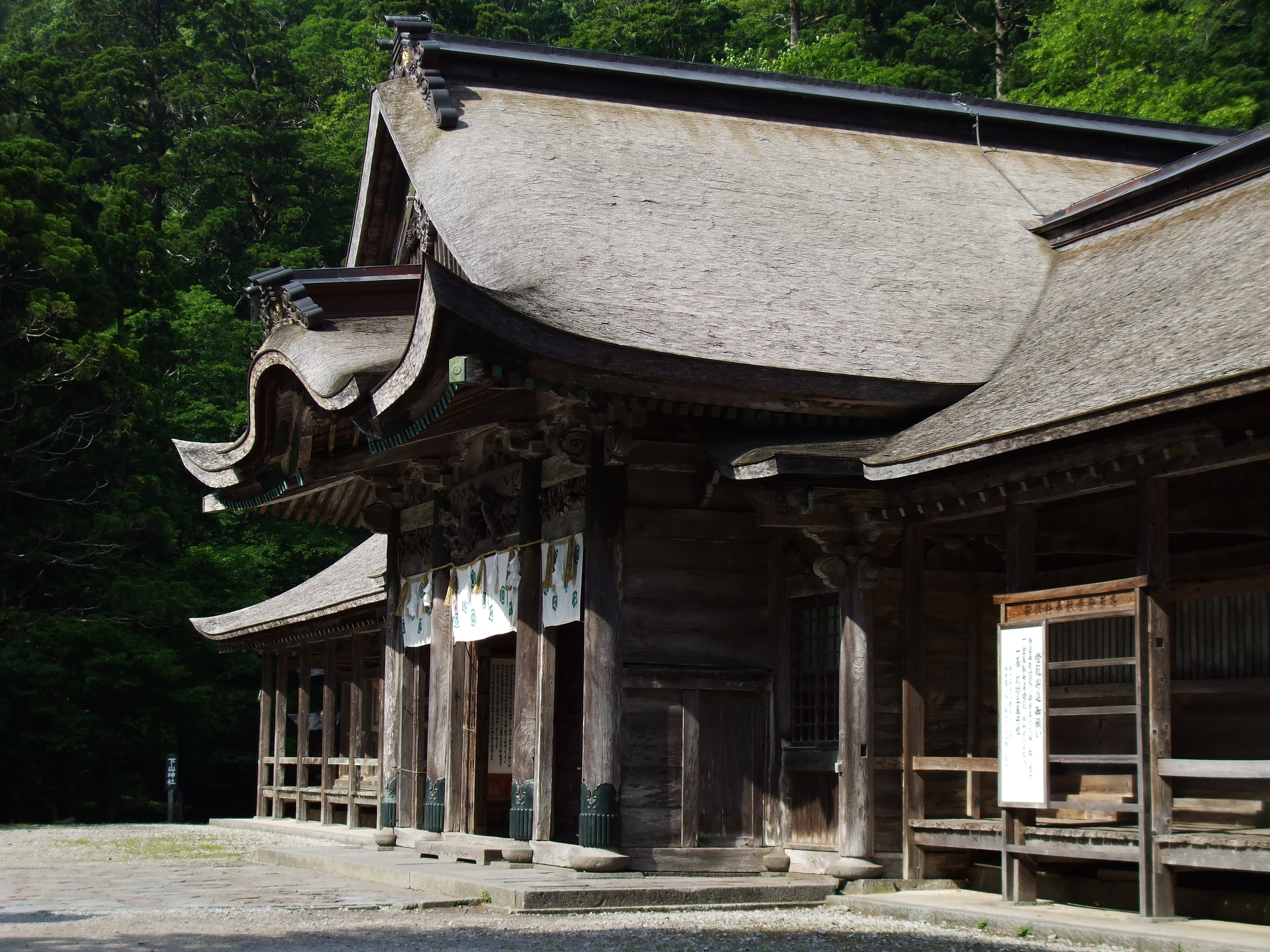
- The Main Building

- Location within Japan

Religion
- Affiliation: Shinto

Location
- Interactive map of Ōgamiyama Jinja (大神山神社, Ōgamiyama Jinja)
- Coordinates: 35°23′18.9″N 133°32′19.4″E

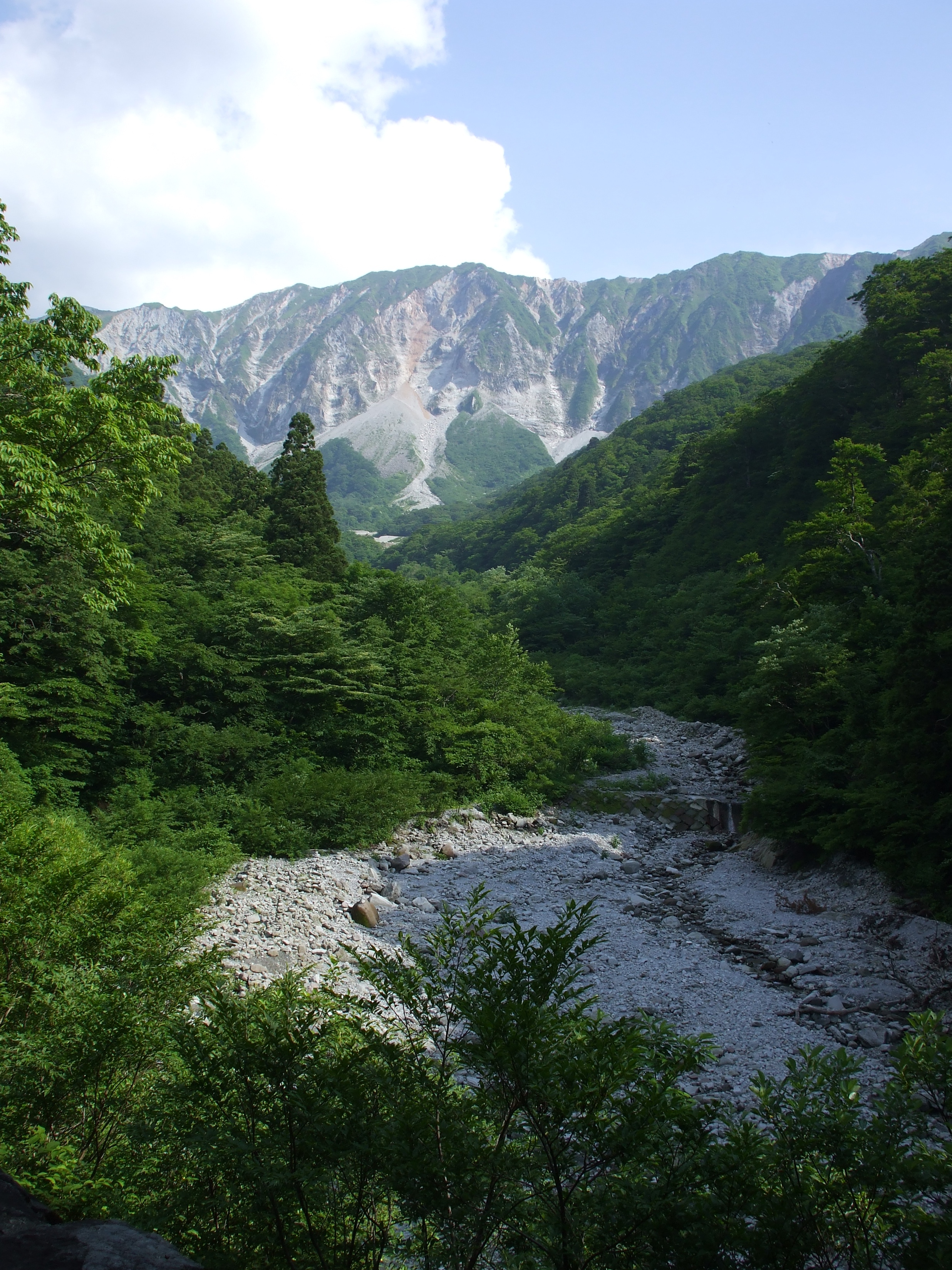
Saino Kawara

Ōgamiyama Jinja (大神山神社, Ōgamiyama Jinja) is a Shinto shrine, in Daisen, Tottori, Japan. A number of its structures have been designated Important Cultural Properties.

== Origins ==
Ōgamiyama Jinja is a complex of Shinto shrines, which were created to worship Daisen. Daisen has been worshiped as a holy mountain at least since the 8th century. Originally this shrine was constructed as a simple building 998 metres (3,274 ft) above sea level on a peak 1,725 metres (5,659 ft) in height. The small building was set up as a shrine in the Heian period.

== History ==
The original location of this shrine is covered by heavy snow in winter, so another branch of this shrine was built at the foot of the mountain. It is called the winter shrine. In turn, the original shrine was called the summer shrine. The winter shrine was originally built at Maruyama, Kishimoto, but moved to Fukumahara and Odaka in Yonago. The summer shrine has remained in its original location since Heian Period. With the Shinbutsu bunri, literally Shinto-Buddhism-separation after the Meiji restoration, this shrine was formally separated from Daisen-ji, and the summer shrine was renamed Okumiya of Ogami Jinja and the Buddhist objects of worship were removed. The current main object of worship is "Oanamuchi no Kami".

In the modern system of ranked Shinto Shrines, Ōgamiyama was listed among the 3rd class of nationally significant shrines or kokuhei-shōsha (国幣小社).

== Important Cultural Properties ==
- Okumiya Honden - Heiden - Haiden (1805)
- Massha Shimoyama Honden - Heiden - Haiden (1805)
- Large stone Torii (1854)
