= Kōfu, Tottori =

Kōfu 江府町
- Town
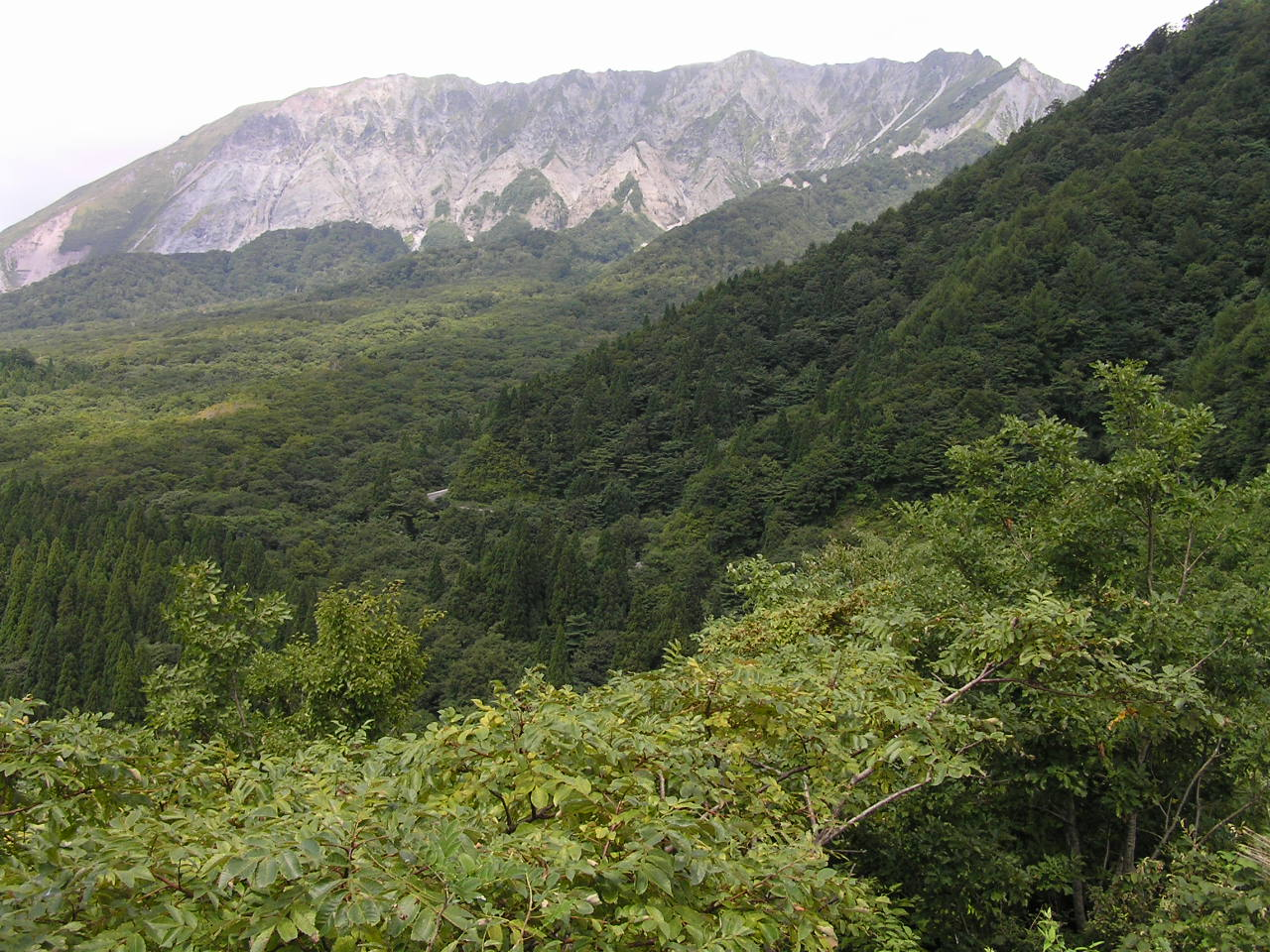
- Mount Kagikake, Kōfu, Tottori

- Flag Seal
- Interactive map of Kōfu
- Coordinates: 35°17′N 133°29′E
- Country: Japan
- Region: Chūgoku; San'in
- Prefecture: Tottori
- District: Hino

Government
  - Mayor: Toshirō Takeuchi (elected 2004)

Area
  - Total: 124.52 km^{2} (48.08 sq mi)

Population (March 31, 2021)
  - Total: 2,737
  - Density: 21.98/km^{2} (56.93/sq mi)
- Time zone: UTC+9 (Japan Standard Time)
- Tree: Japanese Beech (Buna)
- Flower: Iris
- Phone number: 0859-75-2211
- Address: 475 Ebi, Kōfu-chō, Tottori-ken 1689-4401
- Website: www.town-kofu.jp (in Japanese)

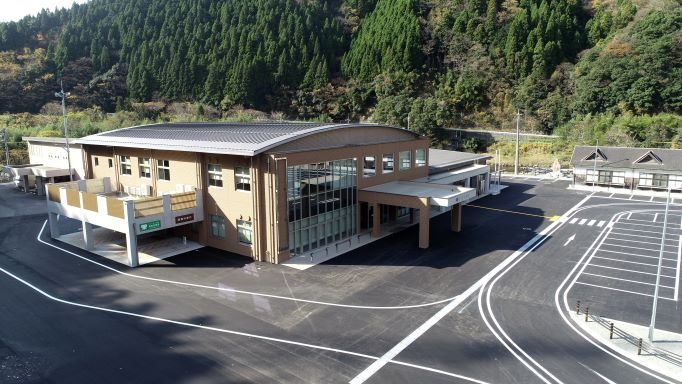
Kōfu Town Hall

Kōfu (江府町, Kōfu-chō) is a town located in the northeast of Hino District, Tottori Prefecture, Japan. As of 31 March 2021, the town had an estimated population of 2,737 in 1023 households and a population density of 22 persons per km^{2}. The total area of the town is 124.52 square kilometres (48.08 sq mi).

== Etymology ==
The name of the town of Kōfu was chosen in a referendum by its residents. In the Japanese language it is formed from two kanji characters. The first, 江, means "water", and the second, 府 means "center" or "core".

== Geography ==
Kōfu is located in the Chūgoku Mountains in western Tottori Prefecture. The northeast part of the town is on a plateau composed of pyroclastic soil at the southern foot of Mount Daisen. The Hino River flows through the western part of the town. The southern part of the town, which borders Okayama Prefecture, is at a high altitude and is dominated by Mount Giboshi (1,110 metres (3,640 ft)), Mount Mihira (1,009.8 metres (3,313 ft)), and Mount Kenashi (1,218.4 metres (3,997 ft)).

=== Neighboring municipalities ===
Tottori Prefecture

- Hino
- Hōki
- Daisen
- Kotoura
- Kurayoshi

Okayama Prefecture

- Maniwa
- Shinjō

== Climate ==
Kōfu is classified as a humid subtropical climate (Köppen Cfa) characterized by warm summers and cold winters with heavy snowfall. The average annual temperature in Kōfu is 11.8 °C. The average annual rainfall is 1883 mm with September as the wettest month. The temperatures are highest on average in August, at around 23.6 °C, and lowest in January, at around 0.1 °C.

== Demography ==
Per Japanese census data, the population of Kōfu has been as follows. The town has been suffering from rural depopulation, and the population has been continuously decreasing since the 1950s.

Historical population
Year	Pop.	±%
1950	7,484	—
1960	7,003	−6.4%
1970	5,538	−20.9%
1980	5,015	−9.4%
1990	4,528	−9.7%
2000	3,921	−13.4%
2010	3,378	−13.8%

== History ==
The area of Kōfu was part of ancient Hōki Province. During the Edo Period, it was part of the holdings of the Ikeda clan of Tottori Domain. Following the Meiji restoration. the village of Ebi was created within Hino District, Tottori on October 1, 1889, with the establishment of the modern municipalities system. Obi was raised to town status on October 1, 1947. The town of Kōfu was formed in 1953 by the merger of Obi, with the villages of Kanagawa and Yonezawa.

== Government ==
Kōfu has a mayor-council form of government with a directly elected mayor and a unicameral town council of 10 members. Kōfu, collectively with the other municipalities of Hino District, contributes one member to the Tottori Prefectural Assembly. In terms of national politics, the town is part of Tottori 2nd district of the lower house of the Diet of Japan.

== Economy ==
The economy of Kōfu is based agriculture, bottled water and seasonal tourism to its ski resorts.

== Education ==
Kōfu has one public combined elementary/middle school operated by the town government. The town does not have a high school.

== Transportation ==
=== Railway ===
JR West - Hakubi Line

- Muko - Ebi

=== Highways ===
- Yonago Expressway
- National Route 180
- National Route 183
- National Route 482

== Local attractions ==
Every August 17, there is a festival held in Kōfu called, "Juushichiya" (十七夜). Yatai (food stalls) of various kinds come and set up shop along the main road in Ebi, and people from all over come to participate in this festival. There is a sumo tournament in the early morning among the men who live in the town, and there is even a tournament for the school children as well. The kindergarten students play Japanese drums, taiko, in the evening along with other members of the town. There are fireworks as well in the evening. A 500-year-old traditional dance is also performed through the town and in the town's park; the dance is called "Kodaiji". The dance has been passed down for 500 years since the death of the lord who ruled over the town, and it is done in remembrance of him and to also wish for a plentiful harvest and successful year. The pinnacle of the festival occurs when townspeople light the hill facing the park on fire, spelling out the festival's name (十七夜) on the side of the hill.

== Noted people from Kōfu ==
- Naomi Wakabayashi, voice actress
