= 2000 Tottori earthquake =

Earthquake in Japan

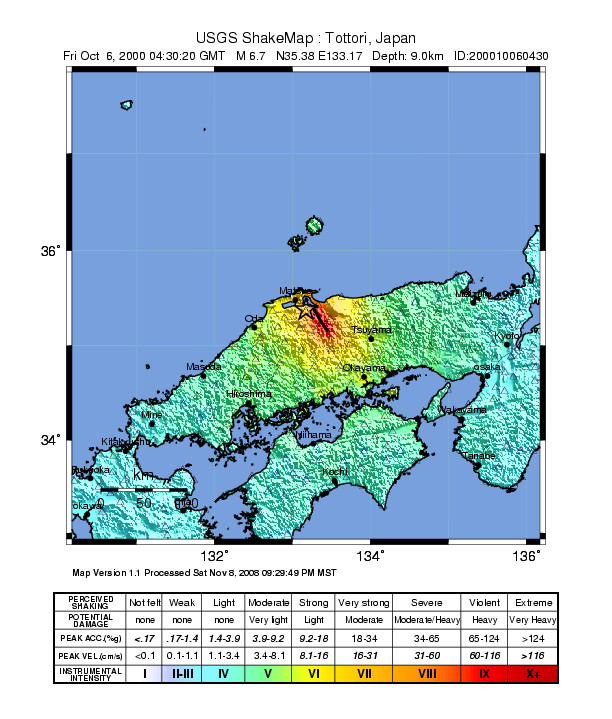
- USGS ShakeMap

- Location within Tottori Prefecture Location within Japan
- UTC time: 2000-10-06 04:30:20
- ISC event: 1839998
- USGS-ANSS: ComCat
- Local date: 6 October 2000
- Local time: 13:30:20 JST (UTC+9)
- Magnitude: 7.3 M_{JMA} 6.7 M_{w}
- Depth: 10 km (6 mi) (USGS); 9 km (6 mi) (JMA)
- Epicenter: 35.27°N 133.31°E
- Type: Strike-slip
- Areas affected: Chūgoku, Shikoku and Kansai regions, Japan
- Total damage: ¥23.63 billion (US$150 million)
- Max. intensity: JMA 6+ (MMI X)
- Peak acceleration: 0.94 g
- Landslides: ≥367
- Casualties: 182 injuries

The 2000 Tottori earthquake (Japanese: 鳥取県西部地震) occurred on 6 October 2000, at 13:30:20 local time with a moment magnitude of 6.7 and a maximum Mercalli intensity of X (Extreme). The epicenter was located in Nambu, near the border with Yasugi, Shimane. About $150 million in damage was caused, with 109,095 homes damaged or destroyed, and at least 182 people were injured.

== Earthquake ==
The United States Geological Survey (USGS) reported a moment magnitude of 6.7 and a focal depth of 10 km (6.2 mi) for the earthquake. The Japan Meteorological Agency recorded a magnitude of M_{JMA} 7.3. This was the first time since the seismic intensity classification was revised in 1996 that a JMA maximum seismic intensity of 6+ or higher was recorded. A USGS seismic installation at Hino recorded 0.9402 g in ground acceleration (pga) and 260.83 cm/s (102.69 in/s) in ground velocity; the station data corresponded to a Modified Mercalli intensity of X (Extreme).

The earthquake was an almost pure left-lateral strike-slip event. It was not caused by the activity of a known fault, but by the activity of an unidentified underground fault. Multiple ground cracks appeared due to underground displacement. The aftershock area was distributed along the source fault of the main shock, from Yasugi City in Shimane Prefecture to Hino District in Tottori Prefecture, extending from south-southeast to north-northwest in a length of approximately 30 km and a depth of approximately 15 km. Prior to the earthquake, swarms of magnitude 5 earthquake activity occurred along the deep extension of the fault in 1989, 1990, and 1997. The earthquake also caused 367 landslides; 348 in Tottori, 18 in Okayama and one in Tokushima.

Locations with a seismic intensity of Shindo 5− and higher
Intensity	Prefecture	Locations
6+	Tottori	Hino, Sakaiminato
6−	Tottori	Yonago, Hiezu, Hōki, Nambu
5+	Shimane	Matsue, Yasugi, Okuizumo
5+	Okayama	Niimi, Maniwa
5+	Kagawa	Tonoshō
5−	Tottori	Daisen, Kotoura, Hokuei, Yurihama, Kurayoshi
5−	Shimane	Izumo, Unnan, Ōda, Gōtsu
5−	Okayama	Okayama, Takahashi, Kibichūō, Tamano, Kurashiki, Kasaoka
5−	Kagawa	Takamatsu, Shōdoshima, Mitoyo, Kanonji, Higashikagawa
5−	Hiroshima	Fukuyama, Shōbara, Ōsakikamijima, Kure, Fuchū
5−	Tokushima	Tokushima
5−	Hyōgo	Awaji

== Impact ==
At least 182 people were injured, 39 of them seriously, due to the earthquake, including 141 in Tottori, 18 in Okayama, 11 in Shimane, four in Osaka, three in Hiroshima, two in Kagawa, and one each in Hyōgo, Wakayama and Yamaguchi. The earthquake completely destroyed 2,158 homes, severely damaged 16,220 and partially damaged 90,717 others, with all structural collapses occurring in Tottori, Okayama and Shimane. Additionally, 6,801 waterways, 700 cultural and educational facilities, 667 roads, 254 public buildings, 91 harbors, 78 rivers, 47 hospitals, 20 bridges, five ships and 2,943 other structures were also affected. Liquefaction was reported in Sakaiminato City and homes were destroyed in Hino, Yonago, and other areas. Damage estimates exceeded ¥23.63 billion (US$150 million).

== See also ==
- List of earthquakes in 2000
- List of earthquakes in Japan
- 2016 Tottori earthquake
