= Saihaku, Tottori =

Dissolved municipality in Tottori prefecture, Japan

Saihaku (西伯町, Saihaku-chō) was a town located in Saihaku District, Tottori Prefecture, Japan.

As of 2003, the town had an estimated population of 8,147 and a density of 98.06 persons per km^{2}. The total area was 83.08 km^{2}.

On October 1, 2004, Saihaku, along with the town of Aimi (also from Saihaku District), was merged to create the town of Nanbu.
