= Nawa, Tottori =

Dissolved municipality in Tottori prefecture, Japan

Nawa (名和町, Nawa-chō) was a town located in Saihaku District, Tottori Prefecture, Japan.

As of 2003, the town had an estimated population of 7,392 and a density of 164.19 persons per km^{2}. The total area was 45.02 km^{2}.

On March 28, 2005, Nawa, along with the town of Nakayama (also from Saihaku District), was merged into the expanded town of Daisen.
