= Aimi, Tottori =

Dissolved municipality in Tottori prefecture, Japan

Aimi (会見町, Aimi-chō) was a town located in Saihaku District, Tottori Prefecture, Japan.

As of 2003, the town had an estimated population of 4,086 and a population density of 132.02 persons per km^{2}. The total area was 30.95 km^{2}.

On October 1, 2004, Aimi, along with the town of Saihaku (also from Saihaku District), was merged to create the town of Nanbu.
