= Hōki Province =

Former province of Japan

Map of Japanese provinces (1868) with Hoki Province highlighted

Hōki Province (伯耆国, Hōki no Kuni; Japanese pronunciation: [hó̞ò̞.k̟ʲì (nò̞ kɯ̈̀.ɲ̟ì)]) was a former province in the area that is today the western half of Tottori Prefecture in the San'in region of Japan. Hōki was bordered by Inaba, Mimasaka, Izumo, Bitchū, and Bingo Provinces. Its abbreviated form name was Hakushū (伯州). In terms of the Gokishichidō system, Hōki was one of the provinces of the San'indo circuit. Under the Engishiki classification system, Hōki was ranked as one of the 35 "superior countries" (上国) in terms of importance, and one of the "middle countries" (中国) in terms of distance from the capital. The provincial capital was located in what is now the city of Kurayoshi, Tottori. The ichinomiya of the province is the Shitori Shrine also located in the town of Yurihama. As there are many cultural and historic similarities between Hōki and neighboring Izumo Provinces, the two provinces are sometimes informally grouped together as the Unpaku region (雲伯地方). Conversely, Mount Daisen forms a geographic divide, which separates Hōki culturally and historically into eastern Tōhaku (東伯) and Saihaku (西伯) regions.

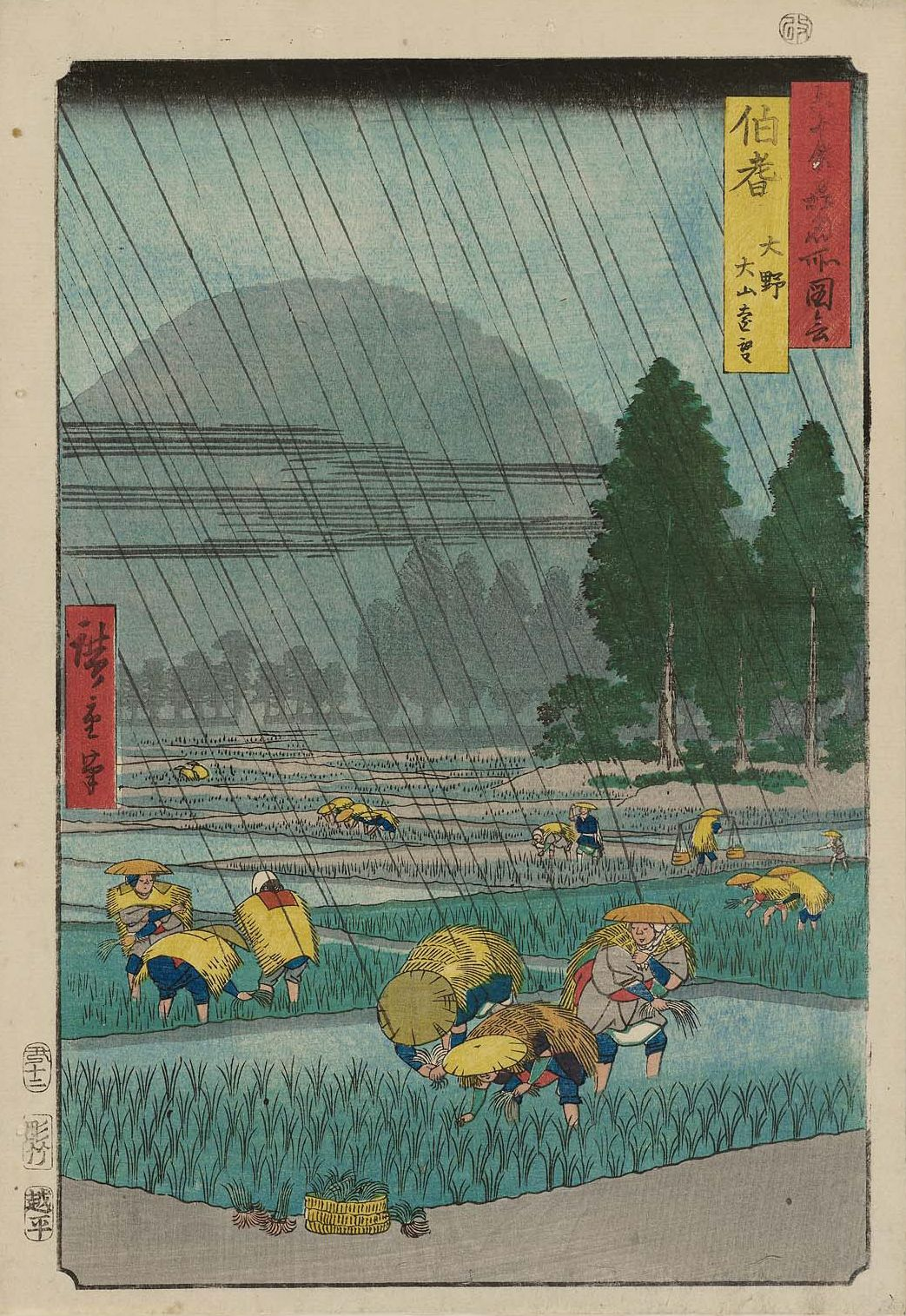
Hiroshige ukiyo-e "Hōki" in "The Famous Scenes of the Sixty States" (六十余州名所図会), depicting Mount Daisen

== History ==
From before the Kofun period, the area of Hōki was part of the Izumo cultural area, including the production of iron and the forging of swords. According to the "Hōki Fudoki", the hydra monster Yamata no Orochi pursued Princess Inada into the mountains of Hōki, where she called out for her mother to save her. Her cries of "Hahakimase" became shortened to "hahaki" and eventually "Hōki". The ancient Kojiki states that the burial place of the creator kami, Izanami was located on the border of Izumo with Hōki. During the late Kofun period to Asuka period, Hōki was gradually incorporated into Yamato rule. At the end of the Kamakura period, exiled Emperor Go-Daigo escaped from his prison on the Oki Islands and made Hōki his initial base of operations against the Kamakura shogunate. During the Muromachi period, the Yamana clan were nominally shugo of the province; however, their control over the province was very weak, and local warlords and aggressive neighbors often usurped Yamana authority. In the Sengoku period, the province was a contested area between the Amago clan. Mōri clan and Oda Nobunaga, with Nobunaga's general, Hashiba Hideyoshi eventually seizing control. In the Edo period, the entire province was ruled by a branch of the Ikeda clan as part of the 320,000 koku Tottori Domain centered on Tottori Castle in neighboring Inaba Province, although the important temple and pilgrimage center of Daisen-ji remained independent.

Following the Meiji restoration and the abolition of the han system in 1871, Hōki became part of Tottori Prefecture on August 29,1871. However, Tottori was merged into Shimane Prefecture on August 21, 1876. It was separated back out on September 12, 1881. However, the name of province continued to exist for some time afterwards for legal purposes. For example, Hōki is explicitly recognized in treaties in 1894 (a) between Japan and the United States and (b) between Japan and the United Kingdom.

Per the early Meiji period Kyudaka kyuryo Torishirabe-chō (旧高旧領取調帳), an official government assessment of the nation’s resources, the province had 778 villages with a total kokudaka of 245,034 koku.

Bakumatsu period domains
| Name | Clan | Type | kokudaka |
|---|---|---|---|
| Tottori | Ikeda clan | Shinpan equivalent | 320,000 koku |

Districts of Hōki Province
| District | kokudaka | Villages | Currently | Notes |
|---|---|---|---|---|
| Kawamura District (河村郡) | 28,645 koku | 108 villages | Misasa, Yurihama | merged with Kume and Yabase Districts to become Tōhaku District (東伯郡) on March 29, 1896 |
| Kume District (久米郡) | 46,044 koku | 120 villages | Kurayoshi, Hokuei | merged with Kawamura and Yabase Districts to become Tōhaku District on March 29, 1896 |
| Yabase District (八橋郡) | 35,482 koku | 108 villages | Kotoura, Hokuei | merged with Kawamura and Kume Districts to become Tōhaku District on March 29, 1896 |
| Aseri District (汗入郡) | 27,900 koku | 75 villages | Daisen | merged with Aimi District to become Saihaku District on March 29, 1896 |
| Aimi District (会見郡) | 70,839 koku | 185 villages | Sakaiminato, Yonago, Nanbu | merged with Aseri District to become Saihaku District (西伯郡) on March 29, 1896 |
| Hino District (日野郡) | 36,121 koku | 182 villages | Hino, Nichinan, Kōfu, Hōki | |

== Gallery ==
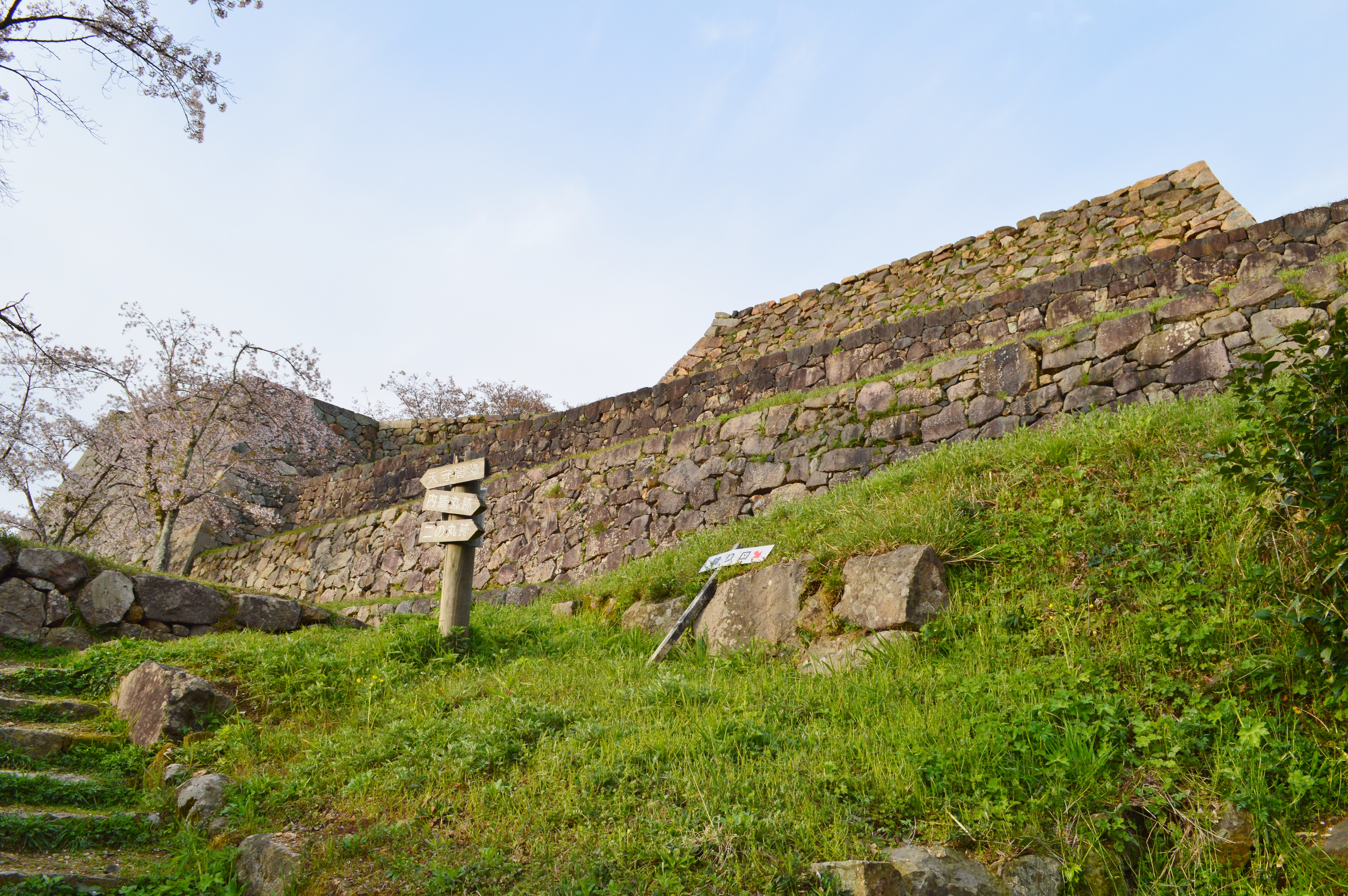
ruins of Yonago Castle

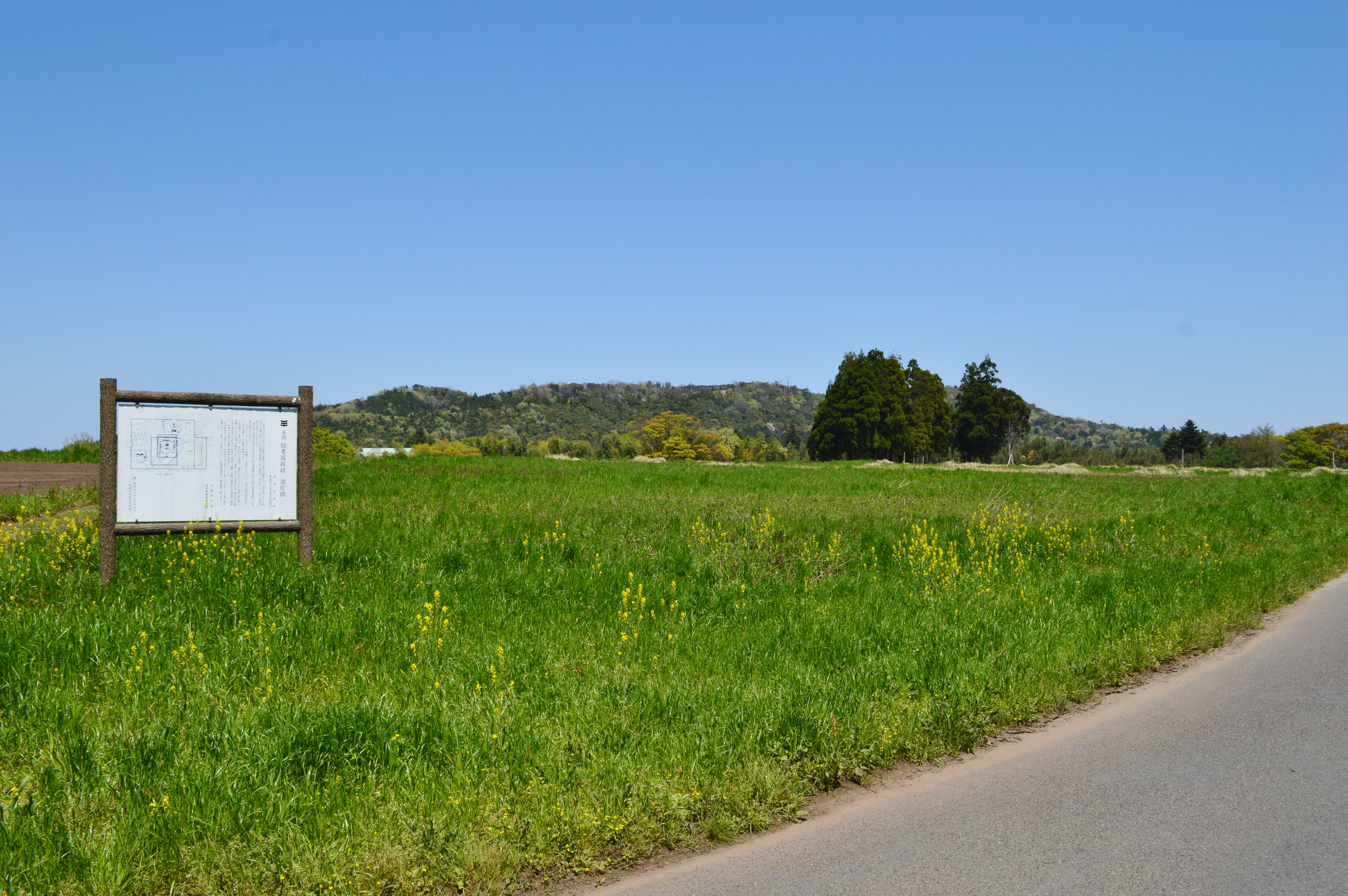
Hōki Kokufu ruins

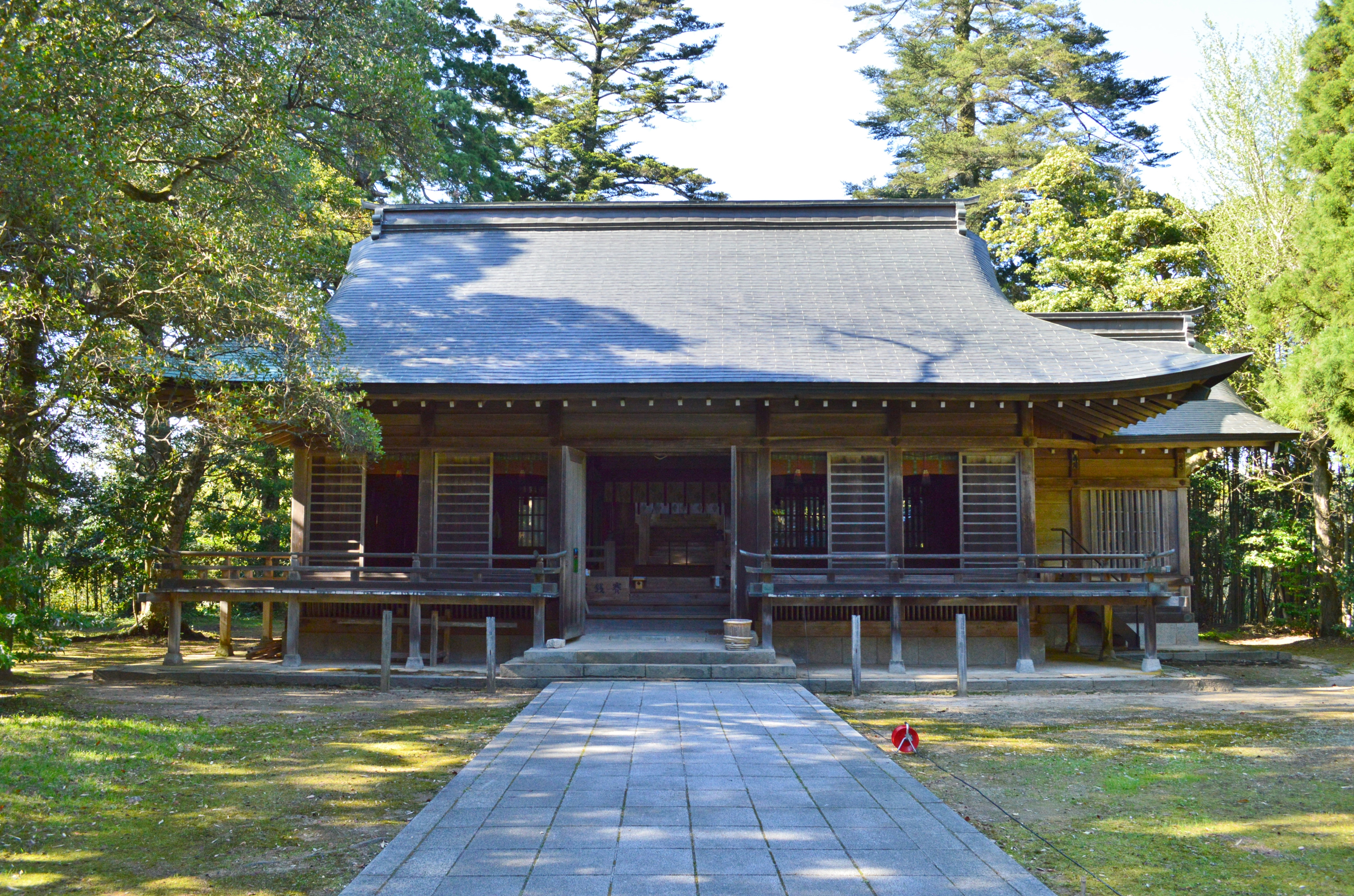
Shitori Shrine, ichinomiya of Hōki Province
