= Nakayama, Tottori =

Dissolved municipality in Tottori prefecture, Japan

Nakayama (中山町, Nakayama-chō) was a town located in Saihaku District, Tottori Prefecture, Japan.

As of 2003, the town had an estimated population of 5,095 and a density of 84.47 persons per km^{2}. The total area was 60.32 km^{2}.

On March 28, 2005, Nakayama, along with the town of Nawa (also from Saihaku District), was merged into the expanded town of Daisen.

Nakayama was known for Taikyu Temple, built in 1357, and for its local hot spring. It also had a well-known hiking path, as well as a golf course and river fishing. During the first week of October, the town holds an annual bicycle race. On May 4, the day before "Children's Day," men and boys dress in samurai clothes and hold a display of ancient guns and archery.

Nakayama was a sister city of Temecula, California.
