= Muko Station =

Railway station in Kōfu, Tottori Prefecture, Japan

Muko Station 武庫駅
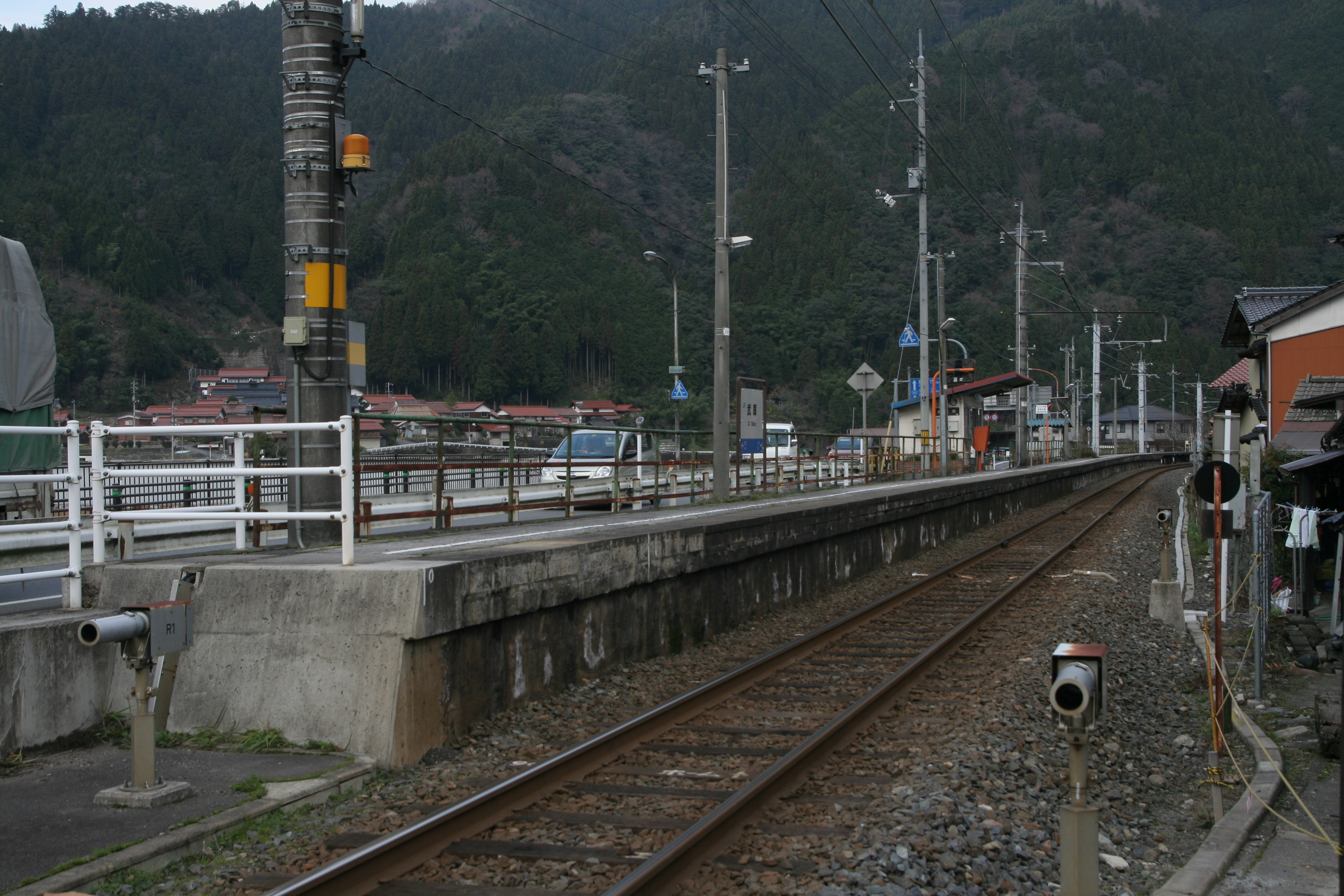
- Neu Station, December 2009

General information
- Location: Muko, Kōfu-cho, Hino-gun, Tottori-ken 689-4411; Japan
- Coordinates: 35°16′2.63″N 133°28′36.60″E
- Operator: JR West
- Line: Hakubi Line
- Distance: 116.0 km (72.1 miles) from Kurashiki
- Platforms: 1 side platform
- Tracks: 1

Construction
- Structure type: At grade

Other information
- Status: Unstaffed
- Website: Official website

History
- Opened: 23 August 1961

Passengers
- 2018: 43 daily
Location
- Location within Tottori Prefecture Location within Japan

Muko Station (武庫駅, Muko-eki) is a passenger railway station located in the town of Kōfu, Tottori Prefecture, Japan. It is operated by the West Japan Railway Company (JR West).

== Lines ==
Muko Station is served by the Hakubi Line, and is located 116.0 kilometers from the terminus of the line at Kurashiki and 131.9 kilometers from Okayama.

== Station layout ==
The station consists of one ground-level side platform serving single bi-directional track. There is no station building and the station is unattended.

== Adjacent stations ==
| « | Service | » |
Hakubi Line
| Neu | - | Ebi |

== History ==
Muko Station opened on August 23, 1961. With the privatization of the Japan National Railways (JNR) on April 1, 1987, the station came under the aegis of the West Japan Railway Company.

== Passenger statistics ==
In fiscal 2018, the station was used by an average of 43 passengers daily.

== Surrounding area ==
- Japan National Route 181

== See also ==
- List of railway stations in Japan
