= Daisen-ji =

Buddhist temple in Tottori Prefecture, Japan

Coordinates: 35°23′27.57″N 133°32′5.59″E

- 大山寺
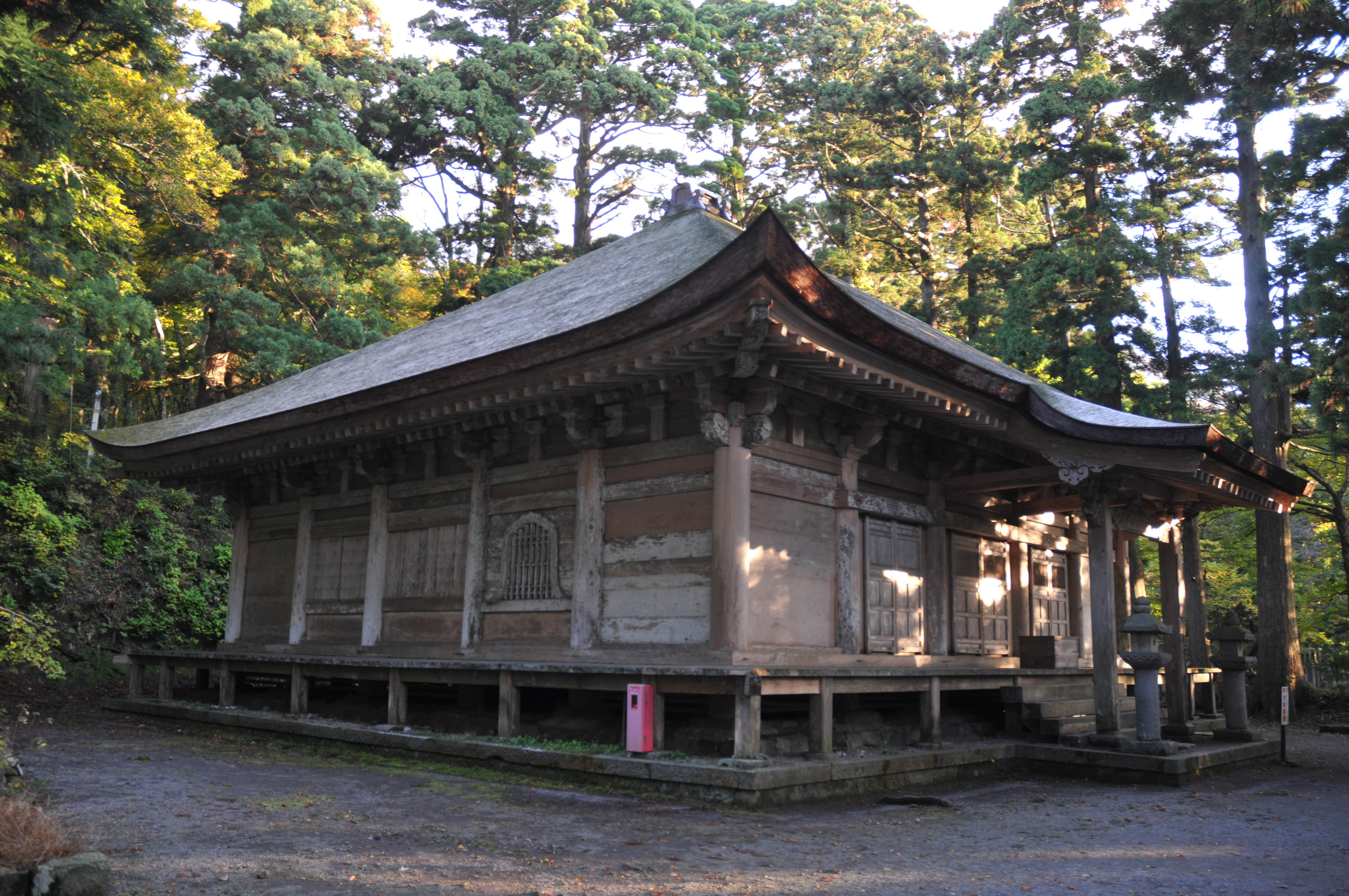
- Amida-dō of Daisen-ji, Important Cultural Property of Japan

- Location within Tottori Prefecture Location within Japan

Religion
- Affiliation: Buddhist
- Deity: Jizo Bosatsu
- Rite: Tendai
- Status: functional

Location
- Location: 9 Daisen, Daisen-cho, Saihaku-gun, Tottori-ken 689-3318, Japan
- Country: Japan
- Interactive map of Daisen-ji

Architecture
- Completed: c.718

Website
- Official website
- National Historic Site of Japan

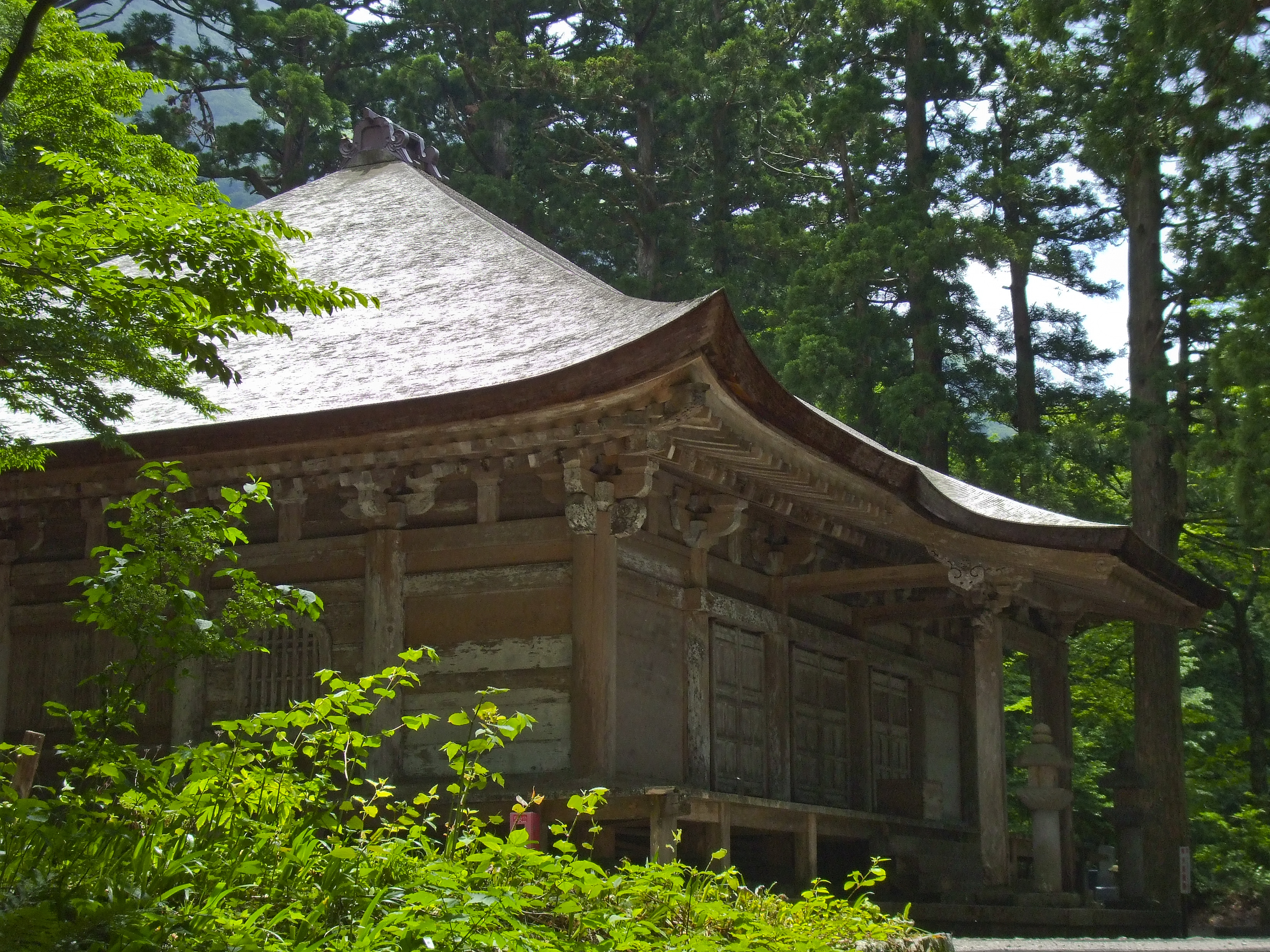
Amida-do, An Important Cultural Property

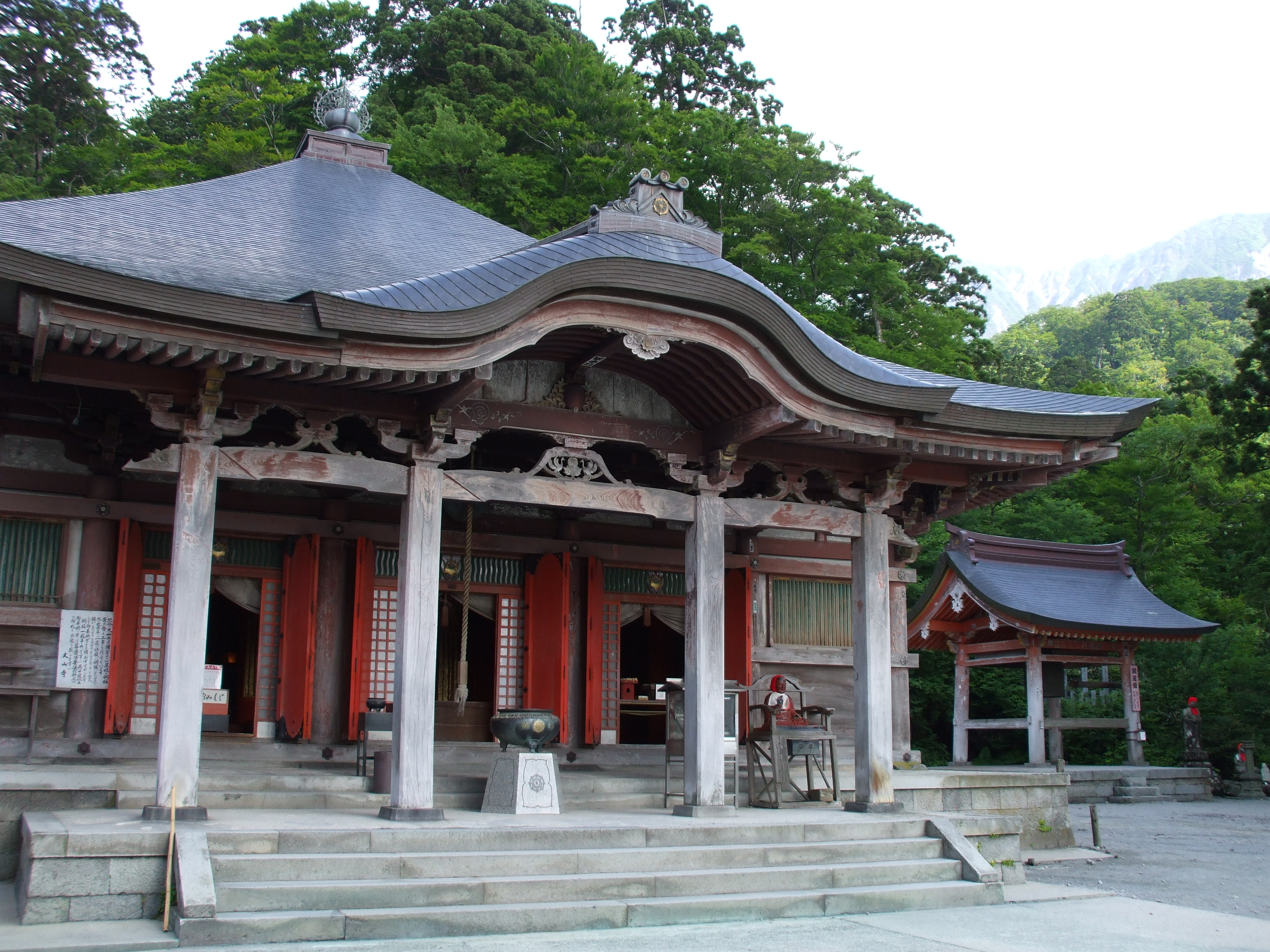
Main Hall

Daisen-ji (大山寺) is a Buddhist temple located in the town of Daisen, Tottori Prefecture, Japan. It belongs to the Tendai sect of Japanese Buddhism, and its honzon is a statue of Jizo Bosatsu. The temple is built on the slopes of Daisen. The Amida-dō and other parts of the temple are designated National Important Cultural Properties. The temple precincts are protected as a National Historic Site

== History ==
=== Early history ===
Mount Daisen, from early times, was considered a sacred mountain by practitioners of Koshintō, an early form of the Shinto religion. By the 7th century the area became a center of shugendō, a syncretic religion which incorporated aspects Koshintō, Japanese folk animism and shamanism, Taoism and esoteric Buddhism of the Shingon Mikkyō and the Tendai sects. The details of the temple's foundation is unknown, but according to temple legend, the kuni no miyatsuko of Hōki Province, named "Toshikata" shot a deer with his bow on the slopes of the sacred mountain. Repenting for his act, he became a priest and took the name of Koren Shonin in 718 AD, and constructed a small hut to worship Jizo Bosatsu.

After the 9th century, this temple came under the control of the Tendai sect and grew to become one of the most important of its centers in the Chugoku region. The head monk, or Zashu, of this temple was dispatched from Enryaku-ji, the headquarters of Tendai sect, and after serving a term here, returned to Mount Hiei and was promoted. Pilgrimage routes to the temple developed to the southern coast from the late Heian period and the temple was protected by local warlords such as the Amago clan and the Mōri clan in the Sengoku period. under the Tokugawa shogunate in the Edo period, the temple controlled estates with a kokudaka of 3000 koku and was independent of Tottori Domain, which controlled the remainder of Hōki Province.

=== Modern history ===
Daisen-ji was greatly affected by the anti-Buddhist haibutsu kishaku movement (1868-c.1874) after the Meiji Restoration in 1868. Daisen-ji was closed in 1875. The Daichimyōkogen hall became the Ōgamiyama Shrine, and the Shinto-related assets of Daisen-ji were removed and transferred to the shrine. Daisen-ji was allowed to reopen in 1903. In 1928 the Dainichi-dō was destroyed by fire. Numerous cultural treasures were lost in the fire, notably the Daisen-ji engi emaki, the illustrated scrolls of the history of the temple. The Dainichi-dō was reconstructed in 1951.

== Cultural Properties ==
=== Important Cultural Properties ===
- Amida-do (阿弥陀堂), thatched, 5x5 bay single story wooden structure, constructed in 1552.
- Wooden Amida Nyorai and attendant statues (木造阿弥陀如来及び両脇侍像), Heian period, inscribed with date of 1131.
- Bronze Standing Statue of Juichiman Kannon (銅造十一面観音立像), Nara period.
- Iron Altar (鉄製厨子), Nara period.

=== Registered Tangible Cultural Properties ===
- Hondo-do (本堂), 5x6 bay single story wooden structure, constructed in 1951.
- Shōrō (鐘楼), 1x1 bay single story wooden structure, constructed in 1950.

== See also ==
- List of Historic Sites of Japan (Tottori)
