= Yonago Expressway =

Expressway in Okayama and Tottori prefecture, Japan

Yonago Expressway
- 米子自動車道

Route information
- Length: 66.5 km (41.3 mi)
- Existed: 1989–present

Major junctions
- From: Ochiai Junction in Maniwa, Okayama; Chūgoku Expressway
- To: Yonago Interchange in Yonago, Tottori; San'in Expressway

Location
- Country: Japan
- Major cities: Hōki

Highway system
- National highways of Japan; Expressways of Japan

The Yonago Expressway (米子自動車道, Yonago Jidōsha-dō) is a national expressway in the Chūgoku region of Japan. It is owned and operated by West Nippon Expressway Company.

== Overview ==
The expressway is officially referred to as the Chūgoku-Ōdan Expressway Okayama Yonago Route.

The route connects the city of Yonago with the Chūgoku Expressway in Okayama Prefecture. From the terminus at Yonago Interchange, there are plans to extend the route northward to the terminus of the city of Sakaiminato.

The first section of the expressway was opened to traffic in 1989 and the entire route was completed in 1992. The route was originally 2 lanes only, one in each direction. However expansion to two lanes in each direction has proceeded gradually over the years. Expansion of the southern half (between Ochiai Junction and Hiruzen Interchange) was completed in 2011.

== List of interchanges and features ==
- IC - interchange, SIC - smart interchange, JCT - junction, SA - service area, PA - parking area, BS - bus stop, TN - tunnel, BR - bridge

No.	Name	Connections	Dist. from Origin	Bus Stop	Notes	Location	
(15)	Ochiai JCT	Chūgoku Expressway	0.0			Maniwa	Okayama
1	Kuse IC	National Route 181	3.2	○		Maniwa	Okayama
PA	Ueno PA		7.2			Maniwa	Okayama
TN	Suribachiyama Tunnel				northbound: 4,090 m (13,420 ft) southbound: 4,100 m (13,500 ft)	Maniwa	Okayama
2	Yuhara IC	National Route 313; Hōjō Yubara Road (planned)	15.6	◆	Bus stop closed	Maniwa	Okayama
TN	Tamadayama Tunnel				northbound: 1,655 m (5,430 ft) southbound: 1,630 m (5,350 ft)	Maniwa	Okayama
BS	Futagawa BS		24.0	◆	Bus stop closed	Maniwa	Okayama
SA	Hiruzen-kōgen SA		32.5			Maniwa	Okayama
3	Hiruzen IC	National Route 482	33.5			Maniwa	Okayama
TN	Mihirayama Tunnel				Length - 1,529 m (5,016 ft)	Maniwa	Okayama
TN	Mihirayama Tunnel				Length - 1,529 m (5,016 ft)	Kōfu	Tottori
TN	Miyaichi Tunnel				northbound: 340 m (1,120 ft) southbound: 370 m (1,210 ft)	Kōfu	Tottori
4	Kōfu IC	National Route 181; National Route 183; National Route 482; Kōfu Miyoshi Road (planned)	48.9	○		Kōfu	Tottori
TN	Neubara Tunnel				Length - 720 m (2,360 ft)	Hōki	Tottori
5	Mizoguchi IC	Tottori Prefectural Route 45	57.2	○		Hōki	Tottori
5-1	Daisen PA; Daisen-kōgen SIC	Tottori Prefectural Route 326	61.7	○		Hōki	Tottori
TB	Yonago TB		66.1			Yonago	Tottori
6 (16)	Yonago IC/JCT	San'in Expressway; National Route 431	66.5		JCT:Northbound exit only IC:Southbound entrance only	Yonago	Tottori
Through to Sakaiminato (planned)
