= Hino District, Tottori =

District in Tottori prefecture, Japan

Coordinates: 35°09′18″N 133°17′35″E

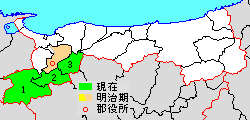
Location of Hino District in Tottori Prefecture

Hino (日野郡, Hino-gun) is a district located in Tottori Prefecture, Japan.

As of 2025, the district has an estimated population of 8,369 and a density of 14 persons per km^{2}. The total area is 599.46 square kilometres (231.45 mi^{2}).

== History ==
Hino District has been settled since ancient times. The area is especially rich in remains from the late Kofun period (250 – 538) AD. Hino District belonged to Hōki Province, a former old province of Japan that covered the western part of present-day Tottori Prefecture. The district is described in the Izumo Fudoki, a detailed 8th-century record of the culture and geography of Izumo Province. The Wamyō Ruijushō, a 10th-century Japanese dictionary, records that the district consisted of six villages by the time of the Heian period (794 – 1185). From the middle of the Kamakura period to the end of the Nanboku-chō period, from roughly the 13th to 14th centuries, the district was controlled by the Hino and Kamonamochi clans.

Various clans took control of the district in the Sengoku period (1467 – 1573), but the area was ultimately unified under the Ikeda clan, who ruled from Tottori Castle in present-day Tottori City. At the beginning of the Edo period (1603 – 1868) the district had 173 villages; by the end of the period, they numbered 165. Hino District was noted for the production of iron, steel, and tobacco in the Edo period. In 1858 Hino was separated into two districts, but records from the period indicate the borders of the area were, in general, poorly defined. Under the administrative reforms of the Meiji period (1868 – 1912) Hino District was re-established, and in 1889 consisted of 29 villages. Through various mergers the district now consists of only three municipalities.

== Geography ==
Hino District stretches from roughly Mount Sentsū to the upper and middle reaches of the Hino River. The small plains in the valleys around the Hino River have been developed for rice production.

== Merger ==
- On January 1, 2005 the town of Mizokuchi merged with the town of Kishimoto, from Saihaku District, to form the new town of Hōki, in Saihaku District.

== Towns and villages ==
- Hino
- Kōfu
- Nichinan
