= Mount Daisen =

Stratovolcano on the island of Honshu in Japan

- 大山
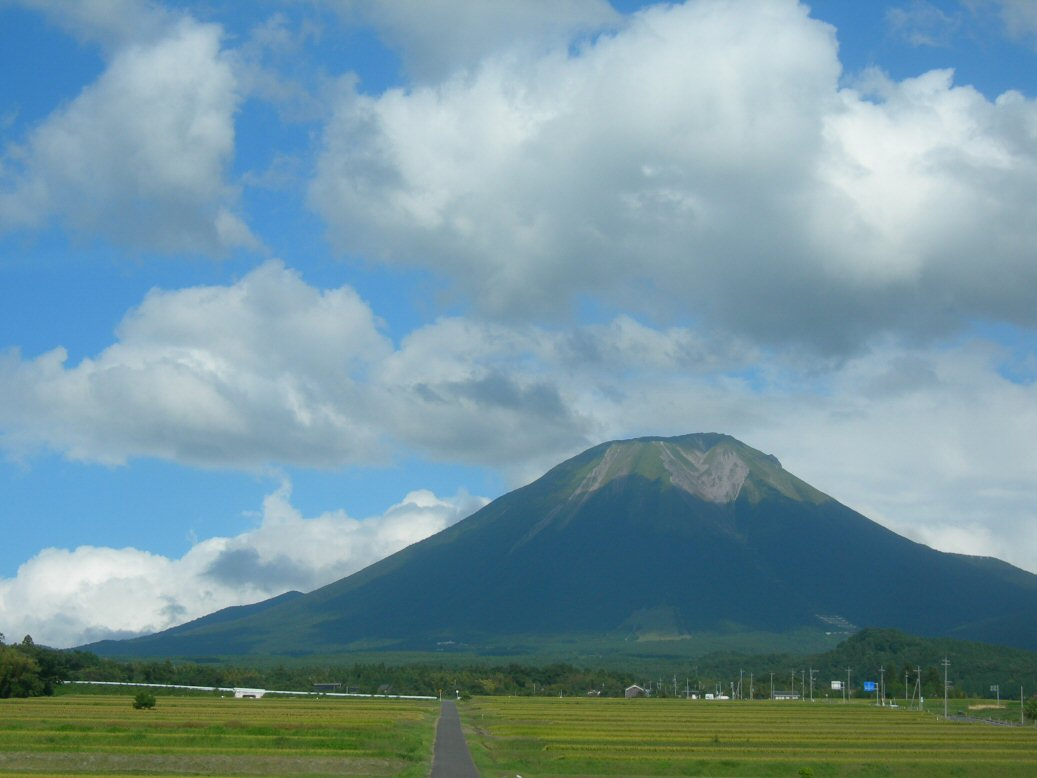
- Mount Daisen from the West

Highest point
- Elevation: 1,729 m (5,673 ft)
- Prominence: 1,634 m (5,361 ft)
- Listing: Ultra, Ribu; List of mountains and hills of Japan by height
- Coordinates: 35°22′16″N 133°32′47″E

Naming
- English translation: Big Mountain
- Language of name: Japanese
- Pronunciation: Japanese: [daiseɴ]

Geography
- Location within Japan
- Location: Tottori Prefecture, Japan
- Parent range: Chūgoku Mountains

Geology
- Mountain type: Complex volcano
- Last eruption: Estimated 17,000-18,000 years ago

Climbing
- Easiest route: Hiking

Mount Daisen (大山, Daisen) is a dormant stratovolcano in Tottori Prefecture, Japan. It has an elevation of 1,729 m (5,673 ft). This mountain is the highest in the Chūgoku region, and the most important volcano on the Daisen volcanic belt, which is a part of the Southwestern Honshu volcanic arc, where the Philippine Sea Plate is subducting under the Amurian Plate.

== Outline ==
Mount Daisen is a complex volcano, made by repeated volcanic activity over thousands of years. Eruptions in this area started 1.8 million years ago and resulted in Old Daisen some 500,000 years ago. The Mount Daisen of today, New Daisen, resulted from a second group of eruptions which started 50,000 years ago and ended 10,000 years ago in the caldera of Old Daisen. 50,000 years ago, this mountain had a plinian eruption from which volcanic ash can be found as far away as the Tohoku Region of Japan. Daisen is one of the 100 famous mountains in Japan, and also one of the Chūgoku 100 mountains.

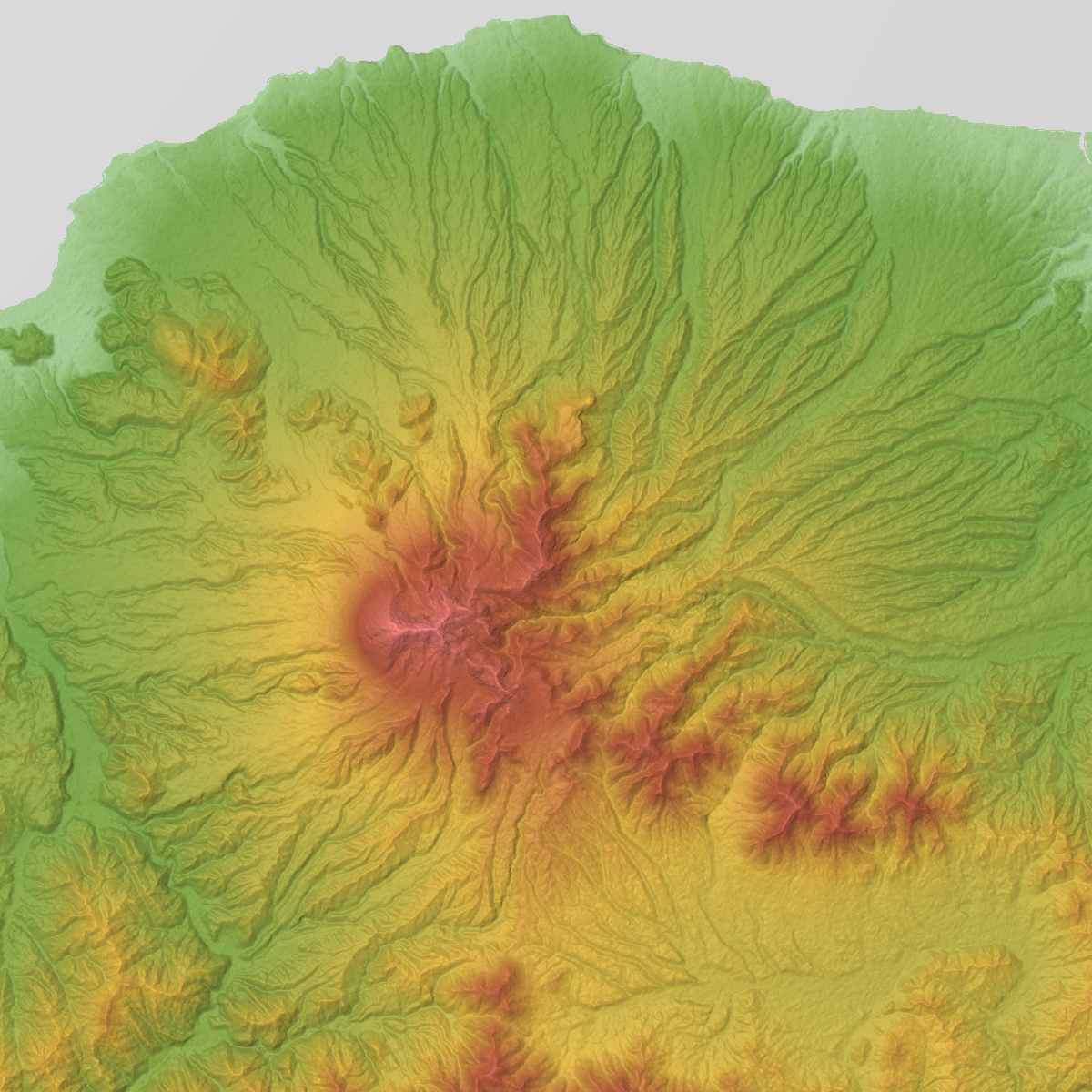
Relief Map

== History and religion ==
Mount Daisen, which stands directly on the Sea of Japan, was regarded as one of the most important mountains for Japanese Shugendō religion. According to the Izumo Kokudo Fudoki, completed in 733, it was called Ōgami-take, literally, Mountain of the great god. This and Ōgami-yama (whence the name of Ōgamiyama Jinja) represent the older, native Japanese name for the mountain, while Daisen is the Chinese-based go-on reading of 大山, literally, great mountain.

Mount Daisen has been called Hōki Fuji and Izumo Fuji, depending on which side of the mountain the viewer is standing on. These names are based on the old Hōki and Izumo provinces.

Halfway up the mountain stands a Buddhist temple, Daisen-ji. This has existed as a centre of worship since the Heian period. It was founded by the Tendai sect in 718.

Climbing the mountain used to be severely prohibited without a selected monk of Daisen-ji, and common people could not access the mountain until the Edo period.

The mountain has also been important to the mountain ascetics of the Shugendō sect. Just above the temple is the Ōgamiyama Jinja, literally, shrine of the mountain of the great god.

== Route ==
After the 2000 Tottori earthquake, some of Mount Daisen's peaks are on the verge of collapse. It is prohibited to ascend the mountain's highest peak, the Kengamine (1,729 metres (5,673 ft)). Climbers are able to access the Misen Peak (1,709.4 metres (5,608 ft)). The most popular route is from Daisen-ji to the Misen Peak. It takes three hours to reach the summit.

== Gallery ==
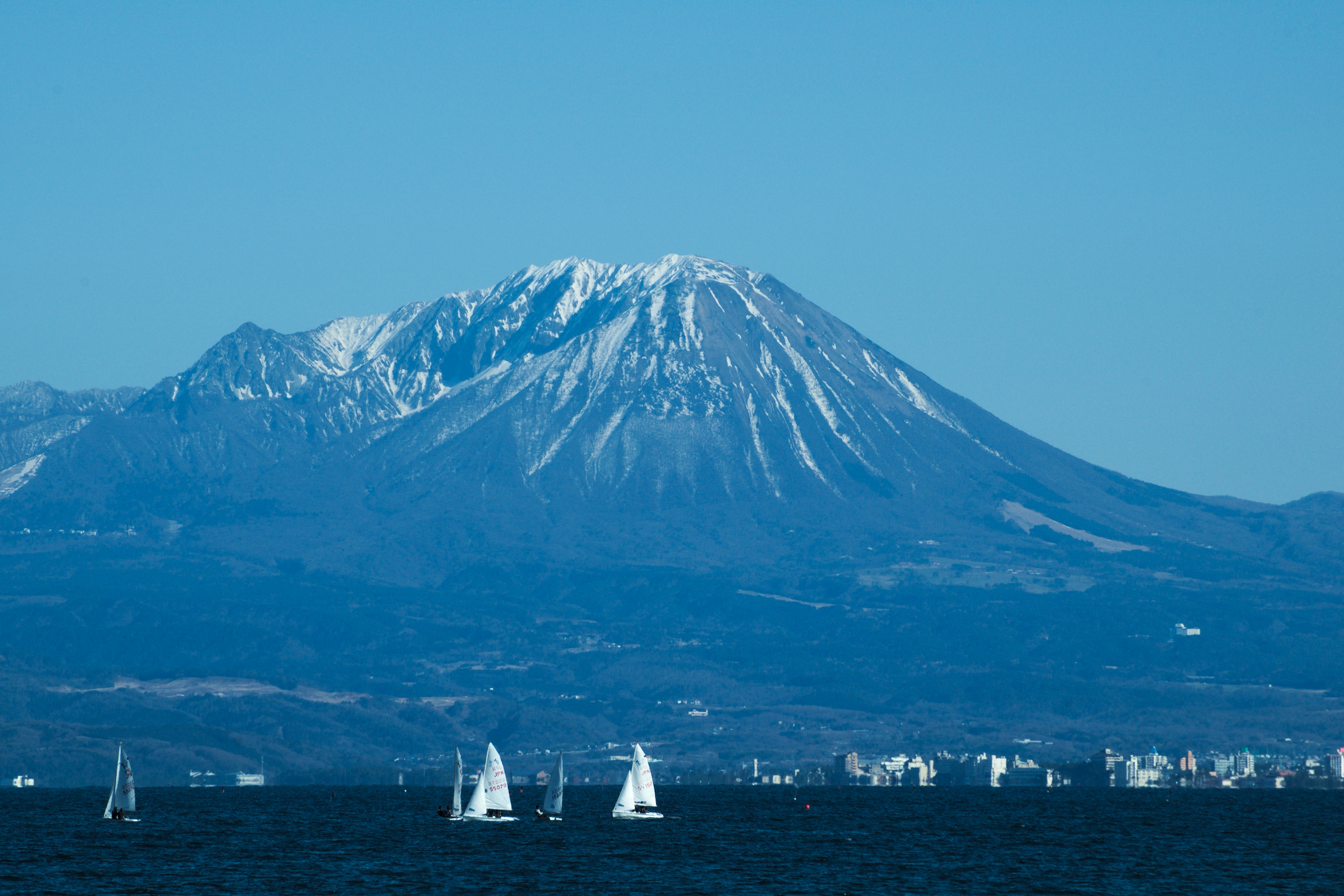
NW side

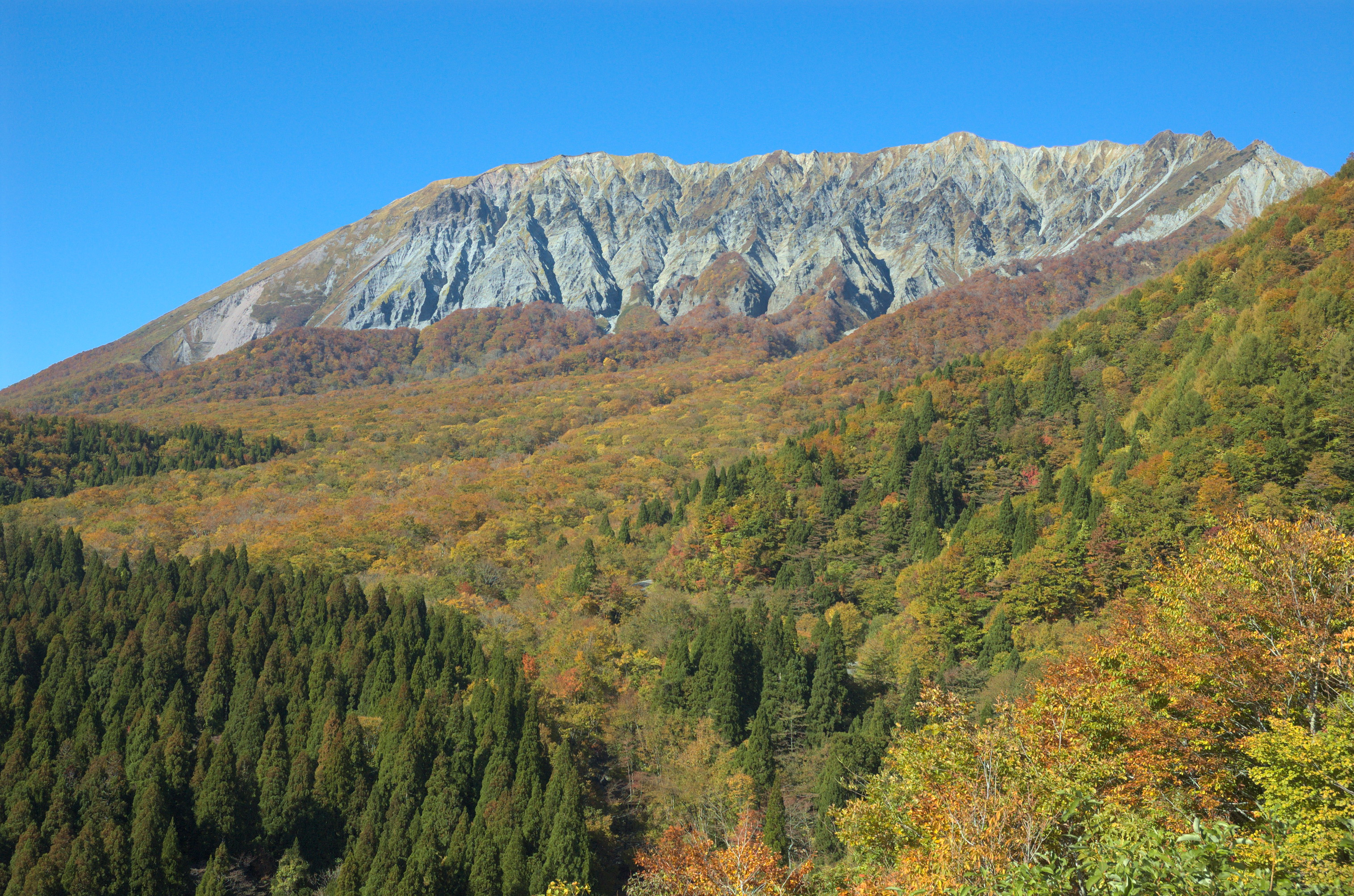
South wall

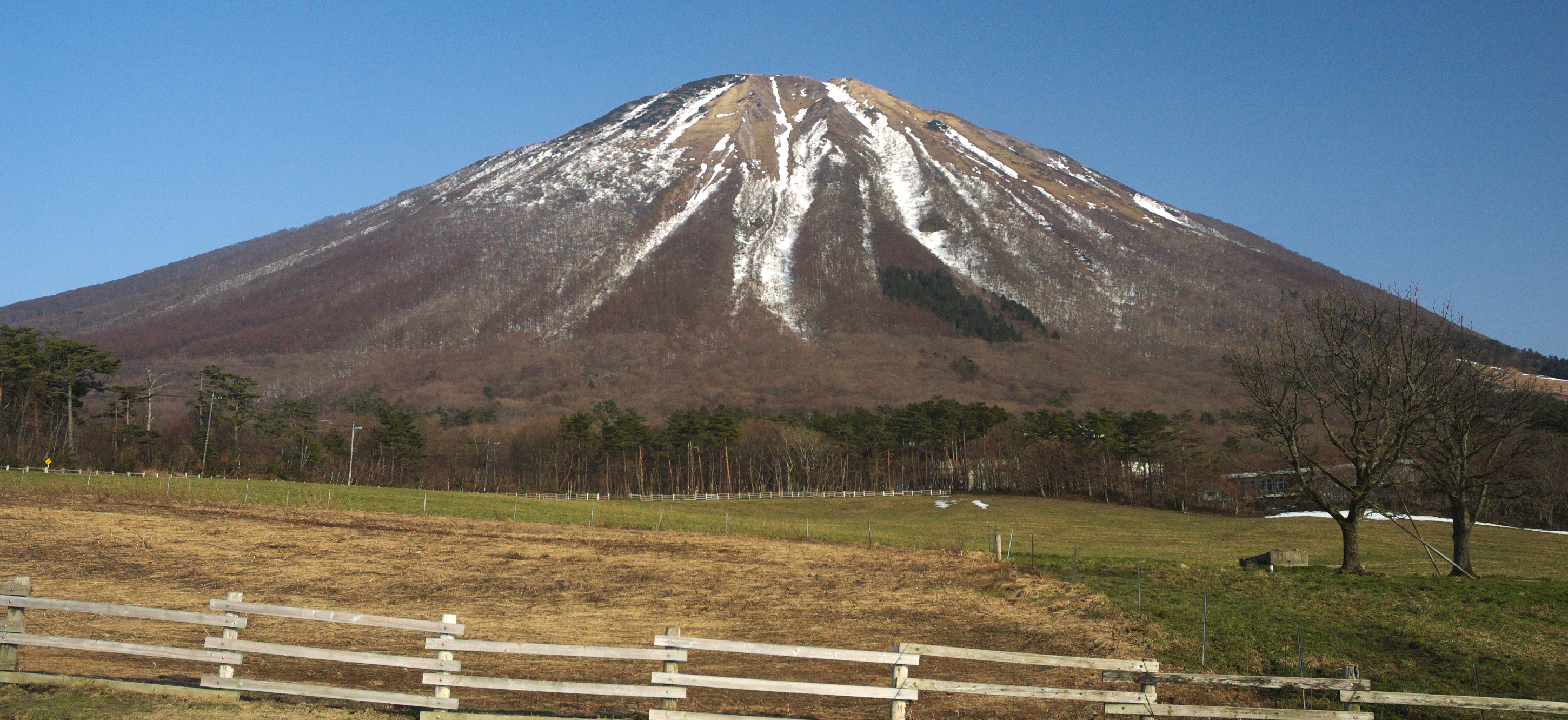
WNW side

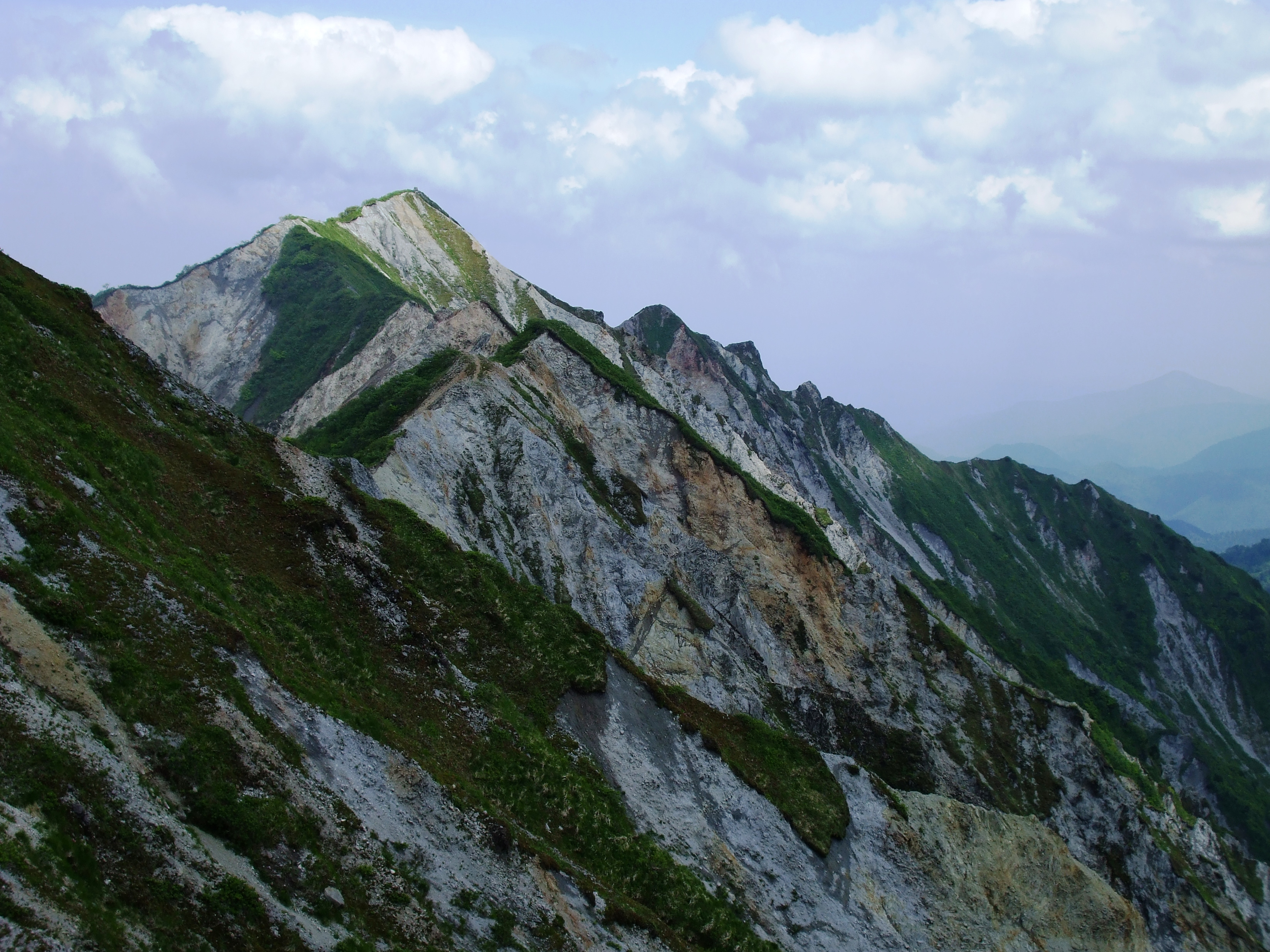
Kengamine Peak, the highest peak of Mount Daisen

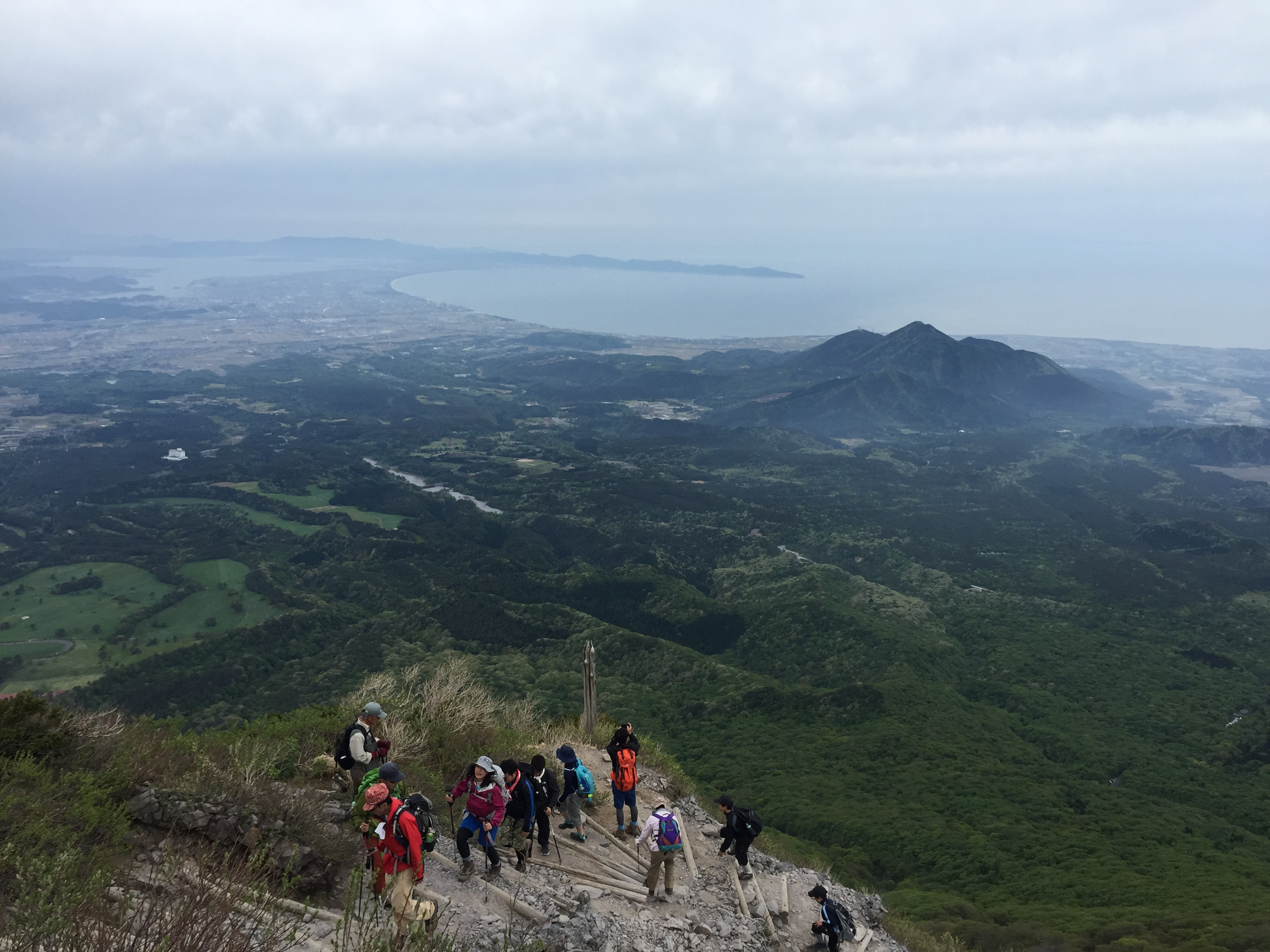
Looking NW

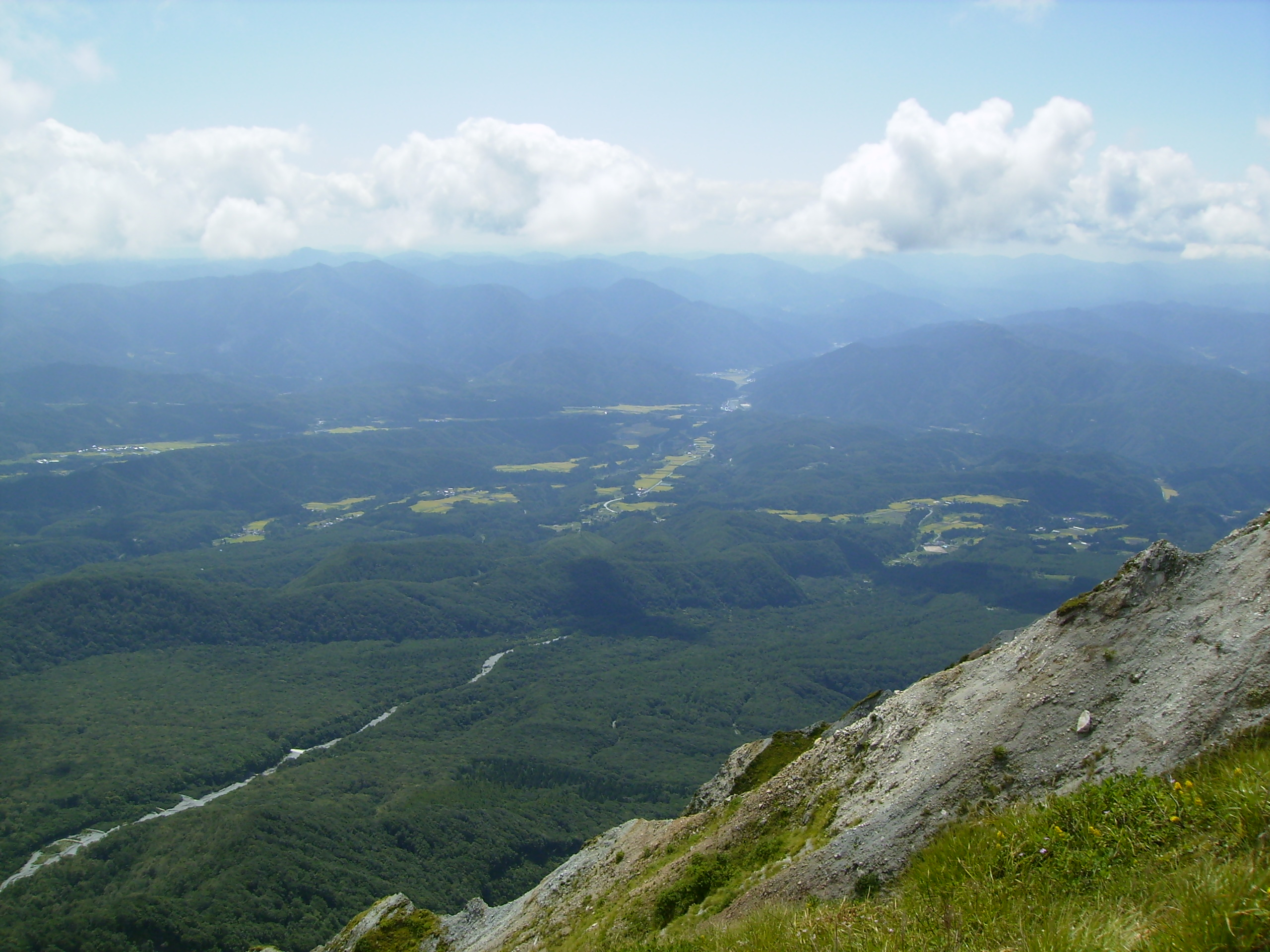
Looking SSW

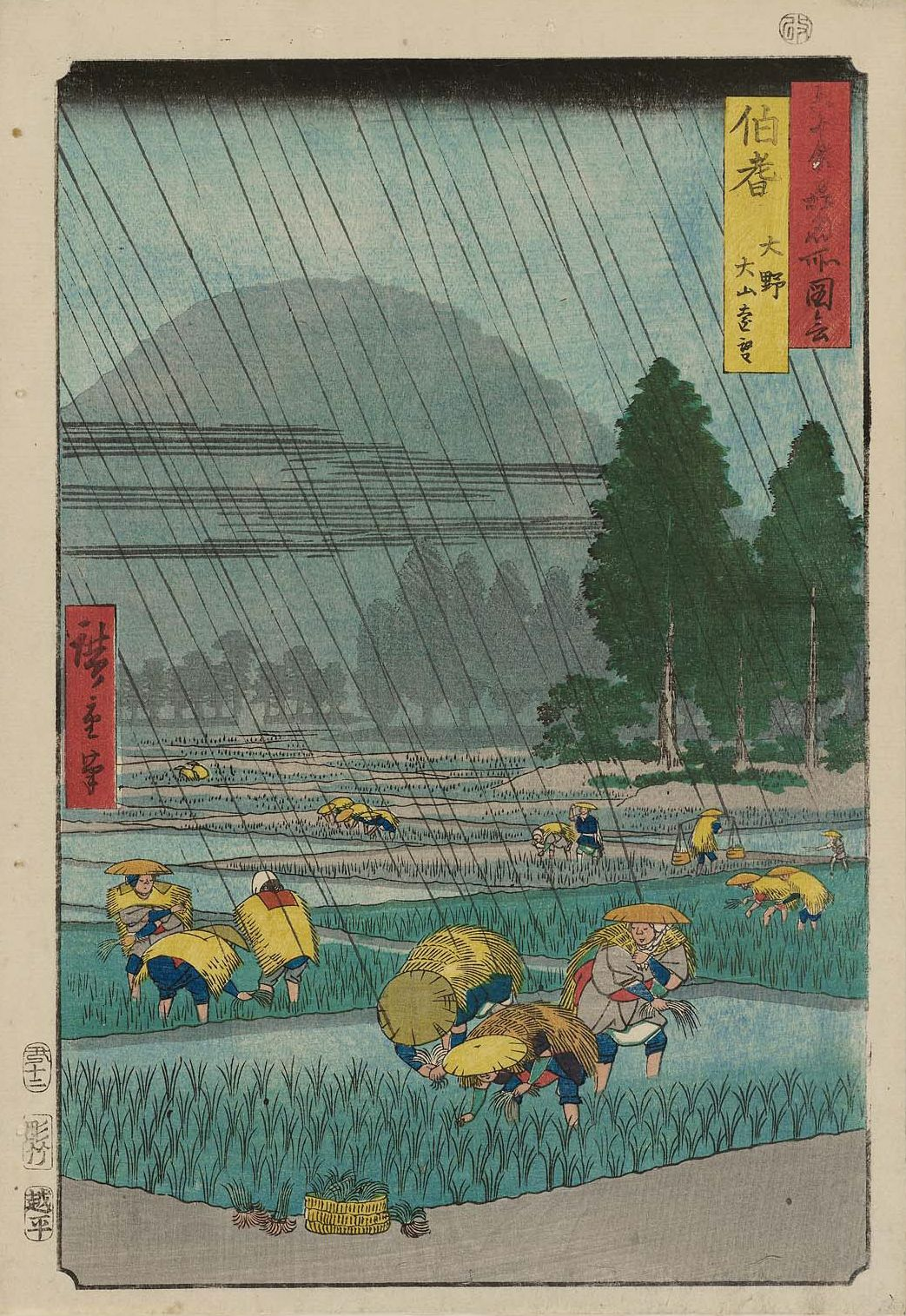
Hiroshige

== See also ==
- List of mountains in Japan
- List of volcanoes in Japan
- List of Ultras of Japan
