= Kishimoto, Tottori =

Town in Saihaku, Tottori, Japan

Kishimoto (岸本町, Kishimoto-chō) was a town in Saihaku District, Tottori Prefecture, Japan.

As of 2003, the town had an estimated population of 7,152 and a density of 183.15 persons per km^{2}. The total area was 39.05 km^{2} (15.08 sq mi).

On January 1, 2005, Kishimoto, along with the town of Mizokuchi (from Hino District), was merged to create the town of Hōki (in Saihaku District).
