= Saihaku District, Tottori =

District in Tottori prefecture, Japan

Coordinates: 35°21′47″N 133°25′48″E

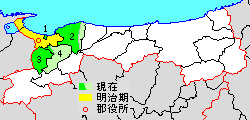
Location of Saihaku District in Tottori Prefecture

Saihaku (西伯郡, Saihaku-gun) is a district located in Tottori Prefecture, Japan.

== Population ==
As of 2003, the district has an estimated population of 50,436 and a density of 135.28 persons per km^{2}. The total area is 372.83 km^{2}.

== Towns and villages ==
- Daisen
- Hiezu
- Hōki
- Nanbu

== Mergers ==
- On October 1, 2004 the towns of Saihaku and Aimi merged to form the new town of Nanbu.
- On January 1, 2005 the town of Kishimoto merged with the town of Mizokuchi from Hino District to form the new town of Hōki in Saihaku District.
- On March 28, 2005 the towns of Nakayama and Nawa merged into the town of Daisen.
- On March 31, 2005 the town of Yodoe merged into the city of Yonago.
