= 2016 Tottori earthquake =

Earthquake in Japan

- 鳥取県中部地震
- Location within Tottori Prefecture
- UTC time: 2016-10-21 05:07
- ISC event: 611830857
- USGS-ANSS: ComCat
- Local date: October 21, 2016
- Local time: 14:07 (JST)
- Magnitude: M_{JMA} 6.6 M_{w} 6.2
- Depth: 11 km
- Epicenter: 35.380°N 133.855°E
- Max. intensity: MMI VIII (Severe) JMA 6−
- Peak acceleration: 1.52 g 1494 Gal
- Casualties: 32 injured

The 2016 Tottori earthquake (鳥取県中部地震, Tottori-ken Chūbu Jishin) is an earthquake that occurred in central Tottori Prefecture in Japan on October 21, 2016. It measured 6.2 on the moment magnitude scale. The earthquake left 32 people injured.

== Earthquake ==
The shock had a maximum intensity of VIII (Severe), and it had a maximum JMA intensity of Shindo 6− (Kurayoshi, Yurihama and Hokuei).

== See also ==
- List of earthquakes in 2016
- List of earthquakes in Japan
- 2000 Tottori earthquake
