= Nanbu, Tottori =

Nanbu 南部町
- Town
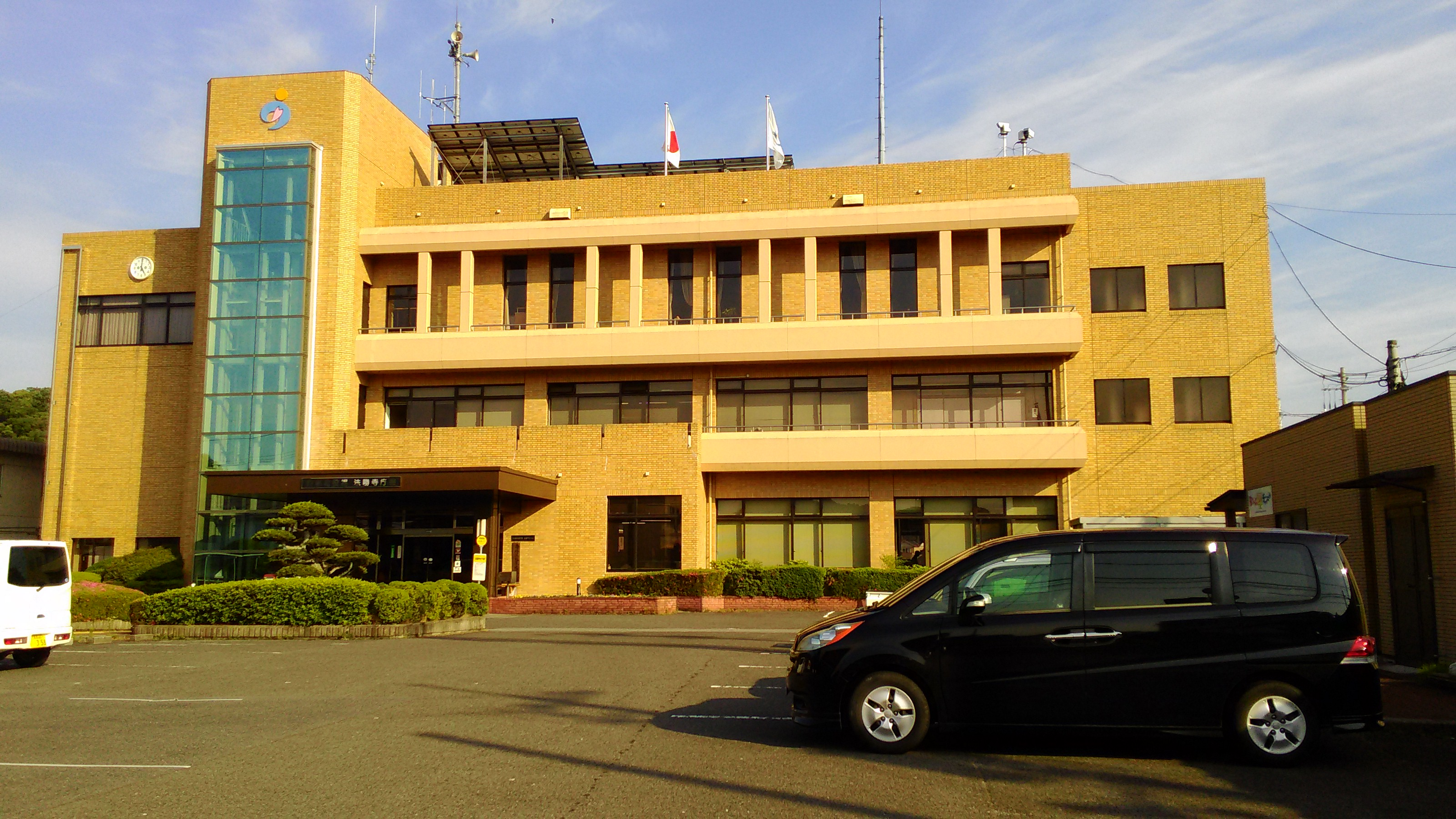
- Nanbu Town Office

- Flag Seal
- Location of Nanbu in Tottori Prefecture

- Location in Japan
- Coordinates: 35°20′N 133°20′E
- Country: Japan
- Region: Chūgoku; San'in
- Prefecture: Tottori
- District: Saihaku

Area
  - Total: 114.03 km^{2} (44.03 sq mi)

Population (December 31, 2022)
  - Total: 10,348
  - Density: 90.748/km^{2} (235.04/sq mi)
- Time zone: UTC+09:00 (JST)
- City hall address: 377-1 Hoshoji, Nanbu-cho, Saihaku-gun, Tottori-ken 683-0351
- Website: Official website

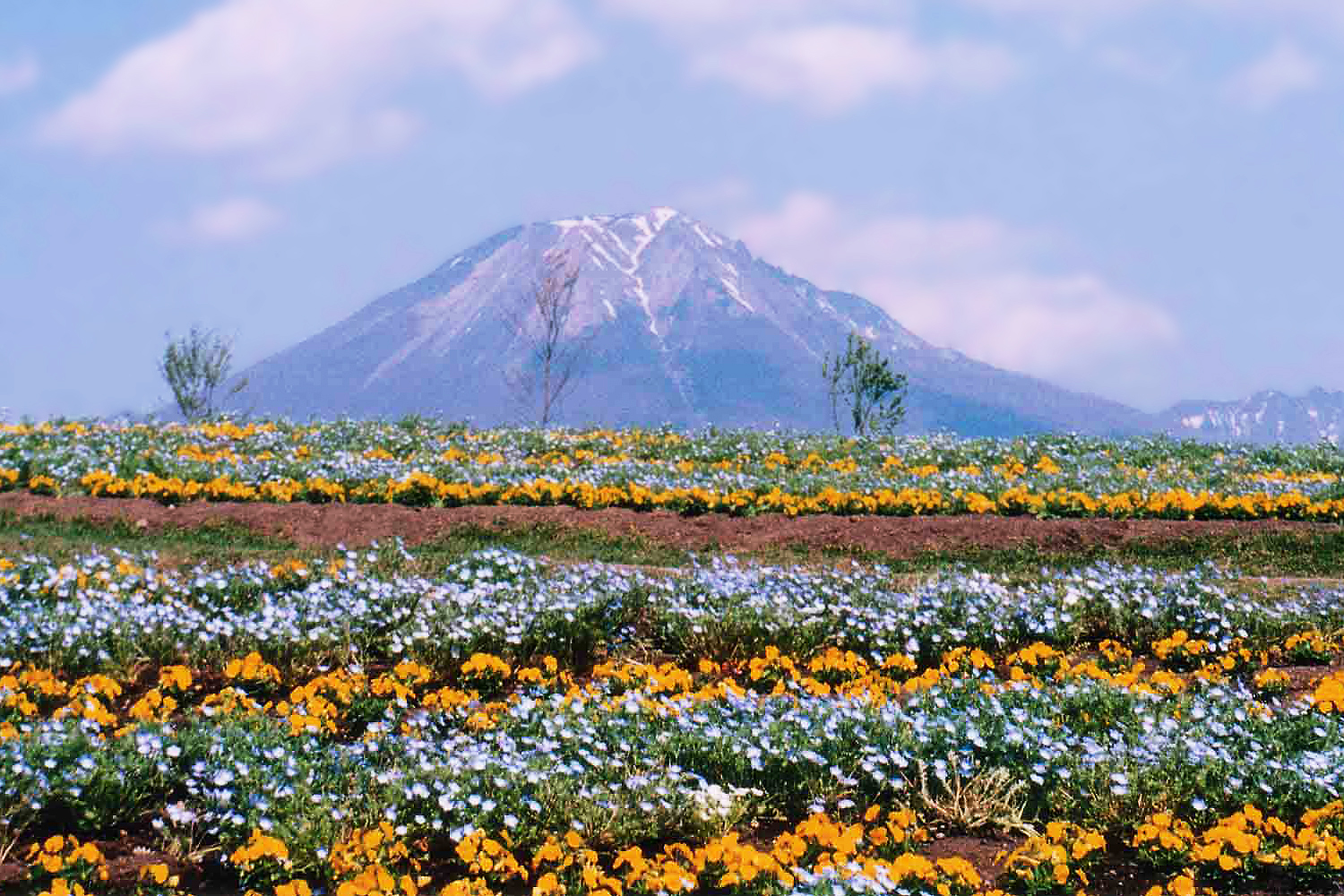
Mount Daisen in spring from Nanbu

Nanbu (南部町, Nanbu-chō) is a town located in Saihaku District, Tottori Prefecture, Japan. As of 31 December 2021, the town had an estimated population of 10,348 in 3894 households and a population density of 91 persons per km^{2}. The total area of the town is 114.03 square kilometres (44.03 mi^{2}).

== Geography ==
Nanbu is located in the Chūgoku Mountains in western Tottori Prefecture and borders Shimane Prefecture to the west.

== Neighboring municipalities ==
Tottori Prefecture

- Yonago
- Hōki
- Hino
- Nichinan

Shimane Prefecture

- Yasugi

== Climate ==
Nanbu is classified as a humid subtropical climate (Köppen Cfa) characterized by warm summers and cold winters with heavy snowfall. The average annual temperature in Nanbu is 13.5 °C. The average annual rainfall is 1770 mm with September as the wettest month. The temperatures are highest on average in August, at around 25.26 °C, and lowest in January, at around 2.2 °C.

== Demography ==
Per Japanese census data, the population of Nanbu has been as follows.

Historical population
Year	Pop.	±%
1950	13,787	—
1960	12,926	−6.2%
1970	11,108	−14.1%
1980	12,472	+12.3%
1990	12,774	+2.4%
2000	12,210	−4.4%
2010	11,543	−5.5%

== History ==
The area of Nanbu was part of ancient Hōki Province. During the Edo Period, it was part of the holdings of the Ikeda clan of Tottori Domain. Following the Meiji restoration. the area was organized into villages within Saihaku District on October 1, 1889, with the establishment of the modern municipalities system. Nanbu was founded on October 1, 2004, from the merger of the towns of Saihaku and Aimi, both from Saihaku District.

== Government ==
Nanbu has a mayor-council form of government with a directly elected mayor and a unicameral town council of 14 members. Nanbu, collectively with the other municipalities of Saihaku District, contributes three members to the Tottori Prefectural Assembly. In terms of national politics, the town is part of Tottori 2nd district of the lower house of the Diet of Japan.

== Economy ==
The economy of Nanbu is based agriculture.

== Education ==
Nanbu has three public elementary schools and two public junior high schools operated by the town government. The town does not have a high school.

== Transportation ==
=== Railway ===
Nanbu is not served by any passenger rail service. The closest train station is Yonago Station in Yonago, served by the JR West San'in Main Line and JR West Sakai Line.

=== Highways ===
- National Route 180

== Local attractions ==
Nanbu is home to Tottori Hanakairo-Flower Park (とっとり花回廊, Tottori Hanakairō), Japan's largest floral theme park. It features extensive gardens, multi-lingual guide pamphlets, and a large indoor orchid cultivation area.
