= Hoki (surname) =

Hoki (written: 保木) is a Japanese surname. Notable people with the surname include:

- Takuro Hoki (保木 卓朗; born 1995), Japanese badminton player
