= Mizokuchi, Tottori =

Dissolved municipality in Tottori prefecture, Japan

Mizokuchi (溝口町, Mizokuchi-chō)

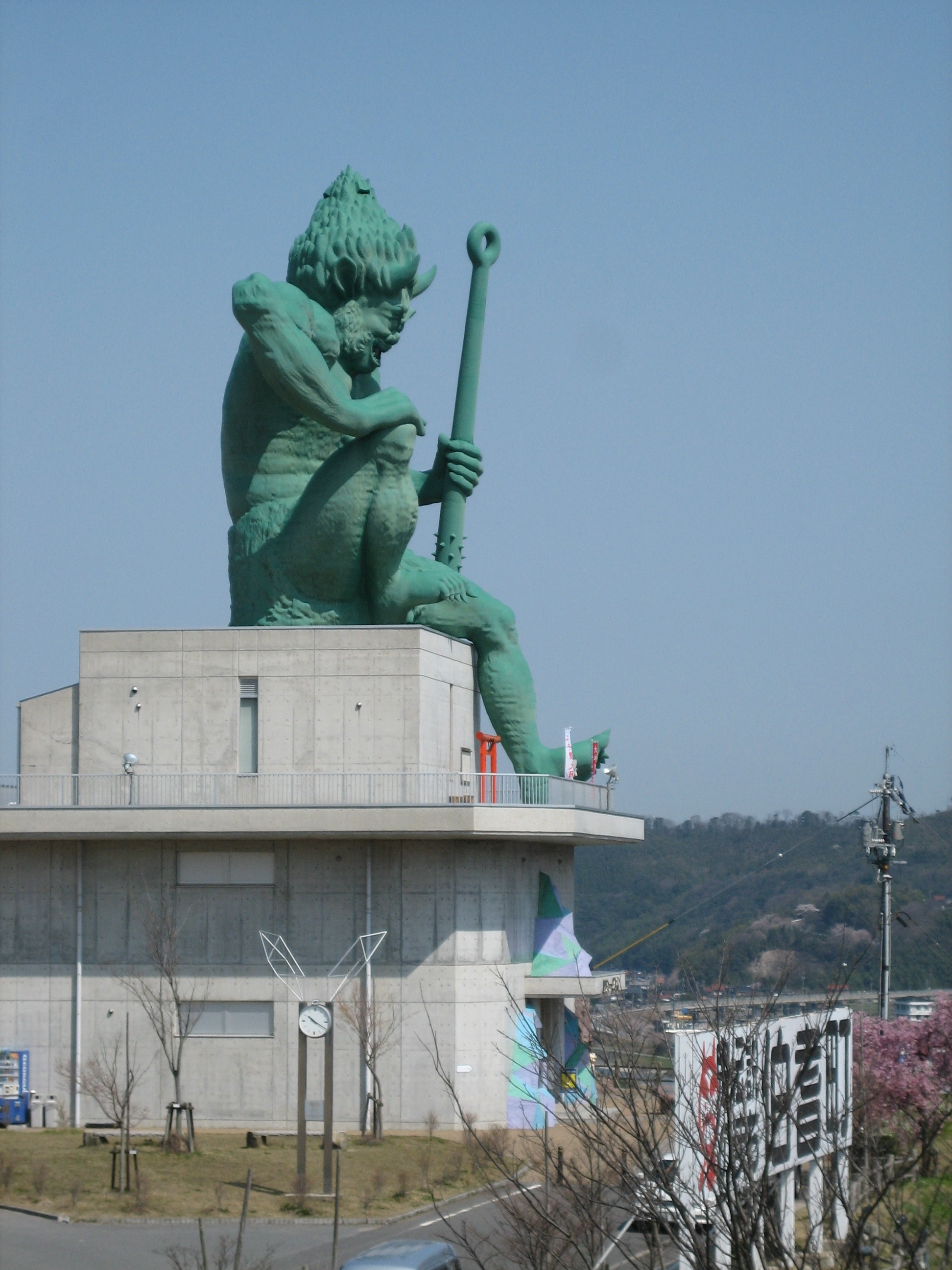
A view of public building in Hoki, Japan.

was a town located in Hino District, Tottori Prefecture, Japan.

As of 2003, the town had an estimated population of 5,309 and a density of 52.88 persons per km^{2}. The total area was 100.40 km^{2} (38.76 sq mi).

On January 1, 2005, Mizokuchi, along with the town of Kishimoto (from Saihaku District), was merged to create the town of Hōki (in Saihaku District).

Prior to the merger, an oni statue (which still stands in Hōki today) was built to serve as Mizokuchi's town mascot.
