= Hōki, Tottori =

Hōki 伯耆町
- Town
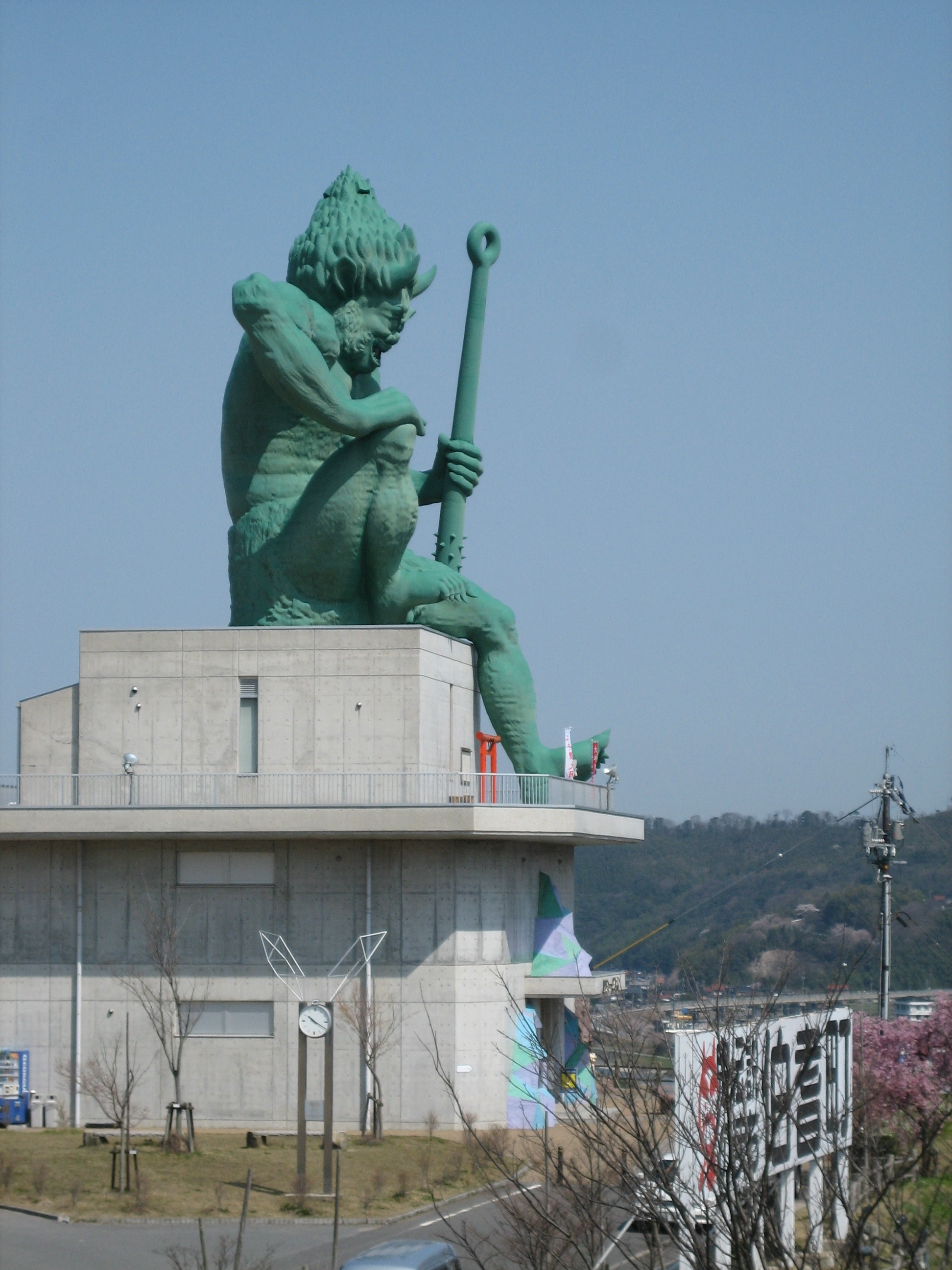
- Large statue of an oni, Hōki, Tottori Prefecture

- Flag Seal
- Interactive map of Hōki
- Coordinates: 35°23′8″N 133°24′26″E
- Country: Japan
- Region: Chūgoku; San'in
- Prefecture: Tottori
- District: Saihaku

Area
  - Total: 139.44 km^{2} (53.84 sq mi)

Population (January 1, 2023)
  - Total: 10,420
  - Density: 74.73/km^{2} (193.5/sq mi)
- Time zone: UTC+9 (Japan Standard Time)
- Tree: Japanese yew
- Flower: Broccolini flower
- Phone number: 0859-68-3111
- Address: 3-37 Yoshinaga, Hōki-chō, Saihaku-gun, Tottori-ken 689-4133
- Website: Official website (in Japanese)

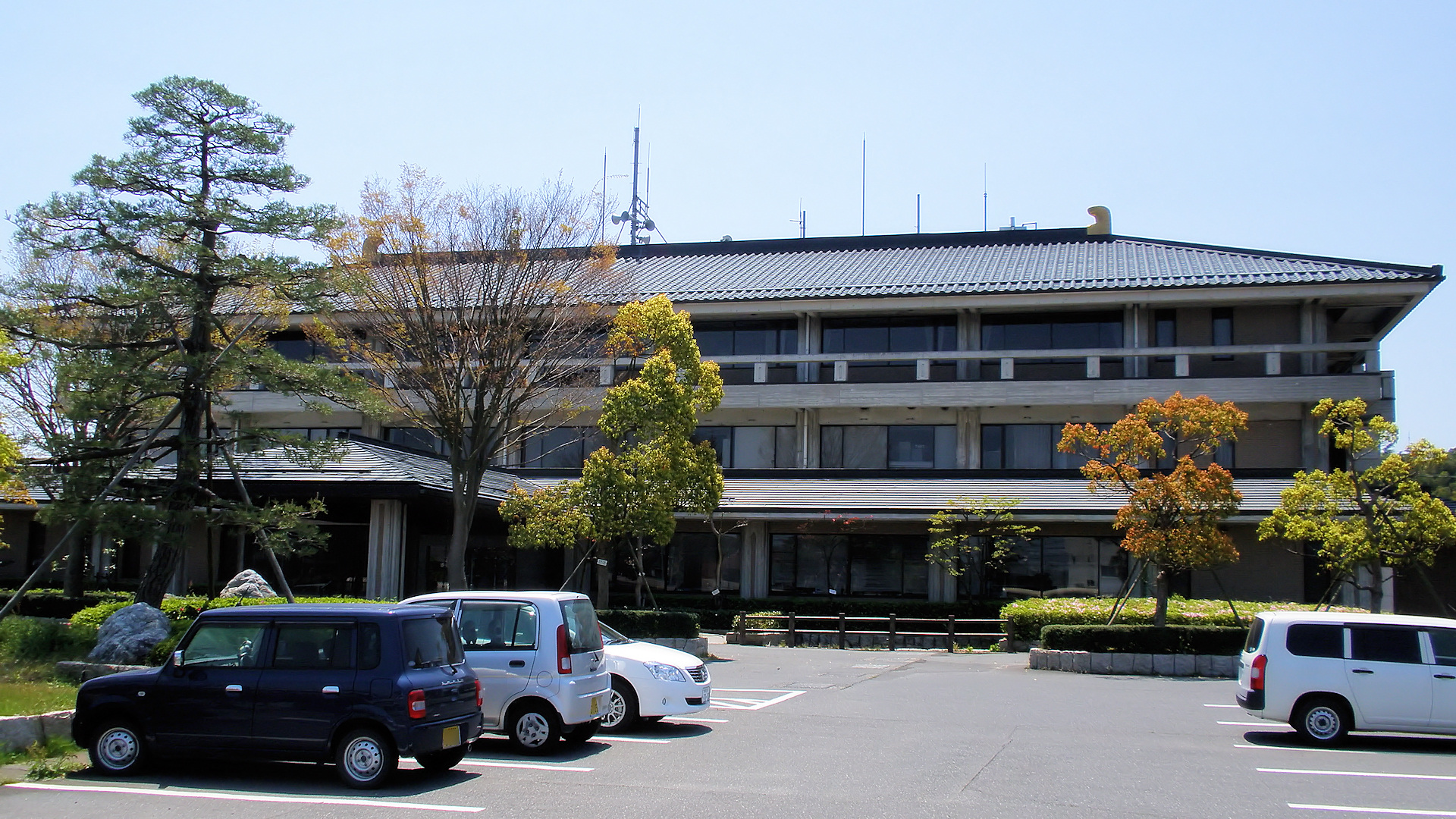
Hōki town hall

Hōki (伯耆町, Hōki-chō) is a town in Saihaku District, Tottori Prefecture, Japan. As of 31 December 2021, the town had an estimated population of 10,420 in 3871 households and a population density of 75 persons per km^{2}. The total area of the town is 139.44 square kilometres (53.84 sq mi). On the west side of the train tracks just after leaving Hōki-Mizoguchi station, a very large green statue of an Oni is visible on the hill overlooking the town and the Hino River. Before the Kishimoto-Mizokuchi town merger which created Hōki, the oni was Mizokuchi's town mascot and as such is featured on manhole covers, phone booths, post boxes and even the town's highway rest stop (where the building housing the restrooms is shaped like a giant oni head).

== Geography ==
Hōki is located in the Chūgoku Mountains in western Tottori Prefecture. The major road through Hōki is Route 181, which winds through the mountains from Yonago all the way to Okayama prefecture in the south. For the majority of its length, Route 181 is a two-lane highway featuring steep switchbacks and often abrupt vertical drops to the valleys below. It roughly parallels the course of the Hino River until it reaches neighboring Kōfu, where Route 181 continues south, and Route 183 continues west to Nichinan and eventually Hiroshima, the capital of the Chūgoku region.

== Neighboring municipalities ==
Tottori Prefecture

- Yonago
- Daisen
- Nanbu
- Hino
- Kōfu

== Climate ==
Hōki is classified as a humid subtropical climate (Köppen Cfa) characterized by warm summers and cold winters with heavy snowfall. The average annual temperature in Hōki is 13.0 °C (55.4 °F). The average annual rainfall is 1,883 mm (74.1 in) with September as the wettest month. The temperatures are highest on average in August, at around 24.8 °C (76.6 °F), and lowest in January, at around 1.6 °C (34.9 °F).

== Demography ==
Per Japanese census data, the population of Hōki has been as follows.

Historical population
Year	Pop.	±%
1950	15,617	—
1960	14,321	−8.3%
1970	11,803	−17.6%
1980	12,071	+2.3%
1990	12,630	+4.6%
2000	12,663	+0.3%
2010	11,624	−8.2%

== History ==
The area of Hōki was part of ancient Hōki Province. During the Edo Period, it was part of the holdings of the Ikeda clan of Tottori Domain. Following the Meiji restoration. the area was organized into villages within Hino District and Saihaku District, Tottori on October 1, 1889, with the establishment of the modern municipalities system. Hōki was formed on January 1, 2005, as the result of the merger of the town of Kishimoto, from Saihaku District, and the town of Mizokuchi, from Hino District.

== Government ==
Hōki has a mayor-council form of government with a directly elected mayor and a unicameral town council of 14 members. Hōki, collectively with the other municipalities of Saihaku District, contributes three members to the Tottori Prefectural Assembly.. In terms of national politics, the town is part of Tottori 2nd district of the lower house of the Diet of Japan.

== Economy ==
The economy of Hōki is primarily agricultural with some light manufacturing.

== Education ==
Hōki has four public elementary schools and two public junior high schools operated by the town government. The town does not have a high school, and high schoolers typically take a bus to neighboring Yonago.

== Transportation ==
=== Railway ===
JR West - Hakubi Line

- Hōki-Mizoguchi - Kishimoto

=== Highways ===
- Yonago Expressway
- National Route 181
- National Route 183
- National Route 482

== Local attractions ==
- Shōji Ueda Museum of Photography

== Noted people from Hōki ==
- Shōji Ueda, photographer
