= Sakane Station =

Railway station in Niimi, Okayama Prefecture, Japan

Sakane Station 坂根駅
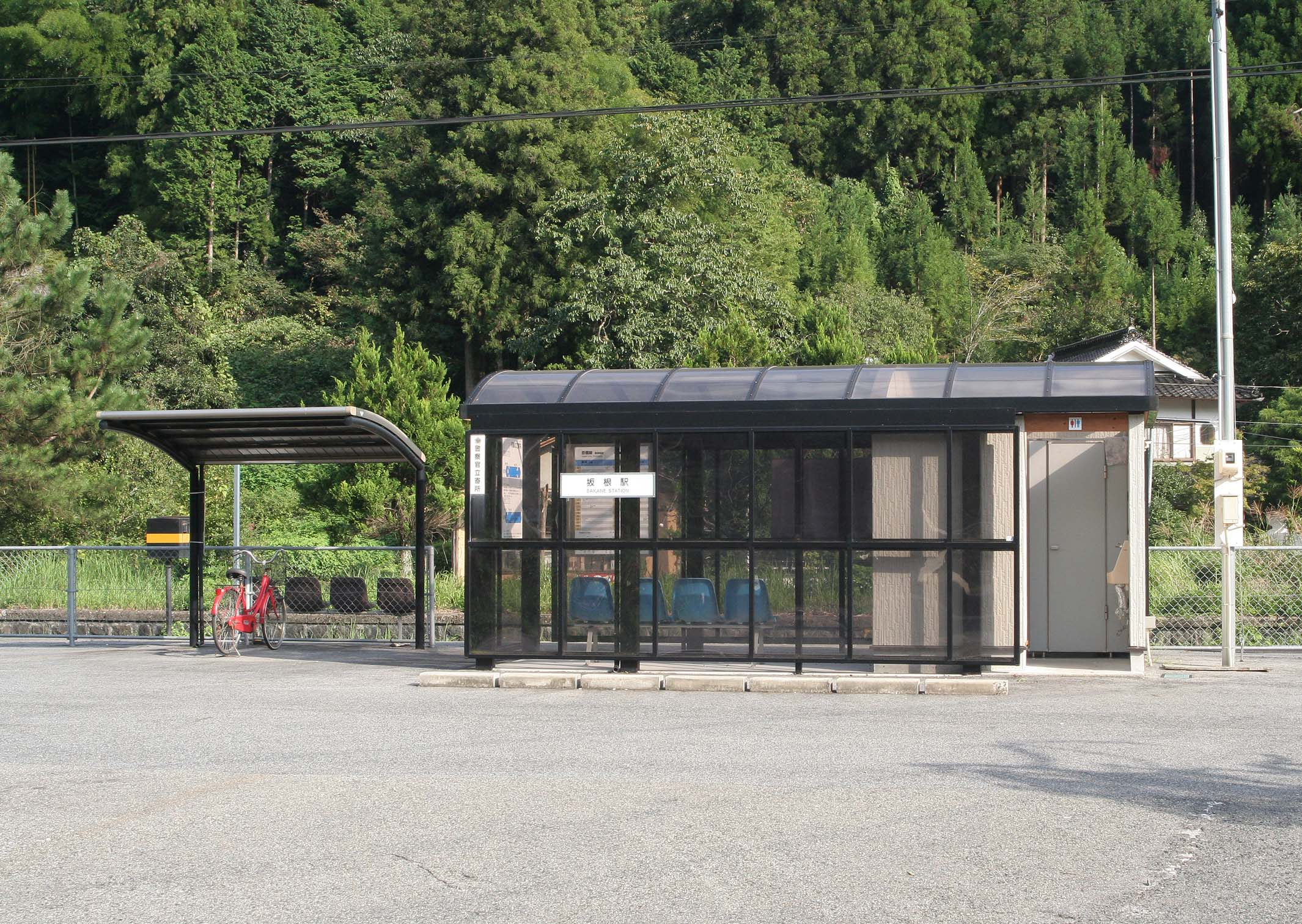
- Sakane Station, September 2007

General information
- Location: Shingo Shimokojiro,, Niimi-shi, Okayama-ken 719-3611; Japan
- Coordinates: 34°58′22.67″N 133°22′14.78″E
- Operator: JR West
- Line: P Geibi Line
- Distance: 3.9 km (2.4 miles) from Bitchū-Kōjiro
- Platforms: 1 side platform
- Tracks: 1

Other information
- Status: Unstaffed
- Website: Official website

History
- Opened: 15 December 1953

Passengers
- 2019: 2 daily

Services
Preceding station	JR West	Following station
Ichioka towards Hiroshima	Geibi Line Local	Bitchū-Kōjiro towards Niimi
Location
- Location within Okayama Prefecture Location within Japan

Looking toward Bitchū Kōjiro Station from the platform

Looking toward Ichioka Station from the platform

Sakane Station (坂根駅, Sakane-eki) is a passenger railway station located in the city of Niimi, Okayama Prefecture, Japan. It is operated by the West Japan Railway Company (JR West).

== Lines ==
Sakane Station is served by the Geibi Line, and is located 3.9 kilometers from the terminus of the line at Bitchū-Kōjiro and 10.3 kilometers from Niimi.

== Station layout ==
The station consists of one ground-level side platform serving a single bi-directional track. There is no station building, but only a waiting room and the station is unattended.

== History ==
Sakane Station was opened on February 10, 1930, with the creation of the Sanshin Line between Yagami Station and Bitchū Kōjiro Station. It became part of JR West in 1987 when Japan National Railways was privatized. An enclosed waiting room was constructed in 2004 for the convenience of passengers.

== Passenger statistics ==
In fiscal 2019, the station was used by an average of 2 passengers daily.

== Surrounding area ==
- Japan National Route 182

== See also ==
- List of railway stations in Japan
