= Tōjō Station (Hiroshima) =

Railway station in Shōbara, Hiroshima Prefecture, Japan

Tōjō Station 東城駅
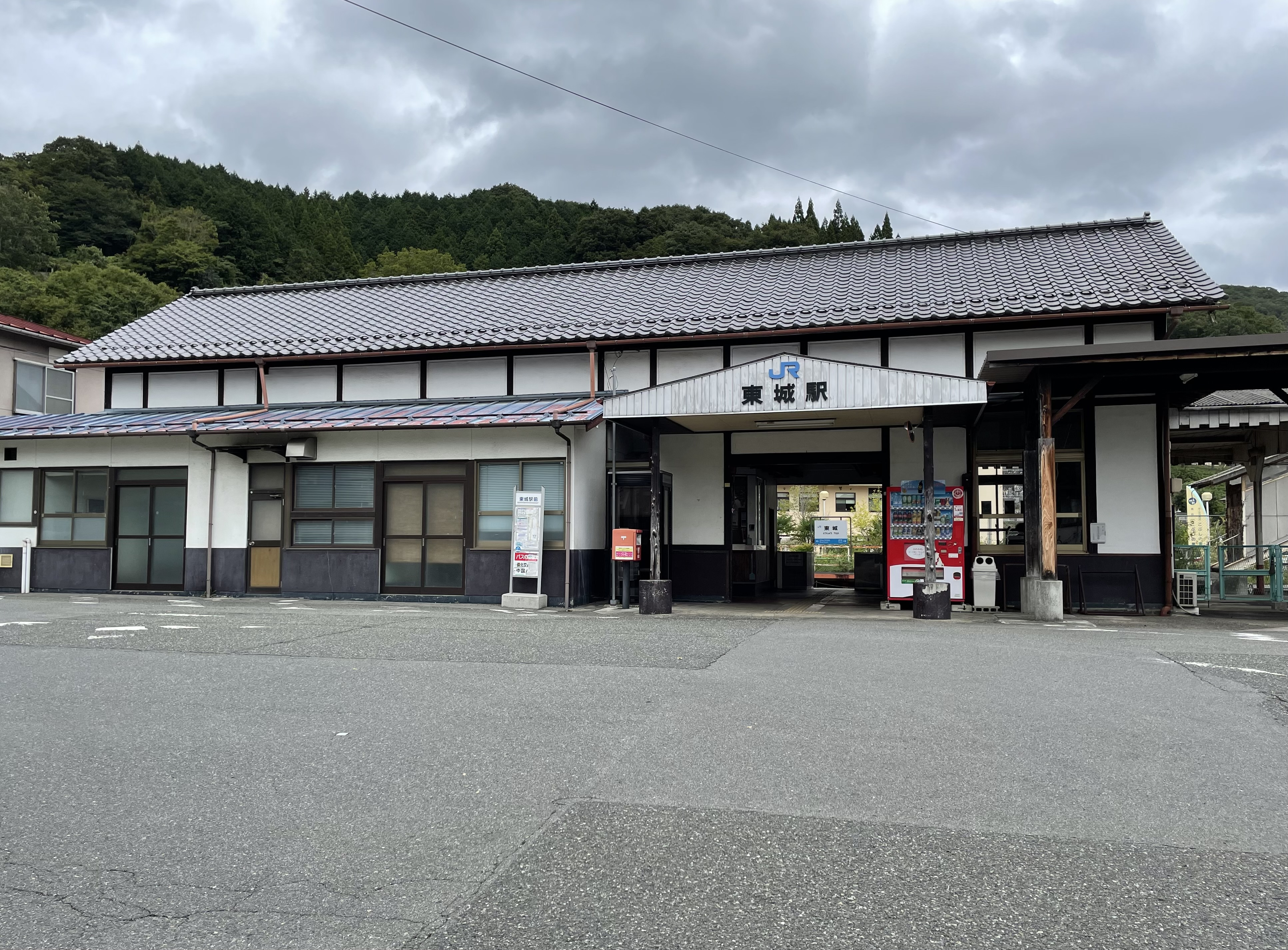
- Tōjō Station (September 2024)

General information
- Location: 160-3 Kawahigashi, Tōjō-chō, Shōbara-shi, Hiroshima-ken 729-5121; Japan
- Coordinates: 34°54′5.68″N 133°16′25.71″E
- Operator: JR West
- Line: P Geibi Line
- Distance: 18.8 km (11.7 miles) from Bitchū-Kōjiro
- Platforms: 1 side platform
- Tracks: 1

Other information
- Status: Staffed
- Website: Official website

History
- Opened: November 25, 1930

Passengers
- 2019: 11 daily
Location
- Location within Hiroshima Prefecture Location within Japan

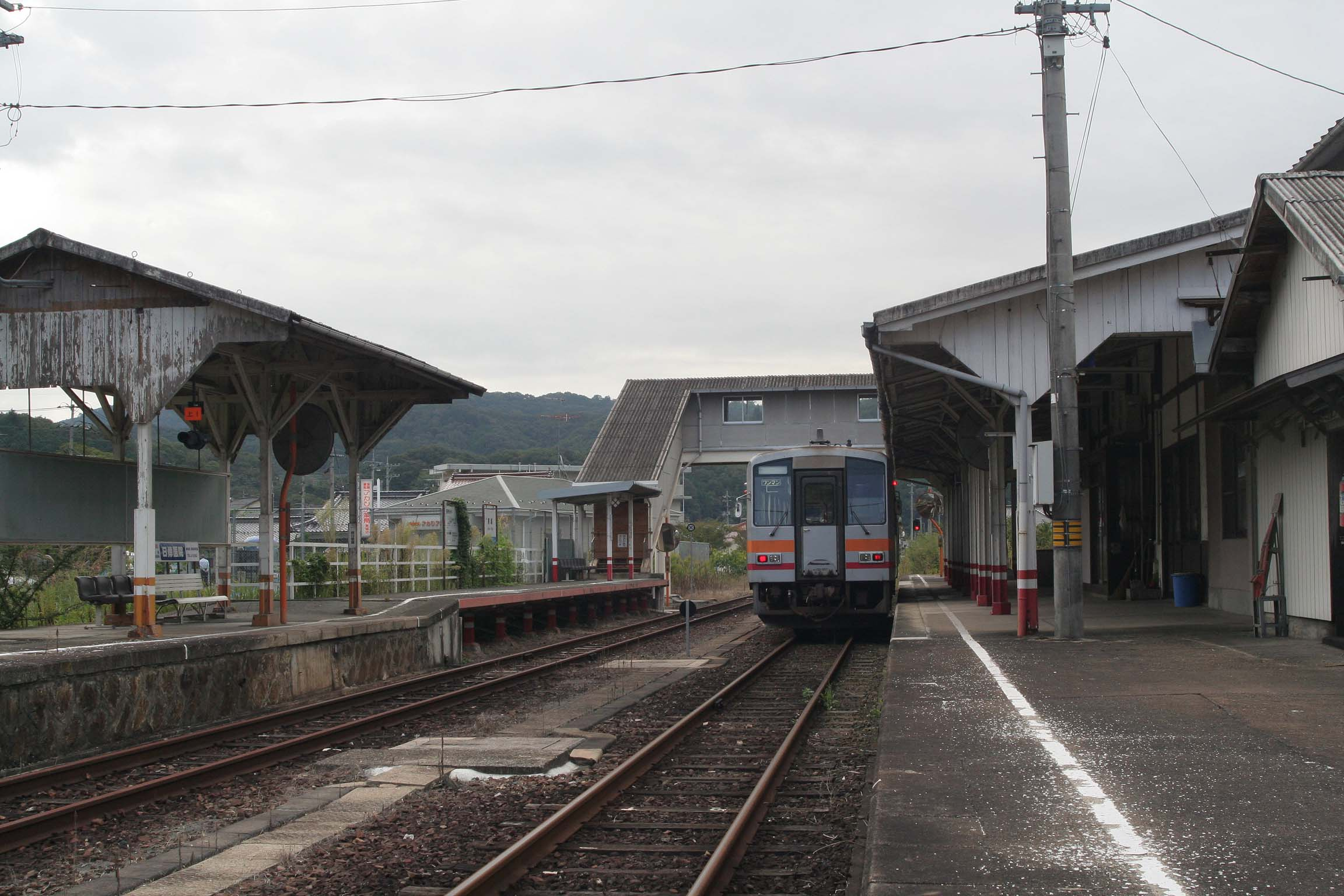
Station platforms (October 2007)

Tōjō Station (東城駅, Tōjō-eki) is a passenger railway station located in Kawatō, Tōjō-chō, in the city of Shōbara, Hiroshima Prefecture, Japan. It is operated by the West Japan Railway Company (JR West).

== Lines ==
Tōjō Station is served by the Geibi Line, and is located 18.8 kilometers from the terminus of the line at Bitchū-Kōjiro and 25.2 kilometers from Niimi.

== Station layout ==
The station consists of one ground-level side platform serving a single bi-directional track. Originally, it was a station with two opposite side platforms and two tracks, but the footbridge to the opposing platform (Platform 1) has become unusable due to aging and cannot be entered. As a result, it currently operates as a one platform station. However Platform 1 remains in situ. The station building is located beside the remaining platform. The station is only staffed during the morning hours, and is unattended otherwise.

== Adjacent stations ==
«	Service	»
Geibi Line
Yagami	Rapid	Bingo Yawata
Nochi	Local	Bingo Yawata

== History ==
Tōjō Station was opened on November 25, 1930 as a terminal station of the Sanshin line to Yagami Station. The station became a through station on June 15, 1935 when the extension towards Onuka Station was opened. Service was renamed to the Geibi Line on July 1, 1937. It became part of JR West in 1987 when Japan National Railways was privatized.

== Passenger statistics ==
In fiscal 2019, the station was used by an average of 11 passengers daily.

== Surrounding area ==
The station serves the town of Tōjō. Hiroshima Prefectural Tōjō High School is located near the station. The Tōjō branches of the Shōbara city hall and police are also located nearby. Japan National Route 182 is accessible from the station as well.

== See also ==
- List of railway stations in Japan
