= Nochi Station =

Railway station in Niimi, Okayama Prefecture, Japan

Nochi Station 野馳駅
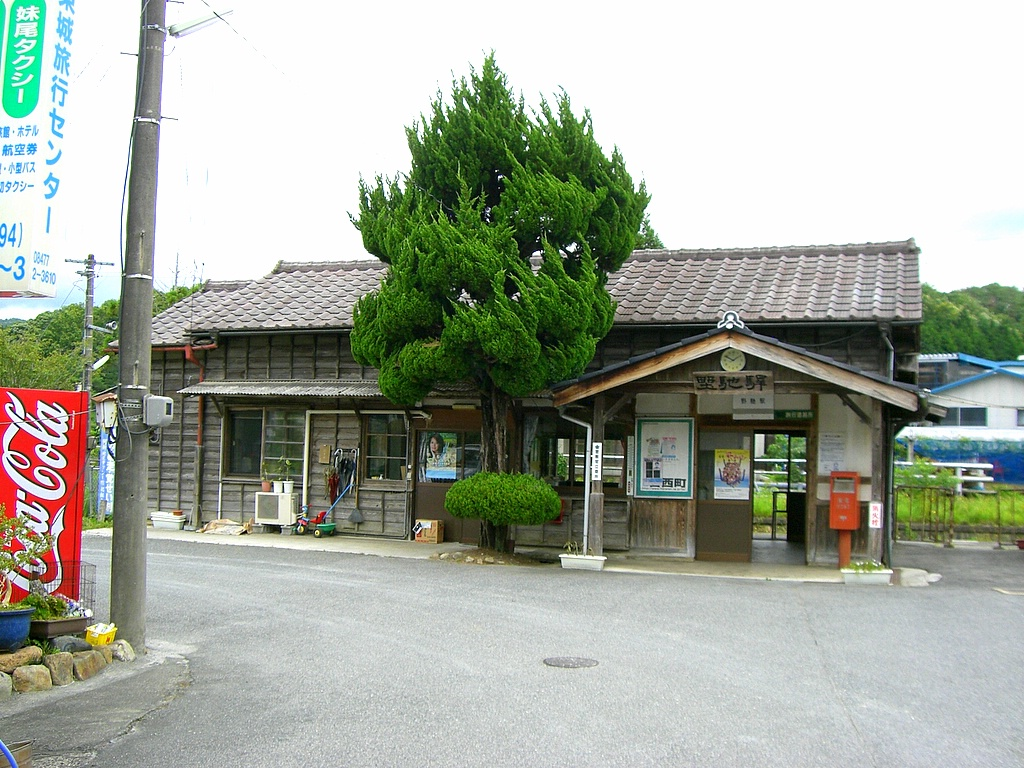
- Nochi Station, September 2007

General information
- Location: Hataki, Tessei-chō, Niimi-shi, Okayama-ken 719-3812; Japan
- Coordinates: 34°54′54.17″N 133°19′0.6″E
- Operator: JR West
- Line: P Geibi Line
- Distance: 13.6 km (8.5 miles) from Bitchū-Kōjiro
- Platforms: 1 side platform
- Tracks: 1

Other information
- Status: Unstaffed
- Website: Official website

History
- Opened: November 25, 1930

Passengers
- 2019: 26 daily

Services
Preceding station	JR West	Following station
Tōjō towards Hiroshima	Geibi Line Local	Yagami towards Niimi
Location
- Location within Okayama Prefecture Location within Japan

Nochi Station (野馳駅, Nochi-eki) is a passenger railway station located in the city of Niimi, Okayama Prefecture, Japan. It is operated by the West Japan Railway Company (JR West).

== Lines ==
Nochi Station is served by the Geibi Line, and is located 13.6 kilometers from the terminus of the line at Bitchū-Kōjiro and 20.0 kilometers from Niimi.

== Station layout ==
The station consists of one ground-level side platform serving a single bi-directional track. The old wooden station building from the time of its opening still exists, but the station is staffed.

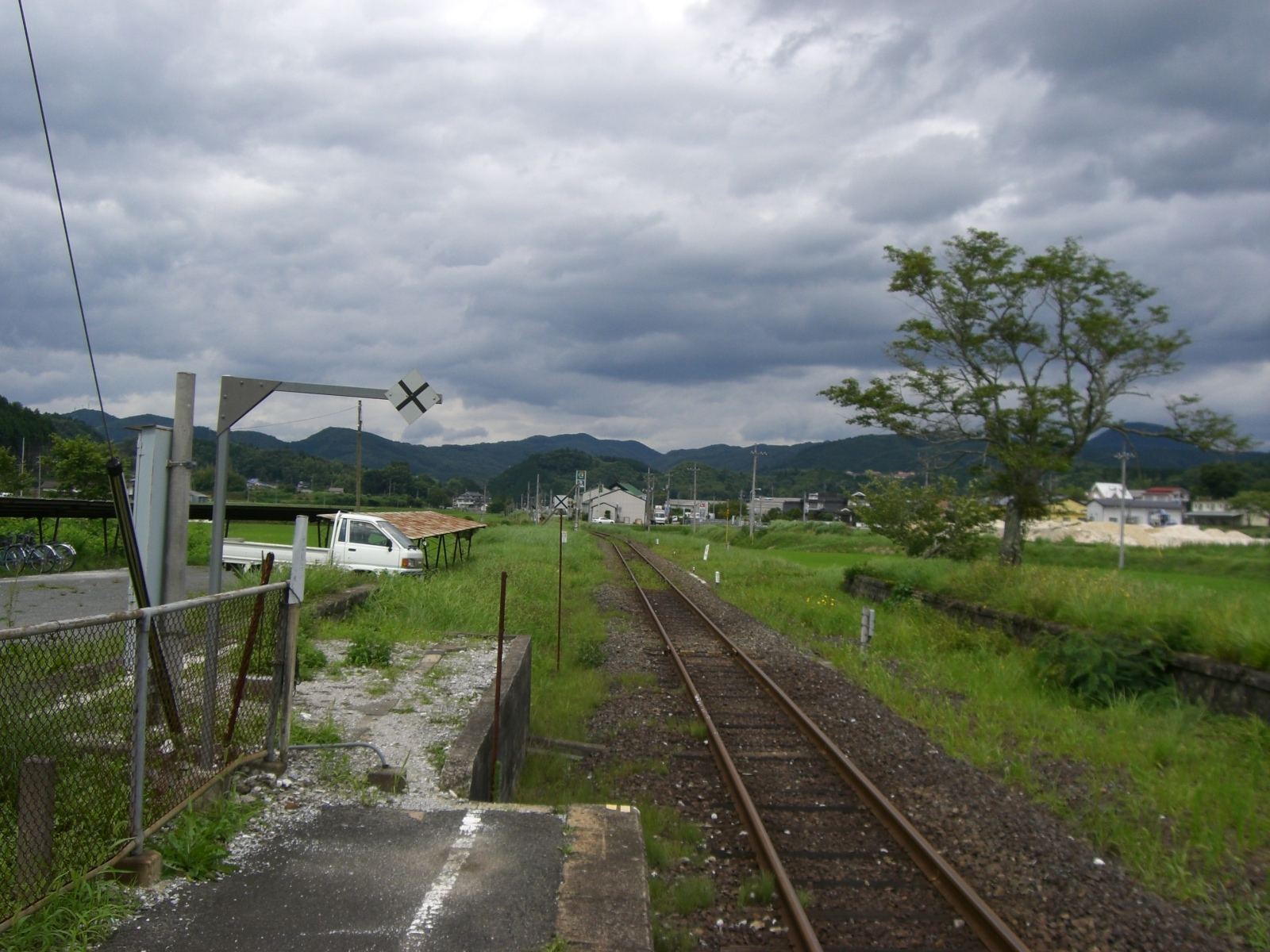
Nochi Station looking toward Bitchū Kōjiro Station (2006-07-29)

Nochi Station looking toward Tōjō Station (2006-07-29)

Nochi Station platform sign (2006-07-29)

Nochi Station platform (2006-07-29)

== History ==
Nochi Station was opened on November 25, 1930. It became part of JR West in 1987 when Japan National Railways was privatized.

== Passenger statistics ==
In fiscal 2019, the station was used by an average of 26 passengers daily.

== Surrounding area ==
- Japan National Route 182

== See also ==
- List of railway stations in Japan
