= Ichioka Station =

Railway station in Niimi, Okayama Prefecture, Japan

Ichioka Station 市岡駅
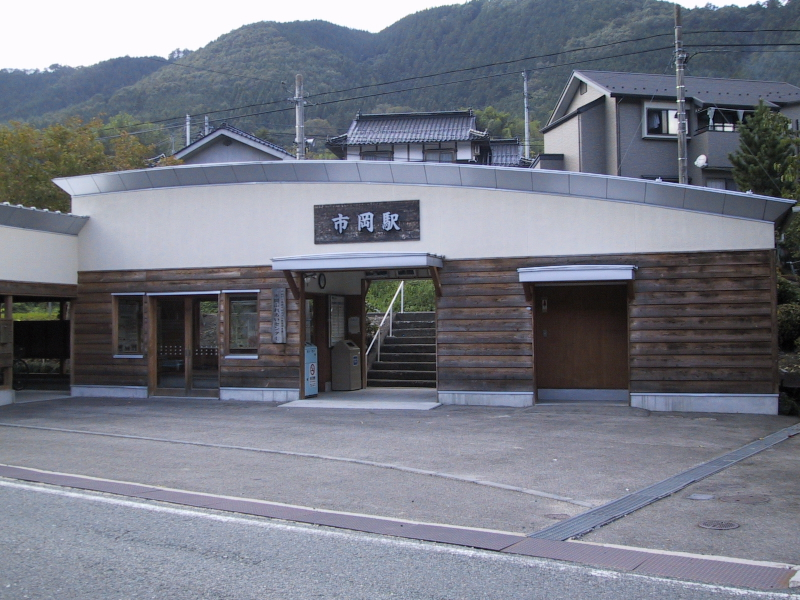
- Ichioka Station, October 2005

General information
- Location: Kamikōjiro, Tessei-chō, Niimi-shi, Okayama-ken 719-3702; Japan
- Coordinates: 34°57′58.4″N 133°20′48.3″E
- Operator: JR West
- Line: P Geibi Line
- Distance: 6.5 km (4.0 miles) from Bitchū-Kōjiro
- Platforms: 1 side platform
- Tracks: 1

Other information
- Status: Unstaffed
- Website: Official website

History
- Opened: 1 October 1953

Passengers
- 2019: 8 daily

Services
Preceding station	JR West	Following station
Yagami towards Hiroshima	Geibi Line Local	Sakane towards Niimi
Location
- Location within Okayama Prefecture Location within Japan

Ichioka Station (市岡駅, Ichioka-eki) is a passenger railway station located in the city of Niimi, Okayama Prefecture, Japan. It is operated by the West Japan Railway Company (JR West).

== Lines ==
Ichioka Station is served by the Geibi Line, and is located 6.5 kilometers from the terminus of the line at Bitchū-Kōjiro and 12.8 kilometers from Niimi.

== Station layout ==
The station consists of one ground-level side platform serving a single bi-directional track. The station building is relatively new and named 'Ichioka Fureai Center', but is unattended.

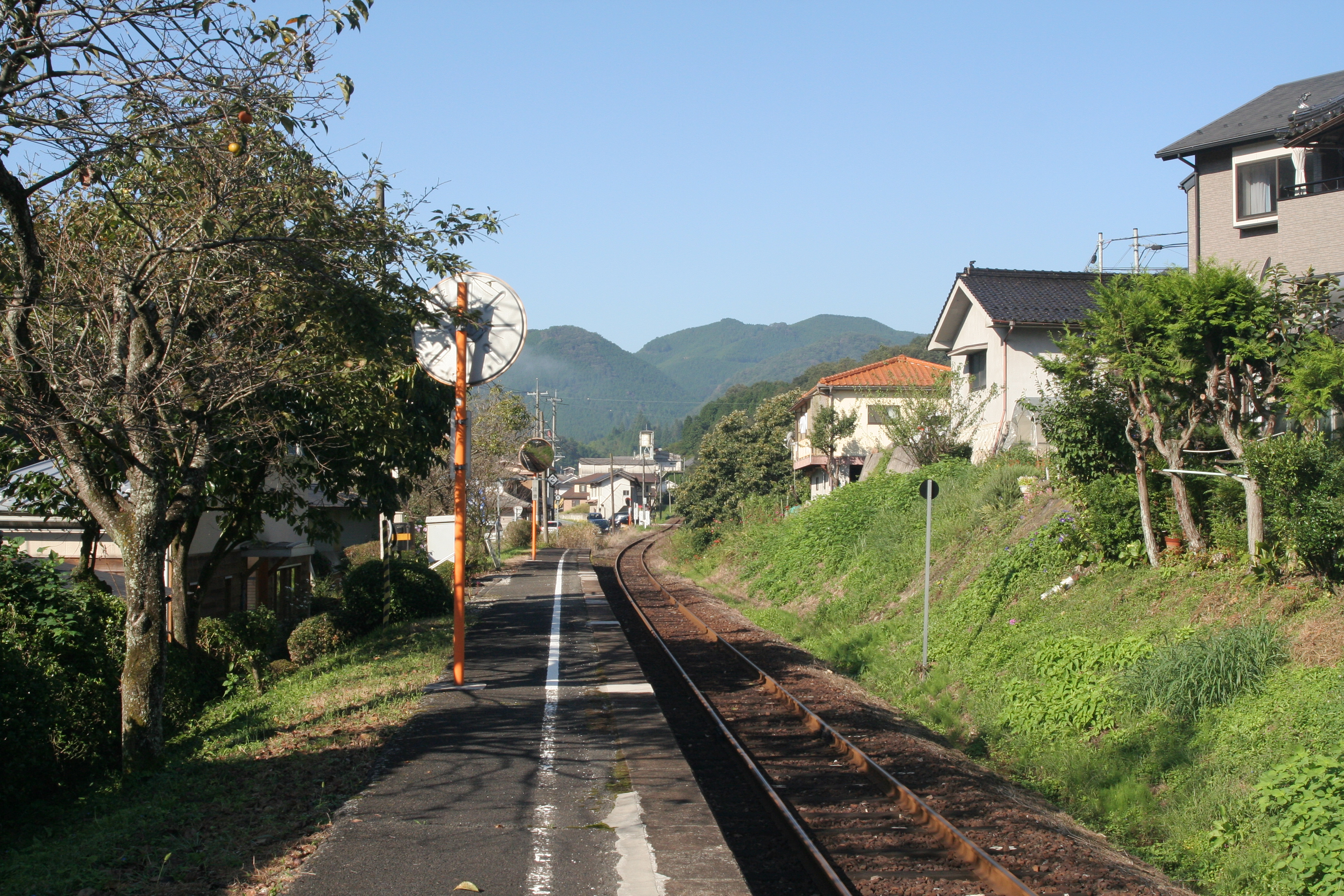
Platforms

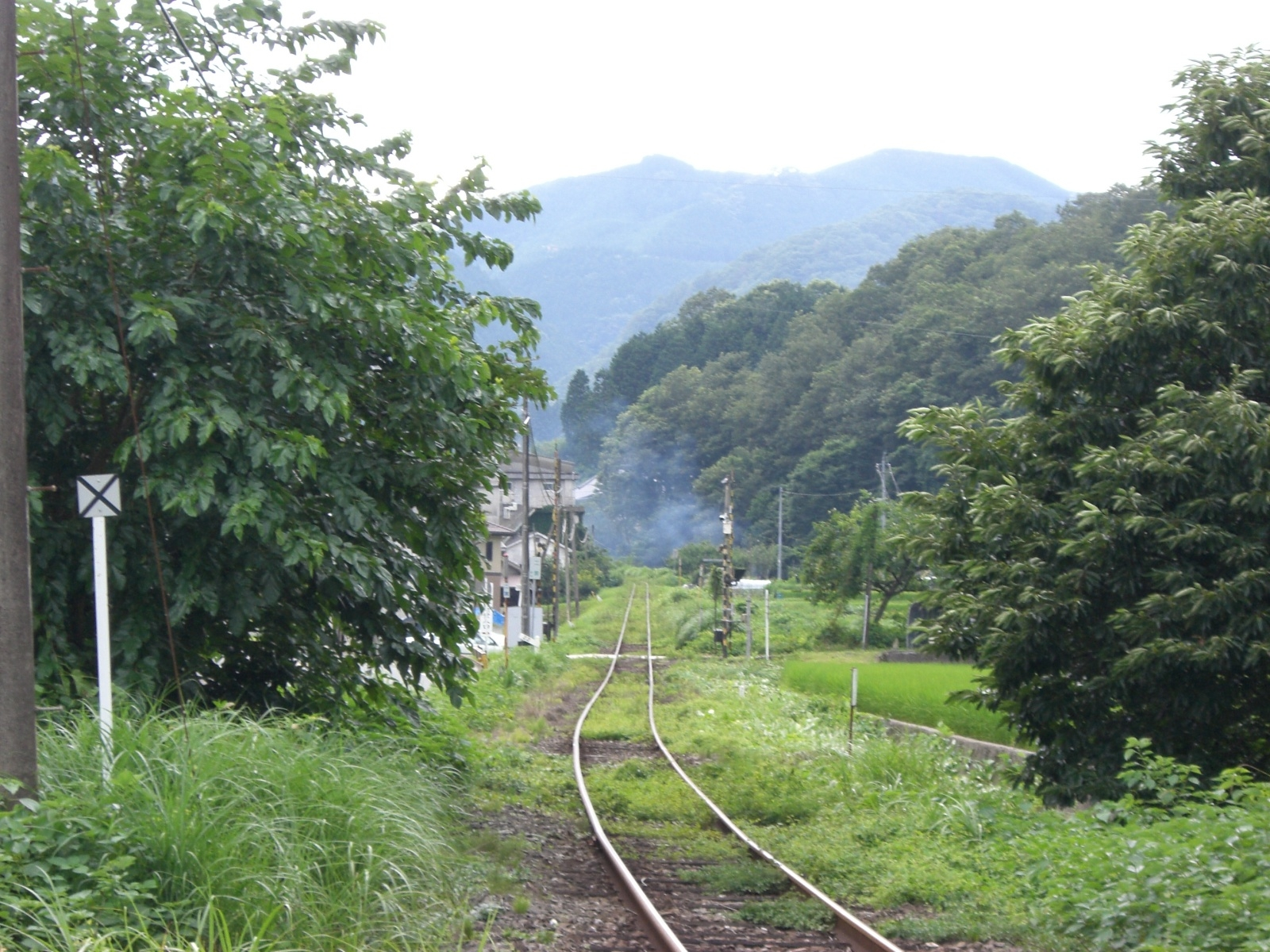
On the platform looking toward Tōjō Station

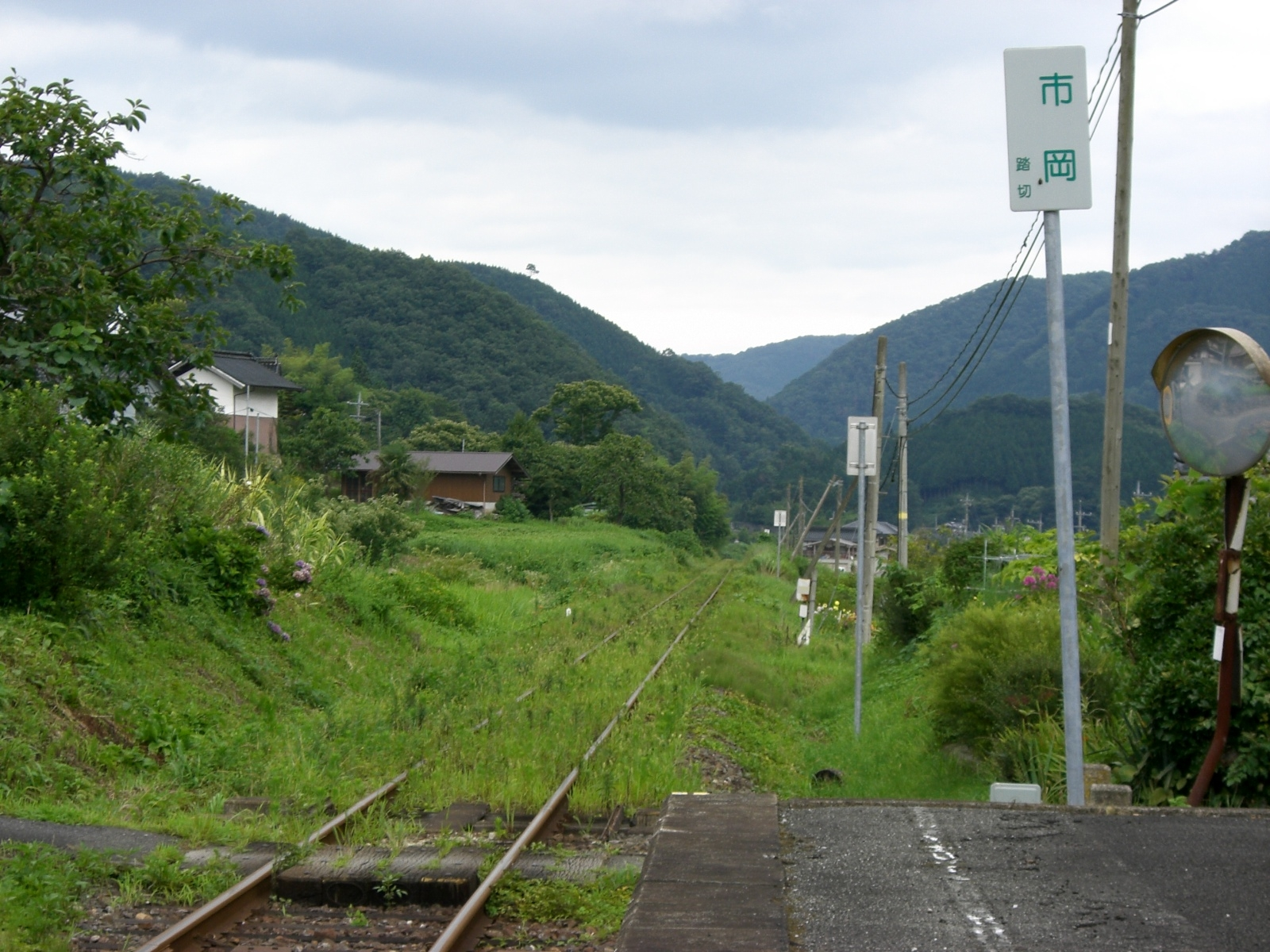
On the platform looking toward Bitchū-Kōjiro Station

== History ==
Ichioka Station was opened on October 1, 1953. It became part of JR West in 1987 when Japan National Railways was privatized. An enclosed waiting room was constructed in 2004 for the convenience of passengers.

== Passenger statistics ==
In fiscal 2019, the station was used by an average of 8 passengers daily.

== Surrounding area ==
- Japan National Route 182

== See also ==
- List of railway stations in Japan
