= Shingō, Okayama =

Town in Okayama Prefecture, Japan

Shingō (神郷町, Shingō-chō) was a town located in Atetsu District, Okayama Prefecture, Japan.

As of 2003, the town had an estimated population of 2,511 and a density of 18.41 persons per km^{2}. The total area was 136.37 km^{2}.

On March 31, 2005, Shingō, along with the towns of Ōsa, Tessei and Tetta (all from Atetsu District), was merged into the expanded city of Niimi.
