= Atetsu District, Okayama =

Former district in Okayama prefecture, Japan

Atetsu (阿哲郡, Atetsu-gun) was a district located in Okayama Prefecture, Japan.

As of 2003, the district had an estimated population of 13,546 and a density of 30.70 persons per km^{2}. The total area was 441.28 km^{2}.

== Towns and villages ==
- Ōsa
- Shingō
- Tessei
- Tetta

== Merger ==
- On March 31, 2005 - the towns of Ōsa, Shingō, Tessei and Tetta were merged into the expanded city of Niimi. Therefore, Atetsu District was dissolved as a result of this merger.
