= Ōsa, Okayama =

Dissolved municipality in Okayama prefecture, Japan

Ōsa (大佐町, Ōsa-chō) was a town located in Atetsu District, Okayama Prefecture, Japan.

As of 2003, the town had an estimated population of 3,922 and a density of 32.35 persons per km^{2}. The total area was 121.25 km^{2}.

On March 31, 2005, Ōsa, along with the towns of Shingō, Tessei and Tetta (all from Atetsu District), was merged into the expanded city of Niimi.
