= Niimi =

Niimi 新見市
- City
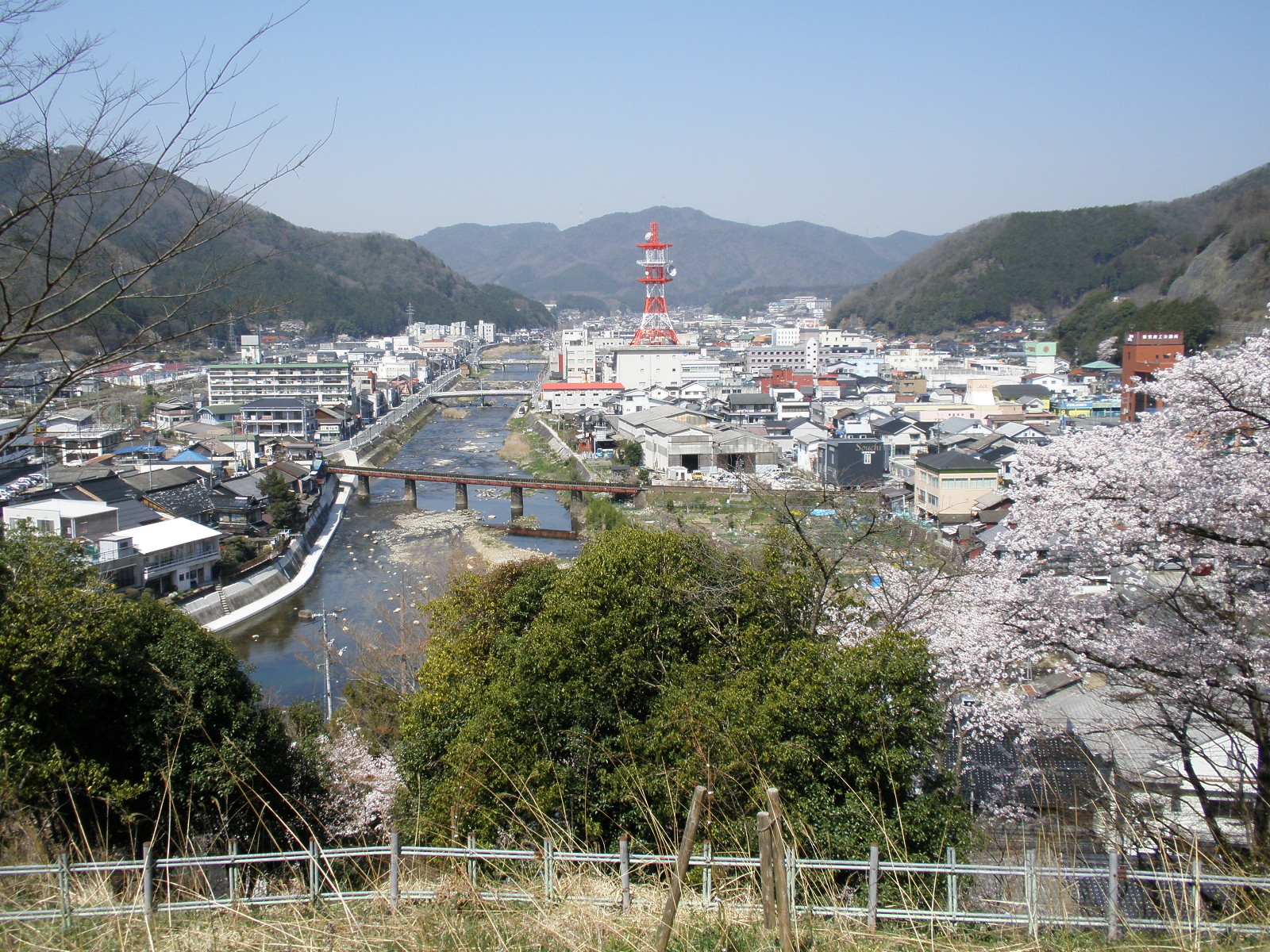
- Niimi City

- Flag Seal
- Location of Niimi in Okayama Prefecture

- Location in Japan
- Coordinates: 34°58′26″N 133°28′23″E
- Country: Japan
- Region: Chūgoku (San'yō)
- Prefecture: Okayama Prefecture

Government
  - Mayor: Minoru Ishida (since 2024)

Area
  - Total: 793.29 km^{2} (306.29 sq mi)

Population (February 28, 2023)
  - Total: 27,106
  - Density: 34.169/km^{2} (88.498/sq mi)
- Time zone: UTC+09:00 (JST)
- City hall address: Niimi 310-3, Niimi-shi, Okayama-ken 718-0011
- Climate: Cfa
- Website: www.city.niimi.okayama.jp
- Symbols
- Bird: Cettia diphone
- Flower: Azalea
- Tree: Chamaecyparis

Niimi (新見市, Niimi-shi) is a city located in northwestern Okayama Prefecture, Japan. As of 28 February 2023, the city had an estimated population of 27,106 in 12,626 households. and a population density of 34 persons per km^{2}. The total area of the city is 793.29 square kilometres (306.29 sq mi)

== Geography ==
Niimi is located on a karst plateau in the Chugoku Mountains in northeast Okayama Prefecture. More than 85% of the city area is mountainous, with Mount Hanami being the highest peak at 1188 meters. Due to the rugged terrain, there are many waterfalls, dams, hot springs and multiple limestone caves in the city. The main urban area is located on the upper reaches of the Takahashi River (110.7 kilometres (68.8 mi).

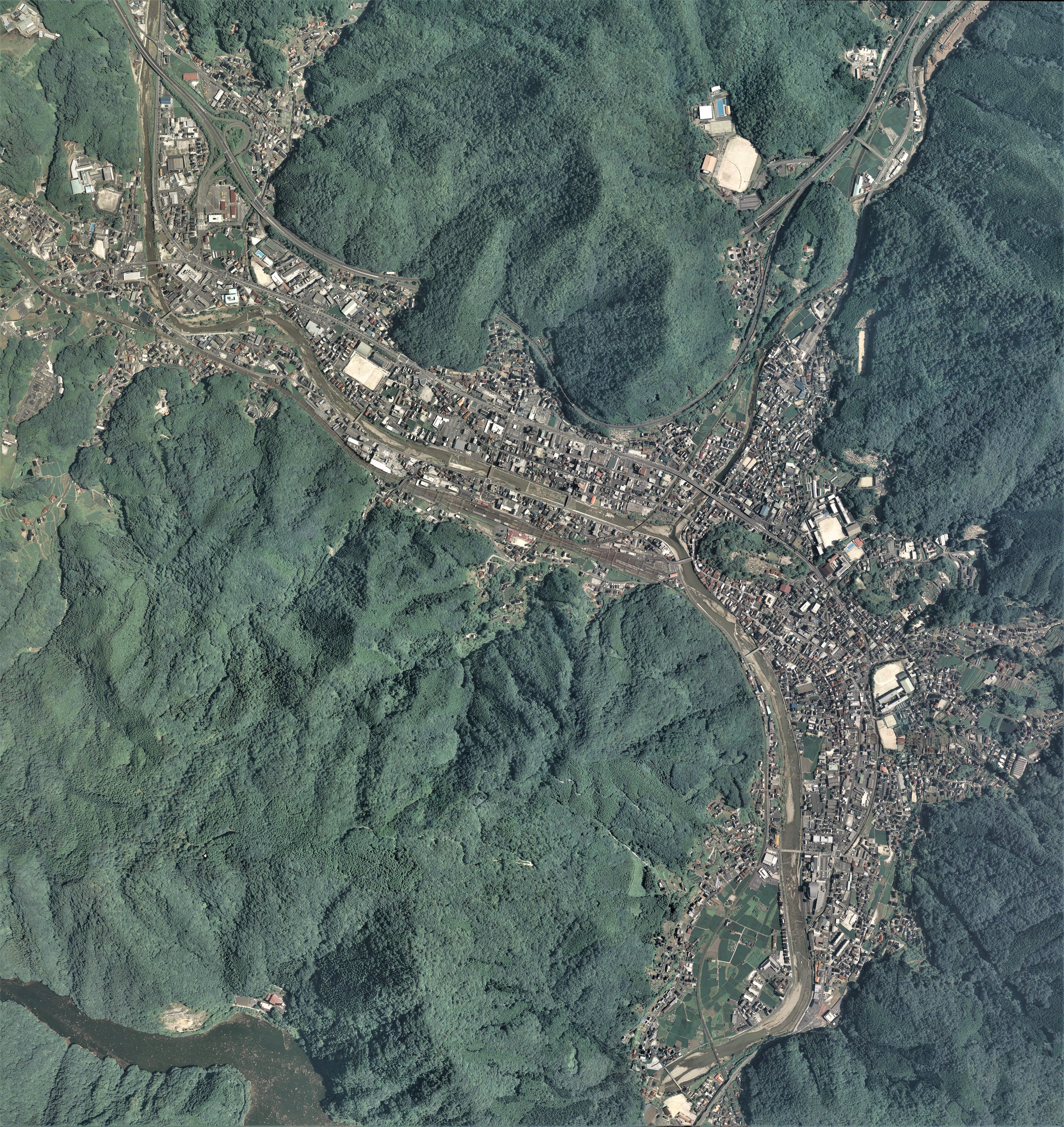
Aerial photograph of Niimi city center

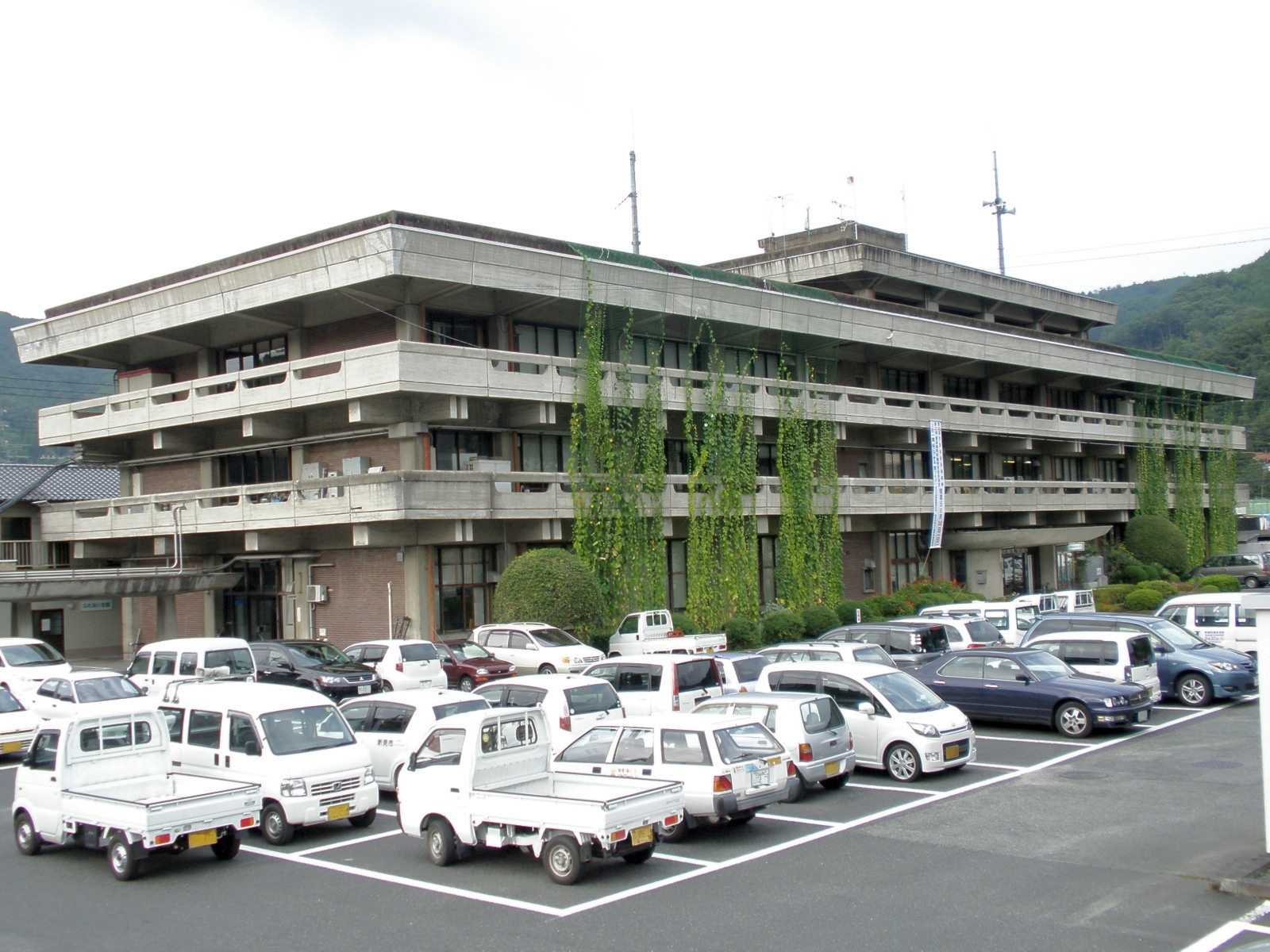
Niimi City Office

=== Neighboring municipalities ===
Hiroshima Prefecture

- Shōbara

Okayama Prefecture

- Maniwa
- Shinjō
- Takahashi

Tottori Prefecture

- Hino
- Nichinan

=== Demographics ===
Per Japanese census data, the population of Niimi in 2020 was 28,079 people. Niimi has been conducting censuses since 1920.

Historical population
Year	Pop.	±%
1920	45,231	—
1925	47,793	+5.7%
1930	50,725	+6.1%
1935	51,149	+0.8%
1940	51,795	+1.3%
1945	63,627	+22.8%
1950	65,058	+2.2%
1955	66,146	+1.7%
1960	62,297	−5.8%
1965	55,164	−11.4%
1970	48,967	−11.2%
1975	46,726	−4.6%
1980	44,882	−3.9%
1985	44,019	−1.9%
1990	42,264	−4.0%
1995	39,891	−5.6%
2000	38,492	−3.5%
2005	36,073	−6.3%
2010	33,865	−6.1%
2015	30,658	−9.5%
2020	28,079	−8.4%
Niimi population statistics

== Climate ==
Niimi has a humid subtropical climate (Köppen climate classification Cfa). The average annual temperature in Niimi is 12.4 °C (54.3 °F). The average annual rainfall is 1,361.1 mm (53.59 in) with July as the wettest month. The temperatures are highest on average in August, at around 24.5 °C (76.1 °F), and lowest in January, at around 1.1 °C (34.0 °F). The highest temperature ever recorded in Niimi was 37.1 °C (98.8 °F) on 24 July 2026; the coldest temperature ever recorded was −14.9 °C (5.2 °F) on 28 February 1981.During the winter, temperatures are low, and snowfall occurs, leading to snow accumulation. The former Niimi City, former Shingō Town, and former Ōsa Town are known as heavy snowfall areas within Okayama Prefecture. Due to this, several ski resorts, including the Chiya Ski Resort, have been established within the city.

Climate data for Niimi (1991–2020 normals, extremes 1978–present)
Month	Jan	Feb	Mar	Apr	May	Jun	Jul	Aug	Sep	Oct	Nov	Dec	Year
Record high °C (°F)	16.0 (60.8)	19.7 (67.5)	24.5 (76.1)	30.1 (86.2)	33.0 (91.4)	33.8 (92.8)	36.8 (98.2)	36.9 (98.4)	34.6 (94.3)	30.1 (86.2)	25.6 (78.1)	19.7 (67.5)	36.9 (98.4)
Mean daily maximum °C (°F)	5.7 (42.3)	6.9 (44.4)	11.3 (52.3)	17.7 (63.9)	22.6 (72.7)	25.2 (77.4)	28.9 (84.0)	30.2 (86.4)	25.7 (78.3)	20.0 (68.0)	14.1 (57.4)	8.1 (46.6)	18.0 (64.4)
Daily mean °C (°F)	1.1 (34.0)	1.7 (35.1)	5.2 (41.4)	10.9 (51.6)	15.9 (60.6)	19.7 (67.5)	23.7 (74.7)	24.5 (76.1)	20.2 (68.4)	14.1 (57.4)	8.3 (46.9)	3.2 (37.8)	12.4 (54.3)
Mean daily minimum °C (°F)	−2.8 (27.0)	−2.7 (27.1)	−0.2 (31.6)	4.4 (39.9)	9.7 (49.5)	15.1 (59.2)	19.9 (67.8)	20.5 (68.9)	16.2 (61.2)	9.4 (48.9)	3.6 (38.5)	−0.8 (30.6)	7.7 (45.9)
Record low °C (°F)	−9.9 (14.2)	−11.4 (11.5)	−8.0 (17.6)	−4.5 (23.9)	−0.8 (30.6)	5.2 (41.4)	9.9 (49.8)	12.2 (54.0)	3.7 (38.7)	−0.3 (31.5)	−4.4 (24.1)	−7.1 (19.2)	−11.4 (11.5)
Average precipitation mm (inches)	50.9 (2.00)	56.9 (2.24)	100.9 (3.97)	104.3 (4.11)	135.6 (5.34)	178.1 (7.01)	235.0 (9.25)	116.8 (4.60)	176.6 (6.95)	95.0 (3.74)	61.6 (2.43)	54.8 (2.16)	1,361.1 (53.59)
Average precipitation days (≥ 1.0 mm)	8.3	9.2	10.7	9.7	10.0	11.9	12.5	9.4	10.0	7.1	7.3	8.6	115.2
Mean monthly sunshine hours	111.8	122.3	159.8	183.7	200.5	143.0	149.0	177.5	144.8	155.8	128.7	112.9	1,790.5
Source: Japan Meteorological Agency (1991–2020 normals, extremes 1978–present)

Climate data for Chiya, Niimi (1991–2020 normals, extremes 1978–present)
Month	Jan	Feb	Mar	Apr	May	Jun	Jul	Aug	Sep	Oct	Nov	Dec	Year
Record high °C (°F)	14.6 (58.3)	20.0 (68.0)	24.2 (75.6)	29.0 (84.2)	31.4 (88.5)	34.7 (94.5)	35.4 (95.7)	35.1 (95.2)	33.3 (91.9)	28.8 (83.8)	24.3 (75.7)	18.7 (65.7)	35.4 (95.7)
Mean daily maximum °C (°F)	3.9 (39.0)	5.1 (41.2)	9.8 (49.6)	16.4 (61.5)	21.2 (70.2)	24.0 (75.2)	27.5 (81.5)	28.6 (83.5)	24.3 (75.7)	18.8 (65.8)	13.0 (55.4)	6.7 (44.1)	16.6 (61.9)
Daily mean °C (°F)	−0.2 (31.6)	0.3 (32.5)	3.7 (38.7)	9.4 (48.9)	14.5 (58.1)	18.4 (65.1)	22.4 (72.3)	23.1 (73.6)	18.9 (66.0)	12.7 (54.9)	7.1 (44.8)	2.0 (35.6)	11.0 (51.8)
Mean daily minimum °C (°F)	−3.8 (25.2)	−3.9 (25.0)	−1.6 (29.1)	2.6 (36.7)	7.8 (46.0)	13.3 (55.9)	18.3 (64.9)	18.8 (65.8)	14.4 (57.9)	7.4 (45.3)	1.9 (35.4)	−1.9 (28.6)	6.1 (43.0)
Record low °C (°F)	−13.4 (7.9)	−14.9 (5.2)	−12.1 (10.2)	−6.4 (20.5)	−3.0 (26.6)	1.9 (35.4)	6.7 (44.1)	10.0 (50.0)	1.3 (34.3)	−2.6 (27.3)	−5.7 (21.7)	−10.8 (12.6)	−14.9 (5.2)
Average precipitation mm (inches)	106.1 (4.18)	102.2 (4.02)	137.5 (5.41)	131.8 (5.19)	149.5 (5.89)	193.1 (7.60)	264.5 (10.41)	162.1 (6.38)	218.0 (8.58)	123.8 (4.87)	91.0 (3.58)	113.9 (4.48)	1,783.5 (70.22)
Average snowfall cm (inches)	136 (54)	124 (49)	39 (15)	1 (0.4)	0 (0)	0 (0)	0 (0)	0 (0)	0 (0)	0 (0)	1 (0.4)	66 (26)	368 (145)
Average precipitation days (≥ 1.0 mm)	17.0	14.9	14.7	11.4	11.0	12.4	13.7	10.9	11.7	9.1	11.8	16.0	154.4
Mean monthly sunshine hours	70.1	82.0	135.1	175.4	190.9	136.3	128.6	162.3	126.1	141.6	111.5	79.3	1,534.1
Source: Japan Meteorological Agency (1991–2020 normals, extremes 1978–present)

== History ==
Niimi was part of ancient Bitchū Province and was divided between Aga District and Tetsuta District by the Takahashi River. It appears in documentary records as early as the Heian period (794–1185) when a shōen manorial estate called Niimi-shō' occupied much of the area of present-day Niimi. In the middle of the Kamakura period, the Niimi clan, served as jito of northern Bitchū and built a castle at Niimi as their residence. After that, the area became the territory of Tō-ji temple in Kyoto and later was under the control of the Amago clan during the Sengoku period. During the early Edo Period, it was part of the holdings of Bitchū-Matsuyama Domain and developed as an important center of inland trade, due to its connection by the Takahashi River with the jōkamachi of Matsuyama. In 1697, the Tokugawa Shogunate established Niimi Domain, which was ruled by the Seki clan to the Meiji restoration. The village of Niimi was established on July 22, 1889 with the creation of the modern municipalities system. It was raised to town status on February 26, 1896. Most of the town was destroyed by a fire on April 15, 1938. Niimi was raised to city status on June 1, 1954.

On March 31, 2005, Niimi absorbed the towns of Ōsa, Shingō, Tessei and Tetta (all from Atetsu District) to become a larger and expanded Niimi.

== Government ==
Niimi has a mayor-council form of government with a directly elected mayor and a unicameral city legislature of 16 members. The city contributes one member to the Okayama Prefectural Assembly. In terms of national politics, the city is part of Okayama 3rd district of the lower house of the Diet of Japan.

== Economy ==
Niimi was historically known for its iron sand quarries and the production of wagyu beef. The "Takenotani Tsuruushi," known as "Japan's oldest Tsuruushi cattle," has been preserved in Shingō Kamamura, Niimi City, Okayama Prefecture. Gomi Hirata has valued its rarity and has maintained its characteristics for over 50 years. The area is also known for raising beef cattle, with Chiya beef being particularly famous. Additionally, wild boar hunting is practiced, and wild boar meat is used as a topping for Niimi ramen. Restaurants in the area also serve dishes such as botan nabe (wild boar hot pot), inoshishi-don (wild boar rice bowl), and inoshishi curry.

The principle industries in modern Niimi are limestone quarrying, cement production, forestry, and tourism. Yamasa Company, Ltd., a producer of pachinko slot machines, is headquartered in the city. Farms in Niimi produce grapes, chestnuts, peaches, and Japanese pears. A black tea plantation is also being trialled here.

== Education ==
The city is served by Niimi Kōritsu Tanki Daigaku, known in English as Niimi College. Niimi has 17 public elementary schools and seven public junior high schools operated by the city government, and one public high school operated by the Okayama Prefectural Board of Education. There is also one private high school, and the prefecture also operates one special education school for the handicapped.

== Transportation ==
=== Railway ===
Niimi is an important railway center. The city is served by three JR West lines, and all meet at Niimi Station.

JR West (JR West) - Geibi Line

- Niimi - Nunohara - Bitchū Kōjiro - Sakane - Ichioka - Yagami - Nochi

JR West (JR West) - Kishin Line

- Osakabe - Tajibe - Iwayama - Niimi

JR West (JR West) - Hakubi Line

- Ikura - Ishiga - Niimi - Nunohara - Bitchū Kōjiro - Ashidachi - Niizato

=== Bus ===
- Niimi Municipal Bus (新見市営バス, Niimi Chōei Basu)
- Bihoku Bus Company, Ltd. (備北バス, Bihoku Basu)

=== Highway ===
- Chūgoku Expressway
- National Route 180
- National Route 182

== Sister cities ==
Niimi maintains the following sister cities.

- New Paltz, New York, United States since 1998.
- Sidney, British Columbia, Canada since 2008.
- Xinyang, People's Republic of China since 1992.

== Local attractions ==
Niimi is known for its limestone caves. They include:

- Ikura-do Cave
- Maki-do Cave
- Rashomon
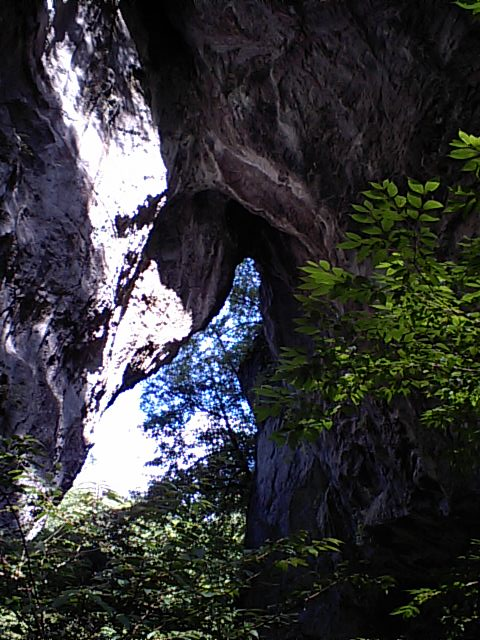
Rashomon Stone Arch Gate

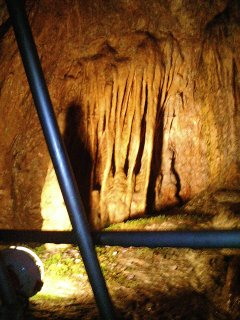
Ikurado Cave

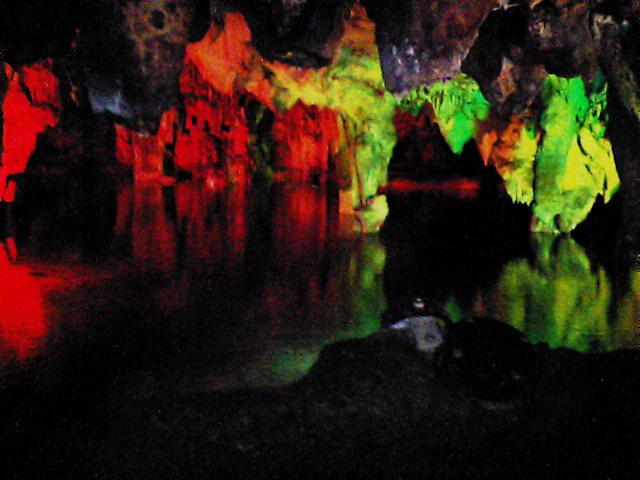
Makido Cave

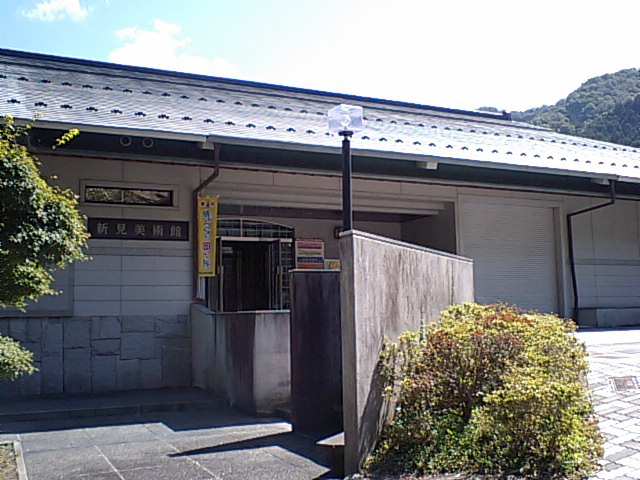
Niimi Museum

== Notable people ==
- Gen'ichi Katō, (1890 – 1979) Japanese doctor was once a candidate for the Nobel Prize in Physiology or Medicine.
