= Niimi Domain =

Administrative division in western Japan during the Edo period (1600-1871)

Niimi Domain 新見藩
- Domain of Japan
- 1697–1871
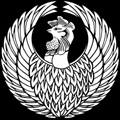
- Mon of the Seki clan
- Capital: Niimi Jin'ya
- Area
  - Coordinates: 34°59′11.18″N 133°28′12.84″E
- Historical era: Edo period
  - Established: 1697
  - Abolition of the han system: 1871
- Contained within
  - Province: Bitchū Province
- Today part of: Okayama Prefecture

Location of Niimi Jin'ya
Niimi Domain (Japan)

Niimi Domain (新見藩, Niimi-han) was a feudal domain under the Tokugawa shogunate of Edo period Japan, in Bitchū Province. It was centered around Niimi jin'ya in what is now the city of Niimi, Okayama Prefecture. It was ruled throughout its history by the Seki clan. Niimi Domain was dissolved in the abolition of the han system in 1871 and is now part of Okayama Prefecture.

== History ==
In 1697, following the attainder of the Mori clan of Tsuyama Domain, Mori Nagaharu, the sixth son of Mori Nagatsugu and daimyō of Miyagawa Domain, a sub-domain of Tsuyama Domain, changed his surname to "Seki" and was allowed to transfer to new domain in northern Bitchū Province. His nominal kokudaka was assessed as 18,000 koku; however, the actual kokudaka of his territory was less than 9,000 koku, which meant that the clan's finances were in arrears from the start. Seki Nagaharu built his jin'ya in the village of Niimi, was a distribution center for iron and rice, and opened a market to promote commerce. He and his descendants would rule the domain over nine generations and 174 years.

Seki Masatomi, the third daimyō worked on financial reforms to overcome the severe financial situation, and achieved some success. He also opened a han school, the Shiseikan, and encouraged the education of commoners. The fifth daimyō, Seki Naganobu, invited reformers from other domains as advisors, and to teach at the han school, notably the scholar Marukawa Shoin, who wrote a guidebook on model domain administration. However, by 1836, the domain revenues dropped as low as 3,000 koku, and financial reconstruction became an urgent task. The domain established monopolies on iron and Japanese paper in 1857. During the Bakumatsu period, the domain pledged fealty to the Imperial cause from an early date.

In 1871, Niimi Domain became Niimi Prefecture due to the abolition of the han system. Subsequently, it was incorporated into Okayama Prefecture. The site of Niimi jin'ya Is now occupied by Niimi Municipal Niimi High School. The Seki clan was granted the title of viscount in the kazoku peerage by the Meiji government. The current head of the family is Masaru Seki, and he participates in the daimyō procession festival held in Niimi every year.

== Holdings at the end of the Edo period ==
As with most domains in the han system, Niimi Domain consisted of several discontinuous territories calculated to provide the assigned kokudaka, based on periodic cadastral surveys and projected agricultural yields, g.

- Bitchū Province
  - 2 villages in Oda District
  - 16 villages in Aga District
  - 3 villages in Asakuchi District
  - 6 villages in Tetsuta District

== List of daimyō ==
#	Name	Tenure	Courtesy title	Court Rank	kokudaka
Seki clan, 1697-1871 (Tozama)
1	Seki Nagaharu (関長治)	1697 - 1725	Bizen-no-kami (備前守)	Junior 5th Rank, Lower Grade (従五位下)	18,000 koku
2	Seki Nagahiro (関長広)	1725 - 1732	Tajma-no-kami (但馬守)	Junior 5th Rank, Lower Grade (従五位下)	18,000 koku
3	Seki Masatomi (関政富)	1732 - 1760	Harima-no-kami (播磨守)	Junior 5th Rank, Lower Grade (従五位下)	18,000 koku
4	Seki Masatoki (関政辰)	1760 - 1774	-none-	-none-	18,000 koku
5	Seki Naganobu (関長誠)	1774 - 1795	Bizen-no-kami (備前守)	Junior 5th Rank, Lower Grade (従五位下)	18,000 koku
6	Seki Nagateru (関長輝)	1795 - 1819	Ukyō-no-suke (右京亮)	Junior 5th Rank, Lower Grade (従五位下)	18,000 koku
7	Seki Shigeakira (関成煥)	1819 - 1841	Ichi-no-kami (東市正)	Junior 5th Rank, Lower Grade (従五位下)	18,000 koku
8	Seki Nagamichi (関長道)	1841 - 1858	Bizen-no-kami (備前守)	Junior 5th Rank, Lower Grade (従五位下)	18,000 koku
9	Seki Nagakatsu (関長克)	1858 - 1871	Ise-no-kami (伊勢守)	Junior 5th Rank, Upper Grade (従五位上)	18,000 koku

== See also ==
- List of Han
- Abolition of the han system
