= Yagami Station =

Railway station in Niimi, Okayama Prefecture, Japan

Yagami Station 矢神駅
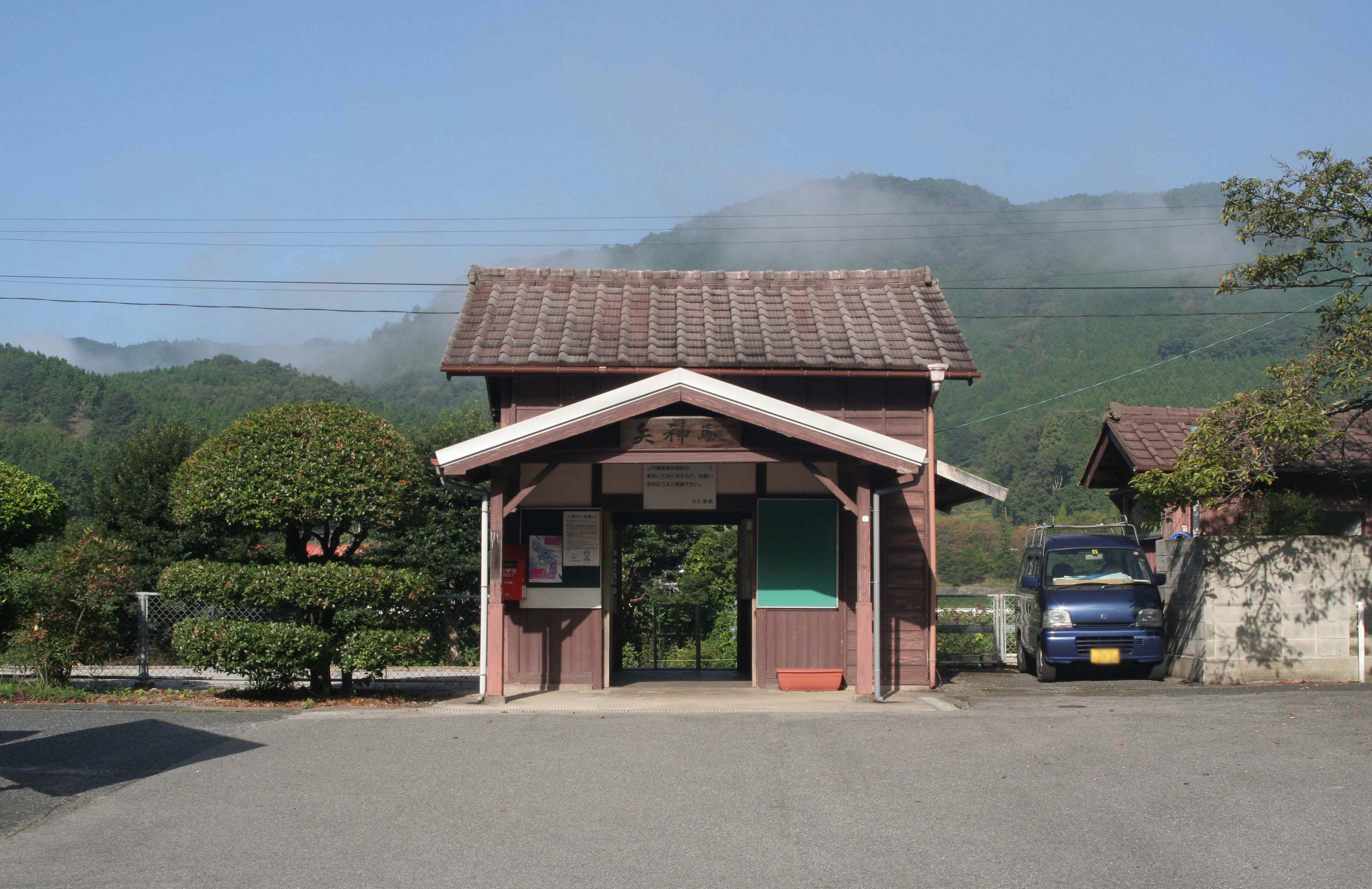
- Yagami Station, September 2007

General information
- Location: Yada, Tessei-chō, Niimi-shi, Okayama-ken 719-3701; Japan
- Coordinates: 34°56′36.25″N 133°19′58.12″E
- Operator: JR West
- Line: P Geibi Line
- Distance: 10.0 km (6.2 miles) from Bitchū-Kōjiro
- Platforms: 2 side platforms
- Tracks: 2

Other information
- Status: Unstaffed
- Website: Official website

History
- Opened: 10 February 1930

Passengers
- 2019: 2 daily
Location
- Location within Okayama Prefecture Location within Japan

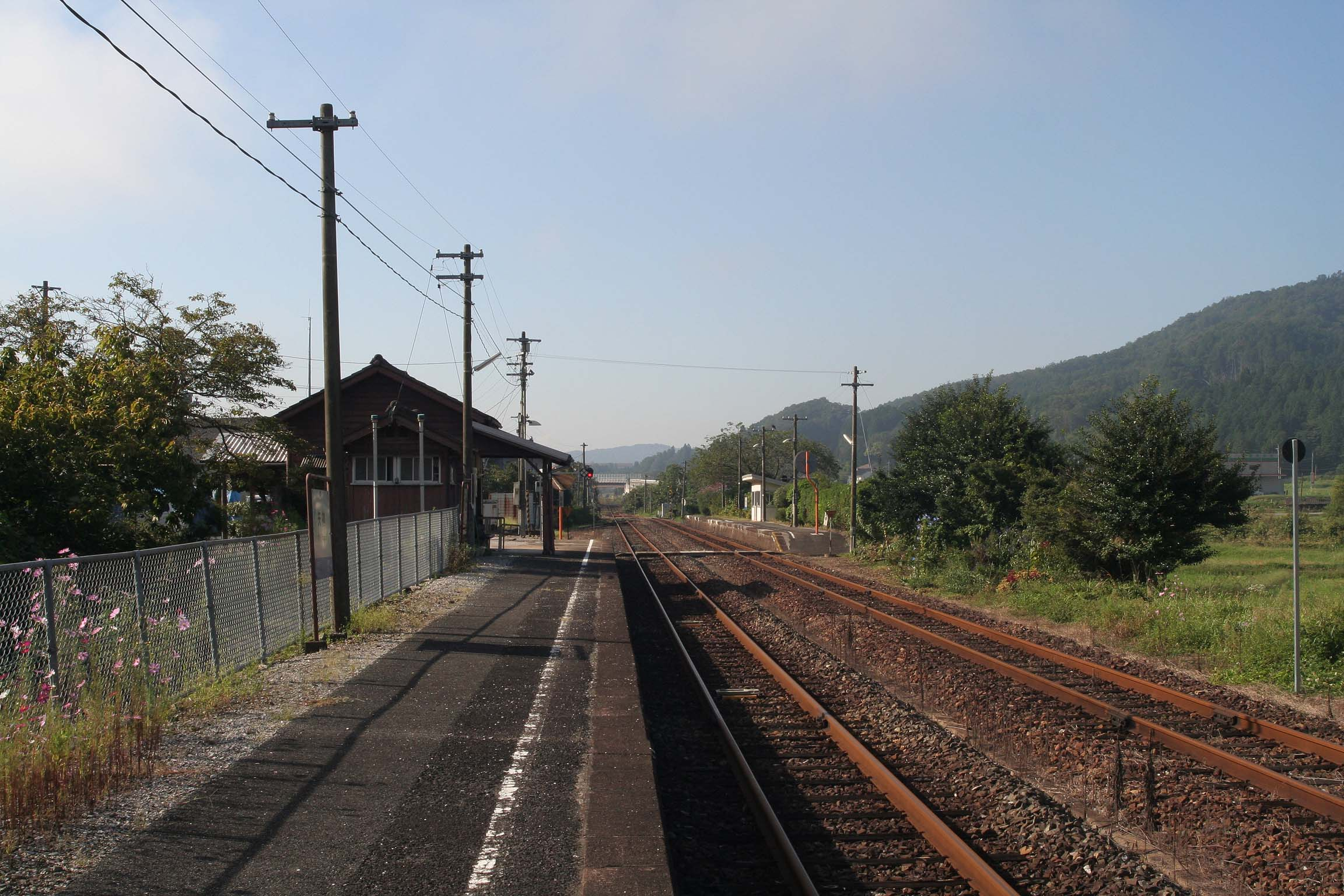
Platforms

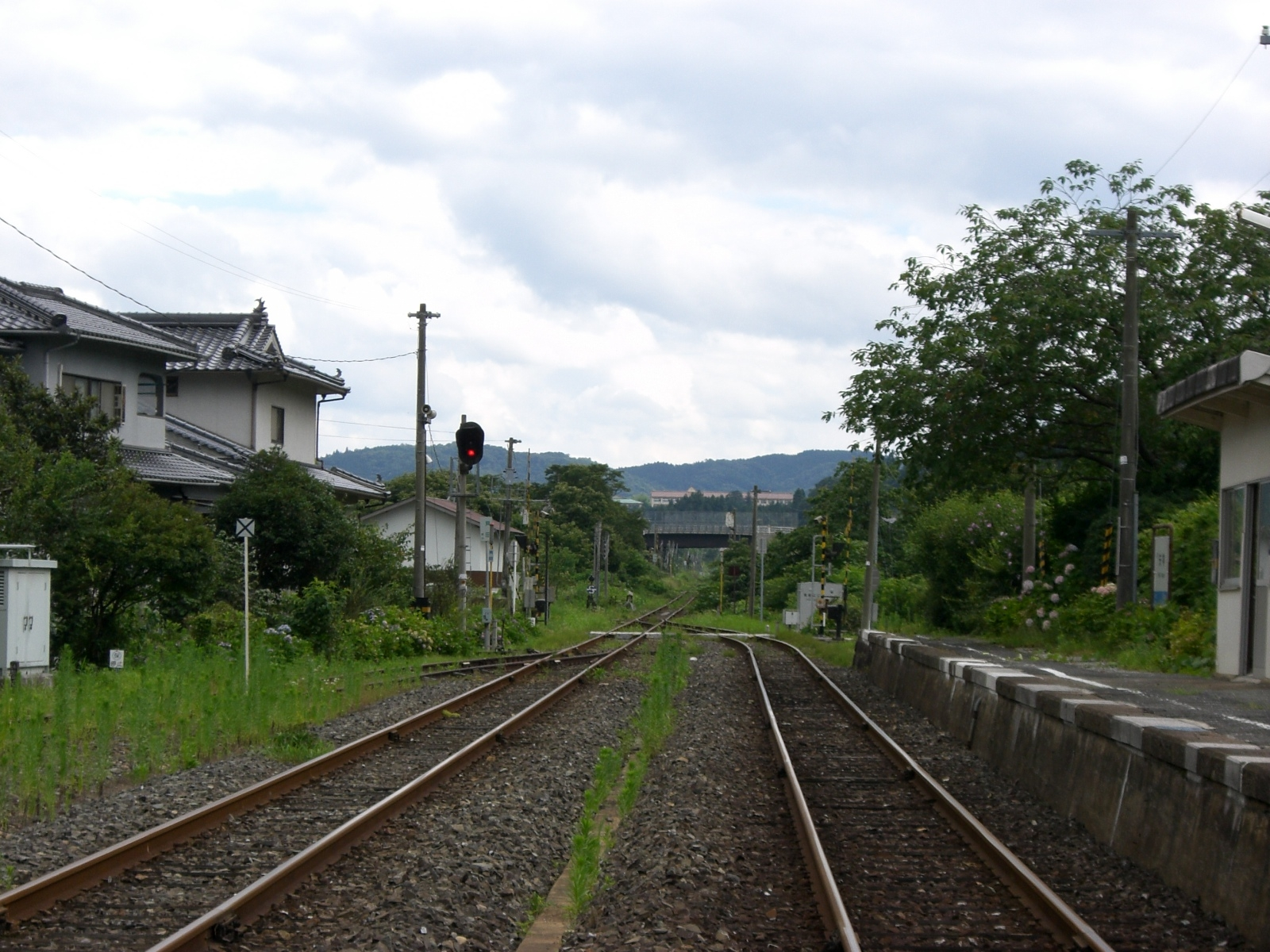
On the platform looking toward Tōjō Station

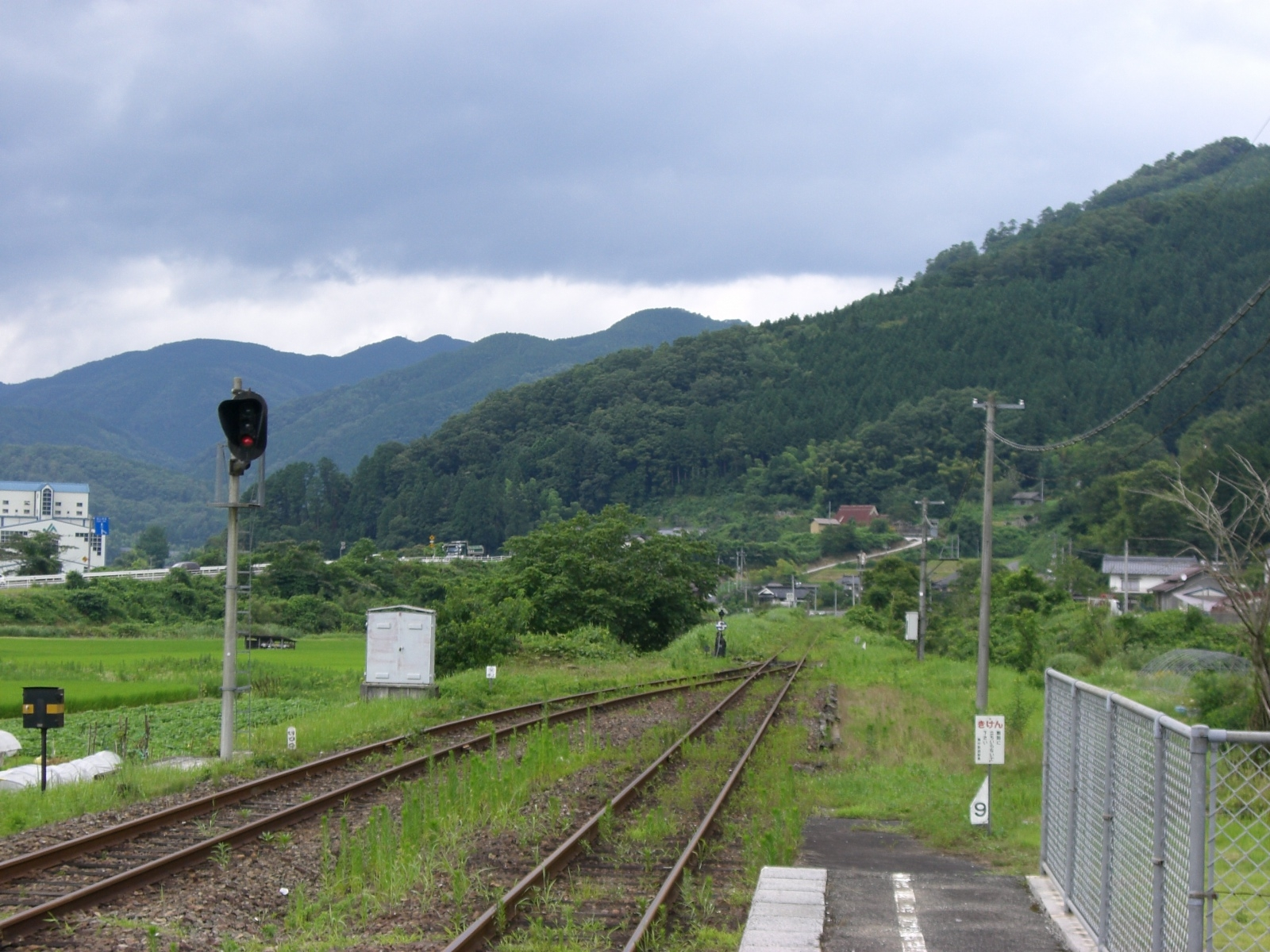
On the platform looking toward Nochi Station

Yagami Station (矢神駅, Yagami-eki) is a passenger railway station located in the city of Niimi, Okayama Prefecture, Japan. It is operated by the West Japan Railway Company (JR West). The name of the station is a combination of two characters from the names of two small towns which merged: the 矢 from Yada (矢田) and the 神 from Kamikōjiro (上神代).

== Lines ==
Yagami Station is served by the Geibi Line, and is located 10.0 kilometers from the terminus of the line at Bitchū-Kōjiro and 16.5 kilometers from Niimi.

== Station layout ==
The station consists of two staggered opposed ground-level side platforms, connected by a level crossing. In the 1990s, the office side of the station building was dismantled, leaving only the waiting room. The station is unattended.

=== Platforms ===
1	■ P Geibi Line	for Niimi
2	■ P Geibi Line	for Tōjō and Bingo-Ochiai

== Adjacent stations ==
«	Service	»
Geibi Line
Niimi	Rapid	Tōjō
Ichioka	-	Nochi

== History ==
Yagami Station was opened on February 10, 1930, with the creation of the Sanshin Line between Yagami Station and Bitchū Kōjiro Station. It became part of JR West in 1987 when Japan National Railways was privatized.

== Passenger statistics ==
In fiscal 2019, the station was used by an average of 13 passengers daily.

== Surrounding area ==
- Japan National Route 182

== See also ==
- List of railway stations in Japan
