= Tetta, Okayama =

Dissolved municipality in Okayama prefecture, Japan

Tetta (哲多町, Tetta-chō) was a town located in Atetsu District, Okayama Prefecture, Japan.

As of 2003, the town had an estimated population of 3,961 and a density of 36.89 persons per km^{2}. The total area was 107.37 km^{2}.

On March 31, 2005, Tetta, along with the towns of Ōsa, Shingō and Tessei (all from Atetsu District), was merged into the expanded city of Niimi.
