= Tessei, Okayama =

Dissolved municipality in Atetsu district, Okayama prefecture, Japan

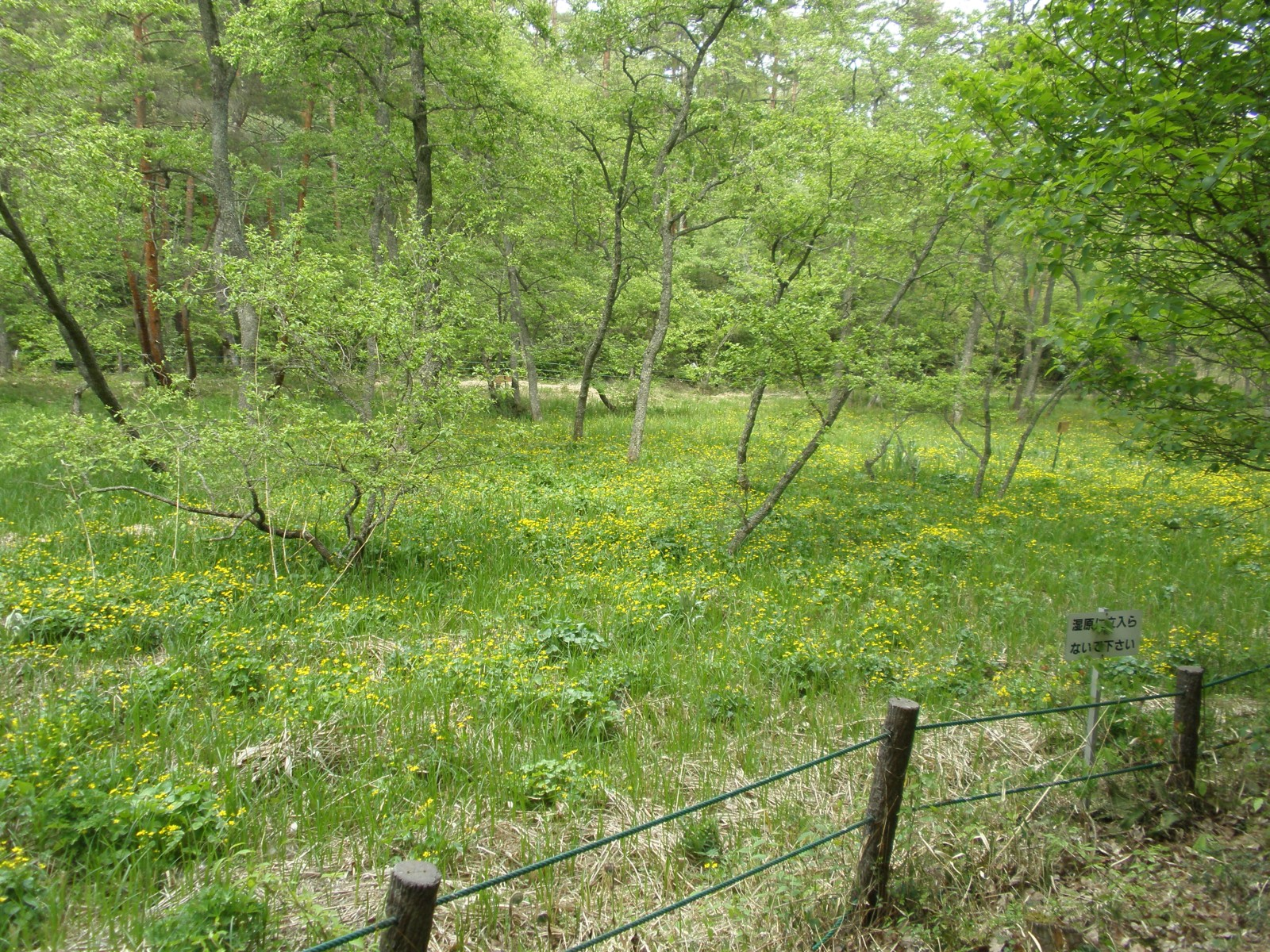
Koigakubo Marsh in Niimi, Okayama

Tessei (哲西町, Tessei-chō) was a town located in Atetsu District, Okayama Prefecture, Japan.

As of 2003, the town had an estimated population of 3,152 and a density of 41.32 persons per km ². The total area was 76.29 km ².

On March 31, 2005, Tessei, along with the towns of Ōsa, Shingō and Tetta (all from Atetsu District), was merged into the expanded city of Niimi.

The town is known for its nature reserve, Koigakubo Marsh, which was designated as a National Natural Monument.
