= Bingo-Yawata Station =

Railway station in Shōbara, Hiroshima Prefecture, Japan

Bingo-Yawata Station 備後八幡駅
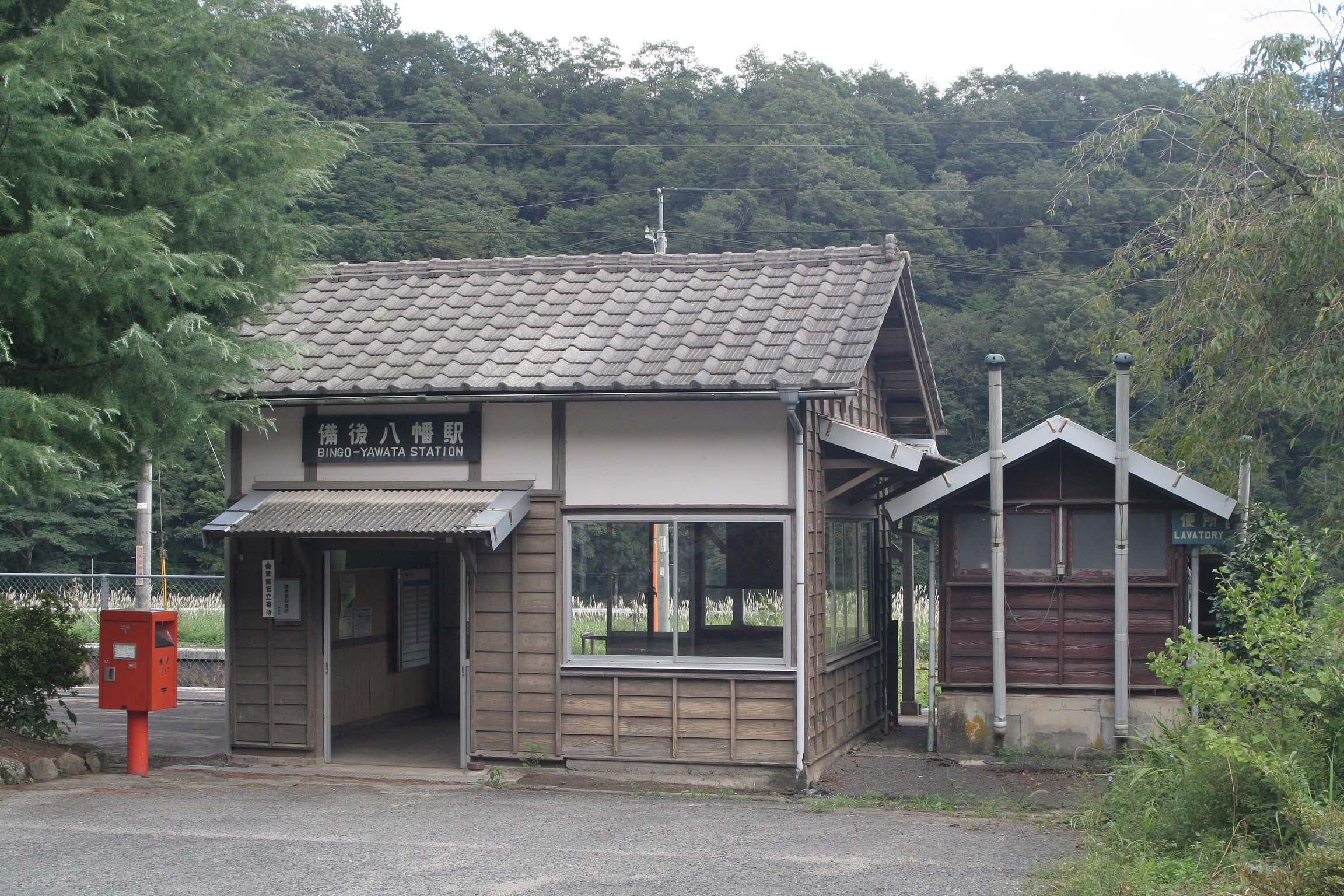
- Bingo-Yawata Station building in 2007

General information
- Location: 295-3 Suga, Tōjō-chō, Shōbara-shi, Hiroshima-ken 729-5452; Japan
- Coordinates: 34°56′17.49″N 133°13′55.51″E
- Operator: JR West
- Line: P Geibi Line
- Distance: 25.3 km (15.7 miles) from Bitchū-Kōjiro
- Platforms: 1 side platform
- Tracks: 1

Other information
- Status: Staffed
- Website: Official website

History
- Opened: December 20, 1935

Passengers
- 2019: 0 daily

Services
Preceding station	JR West	Following station
Uchina towards Hiroshima	Geibi Line Local	Tōjō towards Niimi
Location
- Location within Hiroshima Prefecture Location within Japan

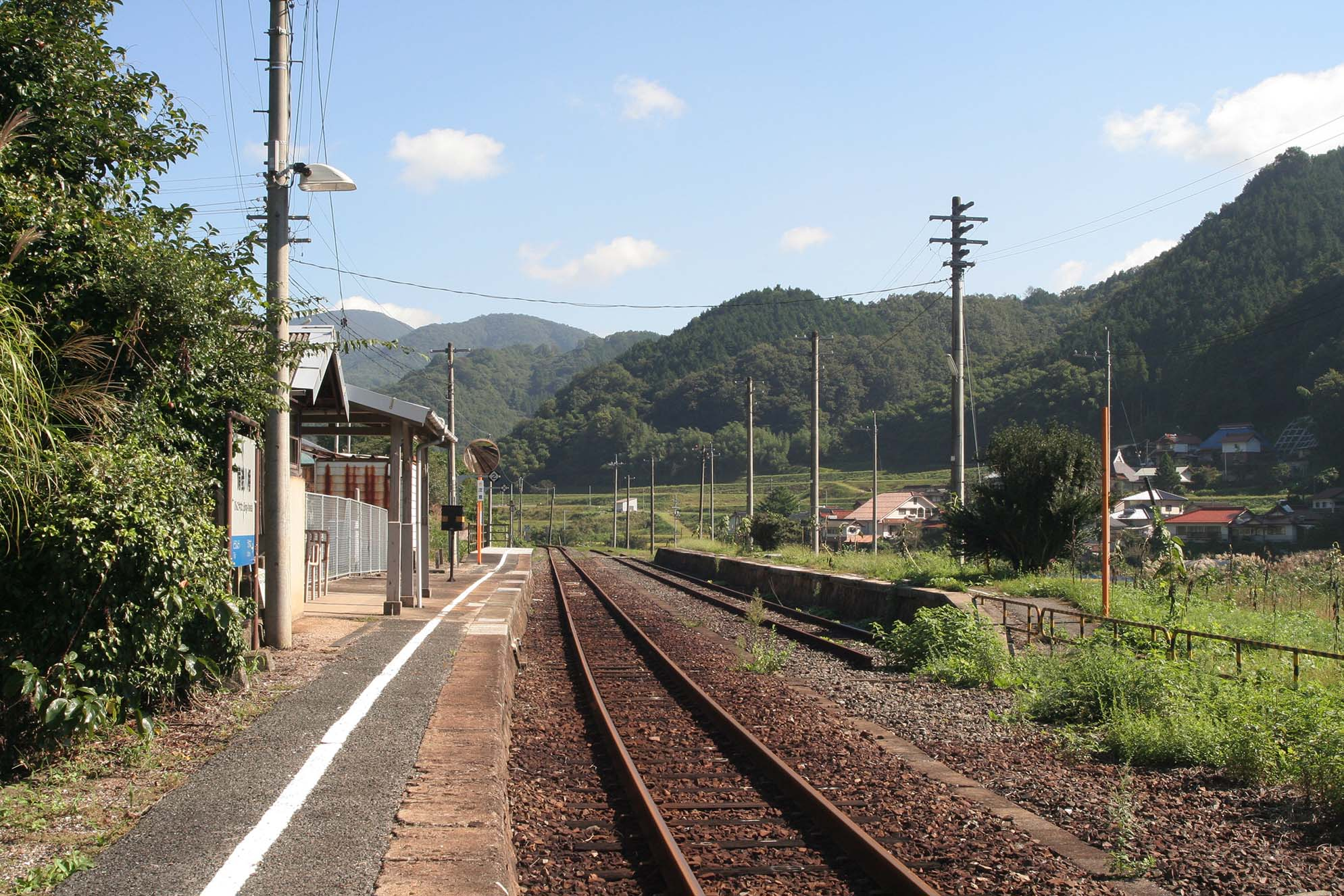
enclosure (2007)

Bingo-Yawata Station (備後八幡駅, Bingo-Yawata-eki) is a passenger railway station located in Suga, Tōjō-chō, in the city of Shōbara, Hiroshima Prefecture, Japan. It is operated by the West Japan Railway Company (JR West).

== Lines ==
Bingo-Yawata Station is served by the Geibi Line, and is located 25.3 kilometers from the terminus of the line at Bitchū-Kōjiro and 31.7 kilometers from Niimi.

== Station layout ==
The station consists of one ground-level side platform serving a single bi-directional track. Originally, it was a station with two opposite side platforms and two tracks, and on the side of the abolished platform, a rusty track remains separated from the main line. The station building was also demolished, leaving only the waiting room. A little further from the station is the wreckage of the railway bridge, which was once used to procure raw materials for Teikoku Iron & Steel Co., Ltd. In addition, the agricultural cooperative's rice storage remains, and there was formerly a freight side track, traces of which can still be seen within the station premises. The station is unattended. Tickets were sold at the nearby Suga Post Office until 2012.

== History ==
Bingo-Yawata Station was opened on December 20, 1935. It became part of JR West on April 1, 1987 when Japan National Railways was privatized.

== Passenger statistics ==
In fiscal 2019, the station was used by an average of 0 passengers daily.

== Surrounding area ==
- Hiroshima Prefectural Road 237 Bingo Hachiman Station Line
- Hiroshima Prefectural Road No. 450 Uchibori Bingo Hachiman Station Line

== See also ==
- List of railway stations in Japan
