= Maki-dō =

Cave in Okayama Prefecture, Japan

Makidō
- 満奇洞
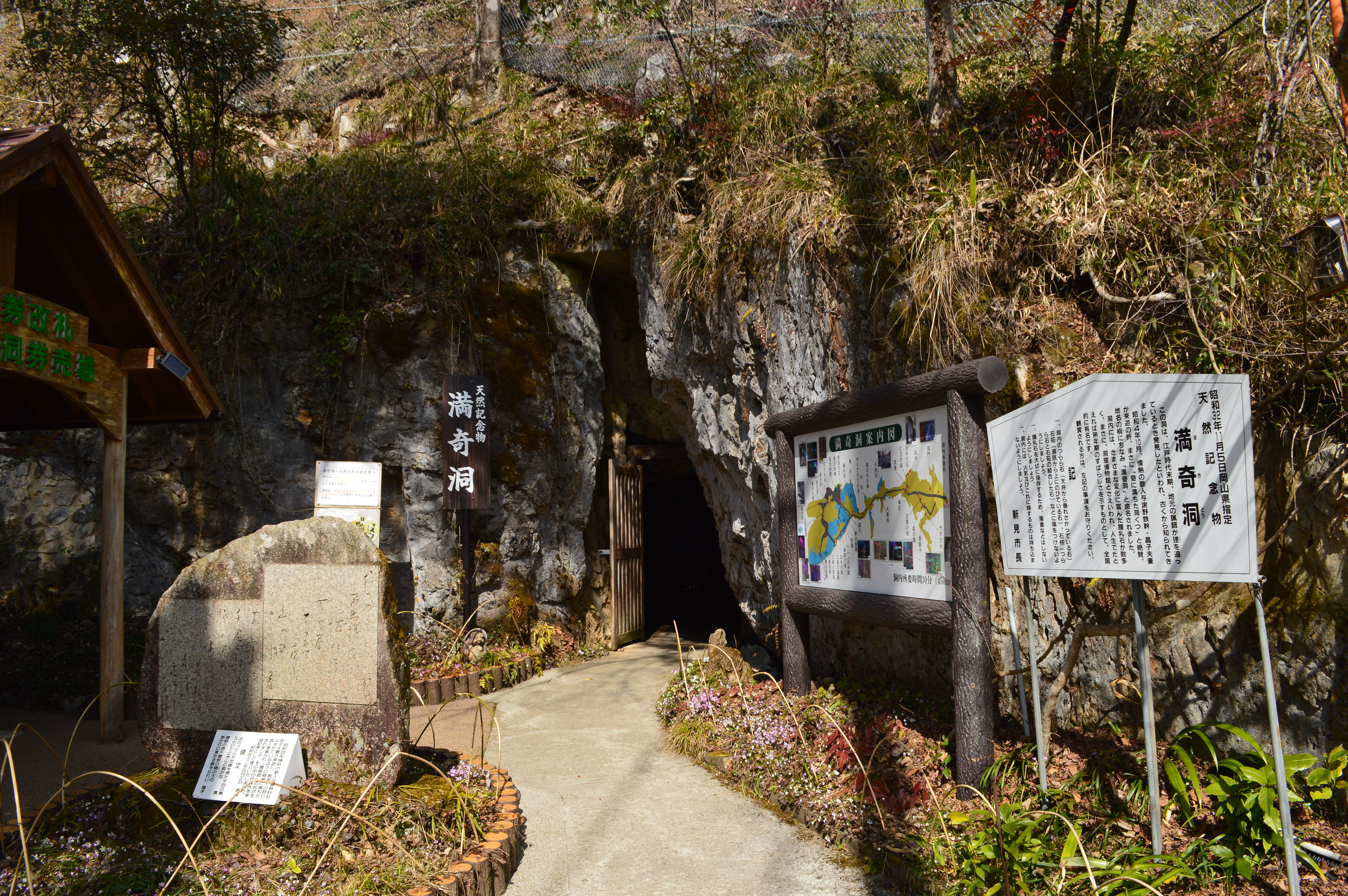
- Makidō entrance

- Location within Okayama Prefecture
- Location: Niimi, Okayama, Japan
- Coordinates: 34°58′18.3″N 133°35′0.3″E
- Length: 450 meters
- Geology: limestone
- Access: public
- Show cave opened: 1967

Makidō (満奇洞) is one of many limestone caves located in the city of Niimi, in northwestern Okayama Prefecture, Japan.

The cave is said to have been accidentally discovered by a hunter in the Edo Period. It approximately 450 meters in length with a relatively flat elevation. It contains numerous stalactites and a large underground lake. The cave was popularized by the poets Tekkan Yosano and Akiko Yosano in 1929. It was designated an Okayama Prefectural Natural Monument in 1957 and was opened as a show cave. LED lighting was installed in 2015.

The cave was used as a filming location for the 1977 movie Yatsuhakamura.

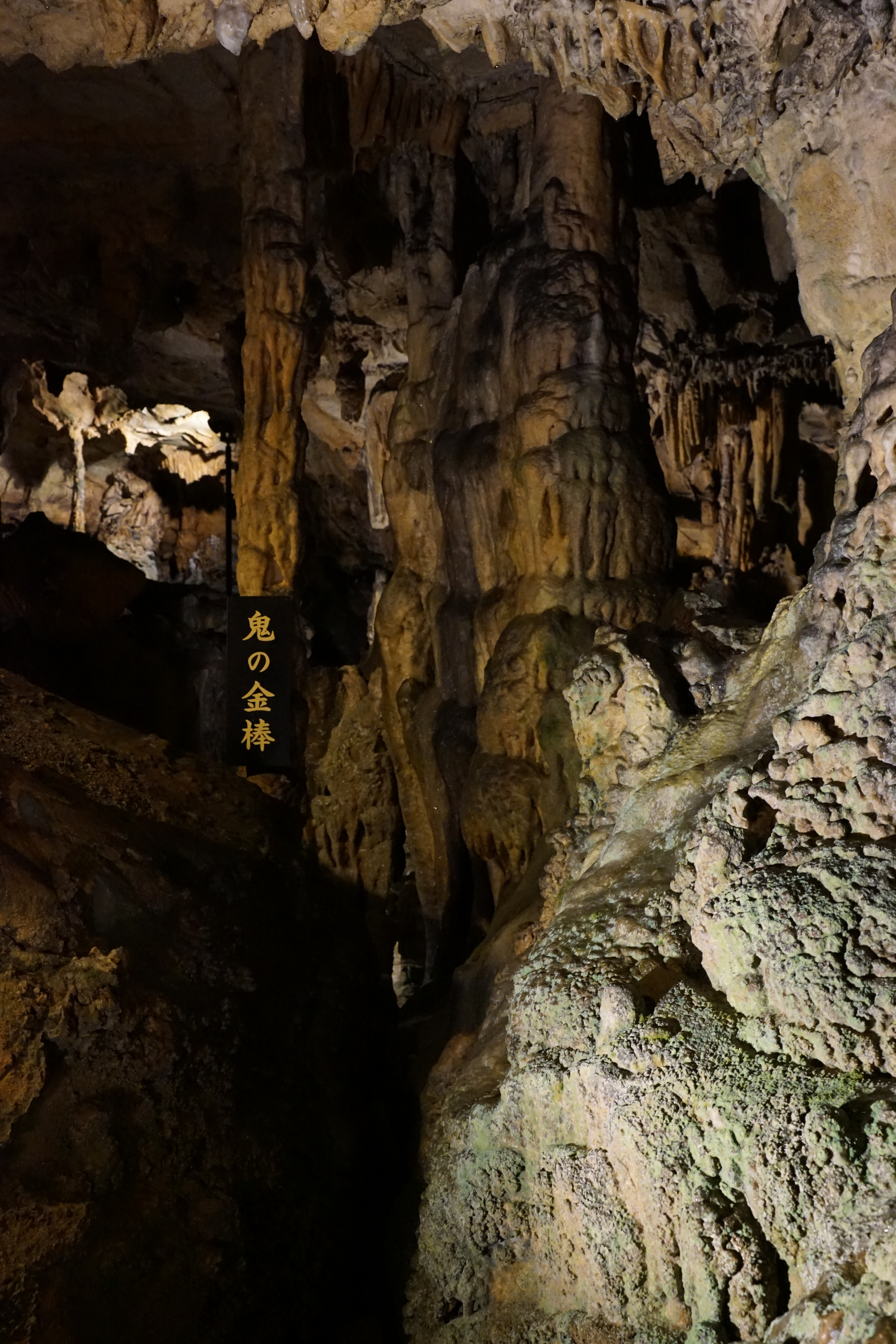

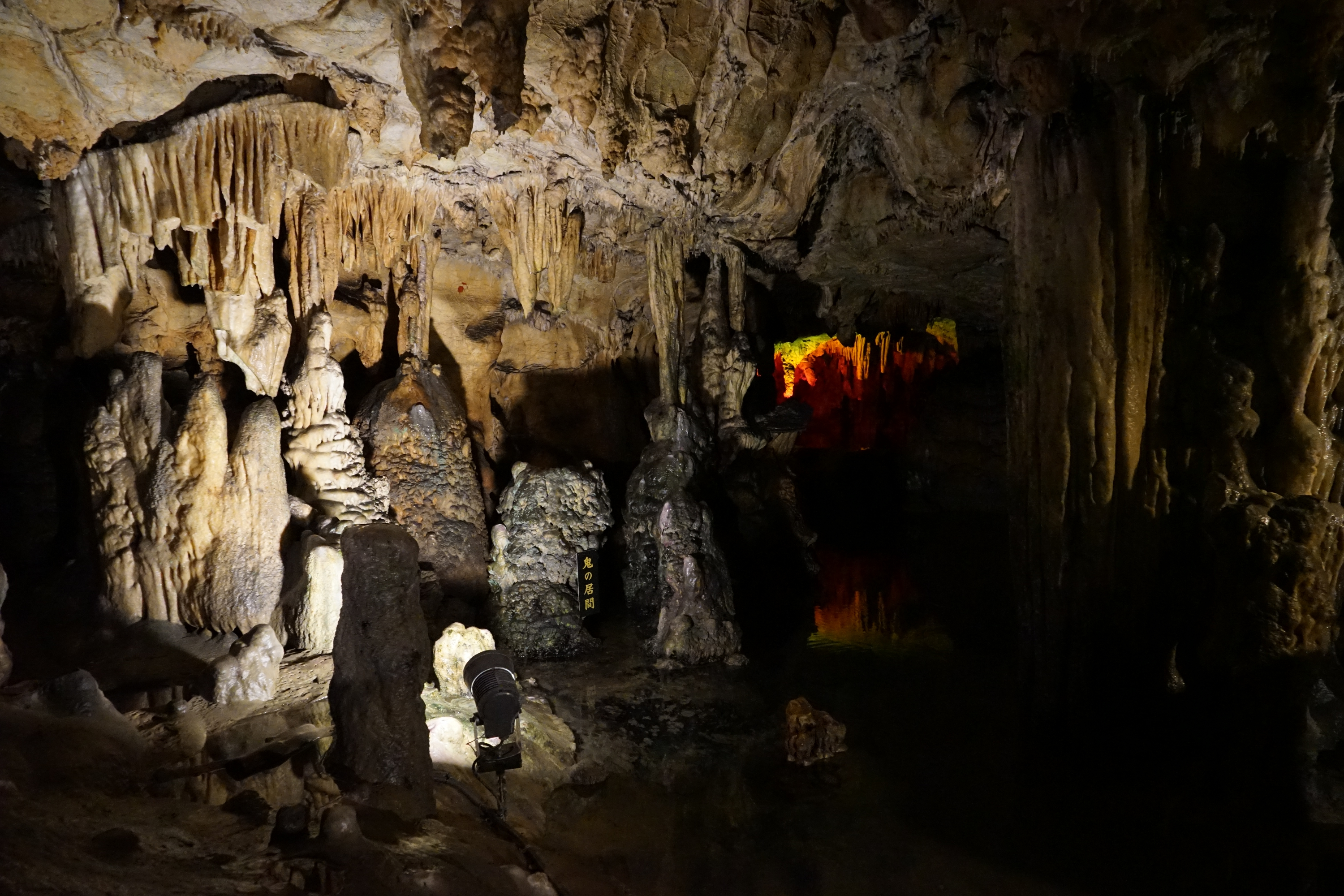

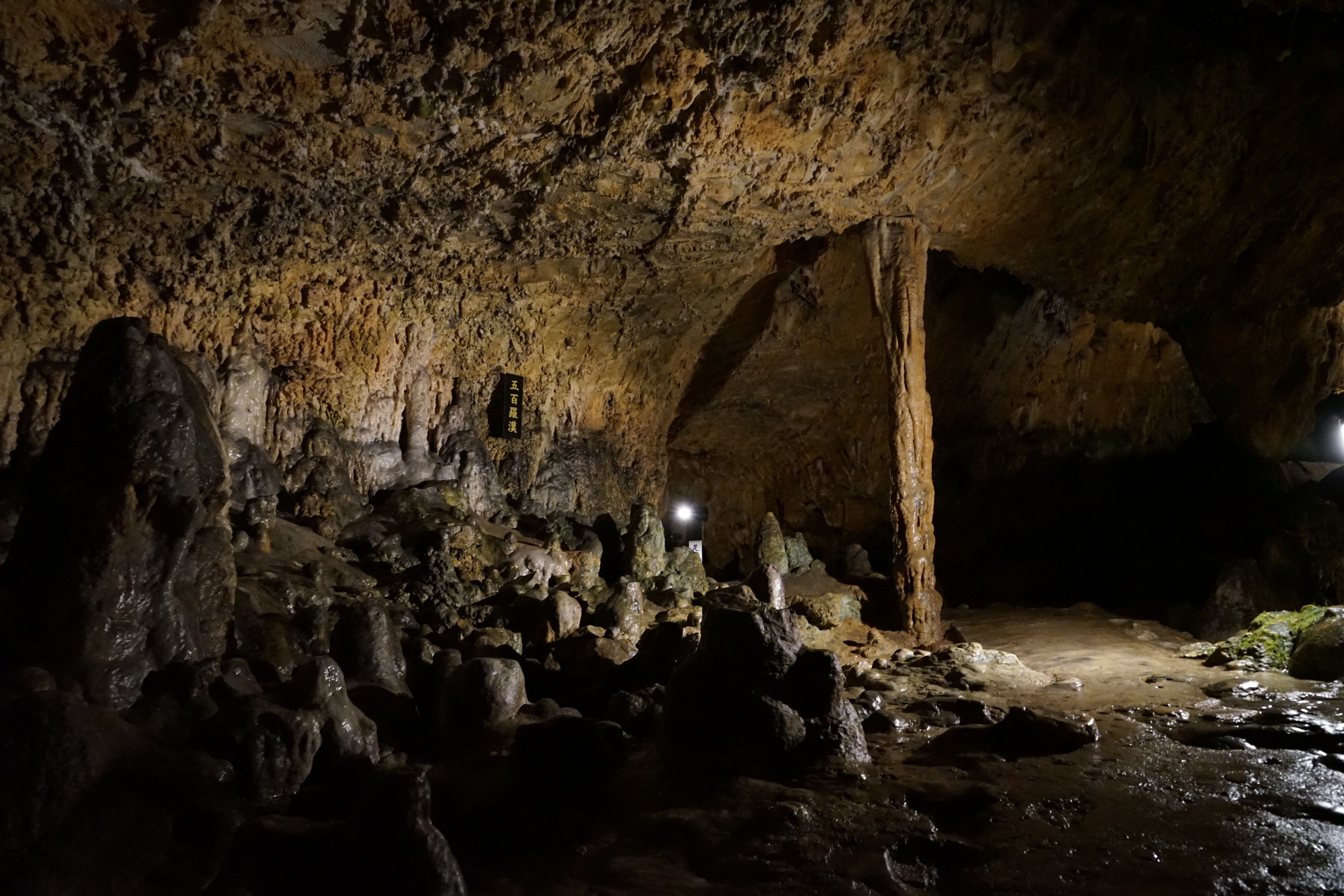

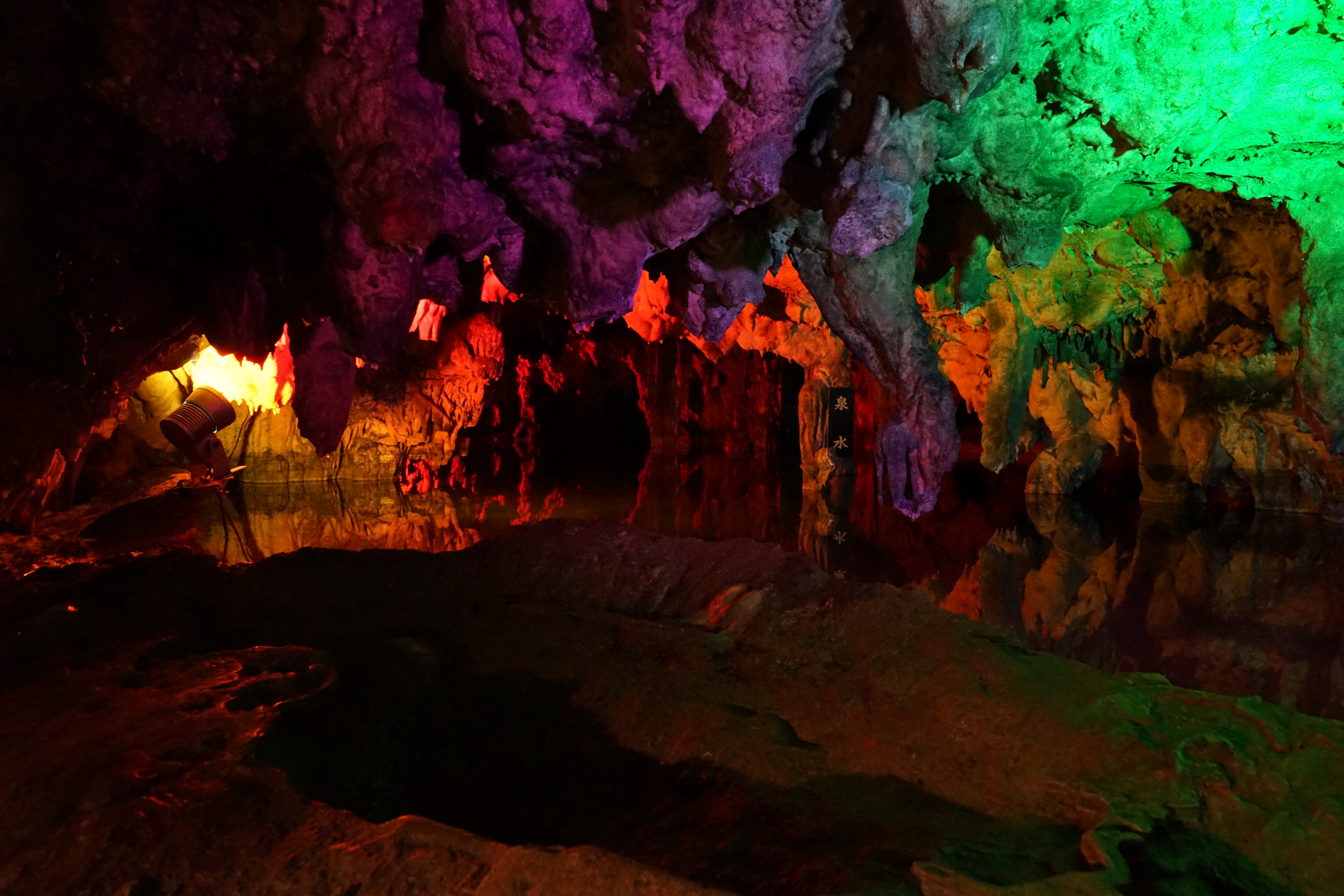

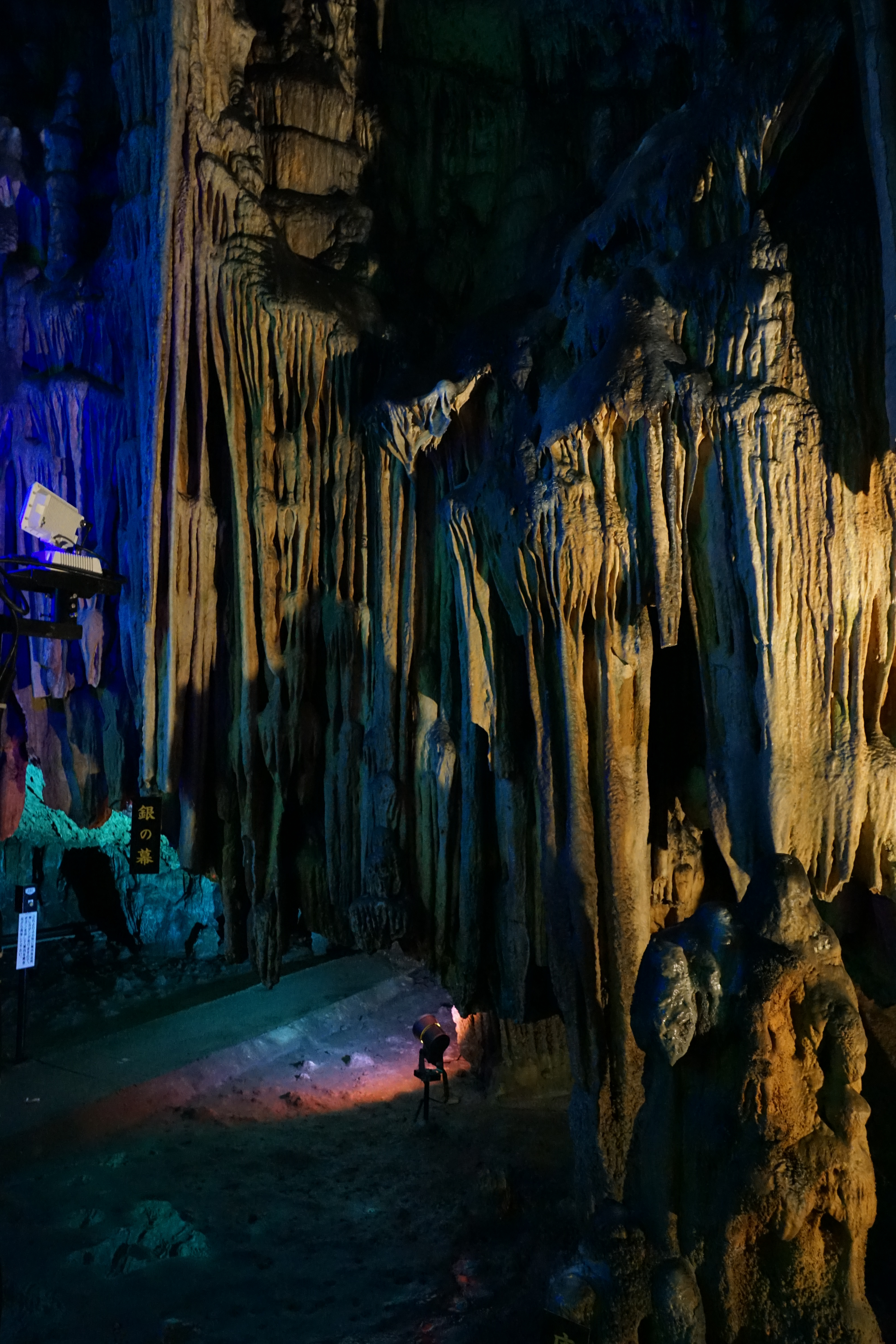

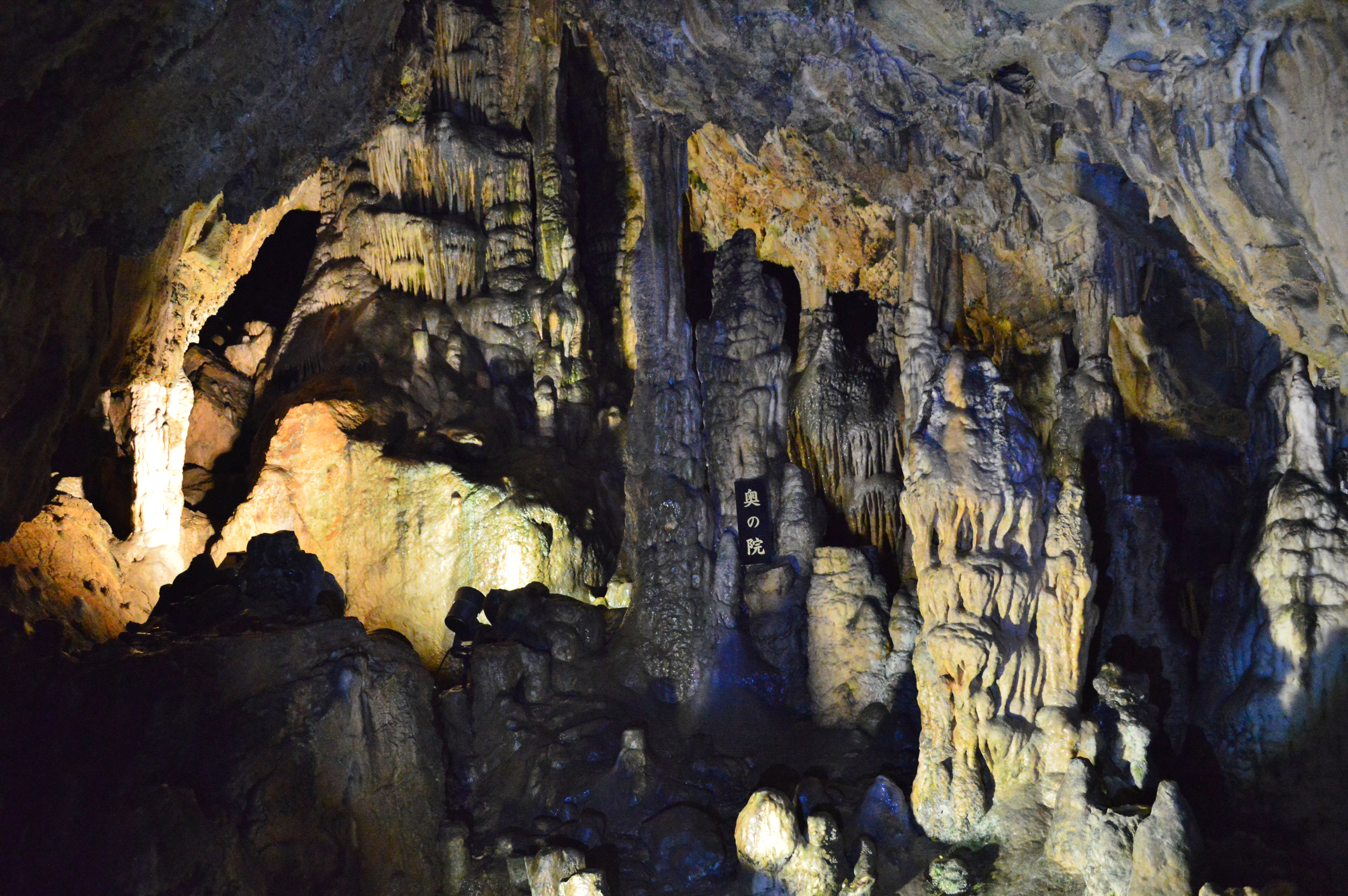

== Access ==
The immediate area is only accessible by car or bus, with a short but steep climb to the entrance. It is 30 minutes from the 313 National Highway. Buses leave from JR West Ikura Station and take 38 minutes.
