= Japan National Route 182 =

Road in Japan

National Route 182
- 国道182号
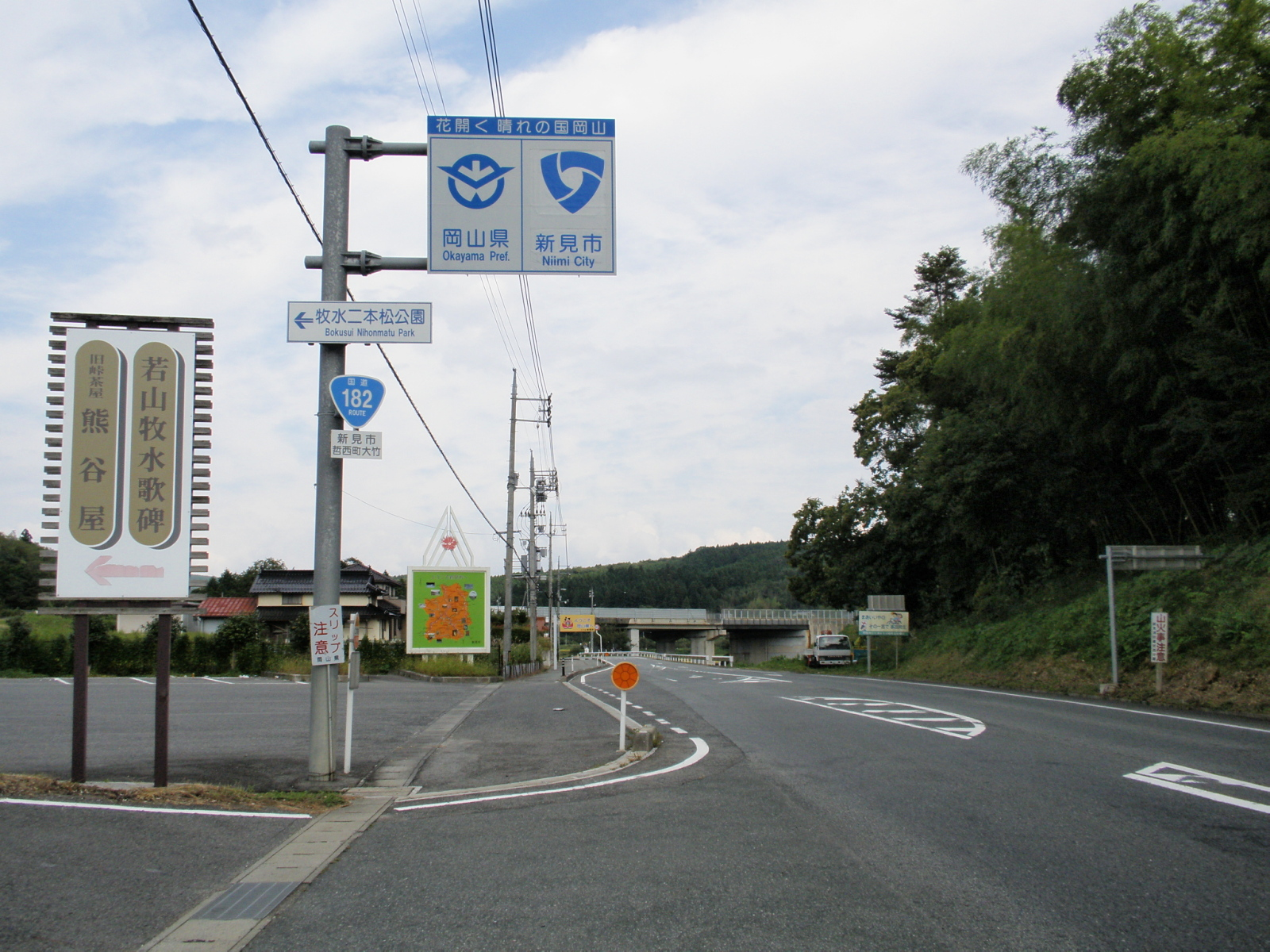

Route information
- Length: 79.7 km (49.5 mi)
- Existed: 1 April 1963–present

Major junctions
- North end: National Route 180 in Niimi
- South end: National Route 2 in Fukuyama

Location
- Country: Japan

Highway system
- National highways of Japan; Expressways of Japan
← National Route 181	→ National Route 183

National Route 182 is a national highway of Japan connecting Niimi and Fukuyama in Japan, with a total length of 79.7 km (49.52 mi).

== History ==
Route 182 was originally designated on 18 May 1953 from Hiroshima to Matsue. This was redesignated as Route 54 on 1 April 1963.
