= List of dams in Tottori Prefecture =

List of dams

The following is a list of dams in Tottori Prefecture, Japan.

== List ==
Name	Location	Started	Opened	Height	Length	Image	DiJ number
Asanabe Dam		1989	2004	45 m (148 ft)	150 m (490 ft)		3046
Ikenotani Tameike Dam			1923	16 m (52 ft)	78 m (256 ft)		1669
Kasyo Dam		1971	1988	46.4 m (152 ft)	174 m (571 ft)		1685
Kawagawa No.2 Dam			1993	17 m (56 ft)	46 m (151 ft)		
Kodamata Dam		1977	2006	50 m (160 ft)	347 m (1,138 ft)		1689
Matanoagawa Dam		1978	1984	69.3 m (227 ft)			1686
Misasa Dam		1956	1958	15 m (49 ft)	75.2 m (247 ft)		1679
Mitaki Dam			1936	23.8 m (78 ft)	82.5 m (271 ft)		1673
Momodani Dam		1969	1973	18 m (59 ft)	79 m (259 ft)		1683
Myogadani Dam		1958	1960	40 m (130 ft)	124.5 m (408 ft)		1680
Nakatsu Dam		1954	1957	35 m (115 ft)	96 m (315 ft)		1678
Nishitakao Dam		1979	1992	46.2 m (152 ft)	237 m (778 ft)		1690
Ohkamidani Tameike Dam			1973	27.2 m (89 ft)	255.5 m (838 ft)		1671
Omiya Dam			1940	16.8 m (55 ft)	68.5 m (225 ft)		1674
Sagarikaya Dam			2001	55.5 m (182 ft)	650 m (2,130 ft)		1687
Sajigawa Dam		1967	1971	46.5 m (153 ft)	105 m (344 ft)		1682
Sakura Tameike Dam			1973	36.6 m (120 ft)	115 m (377 ft)		1684
Senjozan Dam		1979	2003	43.9 m (144 ft)	232.7 m (763 ft)		1688
Sugesawa Dam				73.5 m (241 ft)			1681
Tetsuzan-ike Dam			1940	19 m (62 ft)	78.5 m (258 ft)		1675
Togo Dam		1991	2003	39.5 m (130 ft)	227 m (745 ft)		3132
Tono Dam		1985	2011	75 m (246 ft)	294 m (965 ft)		2931
Tsubakidani Tameike Dam			1890	15 m (49 ft)	90 m (300 ft)		1663
Yokotani Tameike Dam			1952	16.7 m (55 ft)	118.6 m (389 ft)		1677

== See also ==
- Media related to Dams in Tottori prefecture at Wikimedia Commons
