= List of dams in Okayama Prefecture =

The following is a list of dams in Okayama Prefecture, Japan.

== List ==
Name	Location	Opened	Height (meters)	Image
Abekura Dam				
Aono Dam			20	
Asahikawa Dam			45	
Asahigawa No.2 Dam				
Chiaraiike Dam			15	
Chiya Dam			97.5	
Doyo Dam		1986	86.7	
Hattojikawa Dam			44	
Higasa Dam				
Hiyama Dam			25.4	
Hokubo Dam		1980	35.3	
Hoshida No.2 Dam			42.6	
Kagami Dam			39	
Kawahira Dam			38.5	
Kawakami Dam			24	
Komoto Dam			60	
Kuga Dam			36.5	
Kurodani Dam			30	
Kurodori Dam			15.5	
Kurogi Dam				
Makidani Dam			45	
Meiji Dam		1993	33.4	
Mimurogawa Dam			74.5	
Nagahara Dam			27	
Narai Dam			38.2	
Narutaki Dam			34	
Nishihara Dam			46.1	
Ochiai Dam			35.7	
Onbara Dam			24	
Ongi Dam			30.8	
Onigatake Dam			39	
Osa Dam			43.7	
Osakabegawa Dam			67.2	
Otake Dam			26.9	
Shin-Nariwagawa Dam			103	
Tabara Dam			41	
Takasegawa Dam			67	
Taketani Dam			38	
Takimiya Dam				
Takiyama Dam			33.2	
Tomata Dam			74	
Tsugawa Dam			76	
Yamate Dam			24	
Yubara Dam			73.5	

== See also ==
- Media related to Dams in Okayama prefecture at Wikimedia Commons
