= Chiya =

Chiya may refer to:

- Chiya (Urara Meirocho), a character in the manga series Urara Meirocho
- Chiya Dam, a dam in Okayama Prefecture, Japan
- Toriko Chiya, Japanese manga artist

== People with the given name ==
- Chiya Fujino (藤野 千夜, born 1962), Japanese writer

== See also ==
- Hiyya (disambiguation)
