= Togo Dam =

Togo Dam may refer to:

- Togo Dam (Hokkaido)
- Togo Dam (Tottori)
