= Matanoagawa Dam =

Dam in Kōfu, Japan

Matanogawa Dam
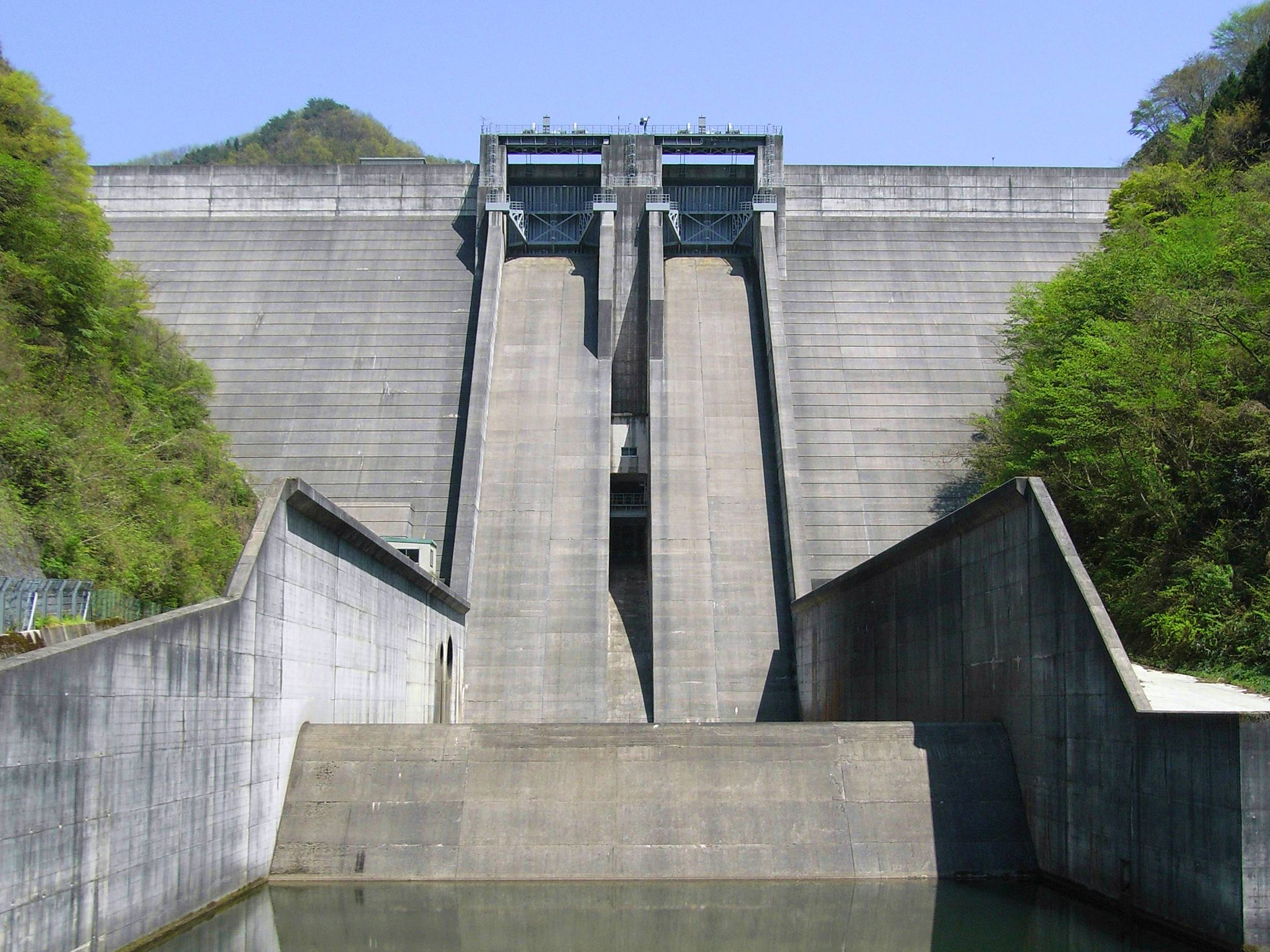

- Location within Japan
- Country: Japan
- Location: Kōfu
- Coordinates: 35°14′44″N 133°29′30″E
- Status: Operational
- Construction began: 1978
- Opening date: 1984
- Owner: Chugoku Electric Power Company

Dam and spillways
- Type of dam: Concrete gravity
- Impounds: Hino River tributary
- Height: 69.3 m (227 ft)
- Length: 185 m (607 ft)
- Dam volume: 165,000 m^{3} (216,000 cu yd)

Reservoir
- Total capacity: 7,940,000 m^{3} (6,440 acre⋅ft)
- Active capacity: 6,700,000 m^{3} (5,400 acre⋅ft)
- Catchment area: 48.9 km^{2} (18.9 mi^{2})
- Surface area: 41 ha (100 acres)

Power Station
- Commission date: 1992-1996
- Turbines: 4 x 300 MW (400,000 hp) Francis pump-turbines
- Installed capacity: 1,200 MW (1,600,000 hp)

The Matanogawa Dam (俣野川ダム) is a concrete gravity dam on a tributary of the Hino River located 2.3 km (1 mi) south of Kōfu in Tottori Prefecture, Japan. Construction on the dam began in 1978 and was complete in 1984. The primary purpose of the dam is hydroelectric generation, and it creates the lower reservoir for the Matanogawa Pumped Storage Power Station (俣野川発電所). It is 69.3 metres (227 ft) tall and creates a reservoir with a 7,940,000-cubic-metre (6,440 acre⋅ft) storage capacity. The power station is located on the southern bank of the reservoir and contains four 300-megawatt Francis pump-turbine-generators. The upper reservoir for the pumped-storage scheme is created by the Doyo Dam located 6 kilometres (3.7 mi) to the southeast in Okayama Prefecture. To generate power, water from the Doyo Dam is sent to the power station, used to generate electricity, and then discharged into the Matanogawa Reservoir. This occurs when energy demand is high. When it is low, water is pumped back up to the Doyo Dam, storing energy. The same pump-generators that pump the water to Doyo reverse and generate electricity when it is sent back down. The first generator was operational in 1992 and the last in 1996.

== See also ==
- List of pumped-storage hydroelectric power stations
- List of power stations in Japan
