= Kurodori Dam =

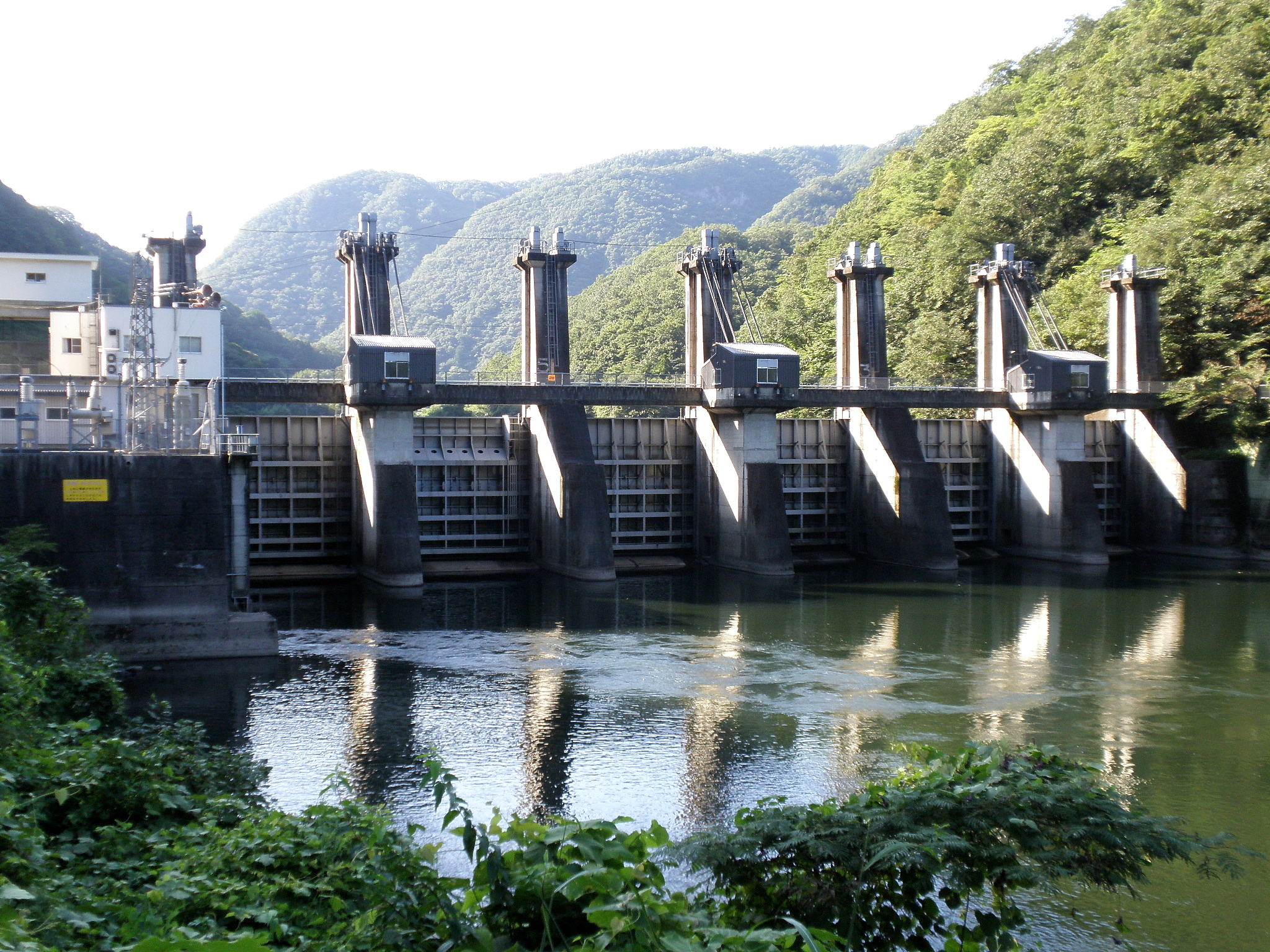

- Location within Japan
- Location: Takahashi, Okayama, Japan
- Coordinates: 34°47′14″N 133°26′58″E

Kurodori Dam (黒鳥ダム, Kurodori damu) is a dam on the Nariwa River in Takahashi, Okayama Prefecture, Japan, completed in 1968.
