= Hokubō Dam =

Coordinates: 35°0′2.3″N 133°35′58.3″E

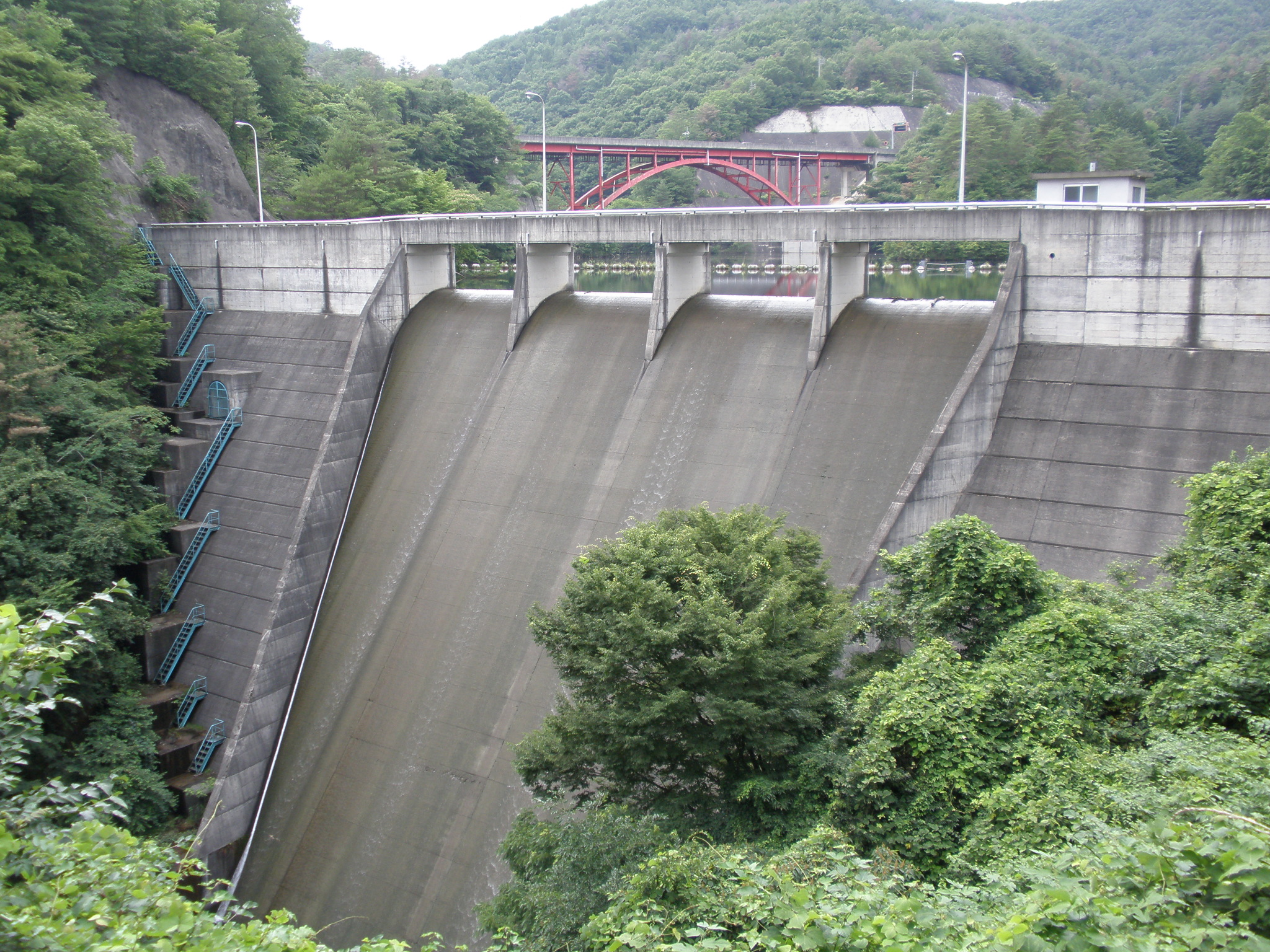
- Interactive map of Hokubō Dam
- Location: Maniwa, Okayama, Japan; Niimi, Okayama, Japan
- Construction began: 1972
- Opening date: 1980

Dam and spillways
- Type of dam: Concrete gravity dam
- Height: 35.3 m (116 ft)
- Length: 94 m (308 ft)
- Dam volume: 33,000 m^{3}

Reservoir
- Total capacity: 1,140,000 m^{3}
- Catchment area: 6.2 km^{2}
- Surface area: 9 ha

Hokubō Dam (北房ダム, Hokubō damu) is a dam in Okayama Prefecture, Japan. It is located on the border between the cities of Maniwa and Niimi, and it is actually situated between the eastbound and westbound lanes of the Chūgoku Expressway. The dam was completed in 1980.
