= Ohmiya Dam =

Dam in Tottori Prefecture, Japan

- Location within Japan
- Location: Tottori Prefecture, Japan
- Coordinates: 35°13′38″N 133°18′07″E
- Opening date: 1940

Dam and spillways
- Height: 16.8 m (55 ft)
- Length: 68.5 m (225 ft)

Reservoir
- Total capacity: 495,000 m^{3} (17,500,000 cu ft)
- Catchment area: 64.9 km^{2} (25.1 sq mi)
- Surface area: 11 hectares (27 acres)

Ohmiya Dam is a gravity dam located in Tottori prefecture in Japan. The dam is used for power production. The catchment area of the dam is 64.9 km^{2}. The dam impounds about 11 ha of land when full and can store 495 thousand cubic meters of water. The construction of the dam was completed in 1940.
