= Osa Dam =

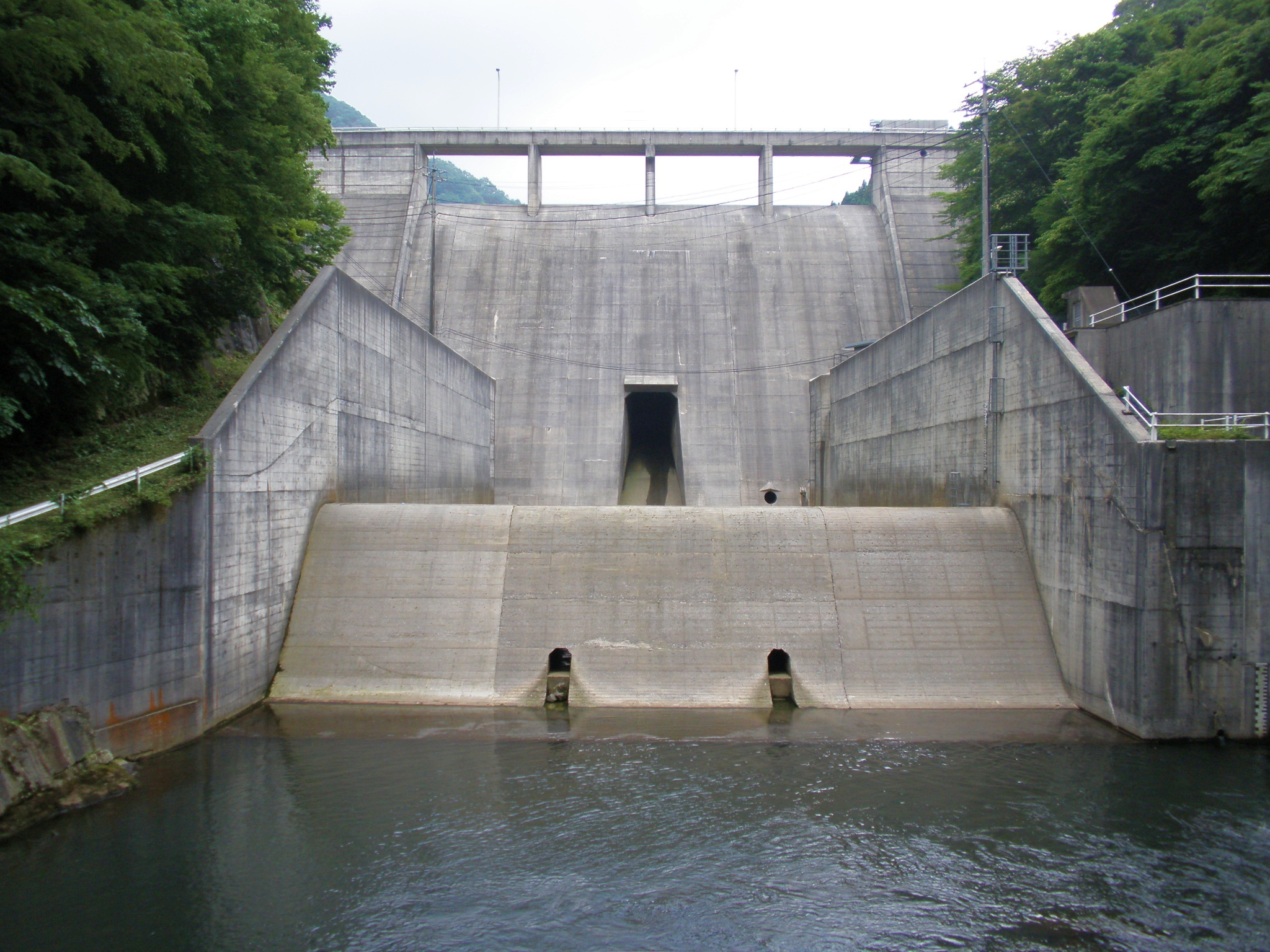
- Interactive map of Osa Dam
- Location: Okayama Prefecture, Japan
- Coordinates: 35°07′08″N 133°32′59″E

Osa Dam (Japanese: 大佐ダム) is a dam in the Okayama Prefecture, Japan, completed in 1981. It is managed by the prefecture's Ministry of Agriculture, Forestry and Fisheries.
