= Sagarikaya Dam =

Dam in Tottori Prefecture, Japan

- Location within Japan
- Location: Tottori Prefecture, Japan
- Coordinates: 35°17′36″N 133°33′11″E
- Construction began: 1972
- Opening date: 2001

Dam and spillways
- Height: 55.5 m (182 ft)
- Length: 650 m (2,130 ft)

Reservoir
- Total capacity: 3,860,000 m^{3} (136,000,000 cu ft)
- Catchment area: 13 km^{2} (5.0 sq mi)
- Surface area: 24 hectares (59 acres)

Sagarikaya Dam is a gravity dam located in Tottori prefecture in Japan. The dam is used for irrigation and recreation. The catchment area of the dam is 13 km^{2}. The dam impounds about 24 ha of land when full and can store 3860 thousand cubic meters of water. The construction of the dam was completed in 2001.
