= Ikenotani Tameike =

Dam in Tottori Prefecture, Japan

Ikenotani Tameike Dam
- Location within Japan
- Interactive map of Ikenotani Tameike Dam
- Location: Tottori Prefecture, Japan
- Coordinates: 35°23′25″N 133°46′23″E
- Opening date: 1923

Dam and spillways
- Height: 16 m (52 ft)
- Length: 78 m (256 ft)

Reservoir
- Total capacity: 616 thousand cubic meters
- Catchment area: sq. km
- Surface area: 8 hectares

Ikenotani Tameike Dam is an earthfill dam located in Tottori prefecture in Japan. The dam is used for irrigation. The catchment area of the dam is km^{2}. The dam impounds about 8 ha of land when full and can store 616 thousand cubic meters of water. The construction of the dam was started on and completed in 1923.
