= Nishitakao Dam =

Dam in Tottori Prefecture, Japan

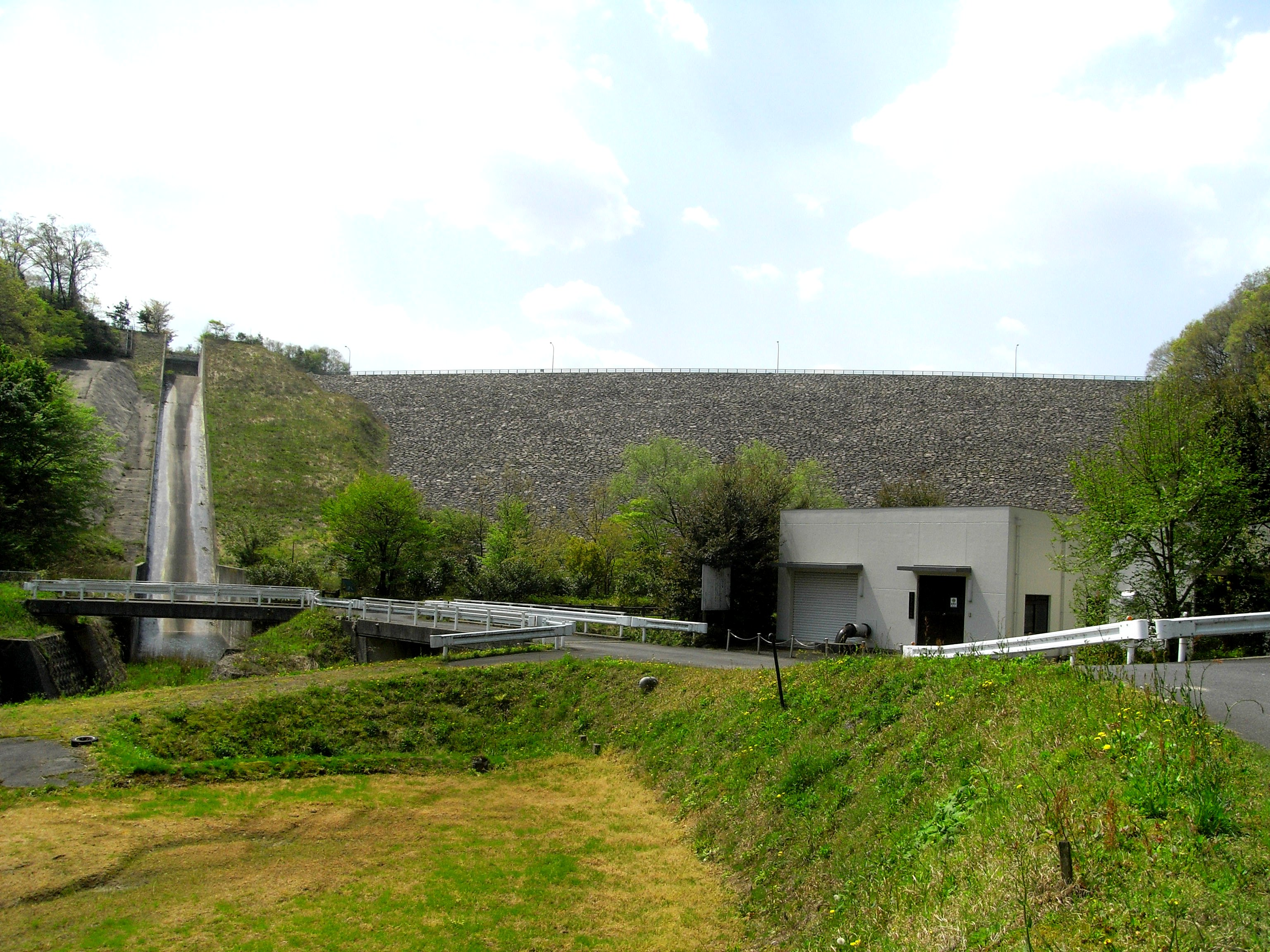

- Location within Japan
- Location: Tottori Prefecture, Japan
- Coordinates: 35°26′28″N 133°42′08″E
- Construction began: 1979
- Opening date: 1992

Dam and spillways
- Height: 46.2 m (152 ft)
- Length: 237 m (778 ft)

Reservoir
- Total capacity: 2,010,000 m^{3} (71,000,000 cu ft)
- Catchment area: 27.2 km^{2} (10.5 sq mi)
- Surface area: 14 hectares (35 acres)

Nishitakao Dam is a rockfill dam located in Tottori prefecture in Japan. The dam is used for irrigation. The catchment area of the dam is 27.2 km^{2}. The dam impounds about 14 ha of land when full and can store 2010 thousand cubic meters of water. The construction of the dam was started on 1979 and completed in 1992.
