= Asanabe Dam =

Dam in Tottori Prefecture, Japan

- Location within Japan
- Interactive map of Asanabe Dam
- Location: Tottori Prefecture, Japan
- Coordinates: 35°20′52″N 133°23′42″E
- Construction began: 1989
- Opening date: 2004

Dam and spillways
- Height: 45 m (148 ft)
- Length: 150 m (490 ft)

Reservoir
- Total capacity: 1380 thousand cubic meters
- Catchment area: 6.2 sq. km
- Surface area: 8 hectares

Asanabe Dam is a gravity dam located in Tottori prefecture in Japan. The dam is used for flood control. The catchment area of the dam is 6.2 km^{2}. The dam impounds about 8 ha of land when full and can store 1380 thousand cubic meters of water. The construction of the dam was started on 1989 and completed in 2004.
