= Tomata Dam =

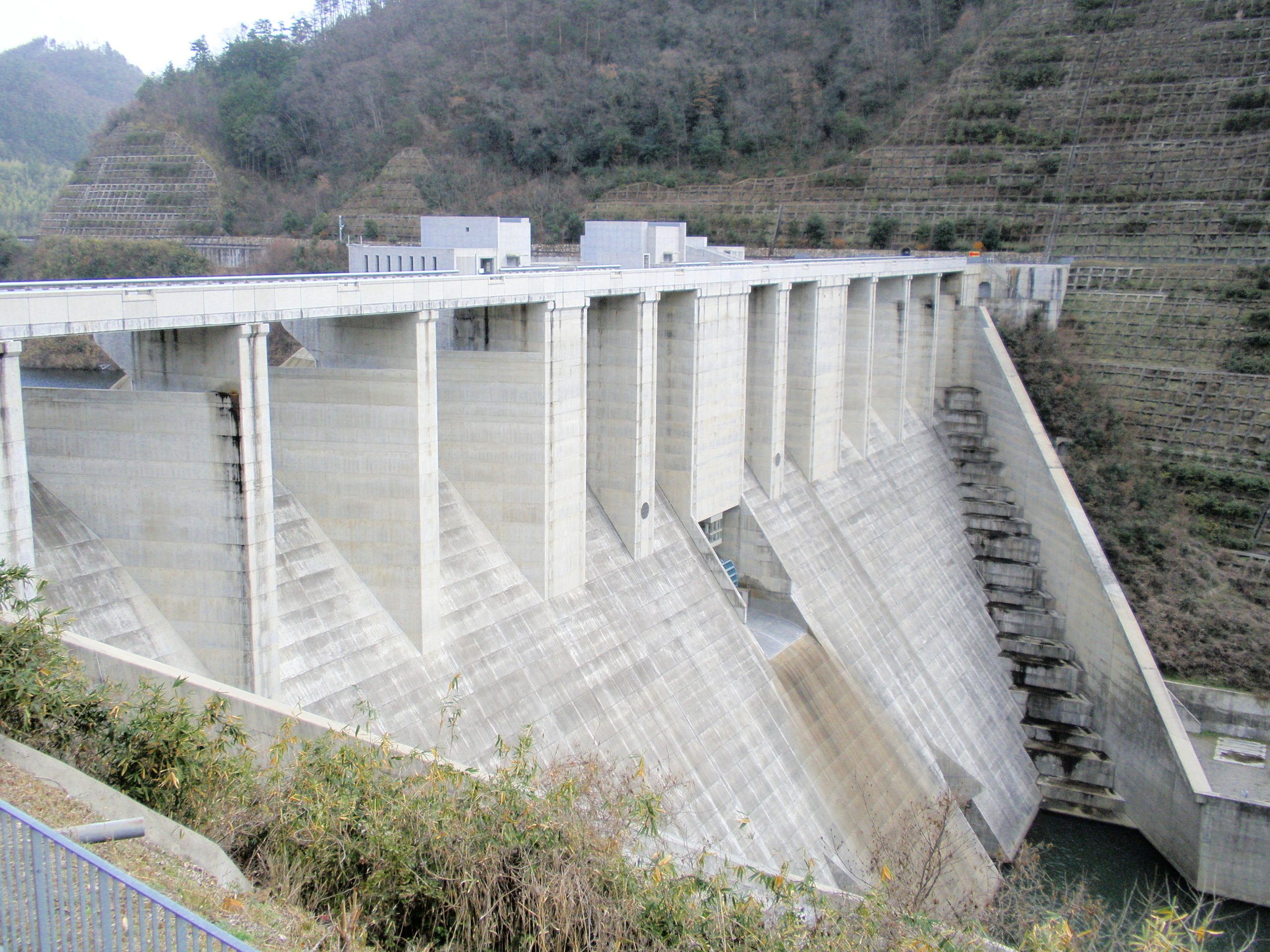
- Interactive map of Tomata Dam
- Location: Okayama Prefecture, Japan
- Coordinates: 35.1271°N 133.8942°E

Tomata Dam (Japanese: 苫田ダム) is a dam in the Okayama Prefecture, Japan, completed in 2004.

All shrines, trees, and houses were moved before the valley was flooded. The town hall was also moved.
