= Doyo Dam =

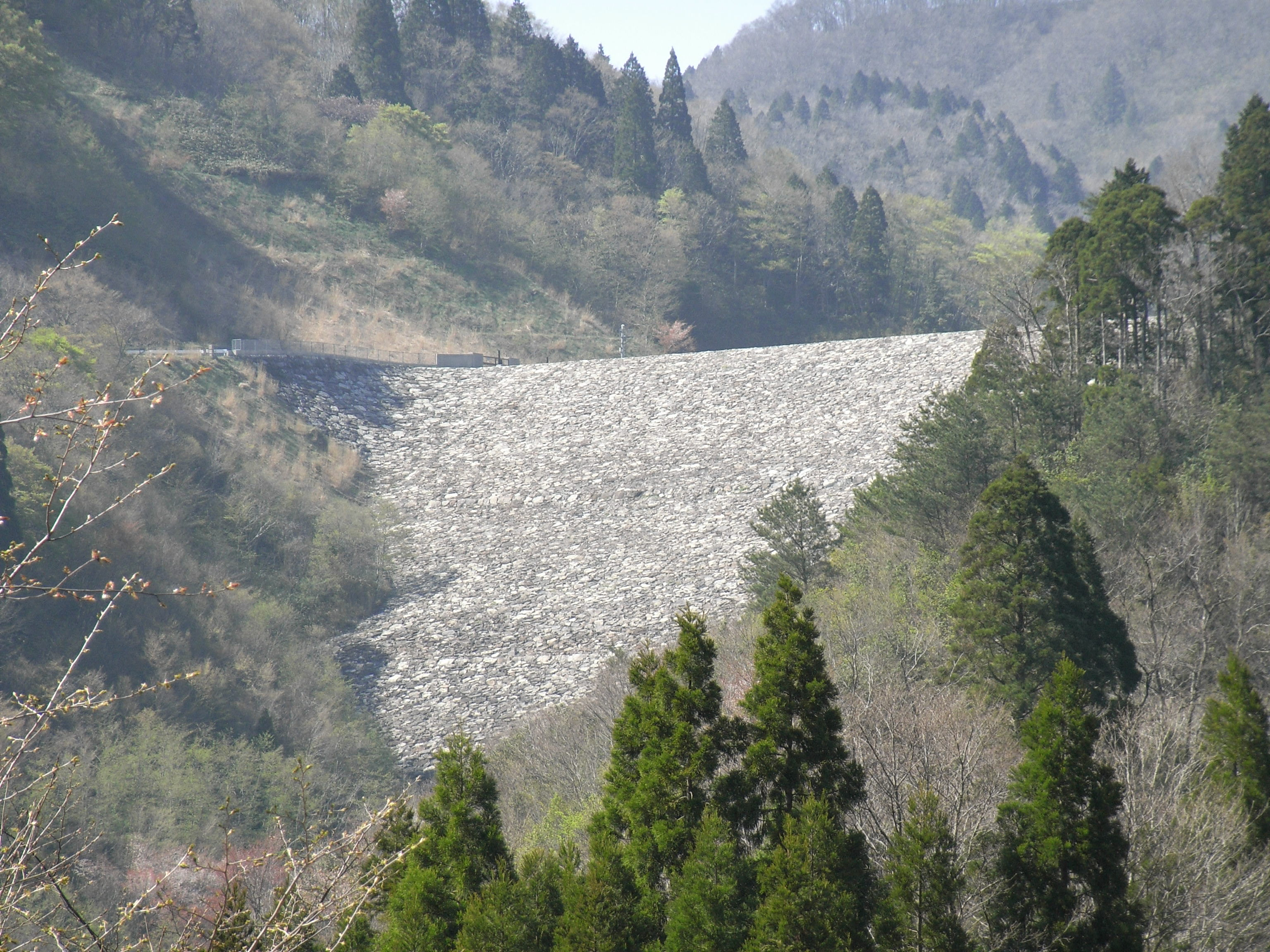

- Location within Japan
- Country: Japan
- Location: Shinjō
- Coordinates: 35°13′53″N 133°32′42″E
- Construction began: 1978
- Opening date: 1986
- Owner: Chugoku Electric Power Company

Dam and spillways
- Type of dam: Embankment, rock-fill
- Height: 86.7 m (284 ft)
- Length: 480 m (1,575 ft)
- Dam volume: 2,650,000 m^{3} (3,466,069 cu yd)

Reservoir
- Total capacity: 7,680,000 m^{3} (6,226 acre⋅ft)
- Active capacity: 6,700,000 m^{3} (5,432 acre⋅ft)
- Catchment area: 1.8 km^{2} (445 acres)
- Surface area: 30 ha (74 acres)

Doyo Dam (Japanese: 土用ダム) is a rock-fill embankment dam located 6 km (4 mi) north of Shinjō in the Okayama Prefecture, Japan. It creates the upper reservoir for the 1,500 MW Matanoagawa Pumped Storage Power Station while the Matanoagawa Dam creates the lower.
