= Nakatsu Dam =

Dam in Tottori Prefecture, Japan

- Location within Japan
- Location: Tottori Prefecture, Japan
- Coordinates: 35°22′32″N 133°59′17″E
- Construction began: 1954
- Opening date: 1957

Dam and spillways
- Height: 35 m (115 ft)
- Length: 96 m (315 ft)

Reservoir
- Total capacity: 1375 thousand cubic meters
- Catchment area: 19.2 sq. km
- Surface area: 15 hectares

Nakatsu Dam is a gravity dam located in Tottori prefecture in Japan. The dam is used for power production. The catchment area of the dam is 19.2 km^{2}. The dam impounds about 15 ha of land when full and can store 1375 thousand cubic meters of water. The construction of the dam was started on 1954 and completed in 1957.
