= Onbara Dam =

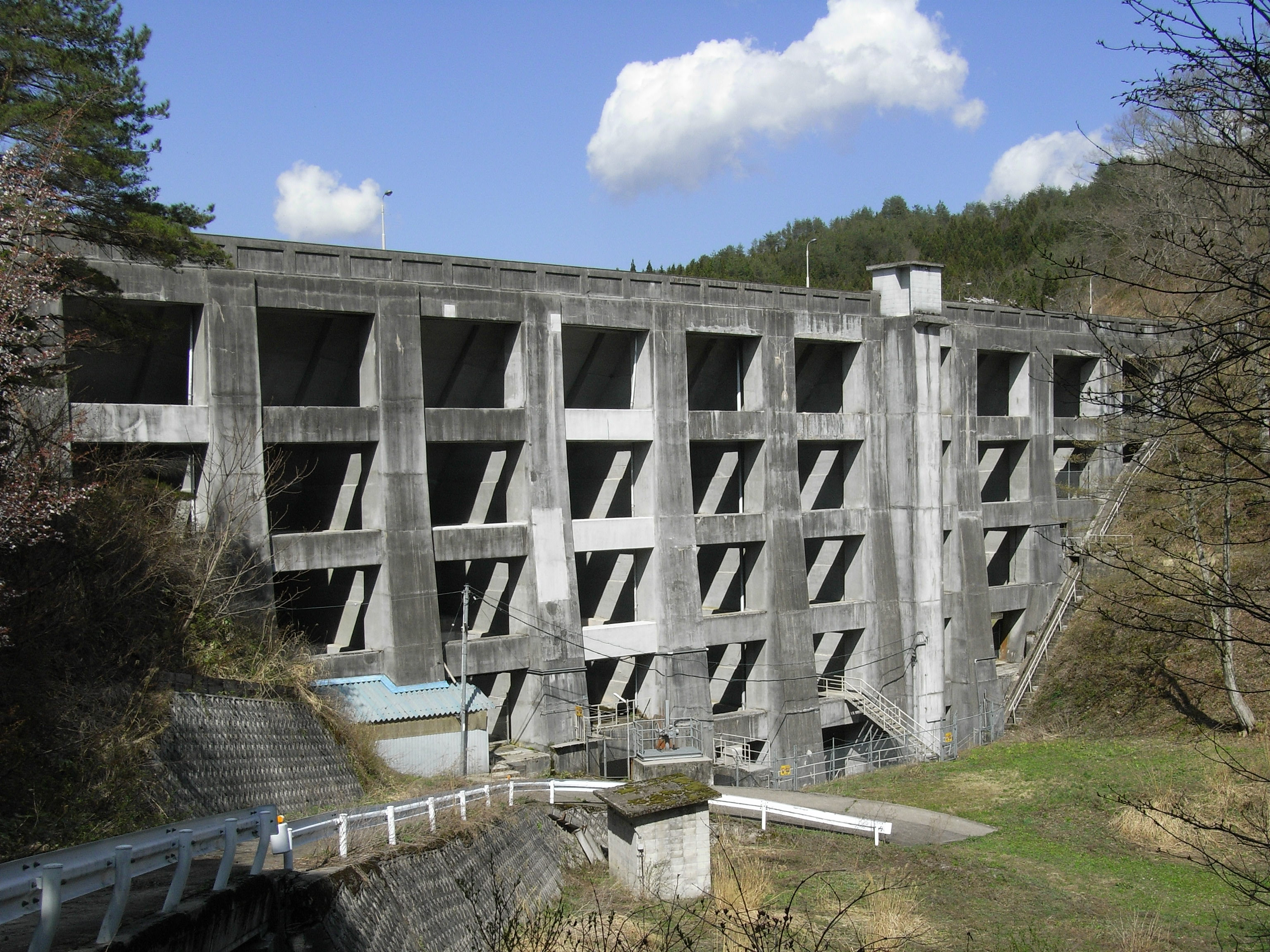
- Interactive map of Onbara Dam
- Location: Okayama Prefecture, Japan
- Coordinates: 35°18′01″N 133°59′15″E

Onbara Dam (Japanese: 恩原ダム) is a dam in the Okayama Prefecture, Japan, completed in 1927.

The Onbara Dam is the oldest existing buttress dam for power generation.

It is unknown if or how many buildings were submerged in the construction of the dam.
