= Meiji Dam =

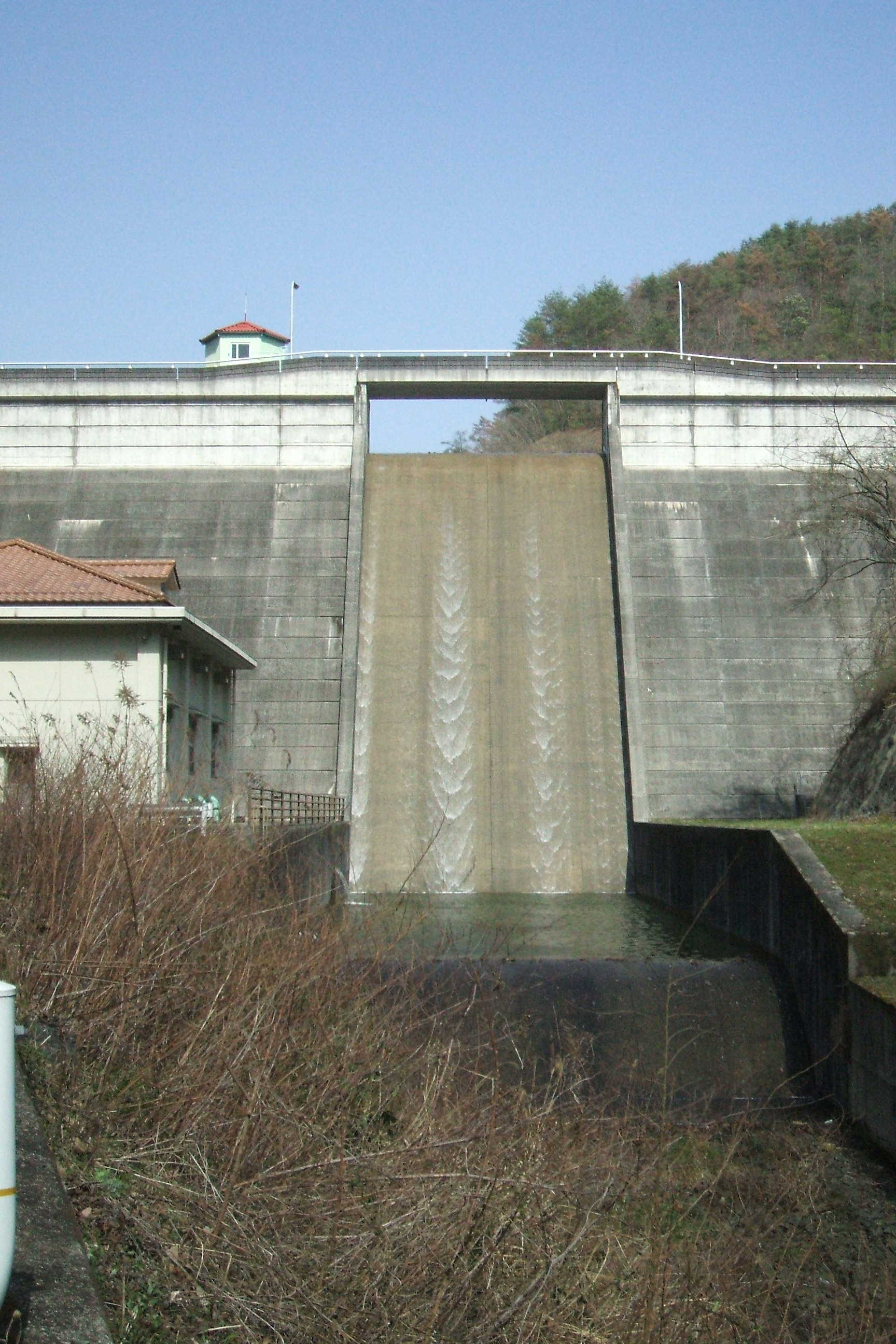
- Interactive map of Meiji Dam
- Location: Ibara, Okayama Prefecture, Japan
- Coordinates: 34°40′42″N 133°25′38″E
- Construction began: 1974
- Opening date: 1993

Dam and spillways
- Type of dam: Gravity dam
- Height: 33.4 m (110 ft)
- Length: 106 m (348 ft)
- Dam volume: 28,000 m^{3}

Reservoir
- Total capacity: 470,000 m^{3}
- Catchment area: 2.8 km^{2}
- Surface area: 5 ha

Meiji Dam (Japanese: 明治ダム) is a concrete dam near Ibara, Okayama Prefecture, Japan, completed in 1993. It was built for irrigation purposes.
