= Ohkamidani Tameike Dam =

Dam in Tottori Prefecture, Japan

- Location within Japan
- Location: Tottori Prefecture, Japan
- Coordinates: 35°22′32″N 133°43′31″E
- Opening date: 1973

Dam and spillways
- Height: 27.2 m (89 ft)
- Length: 255.5 m (838 ft)

Reservoir
- Total capacity: 1,319,000 m^{3} (46,600,000 cu ft)
- Catchment area: 1 km^{2} (0.39 sq mi)
- Surface area: 15 hectares (37 acres)

Ohkamidani Tameike Dam is an earthfill dam located in Tottori prefecture in Japan. The dam is used for irrigation. The catchment area of the dam is 1 km^{2}. The dam impounds about 15 ha of land when full and can store, 1319 thousand cubic meters of water. The construction of the dam was started on and completed in 1973.
