= Osakabegawa Dam =

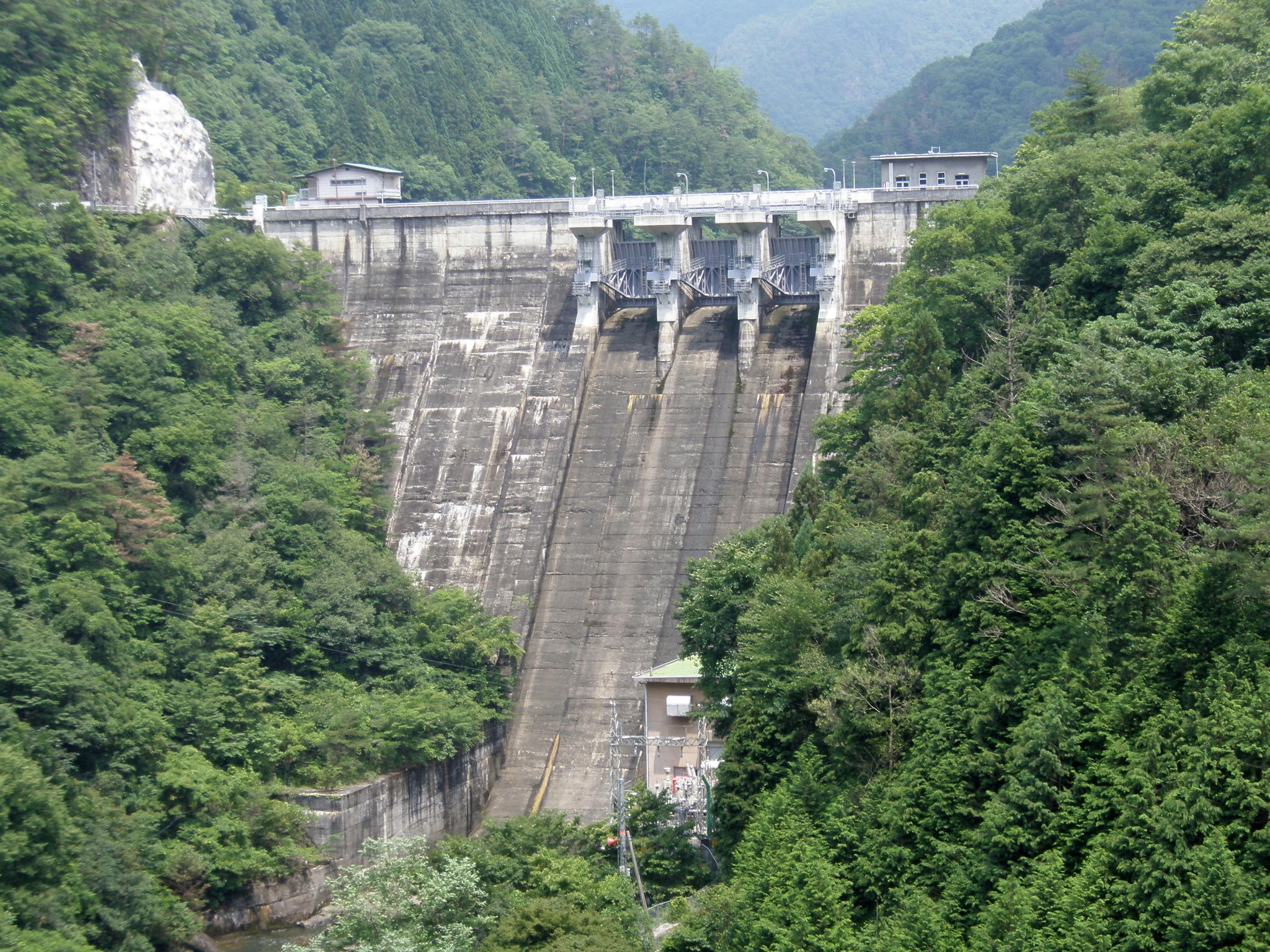
- Interactive map of Osakabegawa Dam
- Location: Okayama Prefecture, Japan
- Coordinates: 34°58′50″N 133°31′52″E

Osakabegawa Dam (Japanese: 小阪部川ダム) is a dam in the Okayama Prefecture, Japan, completed in 1954.
