= Myogadani Dam =

Dam in Tottori Prefecture, Japan

- Location within Japan
- Location: Tottori Prefecture, Japan
- Coordinates: 35°20′51″N 134°27′34″E
- Construction began: 1958
- Opening date: 1960

Dam and spillways
- Height: 40 m (130 ft)
- Length: 124.5 m (408 ft)

Reservoir
- Total capacity: 612 thousand cubic meters
- Catchment area: 50.4 sq. km
- Surface area: 5 hectares

Myogadani Dam is a gravity dam located in Tottori prefecture in Japan. The dam is used for power production. The catchment area of the dam is 50.4 km^{2}. The dam impounds about 5 ha of land when full and can store 612 thousand cubic meters of water. The construction of the dam was started on 1958 and completed in 1960.
