= Tabara Dam =

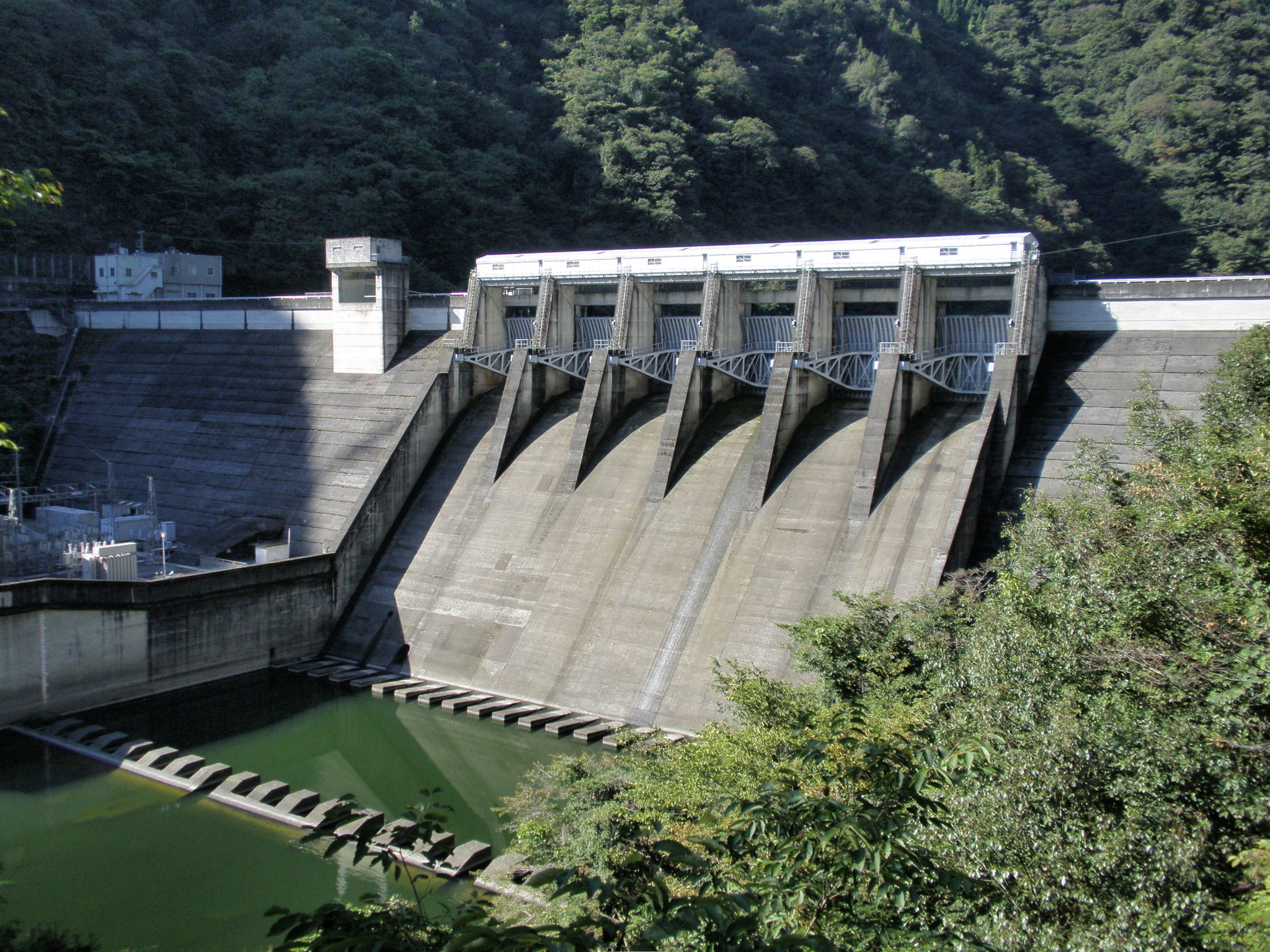
- Interactive map of Tabara Dam
- Location: Okayama Prefecture, Japan
- Coordinates: 34.8103°N 133.4253°E

Tabara Dam (Japanese: 新成羽川ダム) is a dam in the Okayama Prefecture, Japan, completed in 1968.
