= Togo Dam (Hokkaido) =

Dam in Hokkaido Prefecture, Japan

- Location within Japan
- Location: Hokkaido Prefecture, Japan
- Coordinates: 43°13′44″N 142°35′01″E
- Construction began: 1969

Dam and spillways
- Height: 47.5 m (156 ft)
- Length: 375.4 m (1,232 ft)

Reservoir
- Total capacity: 510,000 m^{3} (18,000,000 cu ft)
- Catchment area: 35.8 km^{2} (13.8 sq mi)
- Surface area: 12 hectares (30 acres)

Togo Dam (Japanese: 東郷ダム) is a rockfill dam located in Hokkaido Prefecture in Japan. The dam is used for irrigation. The catchment area of the dam is 35.8 km^{2}. The dam impounds about 12 ha of land when full and can store 510 thousand cubic meters of water. The construction of the dam was completed in 1969 .
