= Momodani Dam =

Dam in Tottori Prefecture, Japan

- Location within Japan
- Location: Tottori Prefecture, Japan
- Coordinates: 35°30′38″N 134°16′25″E
- Construction began: 1969
- Opening date: 1973

Dam and spillways
- Height: 18 m (59 ft)
- Length: 79 m (259 ft)

Reservoir
- Total capacity: 280 thousand cubic meters
- Catchment area: 2.5 sq. km
- Surface area: 5 hectares

Momodani Dam is a gravity dam located in Tottori prefecture in Japan. The dam is used for flood control. The catchment area of the dam is 2.5 km^{2}. The dam impounds about 5 ha of land when full and can store 280 thousand cubic meters of water. The construction of the dam was started on 1969 and completed in 1973.
