= Kasyo Dam =

Dam in Tottori Prefecture, Japan

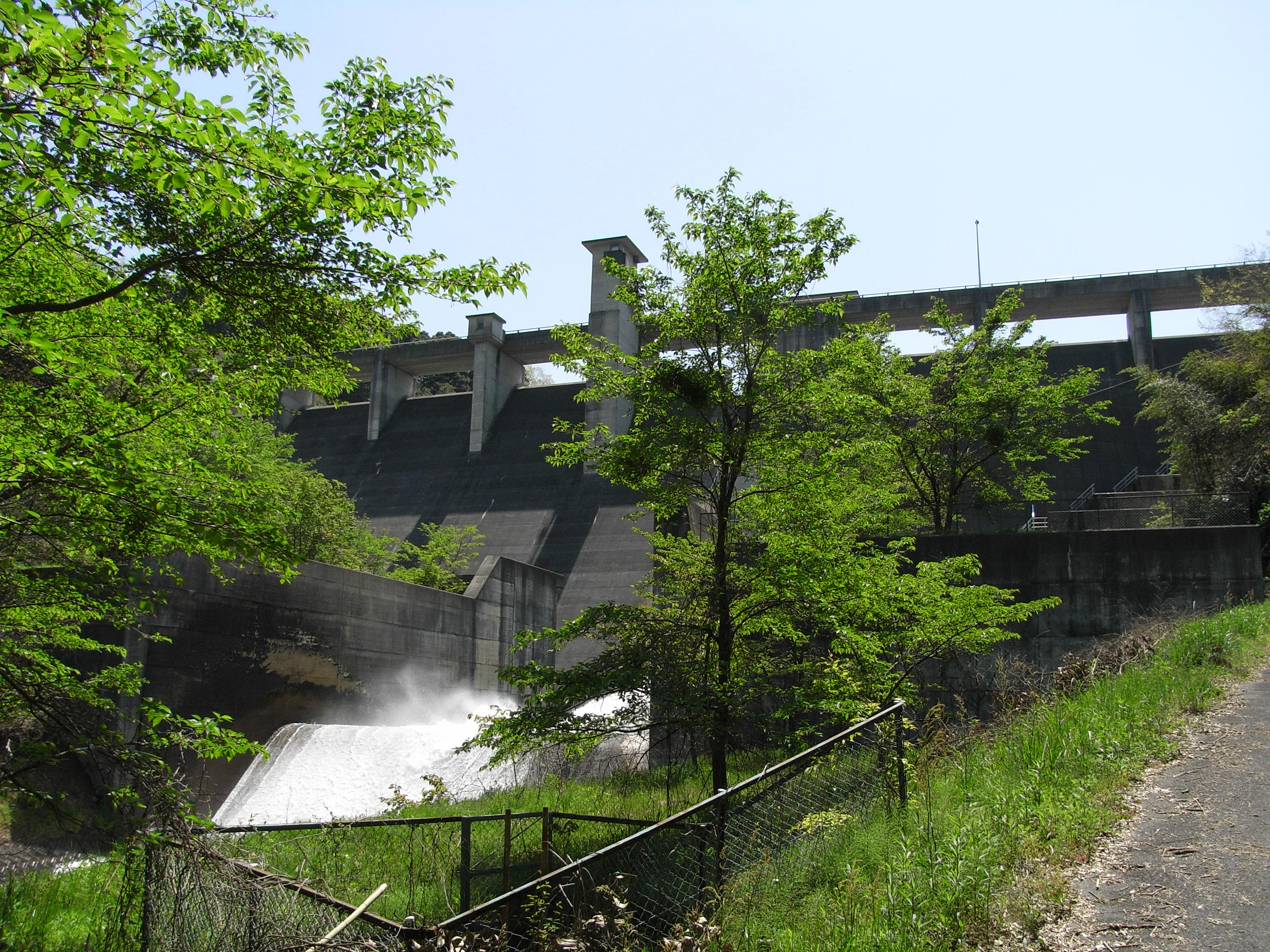

- Location within Japan
- Location: Tottori Prefecture, Japan
- Coordinates: 35°18′32″N 133°19′46″E
- Construction began: 1971
- Opening date: 1989

Dam and spillways
- Height: 46.4 m (152 ft)
- Length: 174 m (571 ft)

Reservoir
- Total capacity: 7450 thousand cubic meters
- Catchment area: 26 sq. km
- Surface area: 64 hectares

Kasyo Dam is a gravity dam located in Tottori prefecture in Japan. The dam is used for flood control and water supply. The catchment area of the dam is 26 km^{2}. The dam impounds about 64 ha of land when full and can store 7450 thousand cubic meters of water. The construction of the dam was started on 1971 and completed in March 1989.
