= Sajigawa Dam =

Dam in Tottori Prefecture, Japan

- Location within Japan
- Location: Tottori Prefecture, Japan
- Coordinates: 35°19′45″N 134°2′37″E
- Construction began: 1967
- Opening date: 1971

Dam and spillways
- Height: 46.5 m (153 ft)
- Length: 105 m (344 ft)

Reservoir
- Total capacity: 2,310,000 m^{3} (82,000,000 cu ft)
- Catchment area: 38 km^{2} (15 sq mi)
- Surface area: 16 hectares (40 acres)

Sajigawa Dam is a gravity dam located in Tottori prefecture in Japan. The dam is used for flood control and power production. The catchment area of the dam is 38 km^{2}. The dam impounds about 16 ha of land when full and can store 2310 thousand cubic meters of water. The construction of the dam was started on 1967 and completed in 1971.
