= Kawagawa No.2 Dam =

Dam in Tottori Prefecture, Japan

- Location within Japan
- Interactive map of Kawagawa No.2 Dam
- Location: Tottori Prefecture, Japan
- Coordinates: 35°27′10″N 133°30′50″E
- Opening date: 1993

Dam and spillways
- Height: 17 m (56 ft)
- Length: 46 m (151 ft)

Reservoir
- Total capacity: 147 thousand cubic meters
- Catchment area: 10.5 sq. km
- Surface area: hectares

Kawagawa No.2 Dam is a gravity dam located in Tottori prefecture in Japan. The dam is used for irrigation. The catchment area of the dam is 10.5 km^{2}. The dam impounds about ha of land when full and can store 147 thousand cubic meters of water. The construction of the dam was started on and completed in 1993.
