= Tsubakidani Tameike Dam =

Dam in Tottori Prefecture, Japan

Tsubakidani Tameike
- Location within Japan
- Location: Tottori Prefecture, Japan
- Coordinates: 35°20′07″N 133°18′20″E
- Opening date: 1890

Dam and spillways
- Height: 15 m (49 ft)
- Length: 90 m (300 ft)

Reservoir
- Total capacity: 89,000 m^{3} (3,100,000 cu ft)
- Catchment area: sq. km
- Surface area: 2 hectares (4.9 acres)

Tsubakidani Tameike is an earthfill dam located in Tottori prefecture in Japan. The dam is used for irrigation. The catchment area of the dam is km^{2}. The dam impounds about 2 ha of land when full and can store 89 thousand cubic meters of water. The construction of the dam was completed in 1890.
