= Hiyya =

Hiyya may refer to:

- Hiyya the Great (c. 180–230 CE), a first amora generation sage in the Land of Israel
- Hiyya bar Abba, a third generation amoraic sage of the Land of Israel
- Hiyya b. Abin Naggara, a Babylonian rabbi of the fourth generation of amoraim
- Hiyya bar Ashi, a second and third generation Amora sage of Babylon
- Hiyya bar Joseph, a Babylonian rabbi of the 3rd century
- Hiyya al-Daudi (c. 1085 – 1154), rabbi, composer, and poet of Andalusia
- Hiyya Pontremoli, a 17th century Turkish rabbi and poet
- Hiyya Rofe (died 1620), a rabbi of Safed
