= Togo Dam (Tottori) =

Dam in Tottori Prefecture, Japan

- Location within Japan
- Location: Tottori Prefecture, Japan
- Coordinates: 35°26′40″N 133°55′22″E
- Construction began: 1991
- Opening date: 2003

Dam and spillways
- Height: 39.5 m (130 ft)
- Length: 227 m (745 ft)

Reservoir
- Total capacity: 720,000 m^{3} (25,000,000 cu ft)
- Catchment area: 3.2 km^{2} (1.2 sq mi)
- Surface area: 6 hectares (15 acres)

Togo Dam is a gravity dam located in Tottori prefecture in Japan. The dam is used for flood control and irrigation. The catchment area of the dam is 3.2 km^{2}. The dam impounds about 6 ha of land when full and can store 720 thousand cubic meters of water. The construction of the dam was started on 1991 and completed in 2003.
