= Shin-Nariwagawa Dam =

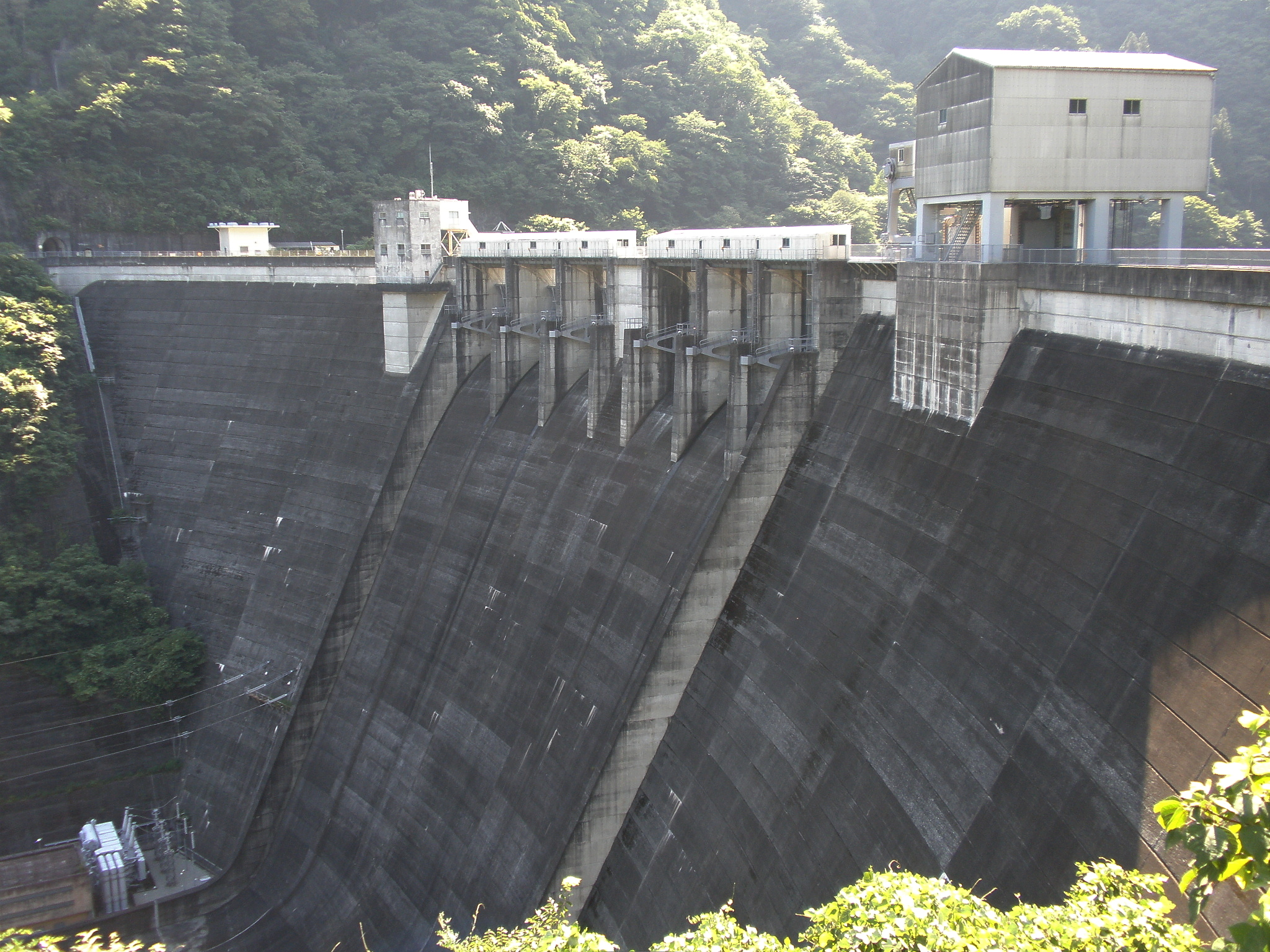
- Interactive map of Shin-Nariwagawa Dam
- Location: Okayama Prefecture, Japan

Shin-Nariwagawa Dam (Japanese: ?) is a dam in the Okayama Prefecture, Japan, completed in 1968.
