= Kōmoto Dam =

Komoto Dam
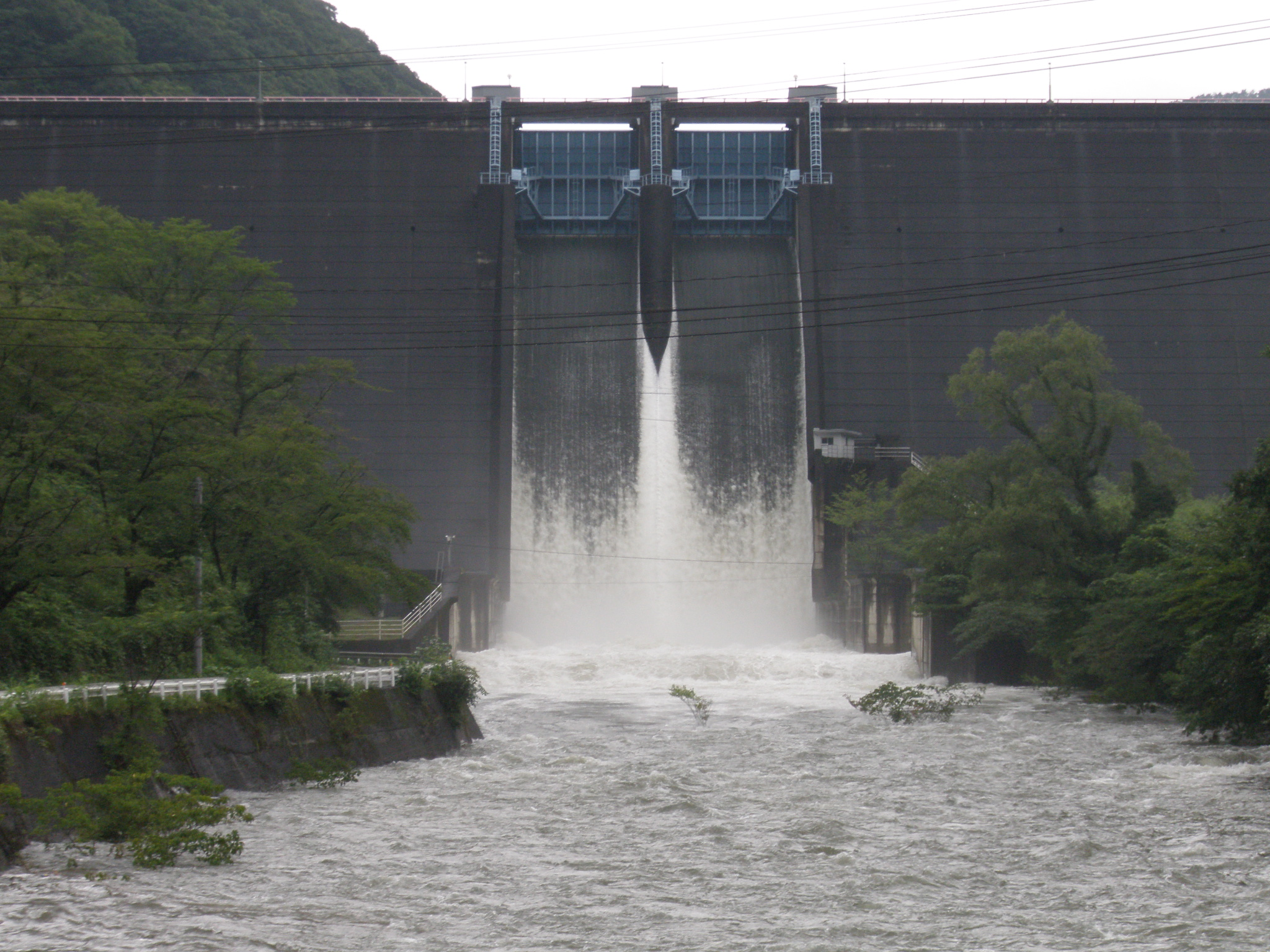

- Location within Japan
- Location: Niimi, Okayama, Japan
- Coordinates: 34°57′45″N 133°27′23″E

Komoto Dam (河本ダム, Kōmoto damu) is a dam in Niimi, Okayama Prefecture, Japan, completed in 1964.
