= Senjozan Dam =

Dam in Tottori Prefecture, Japan

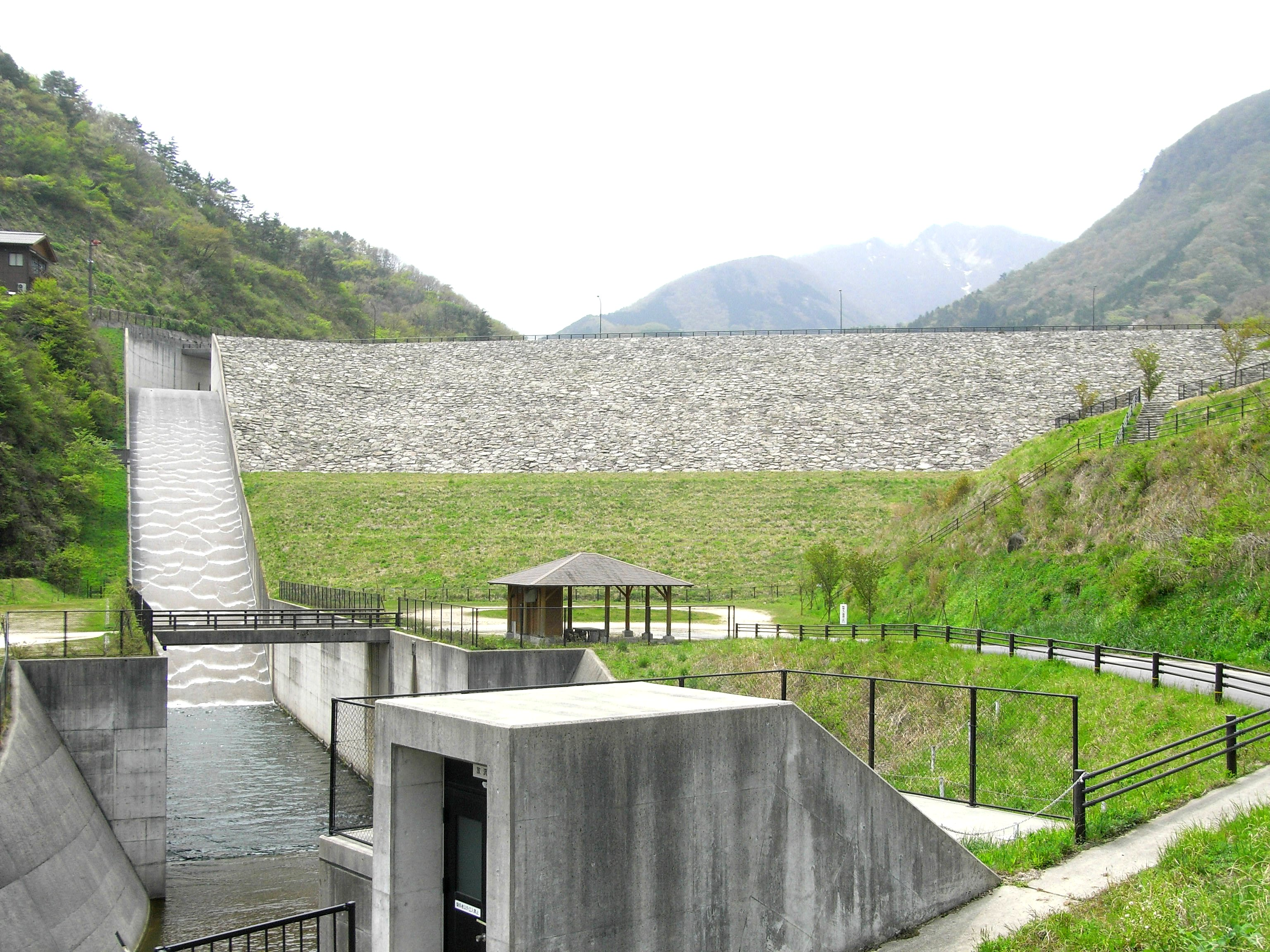

- Location within Japan
- Location: Tottori Prefecture, Japan
- Coordinates: 35°25′41″N 133°36′24″E
- Construction began: 1979
- Opening date: 2003

Dam and spillways
- Height: 43.9 m (144 ft)
- Length: 232.7 m (763 ft)

Reservoir
- Total capacity: 720,000 m^{3} (25,000,000 cu ft)
- Catchment area: 6.5 km^{2} (2.5 sq mi)
- Surface area: 7 hectares (17 acres)

Senjozan Dam is a rockfill dam located in Tottori prefecture in Japan. The dam is used for irrigation. The catchment area of the dam is 6.5 km^{2}. The dam impounds about 7 ha of land when full and can store 720 thousand cubic meters of water. The construction of the dam was started on 1979 and completed in 2003.
