= Sakura Tameike Dam =

Dam in Tottori Prefecture, Japan

Sakura Tameike
- Location within Japan
- Location: Tottori Prefecture, Japan
- Coordinates: 35°25′51″N 133°42′30″E
- Opening date: 1973

Dam and spillways
- Height: 36.6 m (120 ft)
- Length: 115 m (377 ft)

Reservoir
- Total capacity: 546,000 m^{3} (19,300,000 cu ft)
- Catchment area: 0.3 km^{2} (0.12 sq mi)
- Surface area: 8 hectares (20 acres)

Sakura Tameike is an earthfill dam located in Tottori prefecture in Japan. The dam is used for irrigation. The catchment area of the dam is 0.3 km^{2}. The dam impounds about 8 ha of land when full and can store 546 thousand cubic meters of water. The construction of the dam was completed in 1973.
