= Tetsuzan-ike Dam =

Dam in Tottori Prefecture, Japan

Tetsuzan-ike
- Location within Japan
- Location: Tottori Prefecture, Japan
- Coordinates: 35°26′31″N 133°43′53″E
- Opening date: 1940

Dam and spillways
- Height: 19 m (62 ft)
- Length: 78.5 m (258 ft)

Reservoir
- Total capacity: 51,000 m^{3} (1,800,000 cu ft)
- Catchment area: sq. km
- Surface area: 2 hectares (4.9 acres)

Tetsuzan-ike is an earthfill dam located in Tottori prefecture in Japan. The dam is used for irrigation. The catchment area of the dam is km^{2}. The dam impounds about 2 ha of land when full and can store 51 thousand cubic meters of water. The construction of the dam was completed in 1940.
