= Takasegawa Dam =

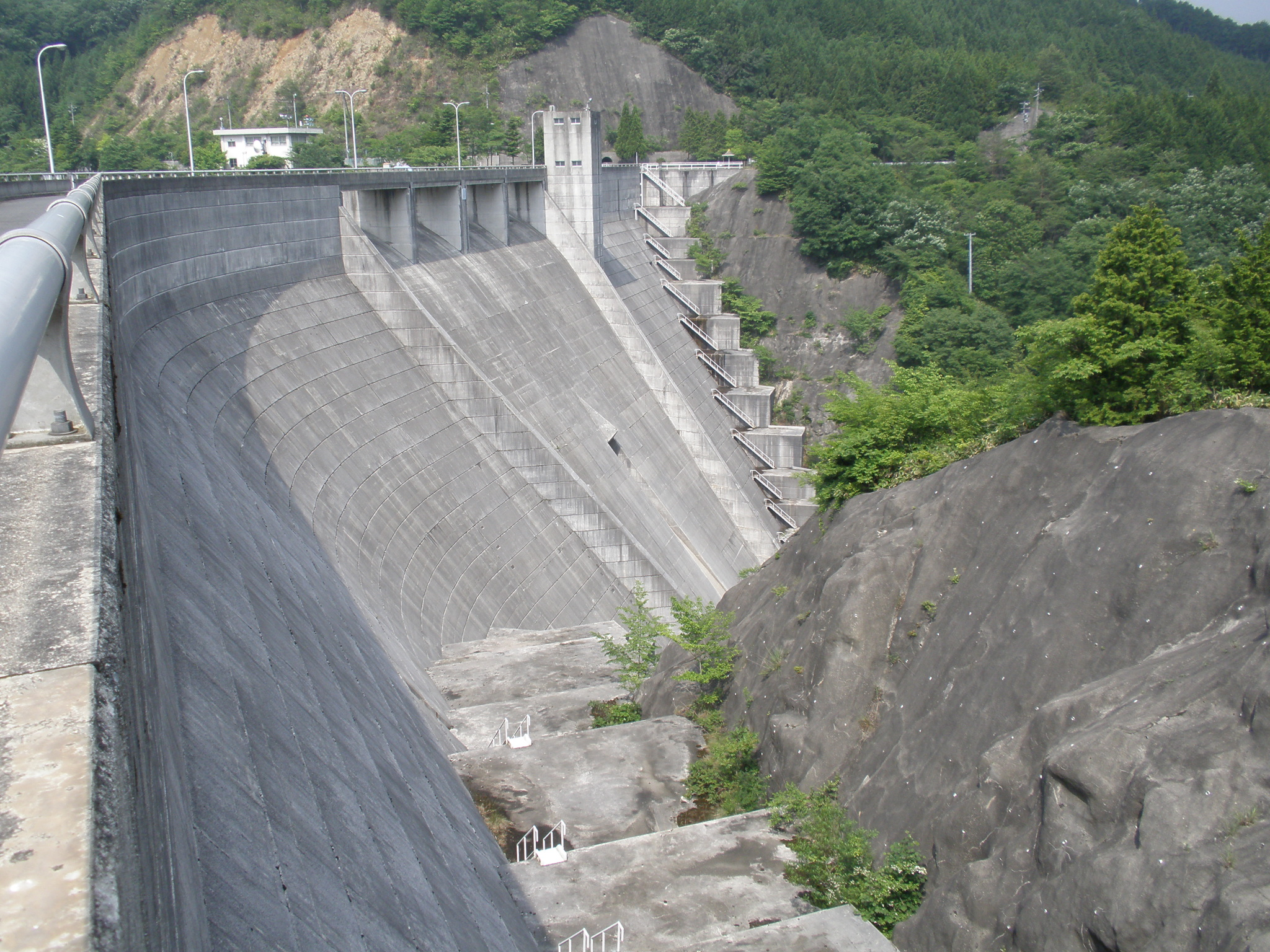
- Interactive map of Takasegawa Dam
- Location: Okayama Prefecture, Japan
- Coordinates: 35.0742°N 133.3577°E

Takasegawa Dam (Japanese: ?) is a dam in the Okayama Prefecture, Japan, completed in 1982.
