= Kurodani Dam =

Coordinates: 34°47′16″N 133°47′44″E

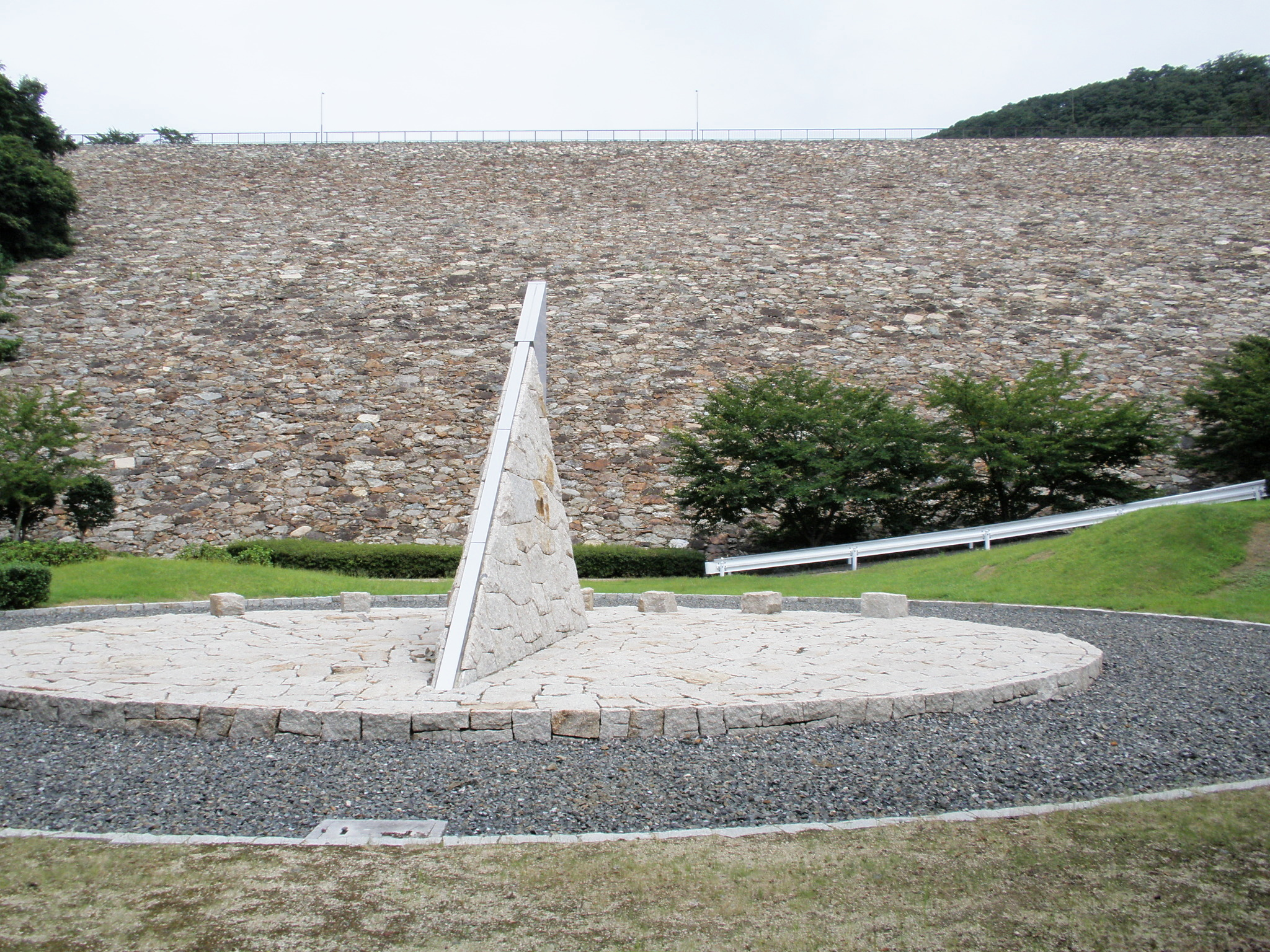
- Interactive map of Kurodani Dam
- Official name: 黒谷ダム
- Location: Okayama Prefecture, Japan
- Purpose: Flood control, irrigation
- Construction began: 1984
- Opening date: 1990; 36 years ago
- Owner: Okayama Prefecture

Dam and spillways
- Type of dam: Earth fill dam
- Impounds: Ashimori River
- Height: 43.6 m (143 ft)
- Length: 208.5 m (684 ft)
- Dam volume: 374,000 m^{3} (13,200,000 ft^{3})

Reservoir
- Creates: Kurodani Pond
- Catchment area: 10 km^{2} (3.9 sq mi)

Kurodani Dam (Japanese: 黒谷ダム) is a dam in the Okayama Prefecture, Japan, completed in 1931.
