= Kodamata Dam =

Dam in Tottori Prefecture, Japan

- Location within Japan
- Location: Tottori Prefecture, Japan
- Coordinates: 35°26′32″N 133°38′42″E
- Construction began: 1977
- Opening date: 2006

Dam and spillways
- Height: 50 m (160 ft)
- Length: 347 m (1,138 ft)

Reservoir
- Total capacity: 2000 thousand cubic meters
- Catchment area: 9 sq. km
- Surface area: 14 hectares

Kodamata Dam is a rockfill dam located in Tottori prefecture in Japan. The dam is used for irrigation. The catchment area of the dam is 9 km^{2}. The dam impounds about 14 ha of land when full and can store 2000 thousand cubic meters of water. The construction of the dam was started on 1977 and completed in 2006.
