= Yokotani Tameike Dam =

Dam in Tottori Prefecture, Japan

- Location within Japan
- Location: Tottori Prefecture, Japan
- Coordinates: 35°23′13″N 133°45′17″E
- Opening date: 1952

Dam and spillways
- Height: 16.7 m (55 ft)
- Length: 118.6 m (389 ft)

Reservoir
- Total capacity: 182,000 m^{3} (6,400,000 cu ft)
- Catchment area: 0.5 km^{2} (0.19 sq mi)
- Surface area: 4 hectares (9.9 acres)

Yokotani Tameike Dam is an earthfill dam located in Tottori prefecture in Japan. The dam is used for irrigation. The catchment area of the dam is 0.5 km^{2}. The dam impounds about 4 ha of land when full and can store 182 thousand cubic meters of water. The construction of the dam was completed in 1952.
