= Mimurogawa Dam =

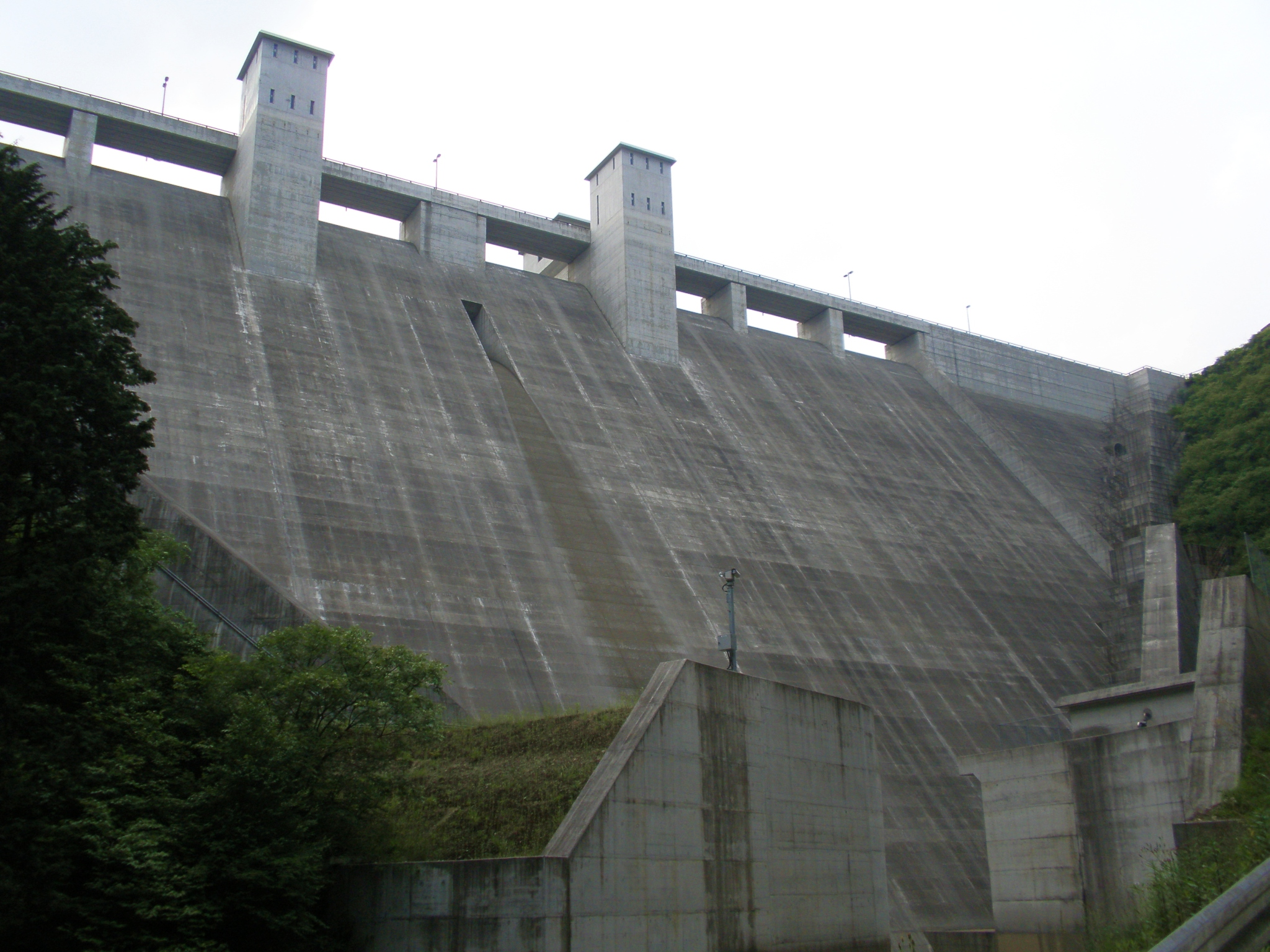
- Interactive map of Mimurogawa Dam
- Location: Okayama Prefecture, Japan
- Coordinates: 35°02′02″N 133°20′24″E

Mimurogawa Dam (Japanese: 三室川ダム) is a dam in the Okayama Prefecture, Japan, completed in 2005.
