= Chiya Dam =

Coordinates: 35°03′24″N 133°27′25″E

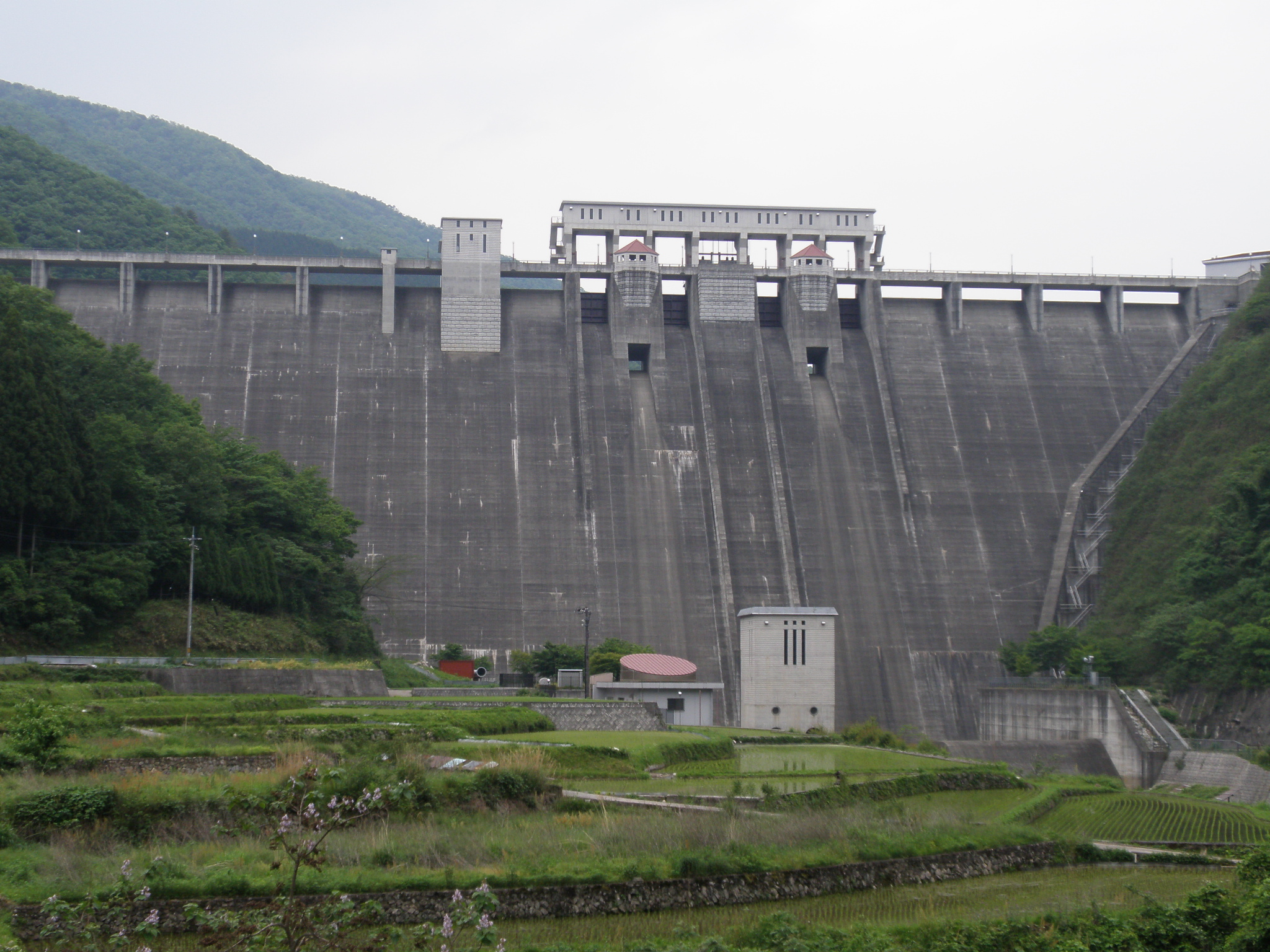
- Interactive map of Chiya Dam
- Location: Niimi, Okayama, Japan

Chiya Dam (Japanese: 千屋ダム) is a dam constructed near the origin of the class A Takahasi river, located in Niimi, Okayama Prefecture, Japan.

== Overview ==
The dam is managed by the Takahashi River Dam Integrated Management Office of the Bicchu Prefectural Bureau in Okayama Prefecture. At a height of 97.5 meters, the dam is classified as an auxiliary multipurpose gravity dam. The dam serves a multitude of purposes. These purposes include flood control, maintaining the normal flow of running water for the river, providing tap water for Niimi, supplying industrial water for downstream Mizushima in Kurashiki, as well as generating electricity. The artificial lake formed by the dam was given the name "Sensui Lake."

The name of the dam, "Chiya," refers to a segment of the river further upstream where the dam was originally planned to be constructed. However, due to a change of plans, the dam ended up being built significantly further downstream. Despite this, the name of the dam was not altered.

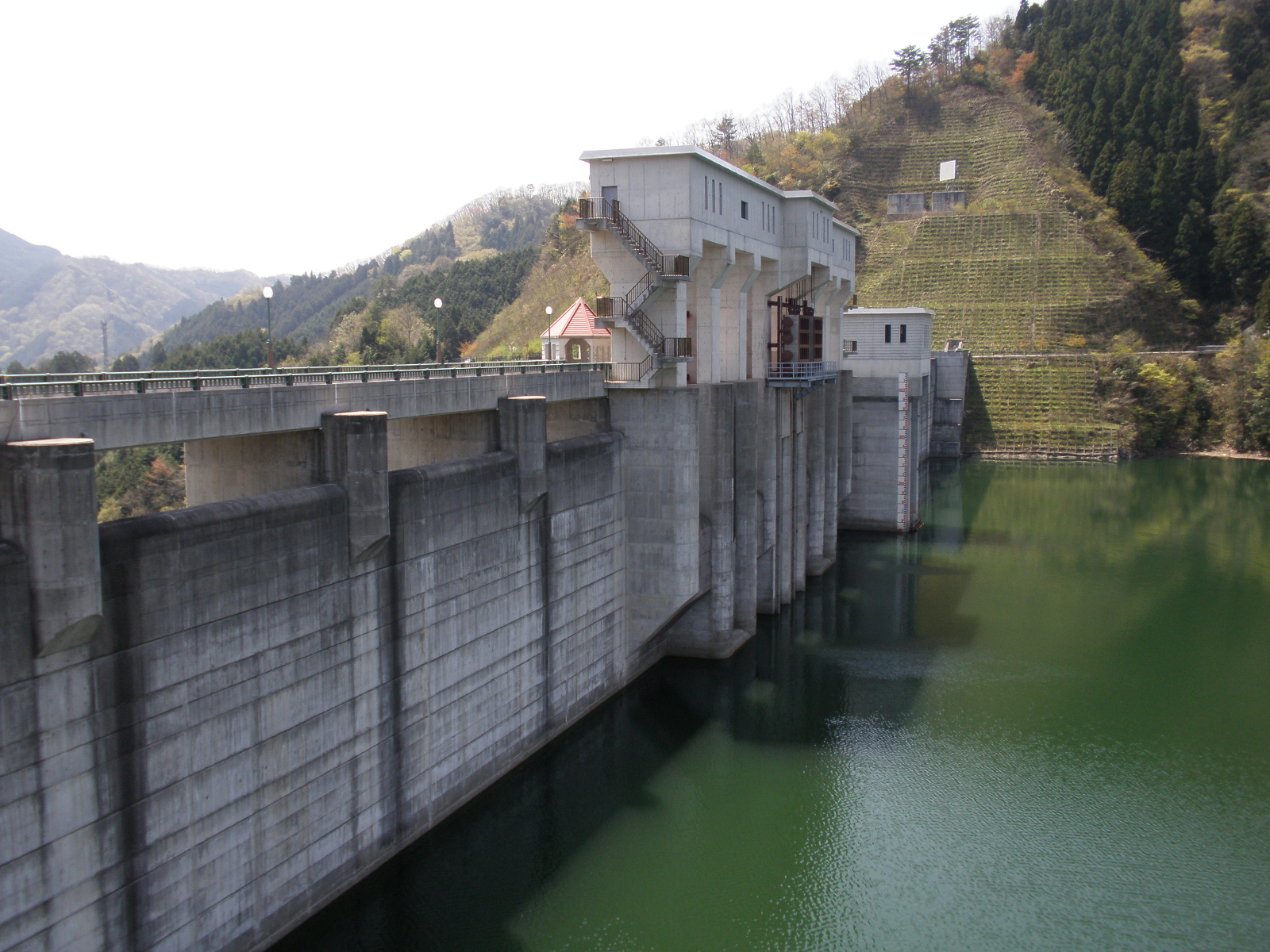
Lakeside perspective of the dam

The dam's control center can be found on its left bank, with the first floor of the building serving as a reference library.

== History ==
- April 1971: Beginning of the dam's construction planning survey and feasibility study.
- April 1975: Approval for the dam's construction.
- December 1980: Work begins on replacing Route 180, which passes near the dam's construction site.
- May 29, 1987: A section of the new Route 180 is put into service.
- November 1988: Obara tunnel of Route 180 finishes construction (length 910m).
- March 1989: Afuku tunnel of Route 180 finishes construction (length 681m).
- March 24, 1989: Construction of the dam's primary body begins.
- June 1, 1989: The new Route 180 is fully put into service (total length 5.3 km).
- June 10, 1992: Concrete pouring into the dam's body begins.
- April 26, 1993: Corner stone laying ceremony takes place.
- December 27, 1995: Concrete pouring into the dam's body is completed.
- June 4, 1997: Work on the dam's body is completed.
- June 30, 1997: Installation of the dam's various measuring and warning systems is completed.
- October 22, 1998: The Chiya Dam construction completion ceremony takes place.
- March 31, 1999: The Chiya Dam construction project is officially completed.

== Chiya Power Station ==
The Chiya Power Station leverages the water flow from the dam to generate electricity. The power station is run under the authority of the Okayama Prefecture. There is no specific capacity dedicated for power generation, and the power station is classified as "dependent power generator," in which the water used for electricity generation is supplied from the water supply and water for industrial use.

=== Overview of the Power Station ===
- Location: Between 1717 and 1714 Shiraihara, Sakamoto, Niimi City, Okayama Prefecture and 1746-1 Tenjinwaki.
- Water Intake: Chiya Dam Water Intake 1748, Sakamoto, Niimi City, Okayama Prefecture.
- Output: Maximum 3,000 kW.
- Water Usage Amount: Maximum 5.50m^{3}/s.
- Effective Difference in Elevation: Maximum 66.3m
- Amount of Electricity Supplied per Annum: 13,270MWh (enough to supply 3700 standard households)
- Commencement of Power Generation: 1998
