= Yakumo (train) =

Japanese limited express train service

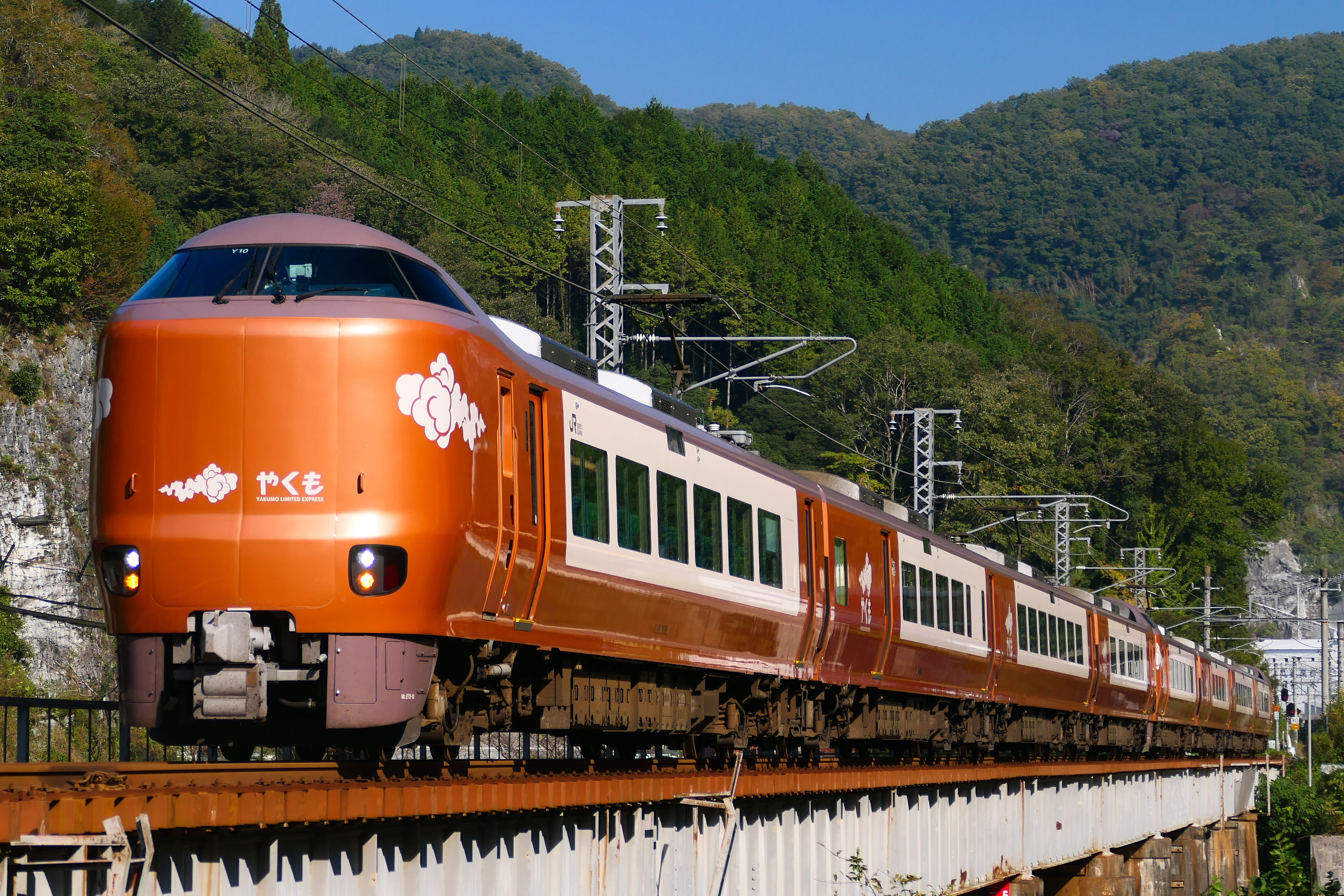
- 273 series train Yakumo

Overview
- Service type: Limited express
- First service: 1972
- Current operator: JR West

Route
- Termini: Okayama; Izumoshi
- Stops: 11
- Service frequency: 15 return workings daily
- Lines used: Sanyo Main Line; Hakubi Line; Sanin Main Line

Technical
- Rolling stock: 273 series EMU

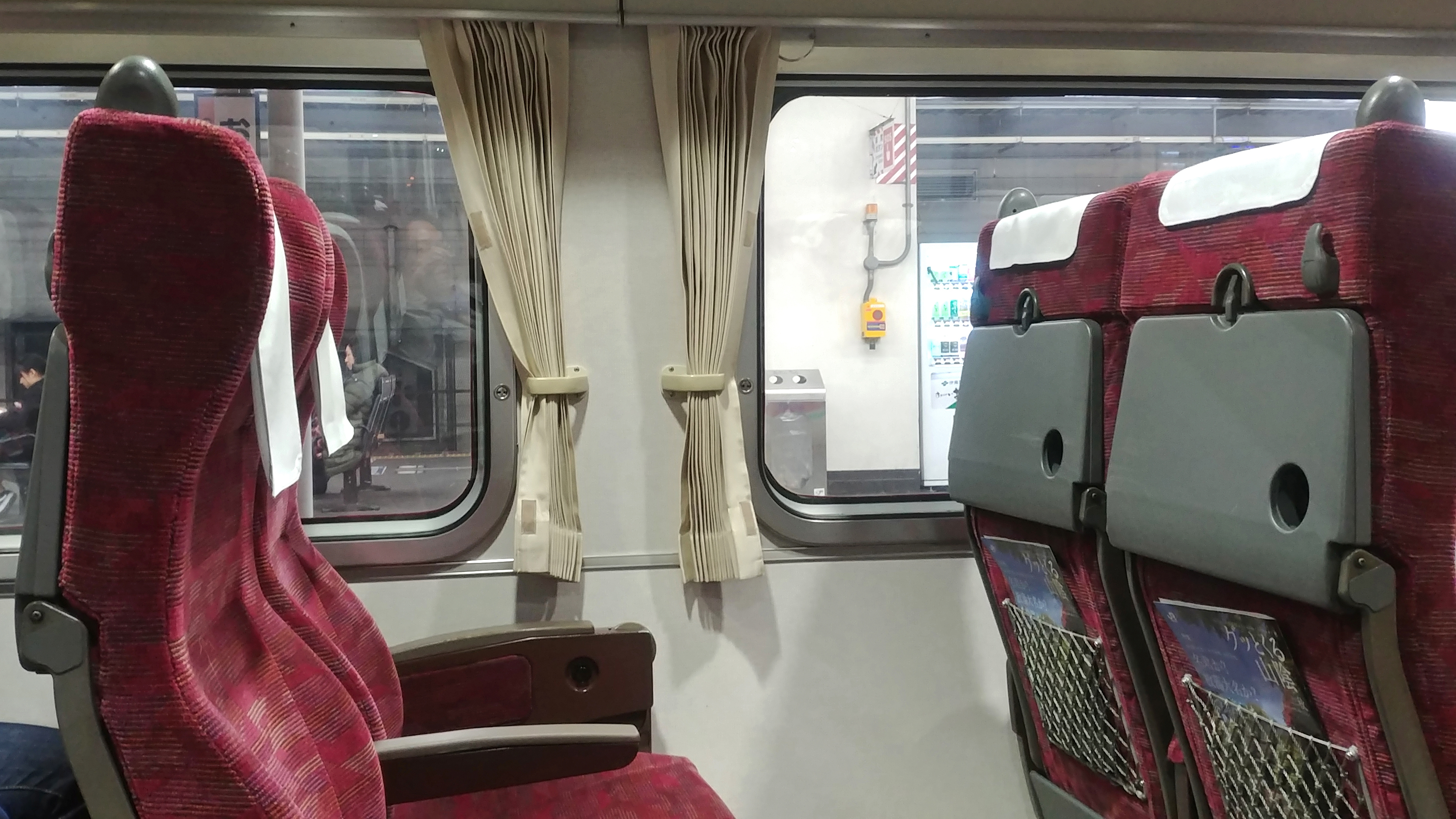
381 series Carriage interior (Nov 2018).

381 series Yakumo pulls into a station (Dec 2018).

The Yakumo (やくも) is a limited express train service in Japan operated by West Japan Railway Company (JR West), which runs from Okayama to Yonago, Matsue and Izumo in Shimane Prefecture.

This limited express train connects Okayama with Yonago in 2 hours, Okayama with Matsue in 2 hours and 30 minutes, and Okayama with Izumoshi in 3 hours. It stops at Okayama, Kurashiki, Sōja (3 trains a day in each direction), Bitchū-Takahashi, Niimi, Shōyama (every other train), Neu (every other train, alternating with Shōyama), Hōki-Daisen (mornings northbound, evenings southbound), Yonago, Yasugi, Matsue, Tamatsukuri-Onsen, Shinji, and Izumoshi.

== Rolling stock ==
- 273 series EMUs (from April 2024)

=== Former rolling stock ===
- KiHa 181 series DMUs (from March 1972, until July 1982)
- 381 series EMUs (from July 1982 until 15 June 2024) (4-, 6-, or 9- car formations)

== Formations ==
Services are formed as shown below:

=== 273 series ===
Car No.	1		2	3	4
Accommodation	Green	Reserved	Reserved	Reserved	Reserved
Notes		Semi-compartment seats		Wheelchair-accessible seat	

=== Former ===
==== 381 series ====
Car No.	1	2	3	4
Accommodation	Green	Reserved	Reserved	Reserved

- Until 5 April 2024, Car 1 was a panoramic green car on some services.

== History ==
The Yakumo service was first introduced on 22 September 1959, as a semi-express service operating between Yonago and Hakata in Kyushu.
