= 381 series =

Japanese train type

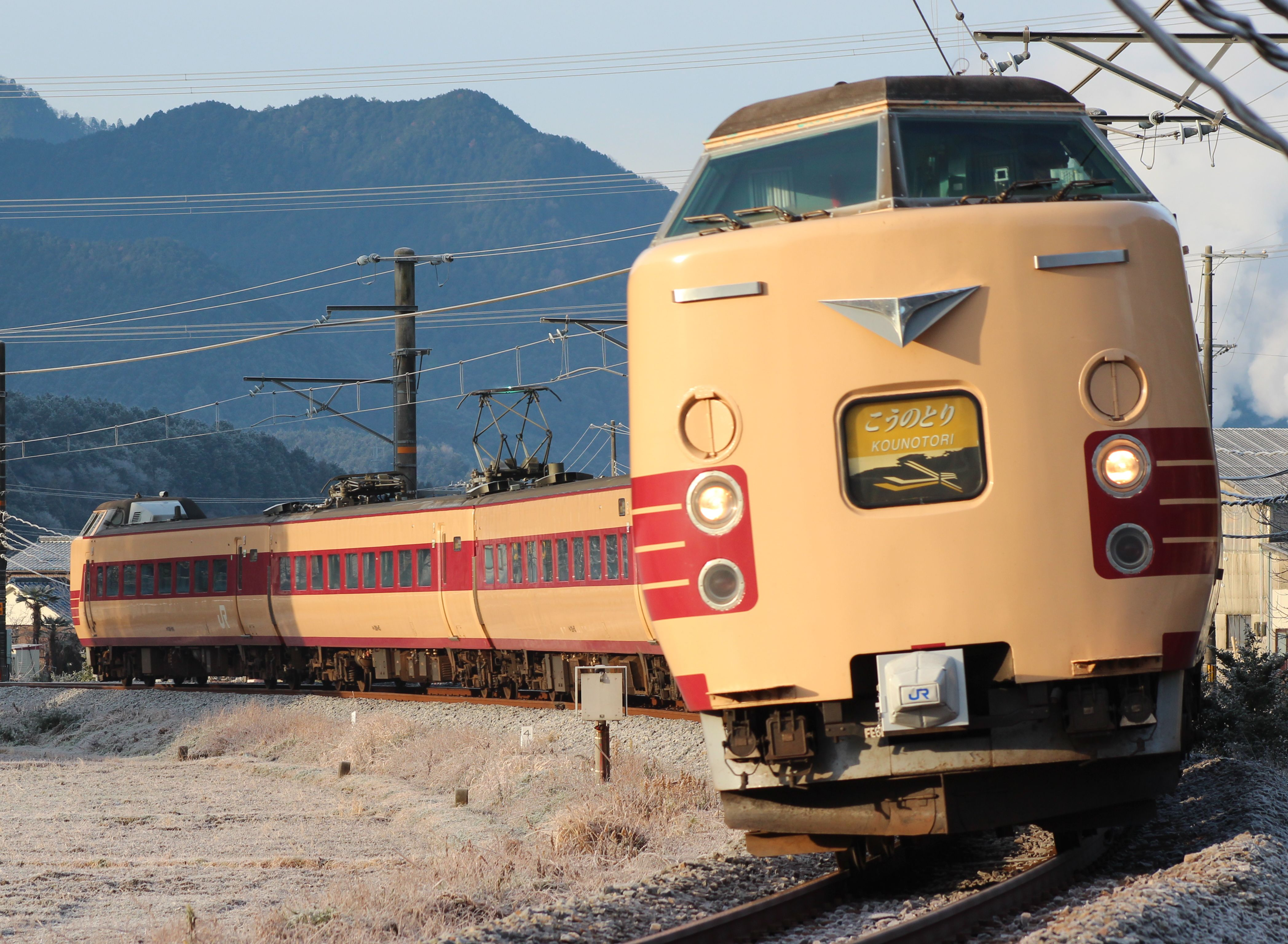
- A 381 series on a Kounotori service in January 2013
- In service: 1973–June 2024 (regular service)
- Manufacturers: Hitachi, Kawasaki Heavy Industries, Kinki Sharyo
- Replaced: 183 series
- Constructed: 1973–1982
- Entered service: 1973
- Refurbished: 1997–2011 (JR West)
- Number built: 277 vehicles
- Number in service: None
- Number preserved: 2 vehicles
- Number scrapped: 140 vehicles
- Successor: 383 series, 287 series, 289 series, 273 series
- Formation: 3/4/6/7/9 cars per trainset
- Operators: JNR (1973–1987); JR Central (1987–2008); JR West (1987–2024)
- Depots: Hineno, Goto, Fukuchiyama
- Line served: Various

Specifications
- Car body construction: Aluminium alloy
- Car length: 21,300 mm (69 ft 11 in)
- Width: 2,920 mm (9 ft 7 in)
- Height: 3,383 mm (11 ft 1.2 in)
- Maximum speed: 120 km/h (75 mph)
- Traction system: Resistor control
- Electric system: 1,500 V DC overhead lines
- Current collection: Pantograph
- Track gauge: 1,067 mm (3 ft 6 in)

The 381 series (381系, 381-kei) was a tilting DC electric multiple unit (EMU) train type introduced in 1973 by Japanese National Railways (JNR), and operated by West Japan Railway Company (JR West), and Central Japan Railway Company (JR Central) in Japan.

== History ==
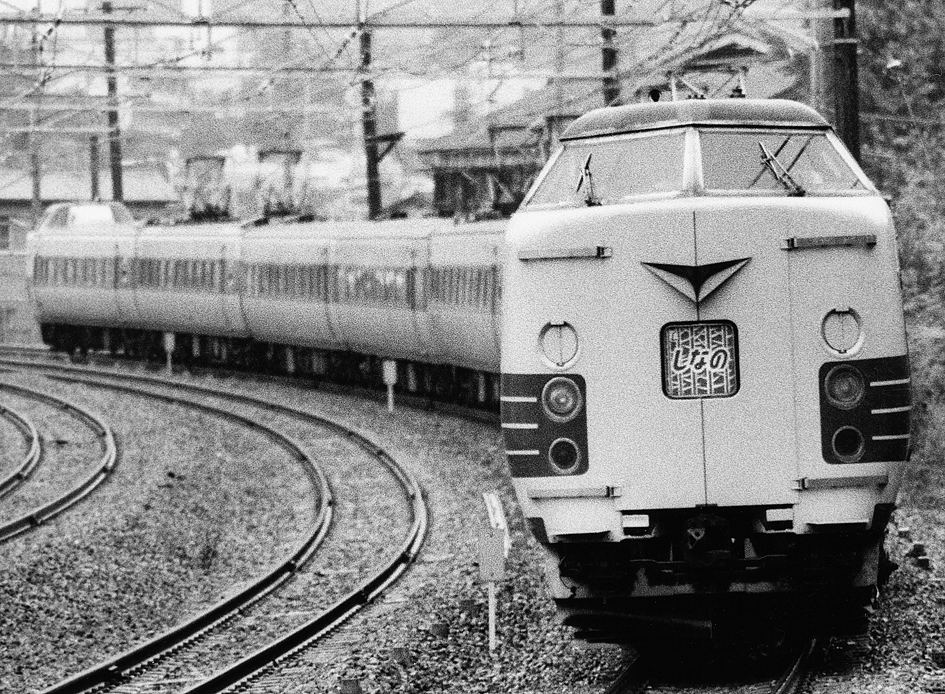
381-0 series train set on the Shinano service, 1983

The 381 series EMU was developed from the experimental 591 series 3-car articulated tilting EMU tested from 1970.

Trainsets entered revenue service from 10 July 1973 on the Shinano limited express between Nagoya and Nagano.

JR-West 381 series trains were removed from Kuroshio, Kounotori, Kinosaki, and Hashidate limited express services in October 2015, with the last services operating on 30 October.

As the new 273 series sets began service from 6 April 2024, it was announced by JR West in December 2023 that the remaining 381 series sets were scheduled to be retired from June 2024. The next sets to be retired were those repainted in various historic liveries; the sets sporting the Yuttari Yakumo livery were scheduled for retirement at a later date. The last regularly scheduled Yakumo run by this series took place on 15 June 2024 thus marking the end of regular service of the 381 series as a whole.

== Operations ==
=== JR Central ===
- Shinano (1973–May 2008)

=== JR West ===
- Kuroshio (from October 1978 until 30 October 2015)
- Yakumo (from July 1982 until 15 June 2024)
- Kounotori (until 31 May 2011, from 1 June 2012 until 30 October 2015)
- Kinosaki (from 1 June 2012 until 30 October 2015)
- Hashidate (from 16 March 2013 until 30 October 2015)
- Hanwa Liner rapid service (until March 2011)
- Yamatoji Liner rapid service (until March 2011)

== Livery variations ==
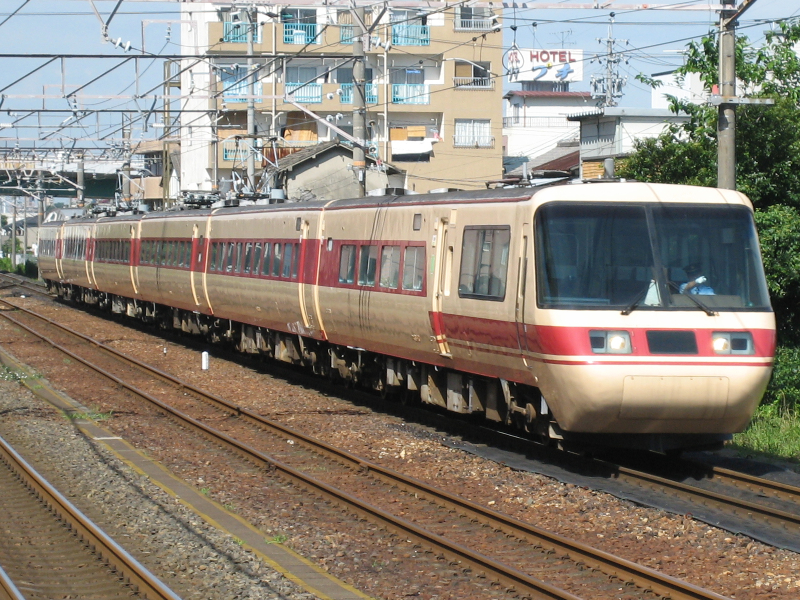
JNR Livery (JR Central Shinano set), July 2006

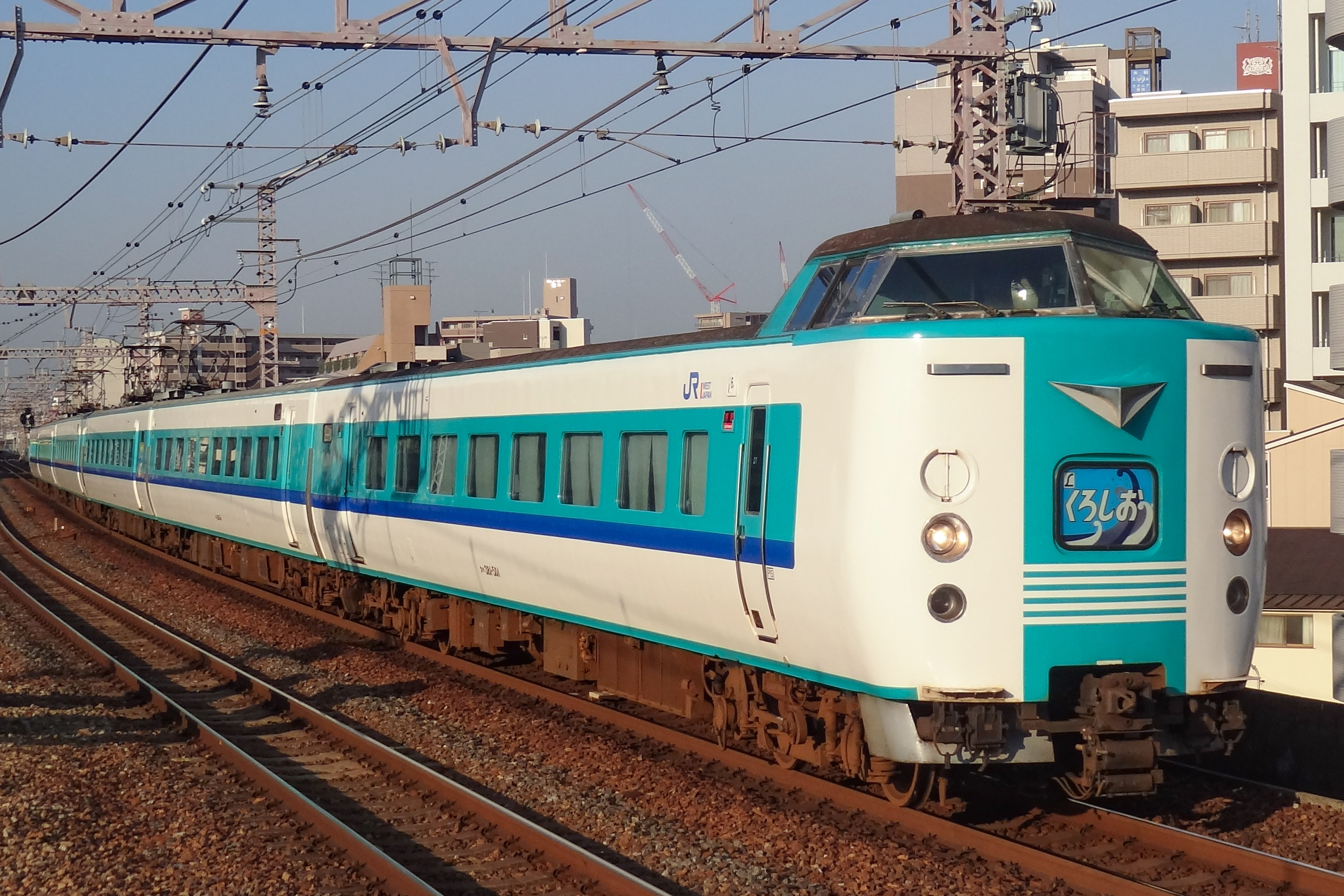
JR-West Kuroshio refurbished set

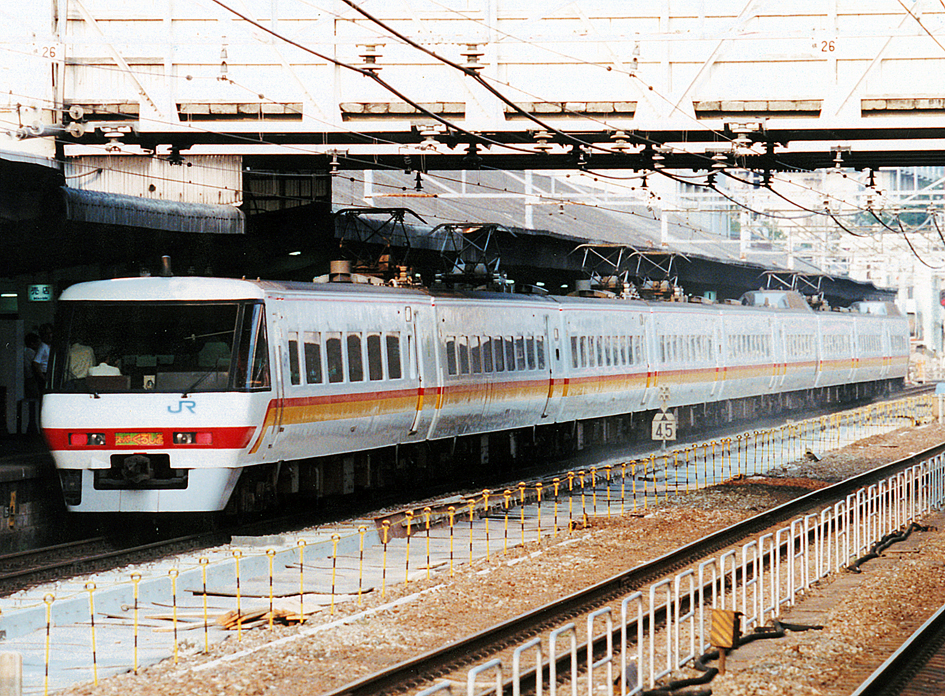
381 series Super Kuroshio set, 1992

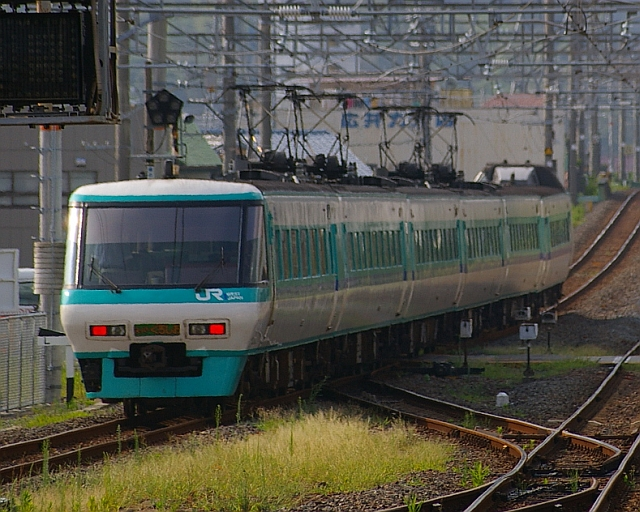
381 series Super Kuroshio KuRo 380 refurbished car

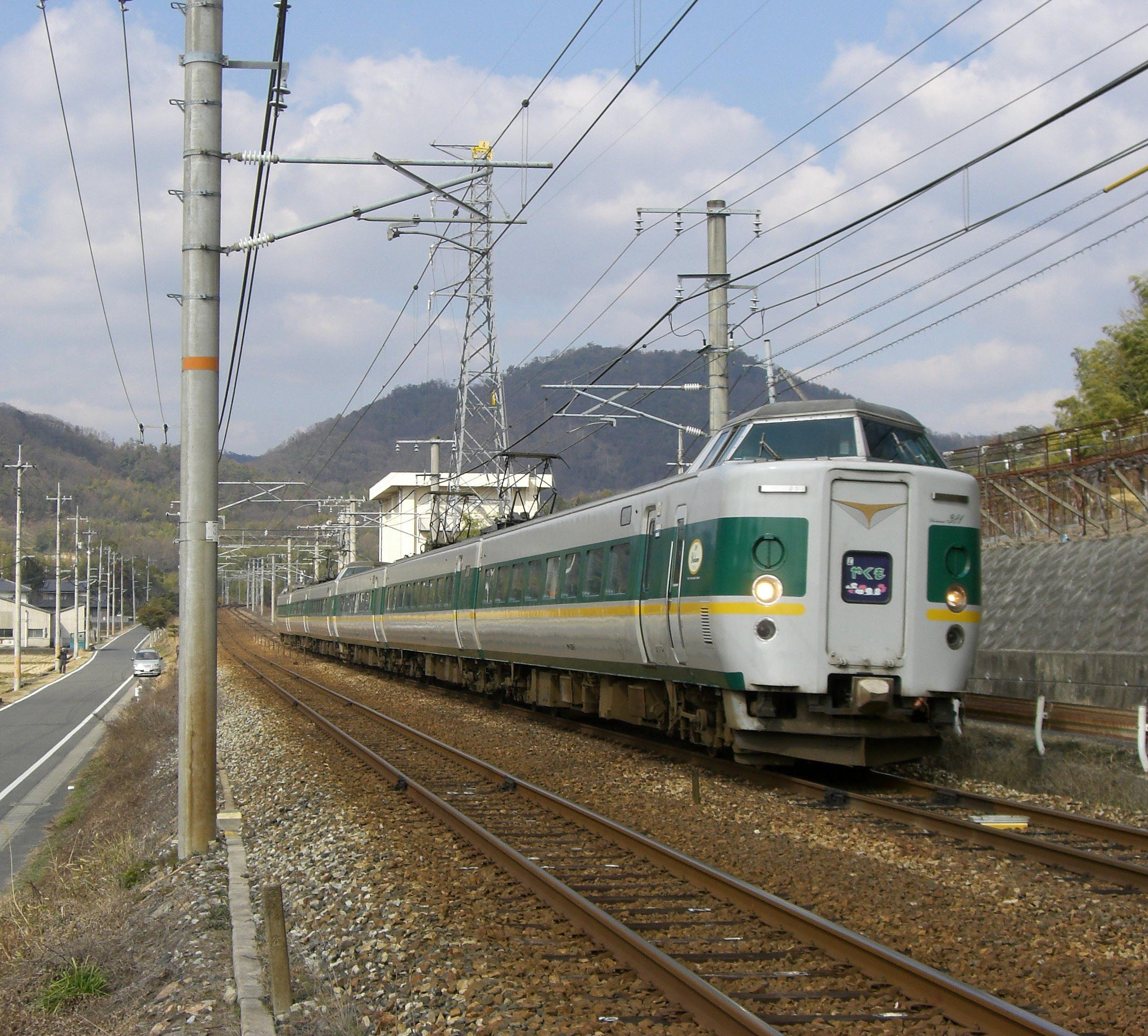
JR-West Yakumo set, July 2007

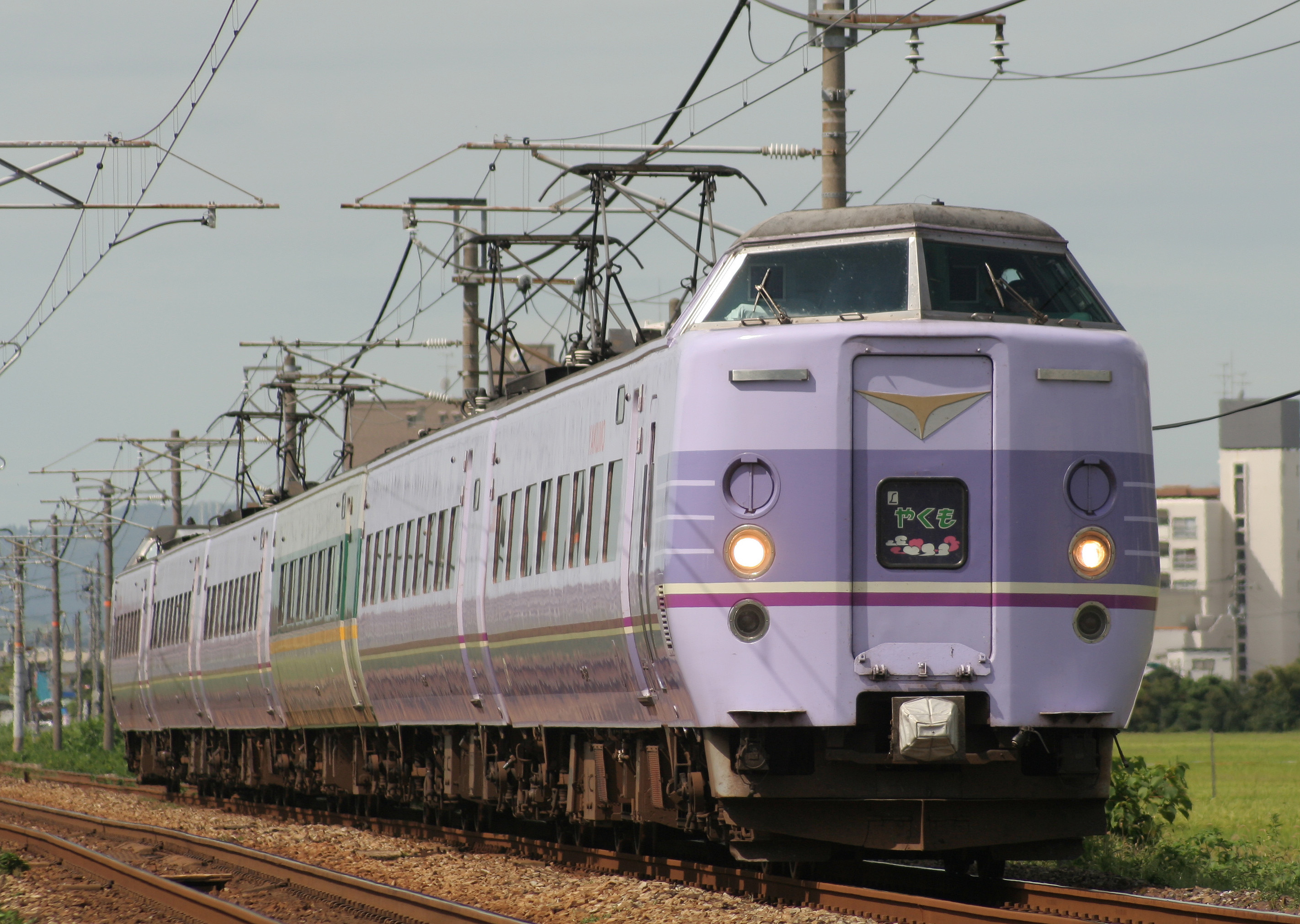
JR-West set in Super Yakumo livery, September 2007

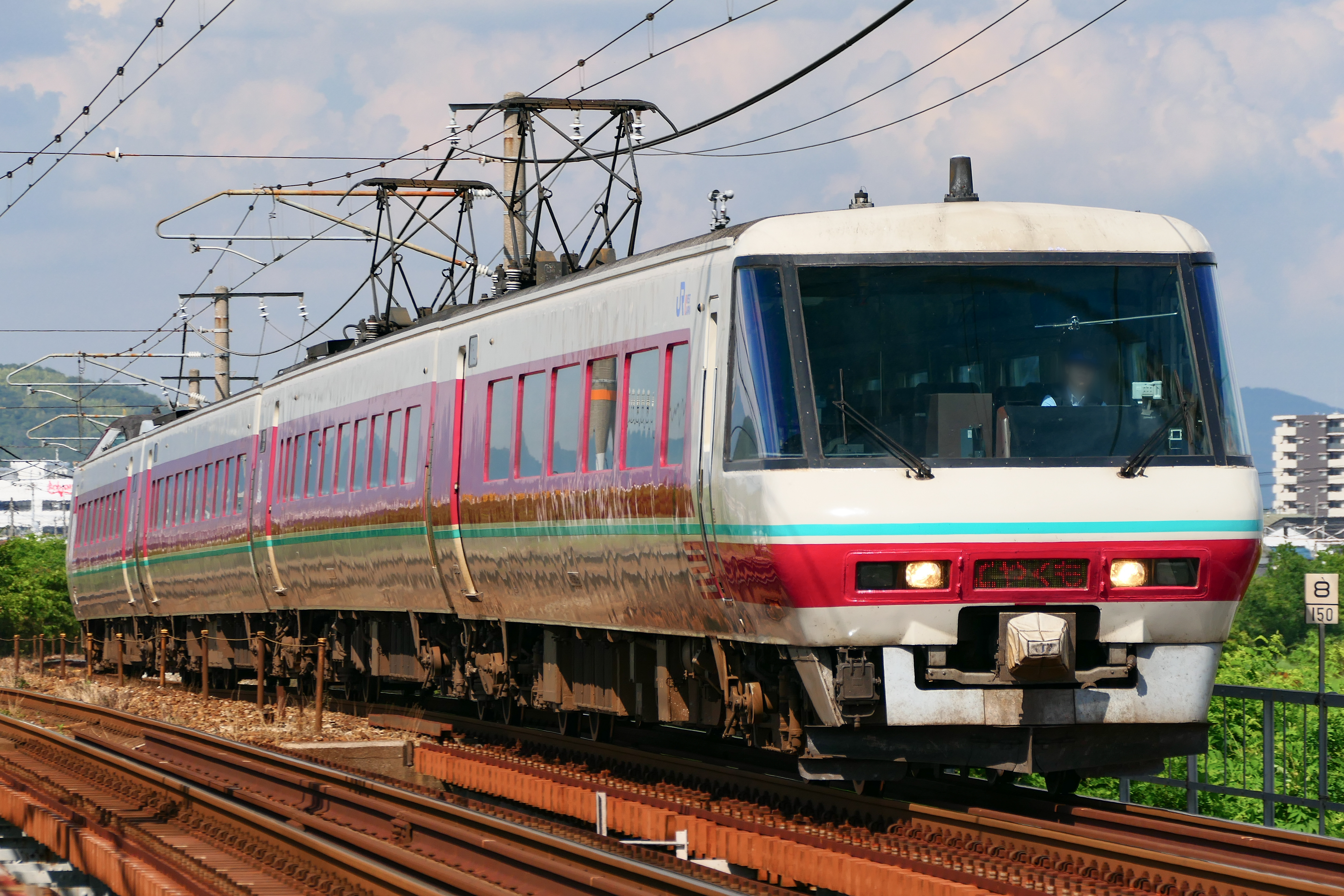
JR-West set in Yuttari Yakumo livery, July 2023

== Preserved examples ==
- KuHa 381-1: (built 1973 by Kawasaki Heavy Industries) SCMaglev and Railway Park, Nagoya.
- KuRo 381-11: (built 1974 by Kawasaki Heavy Industries) formerly at the SCMaglev and Railway Park, Nagoya, removed in June 2019.
- KuRo 381-1104: (built 1978 by Kawasaki Heavy Industries) Suita Depot, Osaka.
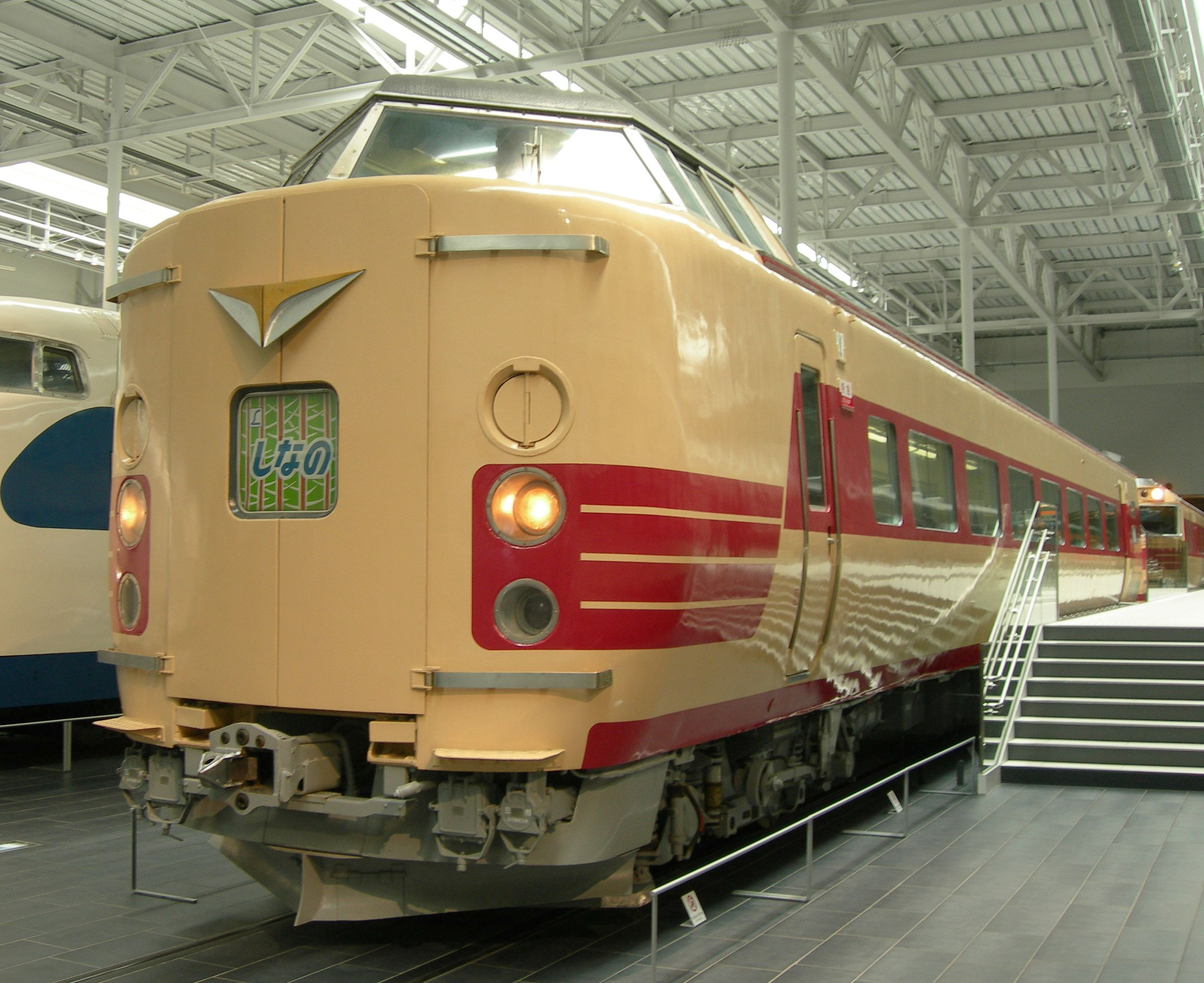
Preserved KuHa 381-1 at the SCMaglev and Railway Park, April 2011

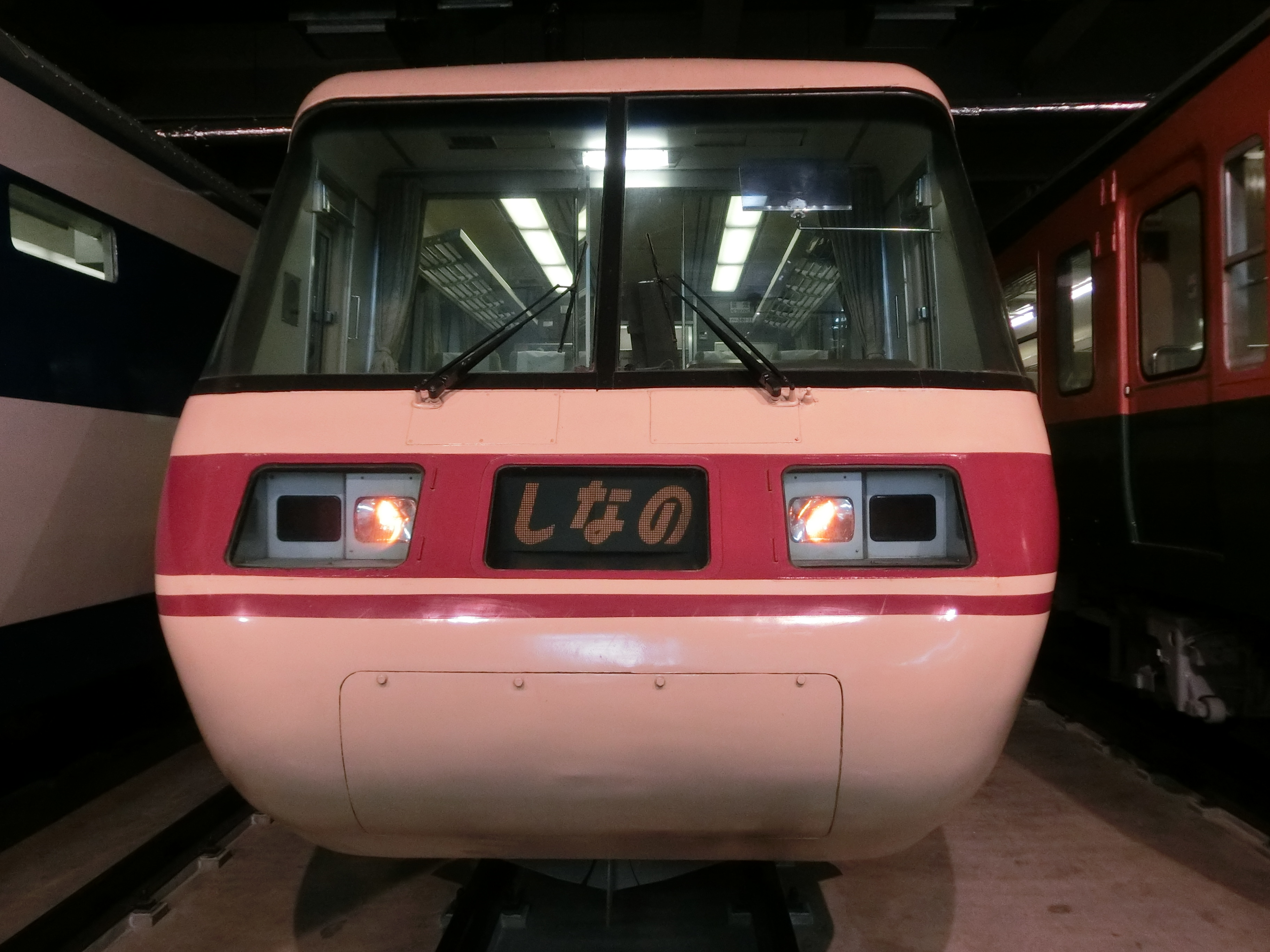
KuRo 381 at the SCMaglev and Railway Park, March 2016

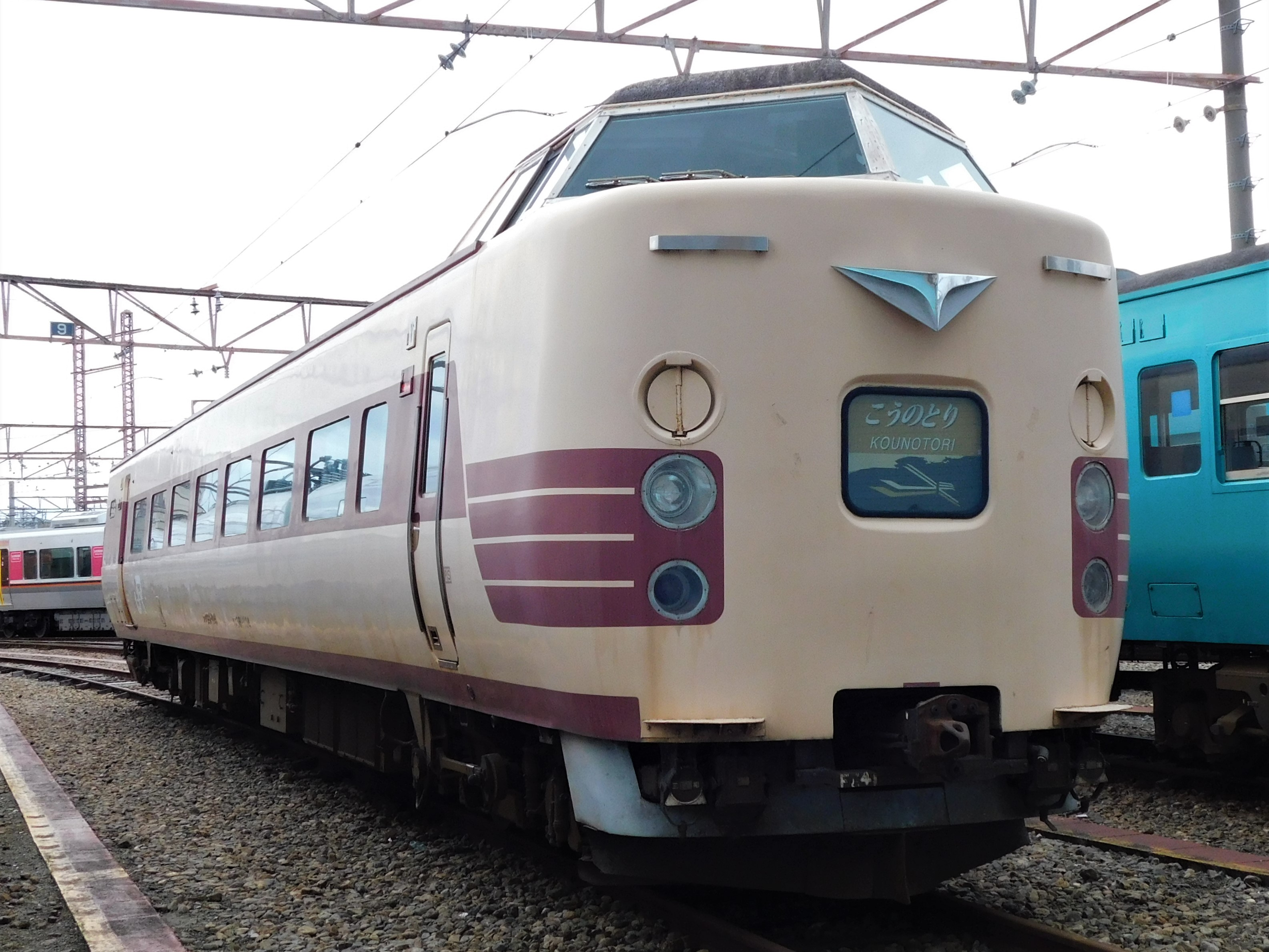
KuRo 381-1104 in May 2019
