= 273 series =

Japanese train type

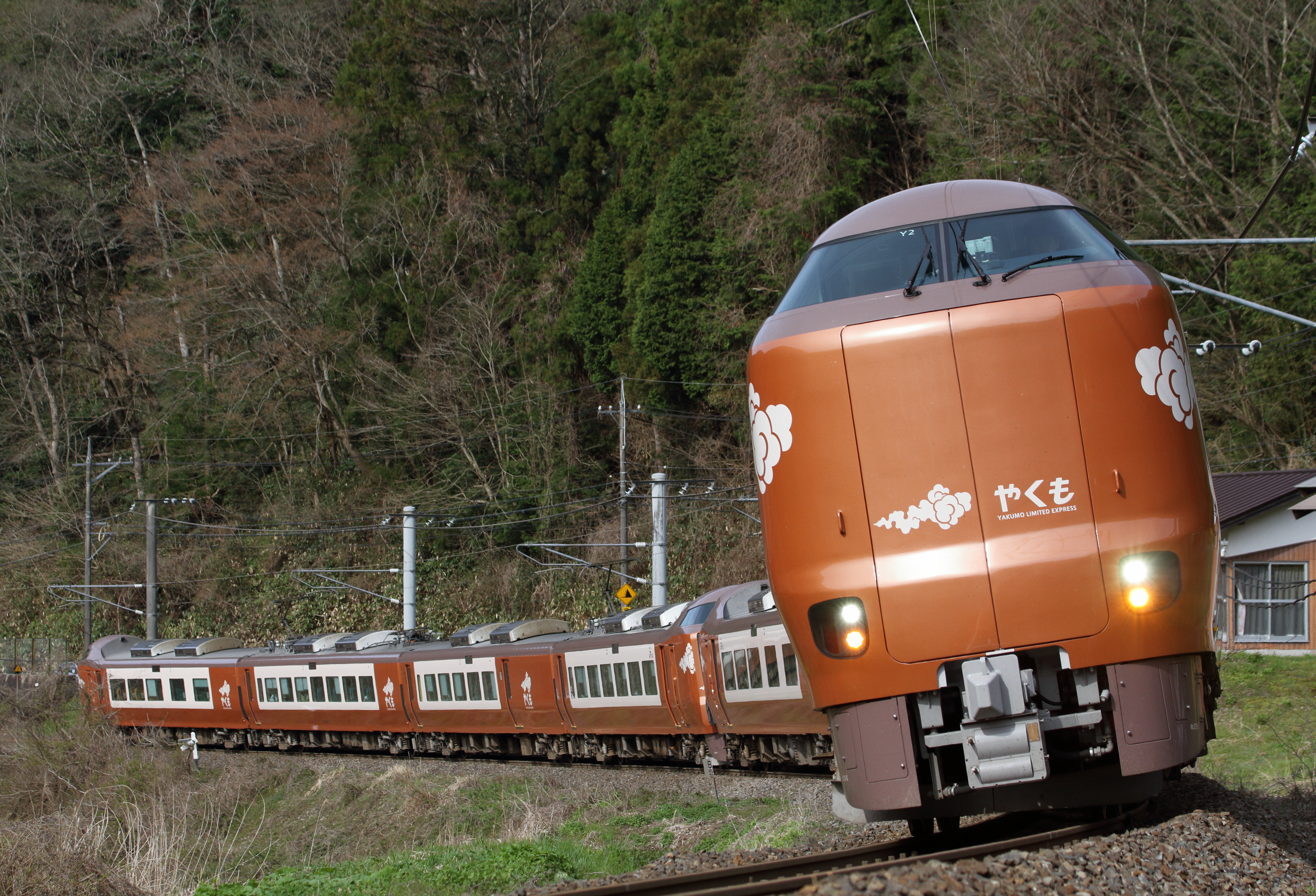
- Set Y2 in April 2024
- In service: 2024–present
- Manufacturer: Kinki Sharyo
- Replaced: 381 series
- Constructed: 2023–2024
- Entered service: 6 April 2024
- Number built: 44 vehicles (11 sets)
- Formation: 4 cars per trainset
- Fleet numbers: Y1–Y11
- Operator: JR West
- Lines served: Sanyo Main Line; Hakubi Line; Sanin Main Line

Specifications
- Traction system: Variable frequency
- Electric systems: 1,500 V DC (overhead catenary)
- Current collection: Pantograph
- Track gauge: 1,067 mm (3 ft 6 in)

Notes/references
- This train won the 68th Blue Ribbon Award in 2025.

The 273 series (273系) is a Japanese train type operated by West Japan Railway Company (JR West) on Yakumo limited express services on the Sanyo Main Line, Hakubi Line and Sanin Main Line. Announced on 16 February 2022, it has replaced the JNR-era 381 series.

== Design ==
Cars are painted in a bronze livery. The trains also feature a pendular tilting system which will be an improvement over the current 381 series trainsets. The tilting system is jointly developed by JR West, the Railway Technical Research Institute, and Kawasaki.

Each train set consists of four cars. Green (first class) cars feature transverse seating in a 1+2 configuration. Ordinary class cars also feature transverse seating except in a 2+2 configuration. In addition to the regular seating arrangement, there is a section reserved for tables.

The 273 series was listed in the Good Design Award's "Best 100" listing for 2024. The type is also a recipient of the 2025 Blue Ribbon Award.

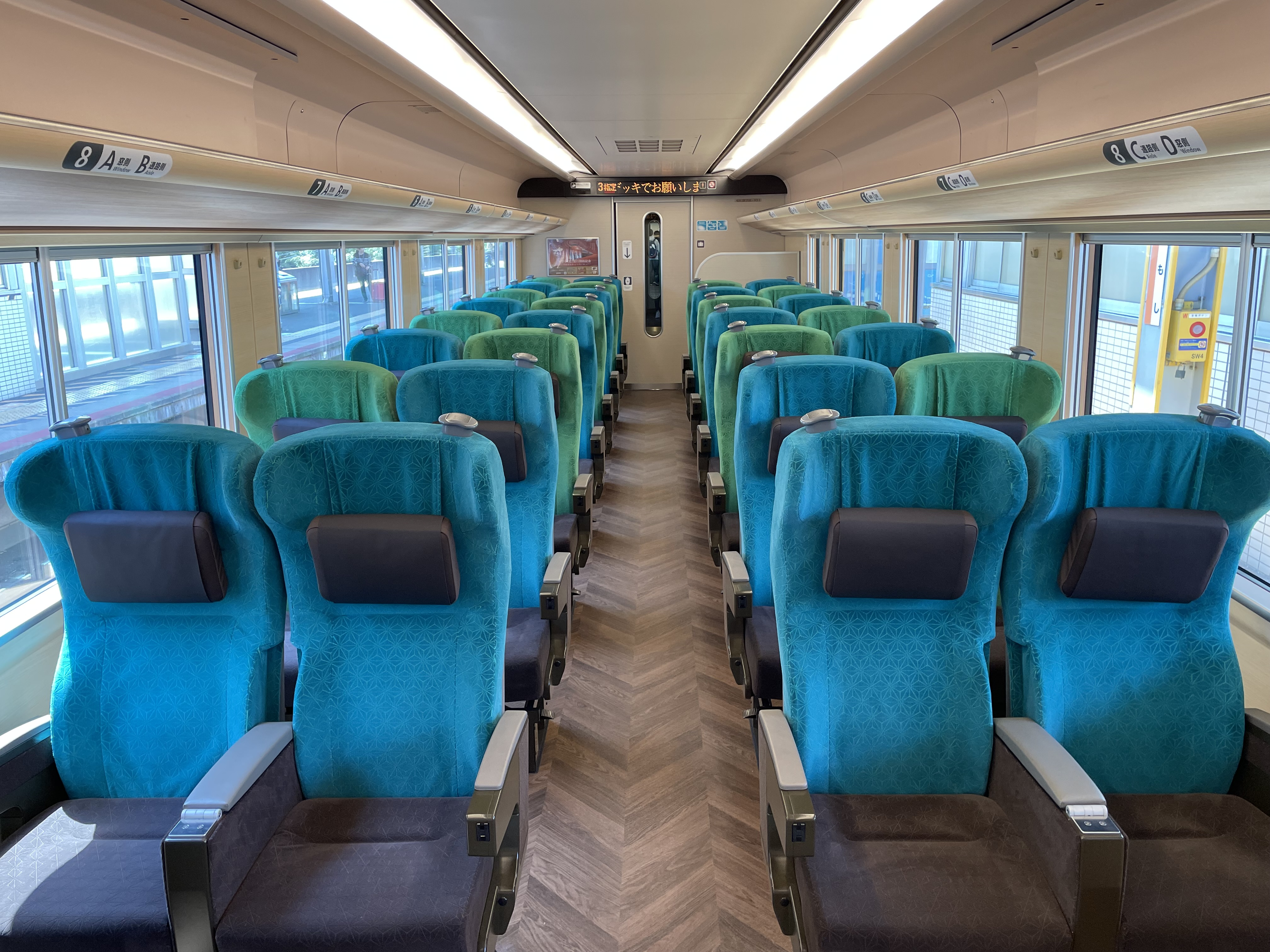
Standard class

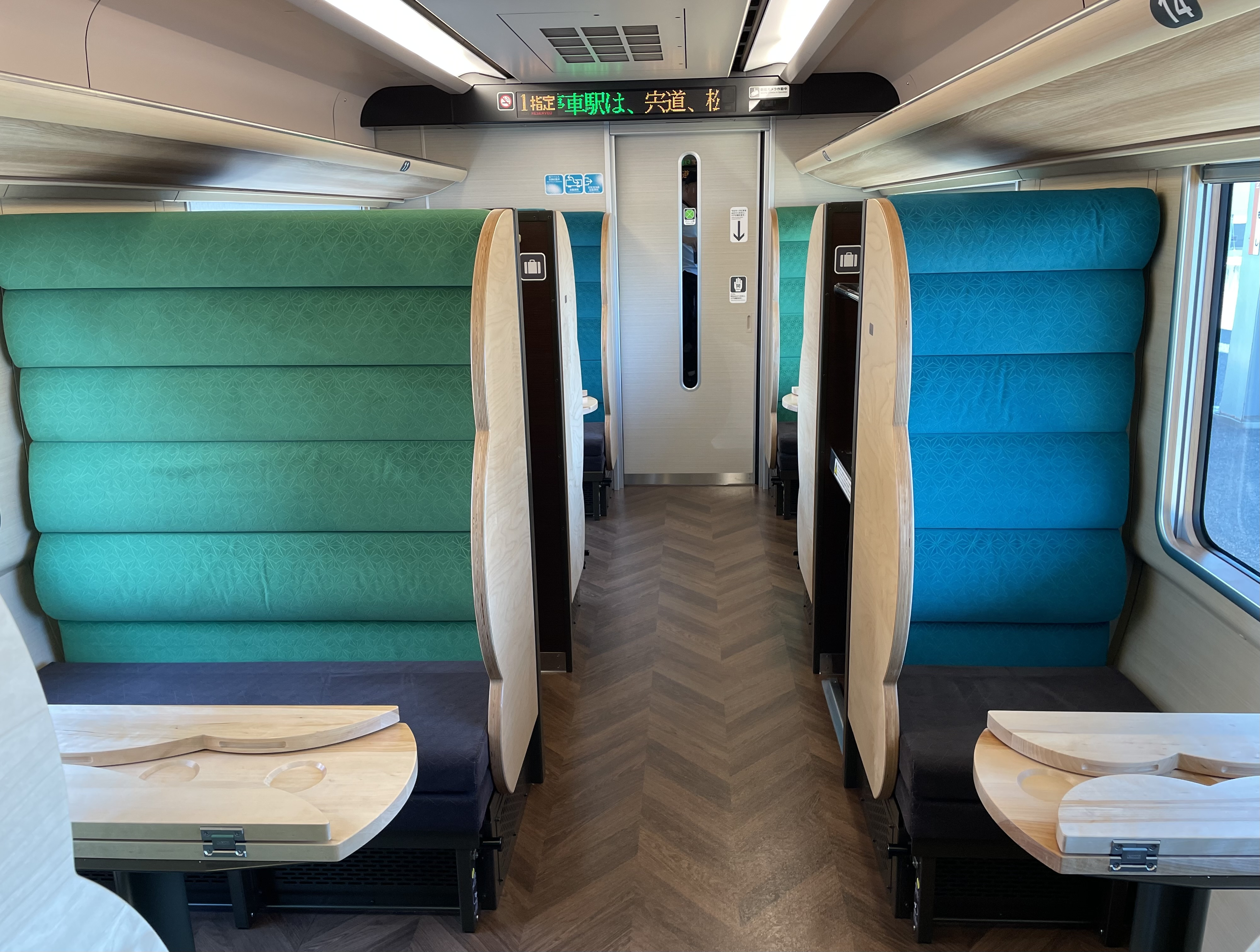
Compartment seating

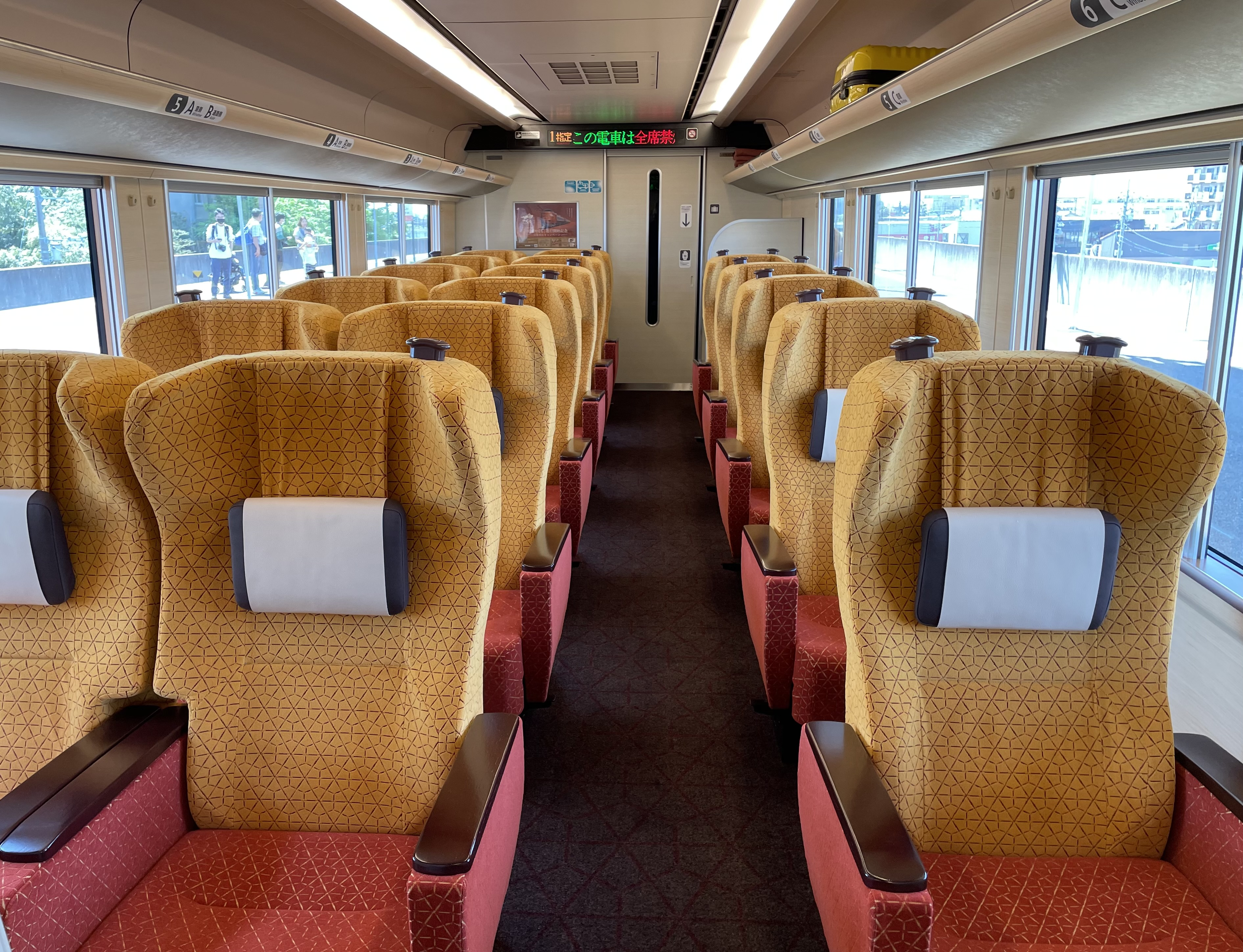
Green car

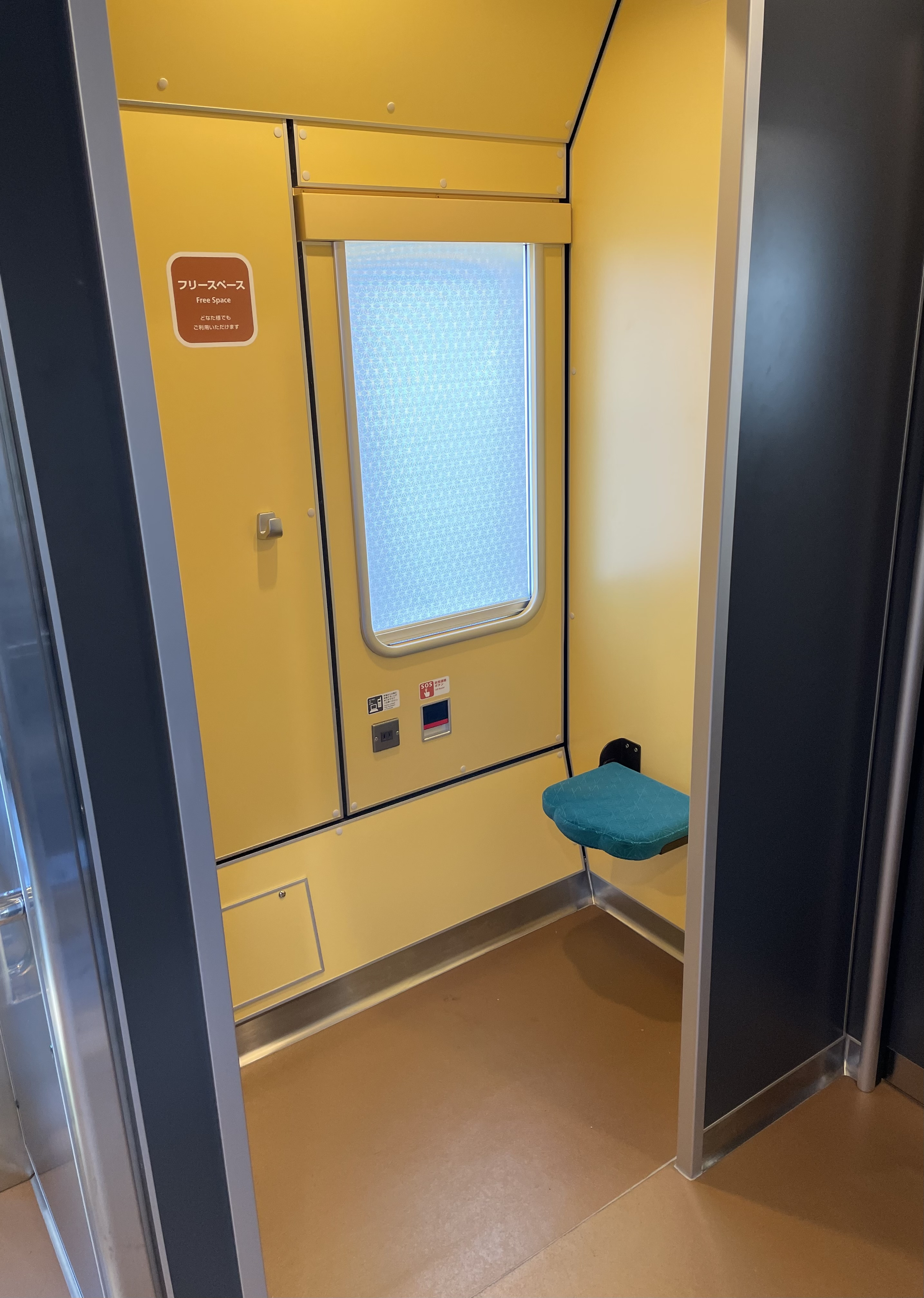
Free space

== History ==
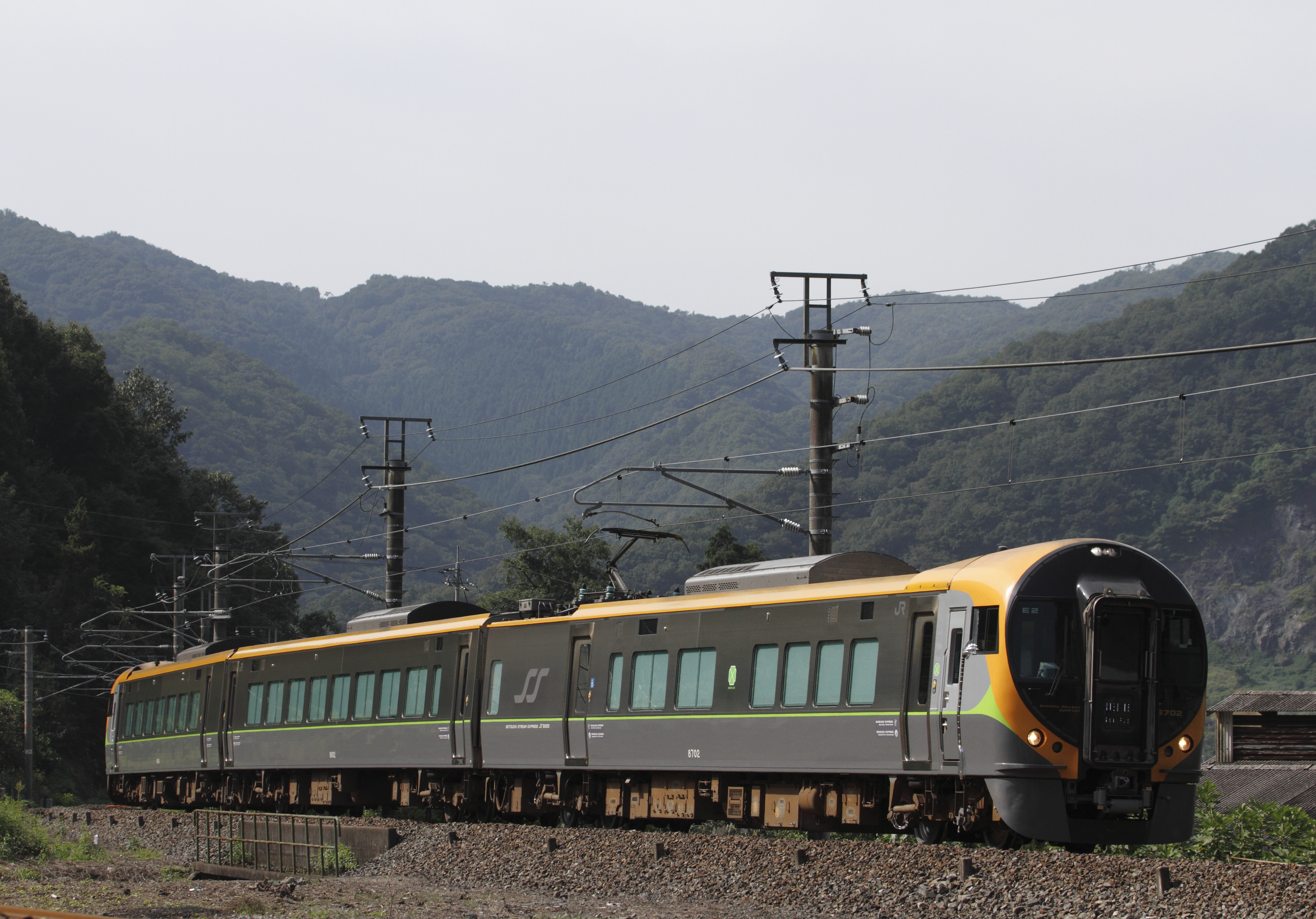
A JR Shikoku 8600 series train on test on the Hakubi Line, 2017

Plans existed as early as 2017 to introduce new rolling stock on Yakumo services to better compete with rival highway bus services. In July and September 2017, JR West leased two 8600 series EMUs from JR Shikoku to test the feasibility of pneumatic tilting on the Hakubi Line. However, the pneumatic tilting system proved unsuitable for the line, and it was decided that the new rolling stock would use a pendular tilting system instead.

On 30 October 2020, as part of its 2022 mid-term management plan, JR West formally announced its plans to introduce new rolling stock for the Yakumo. Details of the new trains, revealed to be classified as 273 series, were announced by JR West on 16 February 2022. Kinki Sharyo announced it would be responsible for manufacturing the trainsets on 7 March 2022.

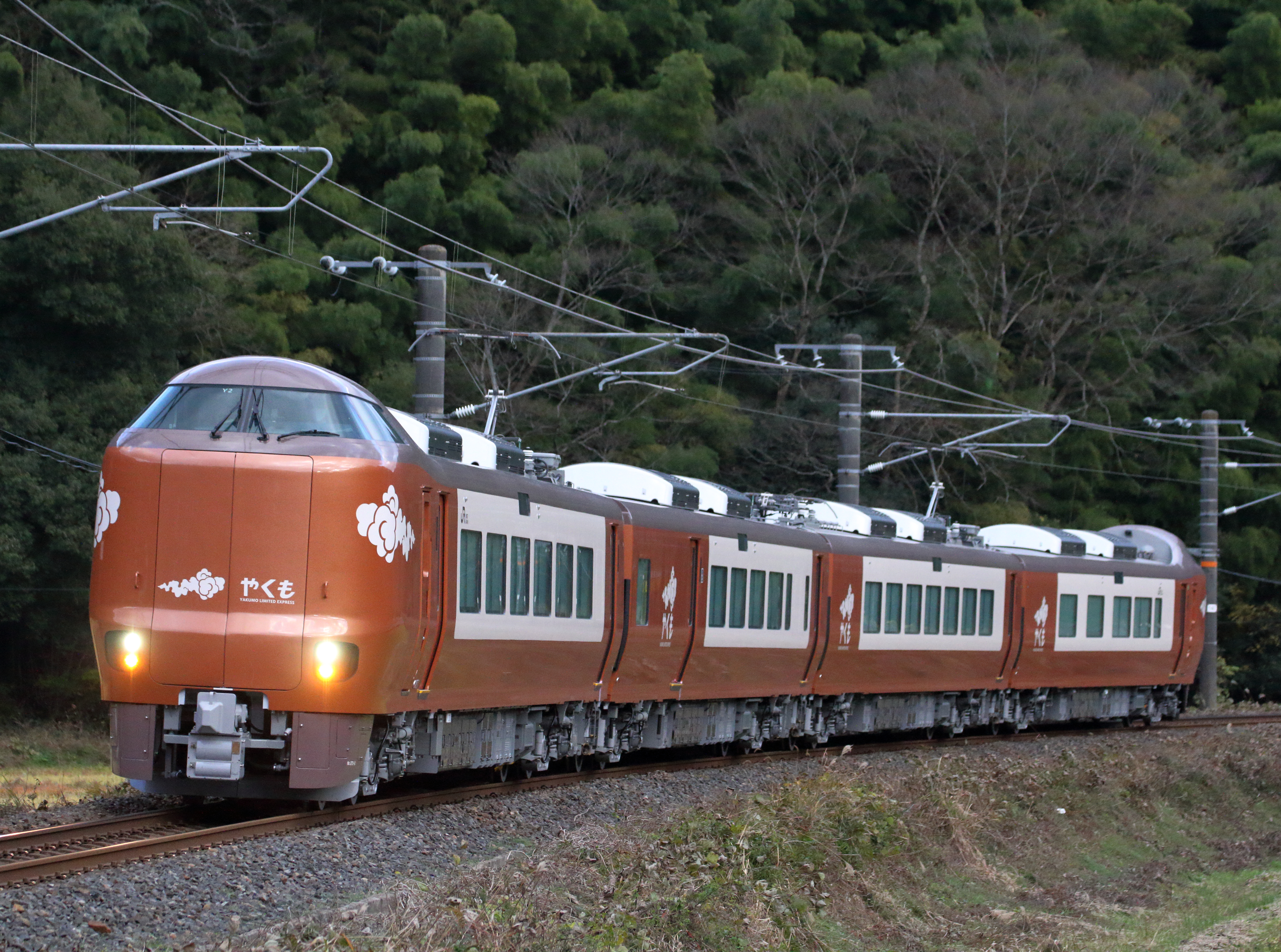
Set Y2 on test in December 2023

The first set, Y1, was unveiled on 17 October 2023, with test-running commencing alongside set Y2 from 25 October 2023. Sets Y3 and Y4 were assigned to test-running on 17 January 2024. Sets Y5 and Y6 were also spotted test-running on 28 February that same year. Y7 and Y8 were spotted testing on 4 April 2024.

The fleet was introduced into revenue service on 6 April 2024.

Set Y9 was delivered in late-April 2024, followed by sets Y10 and Y11, the final set, in May 2024.
