= Shiwachi Station =

Railway station in Miyoshi, Hiroshima Prefecture, Japan

Shiwachi Station 志和地駅
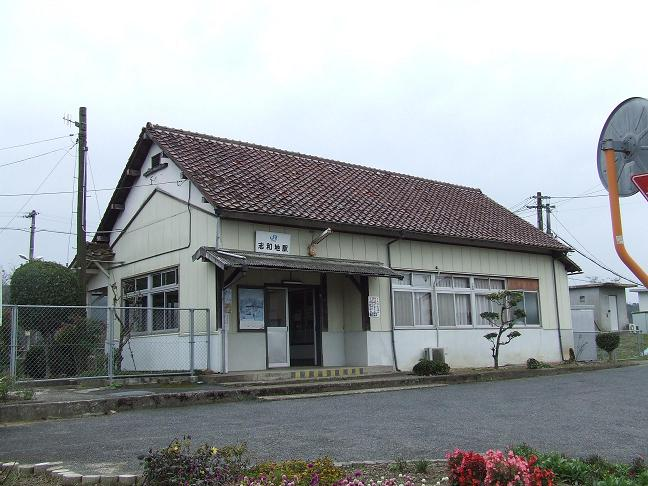
- Shiwachi Station, October 2011

General information
- Location: 710-1 Shimoshiwachi-chō, Miyoshi-shi, Hiroshima-ken 729-6331; Japan
- Coordinates: 34°44′25.71″N 132°48′14.11″E
- Owner: West Japan Railway Company
- Operator: West Japan Railway Company
- Line: P Geibi Line
- Distance: 99.6 km (61.9 miles) from Bitchū-Kōjiro
- Platforms: 1 island platform
- Tracks: 2
- Connections: Bus stop

Construction
- Accessible: Yes

Other information
- Status: Unstaffed
- Website: Official website

History
- Opened: 28 April 1915

Passengers
- FY2019: 33

Services
Preceding station	JR West	Following station
Kamikawatachi towards Hiroshima	Geibi Line Local	Nishi-Miyoshi towards Niimi
Location
- Location within Hiroshima Prefecture Location within Japan

Shiwachi Station (志和地駅, Shiwachi-eki) is a passenger railway station located in the city of Miyoshi, Hiroshima Prefecture, Japan. It is operated by the West Japan Railway Company (JR West). This station should not be confused with other stations of similar-sounding name on the Geibi Line: Shimowachi, Shiomachi, and Shiwaguchi.

== Lines ==
Shiwachi Station is served by the JR West Geibi Line, and is located 99.6 kilometers from the terminus of the line at Bitchū-Kōjiro and 9.3 kilometers from Miyoshi.

== Station layout ==
The station consists of one island platform connected to an old wooden building with a tile roof by a level crossing. The station is unattended. Tickets could be purchased at a shop in front of the station. This station was staffed until 2018.

=== Platforms ===
1	■ P Geibi Line	for Miyoshi and Bingo-Shōbara
2	■ P Geibi Line	for Shiwaguchi and Hiroshima

== History ==
Shiwachi Station was opened on 28 April 1915. With the privatization of the Japanese National Railways (JNR) on 1 April 1987, the station came under the control of JR West.

== Passenger statistics ==
In fiscal 2019, the station was used by an average of 33 passengers daily.

== Surrounding area ==
- Miyoshi Municipal Kawaji Elementary School
- Miyoshi Municipal Aokawa Elementary School
- Japan National Route 54

== See also ==
- List of railway stations in Japan
