= Nishi-Miyoshi Station =

Railway station in Miyoshi, Hiroshima Prefecture, Japan

Nishi-Miyoshi Station 西三次駅
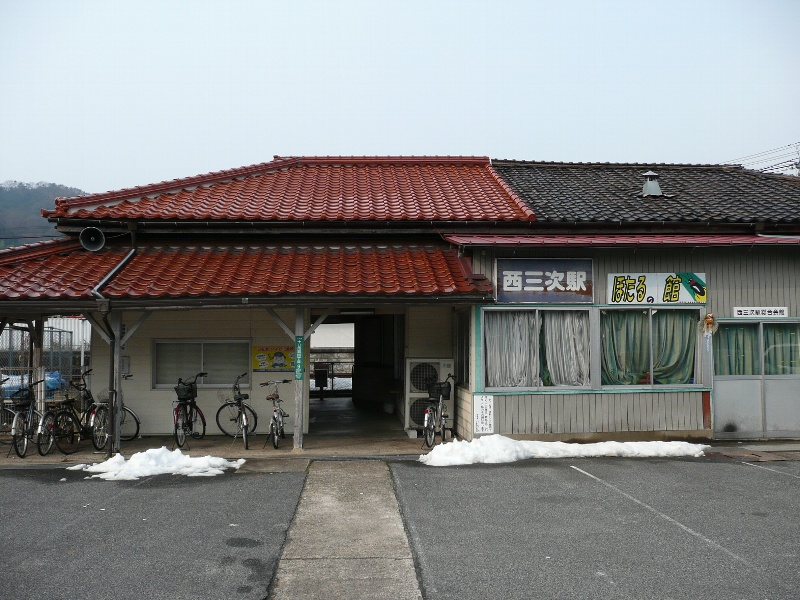
- Nishi-Miyoshi Station, January 2008, before demolition

General information
- Location: 4-chōme-9 Tōkaichinishi, Miyoshi-shi, Hiroshima-ken 728-0011; Japan
- Coordinates: 34°47′54.42″N 132°50′27.03″E
- Owner: West Japan Railway Company
- Operator: West Japan Railway Company
- Line: P Geibi Line
- Distance: 91.9 km (57.1 miles) from Bitchū-Kōjiro
- Platforms: 1 island platform
- Tracks: 2
- Connections: Bus stop

Construction
- Accessible: Yes

Other information
- Status: Unstaffed
- Website: Official website

History
- Opened: 1 June 1915
- Former names: Miyoshi (to 1954)

Passengers
- FY2019: 33

Services
Preceding station	JR West	Following station
Shiwachi towards Hiroshima	Geibi Line Local	Miyoshi towards Niimi
Location
- Location within Hiroshima Prefecture Location within Japan

Nishi-Miyoshi Station (西三次駅, Nishi-miyoshi-eki) is a passenger railway station located in the city of Miyoshi, Hiroshima Prefecture, Japan. It is operated by the West Japan Railway Company (JR West). The station was originally opened to serve residents on the north bank of the Saijō River in the former Miyoshi town in Futami District.

== Lines ==
Nishi-Miyoshi Station is served by the JR West Geibi Line, and is located 91.9 kilometers from the terminus of the line at Bitchū-Kōjiro and 1.6 kilometers from Miyoshi.

== Station layout ==
The station consists of one island platform, formerly connected to a wooden station building dating from the opening of the line in 1915 by a level crossing. It used to have a cargo yard, and a siding was laid to the Hiroshima Prefectural Federation of Economic and Agricultural Cooperatives and Nippon Oil. There was also a forage depot adjacent to it, from which it also handled cargo. After the cargo handling was abolished, most of the siding tracks were removed. Around the beginning of February 2021, the station building was dismantled, and benches and ticket collection boxes were installed. Before the station, the building was dismantled, it was used as a gathering place for local residents and as an event plaza. The station is unattended.

=== Platforms ===
1	■ P Geibi Line	for Miyoshi and Bingo-Shōbara
2	■ P Geibi Line	for Shiwaguchi and Hiroshima

== History ==
Nishi-Miyoshi Station was opened on 1 June 1915 as Miyoshi Station (三次駅). It was renamed 10 November 1954. With the privatization of the Japanese National Railways (JNR) on 1 April 1987, the station came under the control of JR West.

== Passenger statistics ==
In fiscal 2019, the station was used by an average of 3 passengers daily.

== Surrounding area ==
- Miyoshi Municipal Awaya Elementary School

== See also ==
- List of railway stations in Japan
