= Bingo-Saijō Station =

Railway station in Shōbara, Hiroshima Prefecture, Japan

Bingo-Saijō Station 備後西城駅
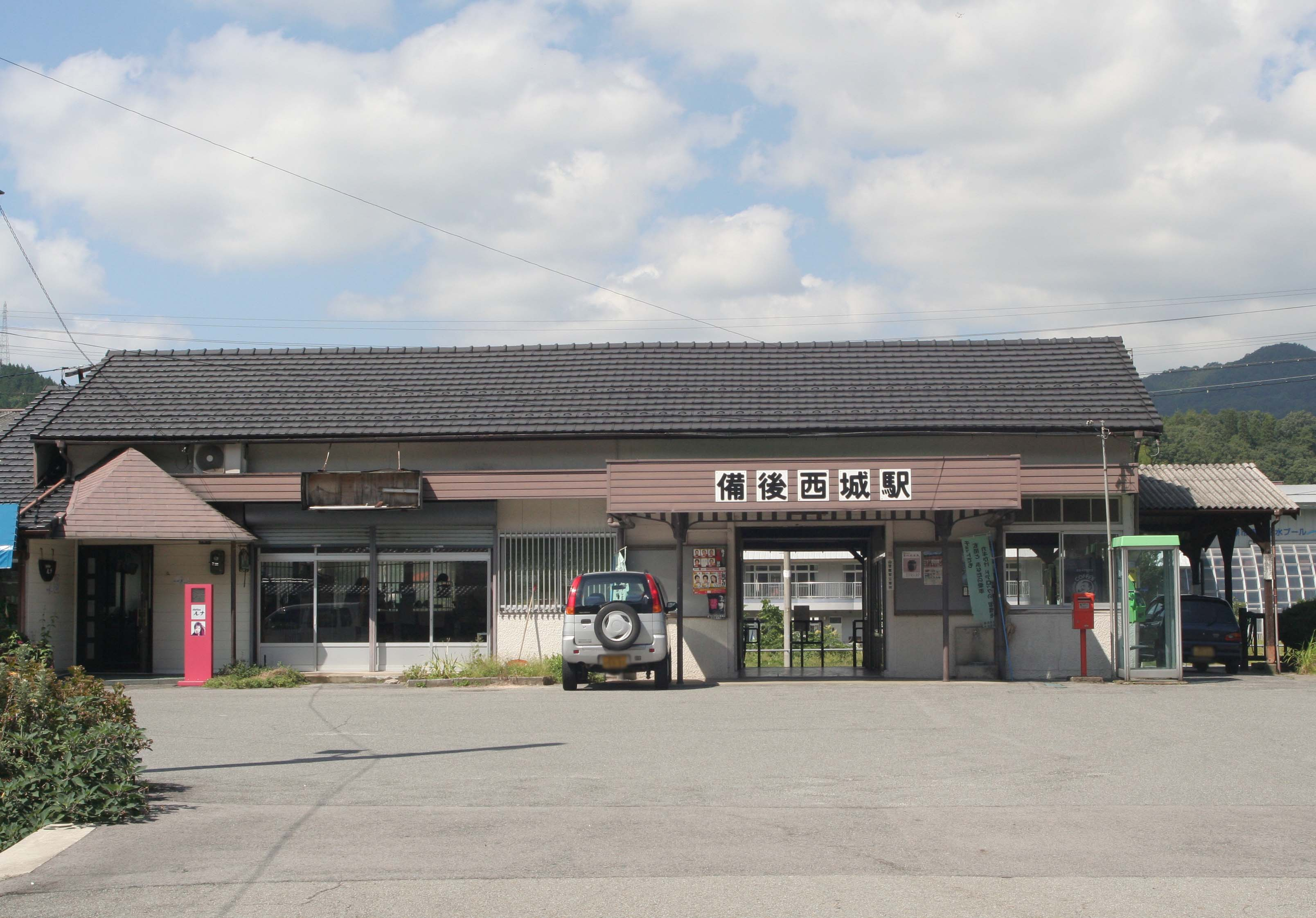
- Bingo-Saijō Station in 2007

General information
- Location: 72-3Ōsa, Saijō-chō, Shōbara-shi, Hiroshima-ken 729-5722; Japan
- Coordinates: 34°56′25.37″N 133°7′11.67″E
- Operator: JR West
- Line: P Geibi Line
- Distance: 53.2 km (33.1 miles) from Bitchū-Kōjiro
- Platforms: 2 side platform
- Tracks: 2

Other information
- Status: Staffed
- Website: Official website

History
- Opened: 15 March 1934

Passengers
- 2019: 36 daily

Services
Preceding station	JR West	Following station
Hirako towards Hiroshima	Geibi Line Local	Hibayama towards Niimi
Location
- Location within Hiroshima Prefecture Location within Japan

Bingo-Saijō Station (備後西城駅, Bingo-Saijō-eki) is a passenger railway station located in Ōsa, Saijō-chō, in the city of Shōbara, Hiroshima Prefecture, Japan. It is operated by the West Japan Railway Company (JR West).

== Lines ==
Bingo-Saijō Station is served by the Geibi Line, and is located 53.2 kilometers from the terminus of the line at Bitchū-Kōjiro and 59.6 kilometers from Niimi.

== Station layout ==
The station consists of two ground-level opposed side platforms. The station building is located on the side of the platform for Miyoshi Station, and the platform for Bingo-Ochiai Station on the other side is connected by a level crossing. The station is staffed.

=== Platforms ===
1	■ P Geibi Line	for Miyoshi Hiroshima
2	■ P Geibi Line	for Bingo-Ochiai

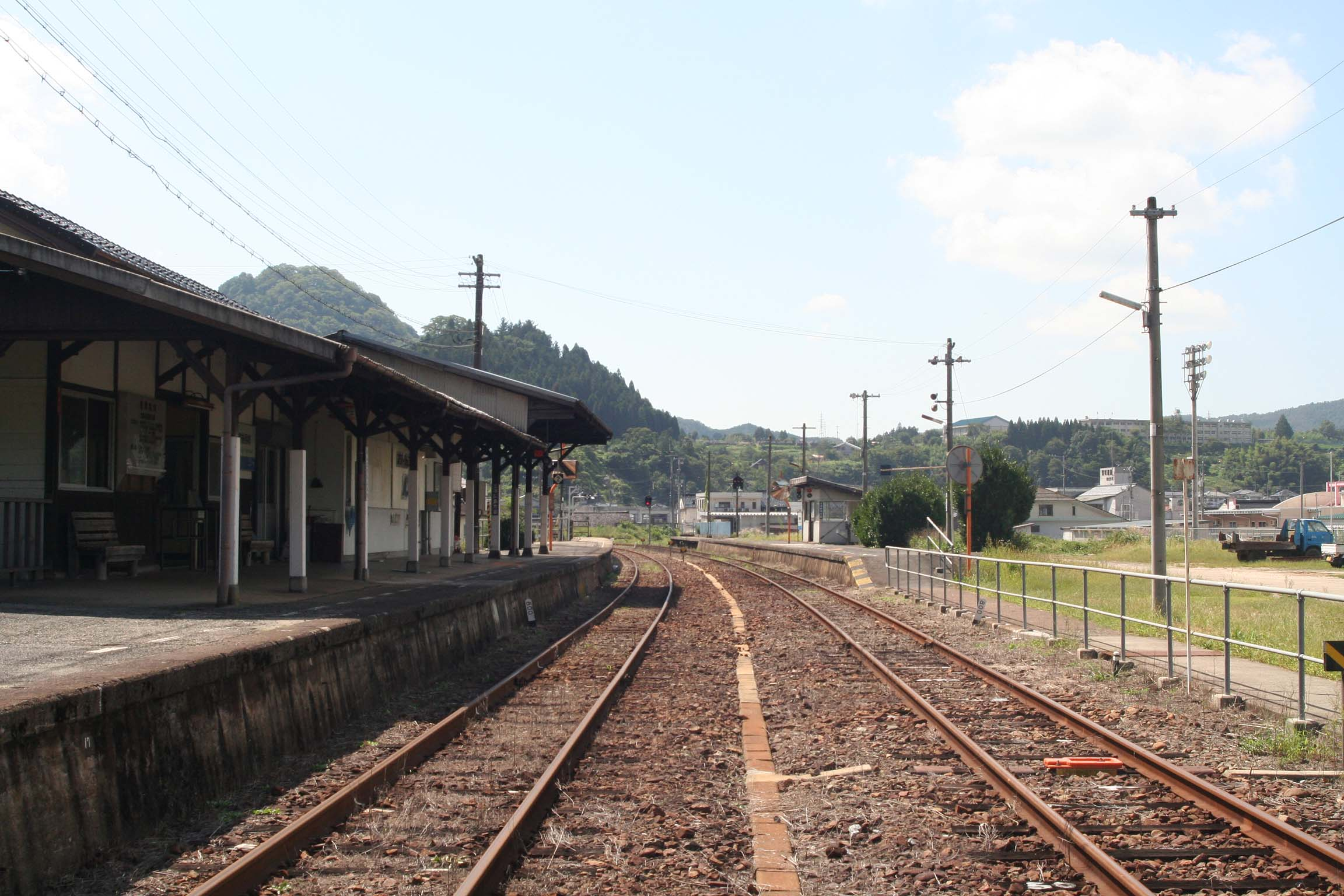
enclosure (2007)

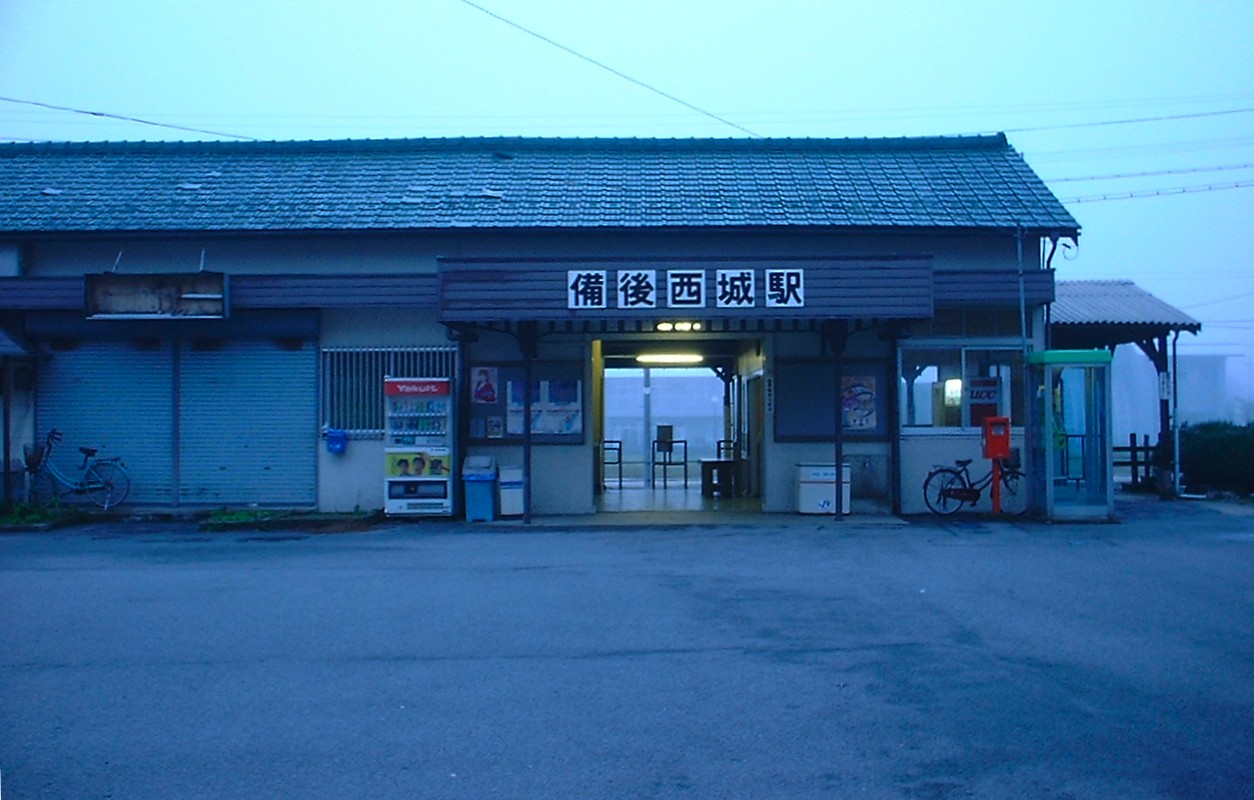
Bingo-Saijō Station in the foggy early morning (2000)

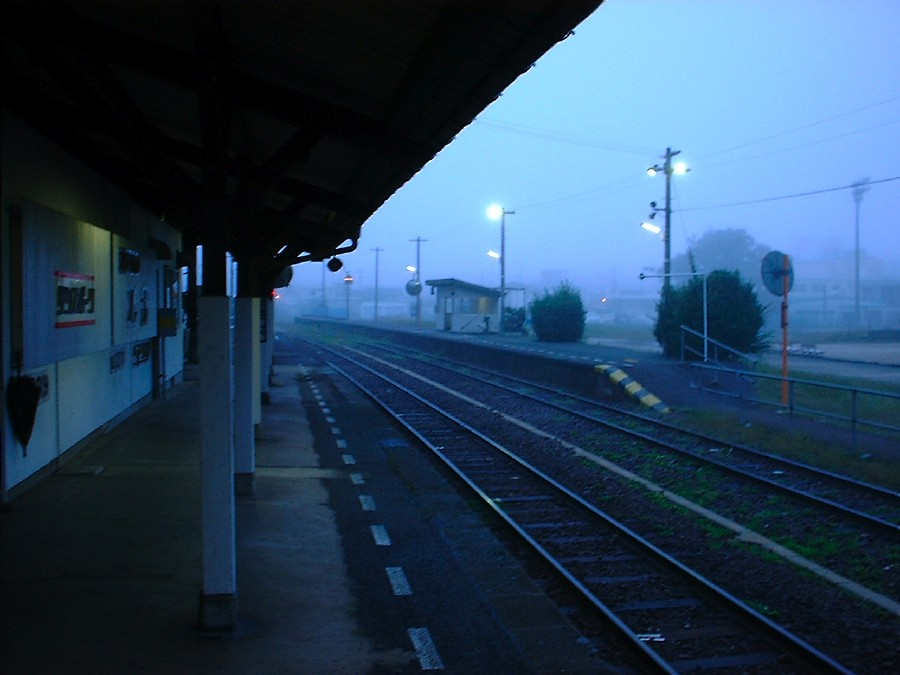
Bingo-Saijō Station looking toward Miyoshi Station (2000)

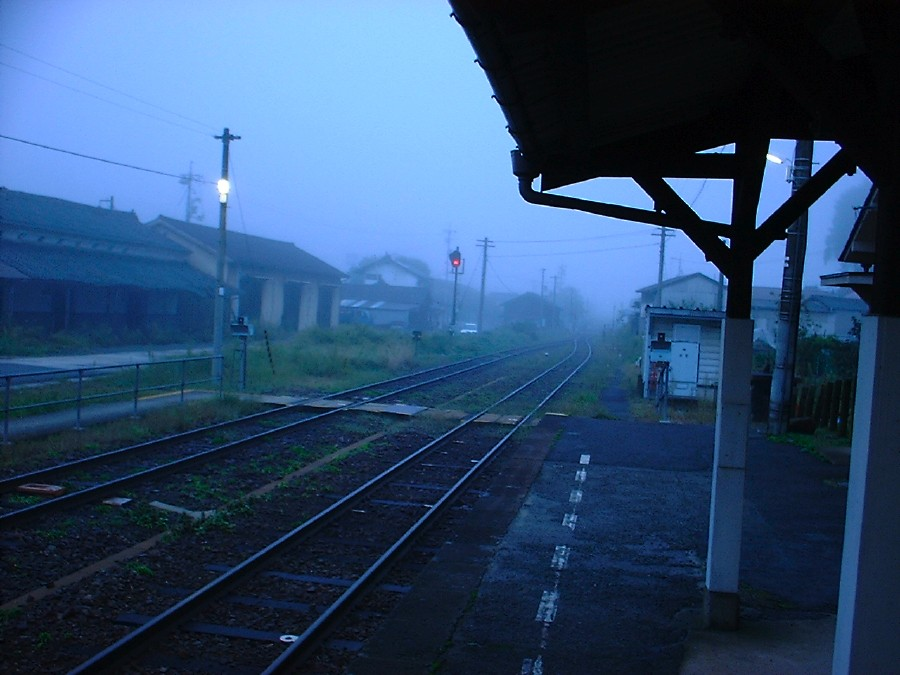
Bingo-Saijō Station looking toward Bingo Ochiai Station (2000)

== History ==
Bingo-Saijō Station was opened on March 15, 1934 as a terminal station of the Sanshin line to Yagami Station. The station became a through station on June 15, 1935 when the extension towards Onuka Station was opened. Service was renamed to the Geibi Line on July 1, 1937. It became part of JR West in 1987 when Japan National Railways was privatized.

== Passenger statistics ==
In fiscal 2019, the station was used by an average of 36 passengers daily.

== Surrounding area ==
- Shobara City Hall Saijo Branch office
- Shobara Municipal Saijo Elementary School
- Shobara Municipal Saijo Junior High School
- Hiroshima Prefectural Saijo Shisui High School
- Shobara Municipal Saijo Municipal Hospital

== See also ==
- List of railway stations in Japan
