= Hiroshima City Network =

Rail lines in Japan

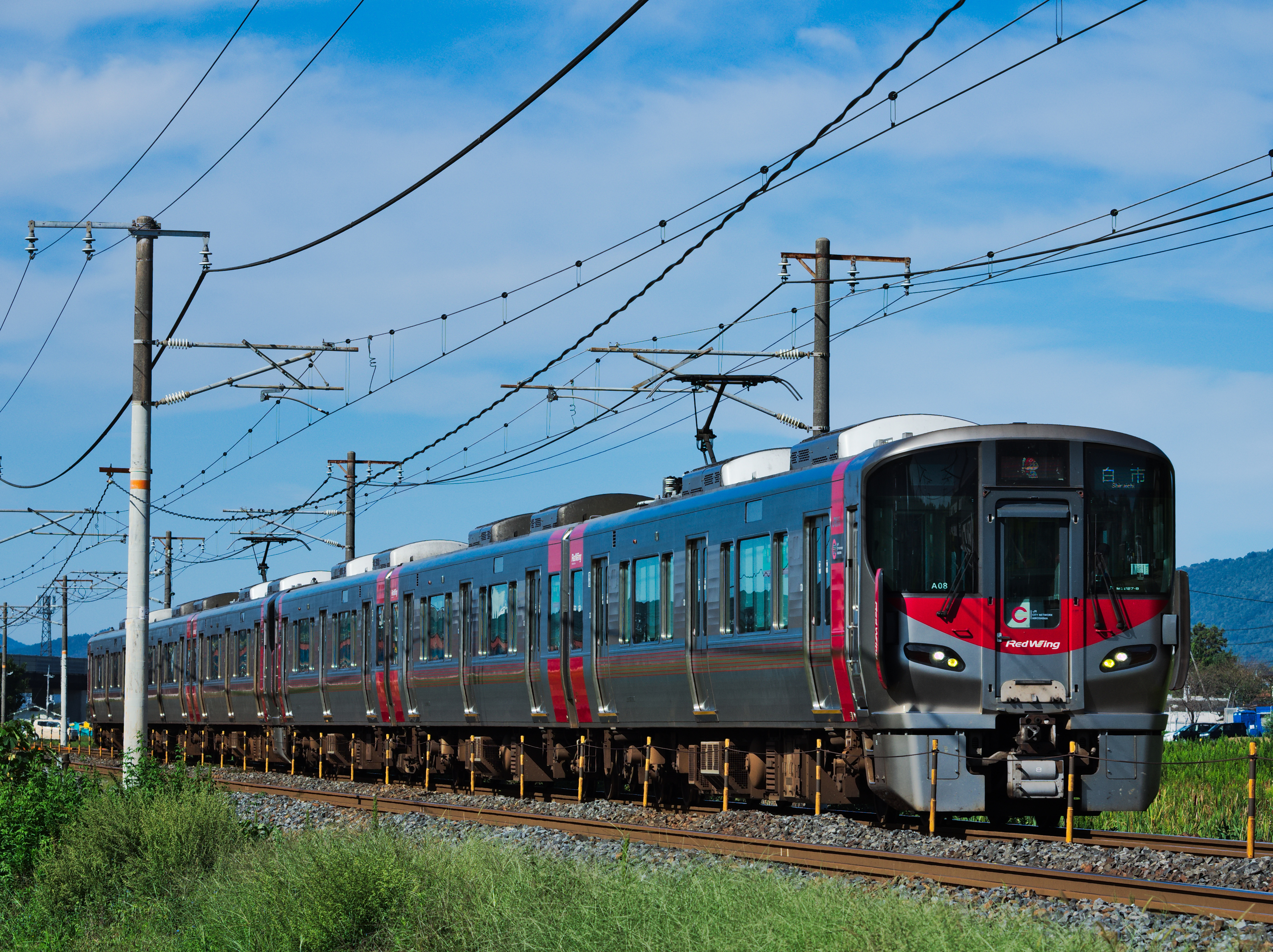
227 series A08 20170921

The Hiroshima City Network (広島シティネットワーク, Hiroshima Shiti Nettowāku) is the common name for the JR West rail lines in the Hiroshima metropolitan area. The network was created on October 5, 2002, and modeled after the Urban Network in the Kyōto-Osaka-Kōbe area of Japan. Unlike the Urban Network, the Hiroshima City Network was not created in order to serve the suburbs and surrounding environs of a large city, but rather to service primarily stations within 30–40 minutes of Hiroshima Station.

Between Hiroshima Station and Kaitaichi Station (which is quadruple-track), the outside two tracks are exclusively for passenger trains, while the inside two tracks are used primarily for freight trains, allowing for expansion of the use by passenger trains according to demand.

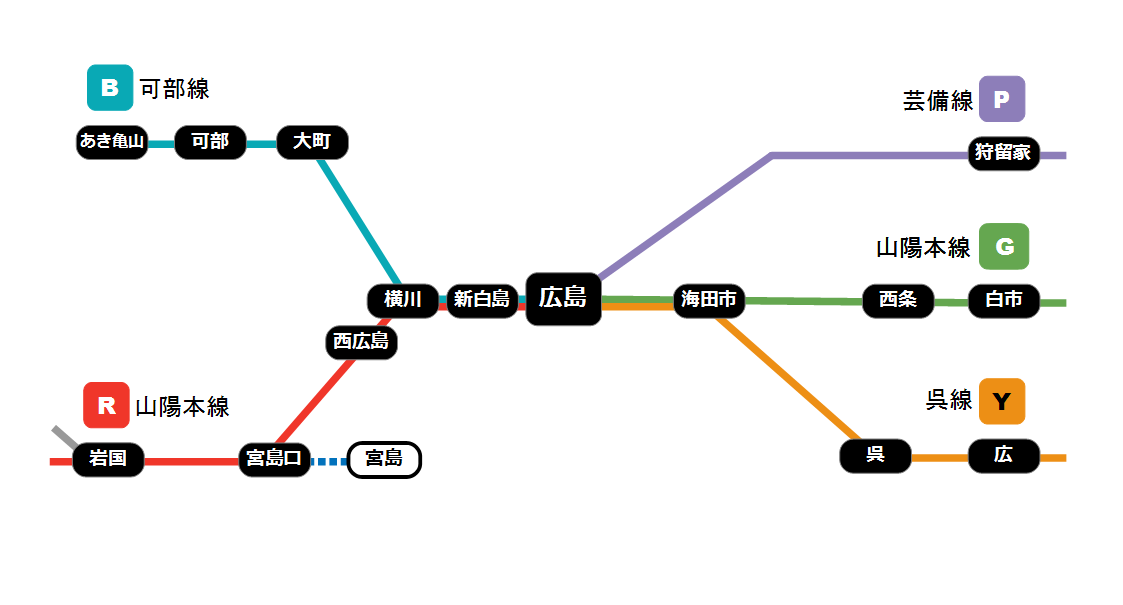
Line colors and icons of the Hiroshima City Network

List of the Hiroshima City Network lines
Line	Icon	Route
San'yō Line	G	Shiraichi - Hiroshima
San'yō Line	R	Hiroshima - Iwakuni
Kure Line	Y	Hiro - Kaitaichi - Hiroshima
Kabe Line	B	Hiroshima - Yokogawa - Aki-Kameyama
Geibi Line	P	Karuga - Hiroshima
