= Yamanouchi Station =

Yamanouchi Station (山ノ内駅, Yamanouchi Eki) can refer to:

- Yamanouchi Station (Hiroshima), a train station on JR West's Geibi Line
- Yamanouchi Station (Kyoto), a train station on Keifuku Electric Railroad's Arashiyama Main Line
