= Dōgoyama Station =

Railway station in Shōbara, Hiroshima Prefecture, Japan

Dōgoyama Station 道後山駅
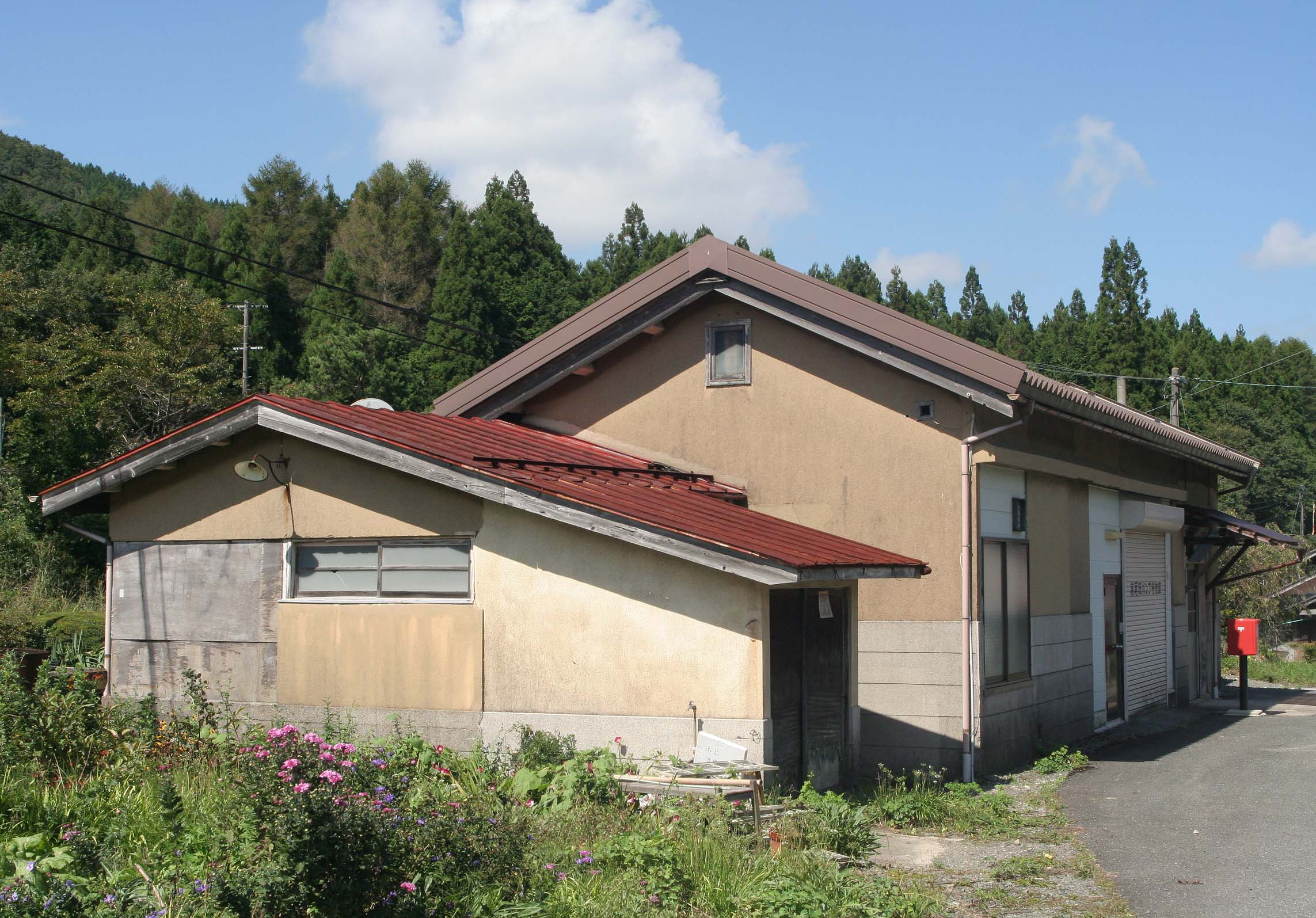
- Dōgoyama Station (September 2007)

General information
- Location: Takao, Saijō-chō, Shōbara-shi, Hiroshima-ken 729-5612; Japan
- Coordinates: 35°0′39.22″N 133°10′41.77″E
- Operator: JR West
- Line: P Geibi Line
- Distance: 37.8 km (23.5 miles) from Bitchū-Kōjiro
- Platforms: 1 side platform
- Tracks: 1

Other information
- Status: Staffed
- Website: Official website

History
- Opened: November 21, 1936

Passengers
- 2019: 0 daily

Services
| Preceding station | JR West | Following station |
|---|---|---|
| Bingo Ochiai towards Hiroshima | Geibi Line Local | Onuka towards Niimi |
Location
- Location within Hiroshima Prefecture Location within Japan

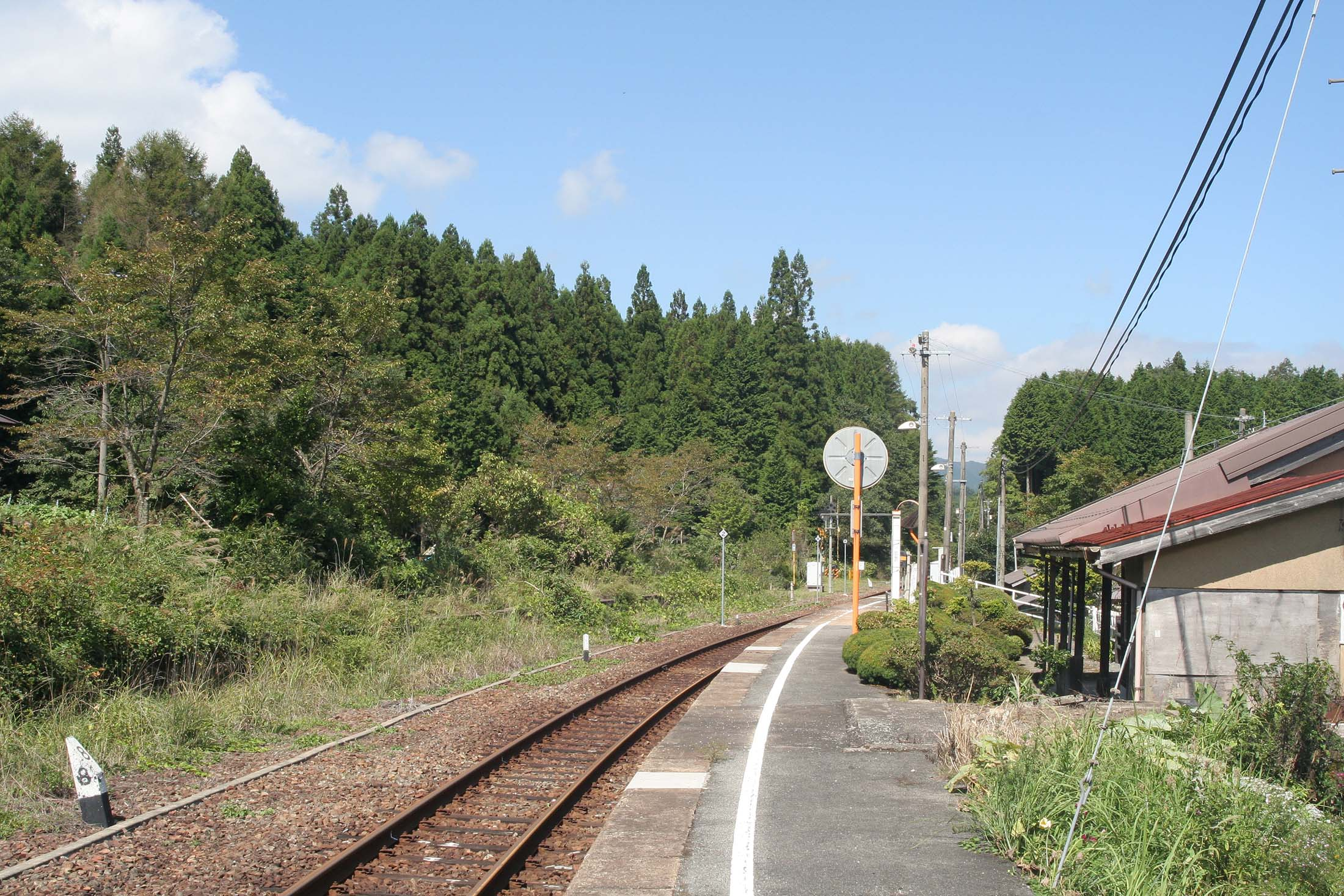
Platform (2007-09-26)

Dōgoyama Station (道後山駅, Dōgoyama-eki) is a passenger railway station located in Saijō-chō, in the city of Shōbara, Hiroshima Prefecture, Japan. It is operated by the West Japan Railway Company (JR West).

== Lines ==
Dōgoyama Station is served by the Geibi Line, and is located 37.8 kilometers from the terminus of the line at Bitchū-Kōjiro and 44.2 kilometers from Niimi.

== Station layout ==
The station consists of one ground-level side platform serving a single bi-directional track. Originally, it was a station with two opposite side platforms and two tracks. Although there is a station building, there are no facilities such as automatic ticket vending machines and station office has been refurbished as a fire engine shed. The station is unstaffed.

== History ==
Dōgoyama Station was opened on November 21, 1936. It became part of JR West on April 1, 1987 when Japan National Railways was privatized. Until 2011, Takaohara Ski Resort was adjacent to the west side of the station, and it used to be crowded with skiers. The ski resort was closed on March 20, 2015, and all station facilities were discontinued at that time.

== Passenger statistics ==
In fiscal 2019, the station was used by an average of 0 passengers daily.

== Surrounding area ==
- Japan National Route 314

== See also ==
- List of railway stations in Japan
