= Nakamita Station =

Railway station in Hiroshima, Japan

Coordinates: 34°30′47.3″N 132°36′32.3″E

Nakamita Station 中三田駅
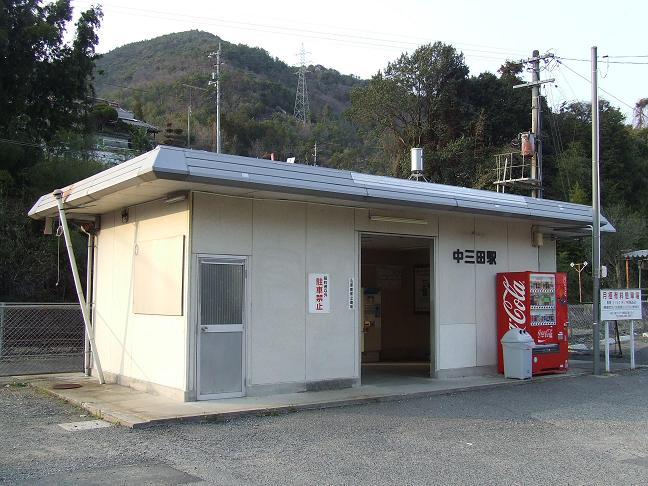
- Nakamita sta

General information
- Location: Asakita, Hiroshima, Hiroshima; Japan
- Operator: JR West
- Line: Geibi Line

History
- Opened: April 28, 1915
Location

Nakamita Station (中三田駅, Naka-Mita-eki) is a JR West Geibi Line station located in Mita, Shiraki-chō, Asakita-ku, Hiroshima, Hiroshima Prefecture, Japan.

== History ==
- 1915-04-28: Nakamita Station opens
- 1987-04-01: Japan National Railways is privatized, and Nakamita Station becomes a JR West station

== Station building and platforms ==
Nakamita Station features one island platform capable of handling two lines simultaneously. The station, while privately operated under contract from the railroad, is unstaffed. The Nakamita Station building is a simple concrete structure.

=== Environs ===
- Akimita Post Office
- Hiroshima Municipal Mita Elementary School
- Mita Nursery School
- Misasa River

=== Highway access ===
- Hiroshima Prefectural Route 37 (Hiroshima-Miyoshi Route)

== Connecting lines ==
All lines are JR West lines.

Geibi Line
Commuter Liner/Local

Kamimita Station — Nakamita Station — Shirakiyama Station
