= Kamimita Station =

Railway station in Hiroshima, Japan

Coordinates: 34°32′19.9″N 132°38′38.8″E

Kamimita Station 上三田駅
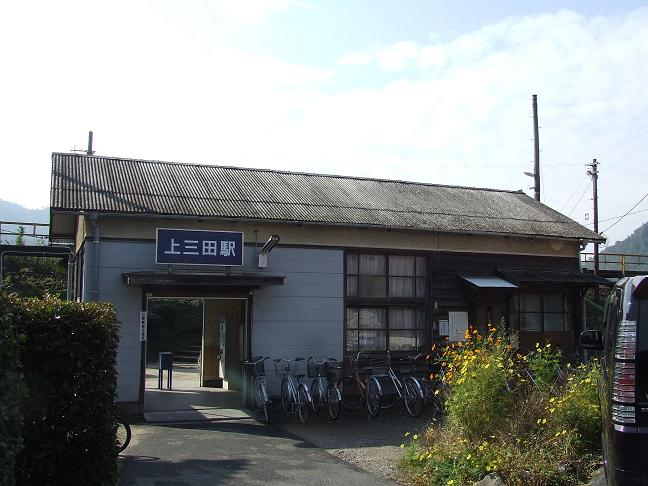
- Kamimita Station

General information
- Location: Asakita, Hiroshima, Hiroshima; Japan
- Operator: JR West
- Line: Geibi Line

History
- Opened: January 1, 1930
- Former names: Mita Yoshinaga (until 1937)
Location

Kamimita Station (上三田駅, Kami-Mita-eki) is a JR West Geibi Line station located in Koaza Yoshinaga, Ōaza Mita, Shiraki-chō, Asakita-ku, Hiroshima, Hiroshima Prefecture, Japan.

== History ==
Kamimita Station was originally designed as a place for cars to stop, but with the gasoline rationing during World War II, the station was closed. After the war, the local citizens began a drive to reopen the station, and finally did so using privately raised funds. Because of this, the station is known for its story of "resurrection" through the efforts of the local residents.

- 1930-01-01: Mita Yoshinaga Station opens
- 1937-07-01: Station name changes to Kamimita Station
- 1942: Station closes.
- 1948-08-10: Kamimita Station reopens.
- 1987-04-01: Japan National Railways is privatized, and Kamimita Station becomes a JR West station

== Station building and platforms ==
Kamimita Station features one raised platform capable of handling one line. The station building is a small wooden structure located down a short hill from the platform.

=== Environs ===
- Kamimita Branch Post Office
- Kawazu River
- Misasa River

=== Highway access ===
- Hiroshima Prefectural Route 37 (Hiroshima-Miyoshi Route)

== Connecting lines ==
All lines are JR West lines.

- Geibi Line
- Commuter Liner/Local

- Shiwaguchi Station — Kamimita Station — Nakamita Station
