= Kamikawatachi Station =

Railway station in Miyoshi, Hiroshima Prefecture, Japan

Kamikawatachi Station 上川立駅
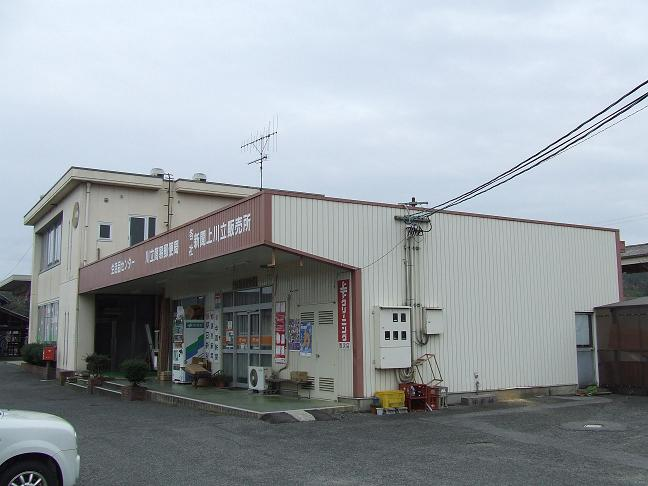
- Kamikawatachi Station, October 2011

General information
- Location: 67 Kamikawatachi-chō, Miyoshi-shi, Hiroshima-ken 729-6334; Japan
- Coordinates: 34°43′31.34″N 132°47′5.54″E
- Owner: West Japan Railway Company
- Operator: West Japan Railway Company
- Line: P Geibi Line
- Distance: 102.2 km (63.5 miles) from Bitchū-Kōjiro
- Platforms: 1 side platform
- Tracks: 1
- Connections: Bus stop

Construction
- Structure type: Ground level
- Accessible: Yes

Other information
- Status: Unstaffed
- Website: Official website

History
- Opened: 28 April 1915
- Former names: Kawatachi (until 1937)

Passengers
- FY2019: 19

Services
| Preceding station | JR West | Following station |
|---|---|---|
| Kōtachi towards Hiroshima | Geibi Line Local | Shiwachi towards Niimi |
Location
- Location within Hiroshima Prefecture Location within Japan

Kamikawatachi Station (上川立駅, Kami-Kawatachi-eki) is a passenger railway station located in the city of Miyoshi, Hiroshima Prefecture, Japan. It is operated by the West Japan Railway Company (JR West).

== Lines ==
Kami-Kawatachi Station is served by the JR West Geibi Line, and is located 102.2 kilometers from the terminus of the line at Bitchū-Kōjiro and 11.9 kilometers from Miyoshi.

== Station layout ==
The station consists of one side platform serving a single bi-directional track. The station was formerly a switching station, and some of the old facilities can still in situ. The station building includes the local post office, but the railway portion of the station is unattended.

== History ==
Kami-Kawatachi Station was opened on 28 April 1915 as Kawatachi Station (川立駅). With the nationalization of the Geibi Railway on 1 July 1937, the station was renamed to its present name. With the privatization of the Japanese National Railways (JNR) on 1 April 1987, the station came under the control of JR West. The station was closed from 6 July 2018 to 4 April 2019 after damage to the line from heavy rains.

== Passenger statistics ==
In fiscal 2019, the station was used by an average of 19 passengers daily.

== Surrounding area ==
- Miyoshi Municipal Kawaji Junior High School
- Miyoshi Municipal Kawaji Elementary School
- Japan National Route 54

== See also ==
- List of railway stations in Japan
