= Geibi Line =

Railway line in Okayama and Hiroshima prefectures

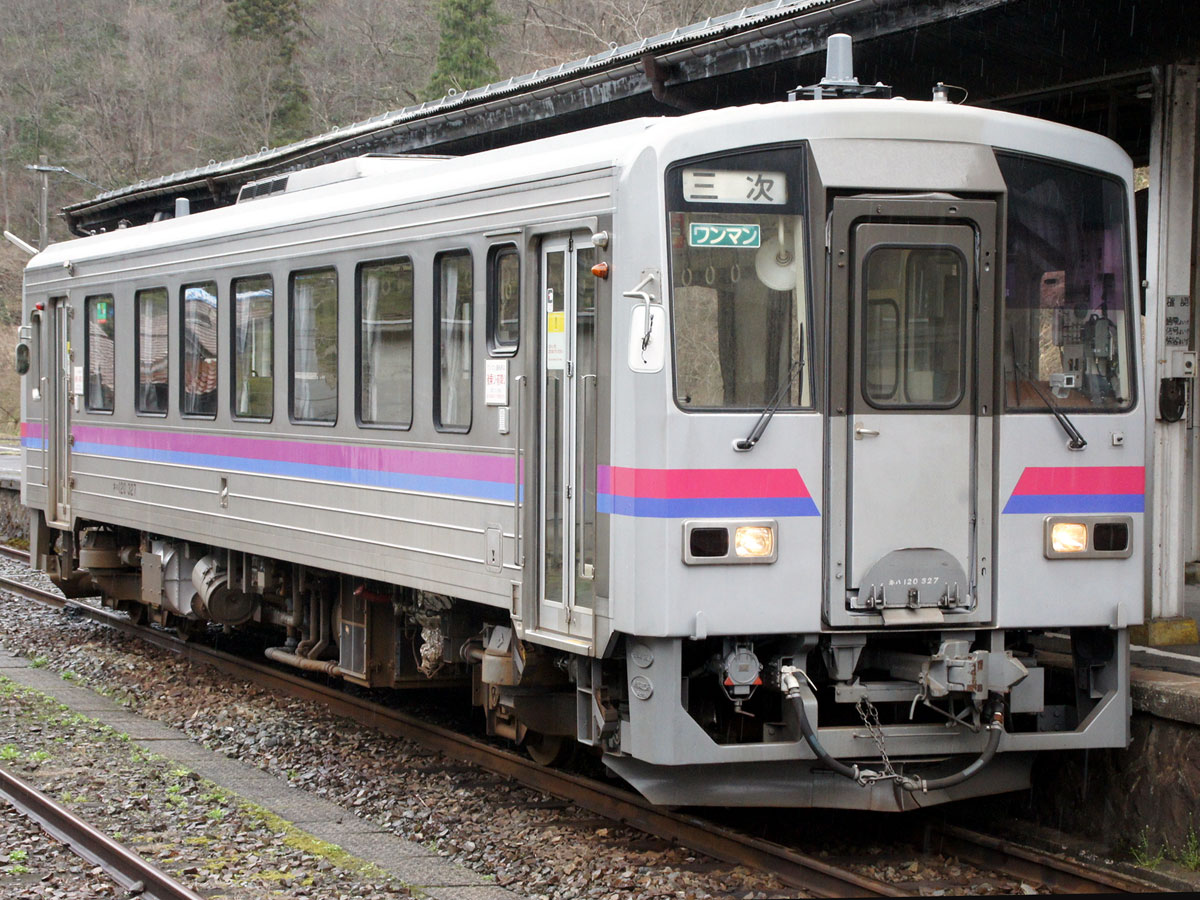
- A Geibi Line KiHa 120 DMU

Overview
- Native name: 芸備線
- Status: In operation
- Owner: JR West
- Locale: Hiroshima and Okayama Prefectures
- Termini: Bitchū-Kōjiro; Hiroshima
- Stations: 44

Service
- Type: Commuter rail line
- System: Hiroshima City Network (Karuga–Hiroshima)
- Operator: JR West
- Rolling stock: KiHa 120 series DMU, KiHa 40 series DMU

History
- Opened: 28 April 1915; 111 years ago

Technical
- Line length: 159.1 km (98.9 mi)
- Number of tracks: Entirely Single-tracked
- Character: Rural and urban
- Track gauge: 1,067 mm (3 ft 6 in)
- Electrification: None
- Operating speed: 85 km/h (53 mph)
- Signalling: Automatic closed block
- Train protection system: ATS-SW

The Geibi Line (芸備線, Geibi-sen) is a railway line operated by West Japan Railway Company (JR West) in the mountainous area of the Chūgoku region in Japan. It begins at Bitchū-Kōjiro Station on the west side of Niimi, Okayama Prefecture, connecting through Miyoshi Station in Miyoshi, Hiroshima Prefecture, and terminating at Hiroshima Station in Hiroshima. In addition to the Chūgoku Expressway, the Geibi Line is considered the main commuter and local rail line covering the route between northern Hiroshima Prefecture and the city of Hiroshima. The name of the line refers to the ancient provinces of Aki (安芸) (in Hiroshima Prefecture) and Bitchū (備中) (in Okayama Prefecture), which the line connects.

Since 2007, the ICOCA card can be used in all stations between Hiroshima Station and Karuga Station (stations in the Hiroshima City Network).

The majority of the line was out of service after a bridge was destroyed in the 2018 Japan floods. The entire line reopened in October 2019.

The line is one of the least used and least profitable in the JR West network, with average daily ridership of just 13 people (slightly more than two per train) on its least trafficked segment. The segment between Bitchu-Kojiro and Bingo-Yawata runs at an annual loss of JPY 700 million, while the segment between Tojo and Bingo-Shobara is both circuitous and speed-restricted, making it less attractive than bus service. However, local authorities along the route have refused to discuss alternative transportation options with JR West.

== Station list ==
Listed in order from Bitchū-Kōjiro Station to Hiroshima Station, though the chart shows through Niimi Station for convenience as all Geibi Line trains originate and terminate at Niimi.

- ● indicates a station at which a Rapid train stops, and ｜ indicates a station at which a Rapid train does not stop. In addition, Rapid trains are only operated from Niimi to Bingo-Ochiai in one direction, and thus the stations it skips are marked ↓. Stations marked with ▼ are where Rapid Shōbara Liner trains (operating from Hiroshima to Bingo-Ochiai) skip and Rapid trains from Bingo-Ochiai to Hiroshima stop. Local trains stop at all stations.
- The section of the Geibi Line between Karuga and Hiroshima forms part of the Hiroshima City Network.

No.	Station	Distance in km (mi)	Rapid	Miyoshi Liner	Transfers	Location	
Hakubi Line
	Niimi 新見		●		V Hakubi Line; K Kishin Line	Niimi	Okayama Prefecture
	Nunohara 布原		↓			Niimi	Okayama Prefecture
Geibi Line
	Bitchū-Kōjiro 備中神代	0.0 (0)	↓		V Hakubi Line	Niimi	Okayama Prefecture
	Sakane 坂根	3.9 (2.4)	↓			Niimi	Okayama Prefecture
	Ichioka 市岡	6.4 (4.0)	↓			Niimi	Okayama Prefecture
	Yagami 矢神	10.0 (6.2)	●			Niimi	Okayama Prefecture
	Nochi 野馳	13.6 (8.5)	↓			Niimi	Okayama Prefecture
	Tōjō 東城	18.8 (11.7)	●			Shōbara	Hiroshima Prefecture
	Bingo-Yawata 備後八幡	25.3 (15.7)	●			Shōbara	Hiroshima Prefecture
	Uchina 内名	29.0 (18.0)	●			Shōbara	Hiroshima Prefecture
	Onuka 小奴可	33.6 (20.9)	●			Shōbara	Hiroshima Prefecture
	Dōgoyama 道後山	37.8 (23.5)	●			Shōbara	Hiroshima Prefecture
	Bingo-Ochiai 備後落合	44.6 (27.7)	●		E Kisuki Line	Shōbara	Hiroshima Prefecture
	Hibayama 比婆山	50.2 (31.2)				Shōbara	Hiroshima Prefecture
	Bingo-Saijō 備後西城	53.2 (33.1)				Shōbara	Hiroshima Prefecture
	Hirako 平子	57.4 (35.7)				Shōbara	Hiroshima Prefecture
	Taka 高	62.3 (38.7)				Shōbara	Hiroshima Prefecture
	Bingo-Shōbara 備後庄原	68.5 (42.6)				Shōbara	Hiroshima Prefecture
	Bingo-Mikkaichi 備後三日市	70.5 (43.8)				Shōbara	Hiroshima Prefecture
	Nanatsuka 七塚	72.2 (44.9)				Shōbara	Hiroshima Prefecture
	Yamanouchi 山ノ内	75.2 (46.7)				Shōbara	Hiroshima Prefecture
	Shimowachi 下和知	80.1 (49.8)				Miyoshi	Hiroshima Prefecture
	Shiomachi 塩町	83.2 (51.7)			Z Fukuen Line	Miyoshi	Hiroshima Prefecture
	Kamisugi 神杉	84.7 (52.6)				Miyoshi	Hiroshima Prefecture
	Yatsugi 八次	88.0 (54.7)				Miyoshi	Hiroshima Prefecture
	Miyoshi 三次	90.3 (56.1)		●	Z Fukuen Line	Miyoshi	Hiroshima Prefecture
	Nishi Miyoshi 西三次	91.9 (57.1)		｜		Miyoshi	Hiroshima Prefecture
	Shiwachi 志和地	99.6 (61.9)		｜		Miyoshi	Hiroshima Prefecture
	Kamikawatachi 上川立	102.2 (63.5)		｜		Miyoshi	Hiroshima Prefecture
	Kōtachi 甲立	106.5 (66.2)		●		Akitakata	Hiroshima Prefecture
	Yoshidaguchi 吉田口	109.9 (68.3)		｜		Akitakata	Hiroshima Prefecture
	Mukaihara 向原	116.1 (72.1)		●		Akitakata	Hiroshima Prefecture
	Ibaraichi 井原市	122.0 (75.8)		｜		Asakita-ku, Hiroshima	Hiroshima Prefecture
	Shiwaguchi 志和口	126.0 (78.3)		●		Asakita-ku, Hiroshima	Hiroshima Prefecture
	Kamimita 上三田	129.5 (80.5)		｜		Asakita-ku, Hiroshima	Hiroshima Prefecture
	Nakamita 中三田	134.0 (83.3)		｜		Asakita-ku, Hiroshima	Hiroshima Prefecture
	Shirakiyama 白木山	136.3 (84.7)		｜		Asakita-ku, Hiroshima	Hiroshima Prefecture
P 09	Karuga 狩留家	138.5 (86.1)		｜		Asakita-ku, Hiroshima	Hiroshima Prefecture
P 08	Kamifukawa 上深川	140.7 (87.4)		｜		Asakita-ku, Hiroshima	Hiroshima Prefecture
P 07	Nakafukawa 中深川	143.5 (89.2)		｜		Asakita-ku, Hiroshima	Hiroshima Prefecture
P 06	Shimofukawa 下深川	144.9 (90.0)		●		Asakita-ku, Hiroshima	Hiroshima Prefecture
P 05	Kumura 玖村	146.8 (91.2)		●		Asakita-ku, Hiroshima	Hiroshima Prefecture
P 04	Akiyaguchi 安芸矢口	149.3 (92.8)		●		Asakita-ku, Hiroshima	Hiroshima Prefecture
P 03	Hesaka 戸坂	152.1 (94.5)		●		Higashi-ku, Hiroshima	Hiroshima Prefecture
P 02	Yaga 矢賀	156.9 (97.5)		●		Higashi-ku, Hiroshima	Hiroshima Prefecture
P 01	Hiroshima 広島	159.1 (98.9)		●	San'yō Shinkansen; G San'yō Main Line (G 01); R San'yō Main Line (R 01); B Kabe Line (B 01); 1 2 5 6 Hiroden Main Line (M01)	Minami-ku, Hiroshima	Hiroshima Prefecture

=== Former connecting lines ===
- Sankō Line (closed 1 April 2018) – Miyoshi Station

== Rolling stock ==
The following diesel multiple unit (DMU) rolling stock currently operate on the Geibi Line:

KiHa 120	KiHa 47	KiHa 47
Type 120 DMU	Hiroshima livery	Metropolitan area livery

== History ==
The Geibi Line consists of the section opened by the Geibi Railway, which connected Hiroshima Station and Bingo-Shōbara, the Shōbara Line between Bingo-Shōbara and Bingo-Ochiai which was partly built by the Geibi Railway and then nationalised and extended by the Japanese Government Railways (JGR) and the Sanshin Line built by the JGR between Onuka and Bitchū-Kōjiro. In 1936, the line between Hiroshima and Bitchū-Kōjiro was completed, and the Geibi Railway was nationalised the following year, bringing the entire line under the control of the JGR. Opening dates for individual sections are given below.

=== Geibi Railway ===
- 18 April 1915: The Geibi Railway opened between Higashi Hiroshima (different from the current Higashi-Hiroshima Station) and Shiwachi.
- 1 June 1915: The line is extended from Shiwachi to Miyoshi (the current Nishi Miyoshi Station).
- 15 April 1916: Hesaka Station opens.
- 15 July 1920: The line between Hiroshima and Higashi Hiroshima opens. JNR Hiroshima Station opens.
- 7 June 1922: The line between Miyoshi (the current Nishi Miyoshi Station) and Shiomachi (the current Kamisugi Station) opens.
- 8 December 1923: The line between Shiomachi (the current Kamisugi Station) and Bingo-Shōbara opens.
- 20 September 1924: Nakafukawa Station and Yamanouchi Station open.
- 1 February 1925: Wadamura Station becomes Shimowachi Station.
- 20 March 1929: Yaga Station and Kamifukawa Station open.
- 1 January 1930: Shirakiyamaguchi Station, Mita Yoshinaga Station, and Tōkaichi Station open.
- 22 April 1930: Takō Station (the current Shiomachi Station) opens.
- 25 April 1930: Mikkaichi Station opens.

=== Shōbara Line ===
- 1 June 1933: Tōkaichi Station is renamed Bingo-Tōkaichi Station and Mikkaichi Station is renamed Bingo-Mikkaichi Station. The Geibi Railway line between Bingo-Tōkaichi Station (the current Miyoshi Station) and Bingo-Shōbara Station is nationalized and renamed the Shōbara Line.
- 1 January 1934: Shiomachi Station is renamed Kamisugi Station, and Takō Station is renamed Shiomachi Station.
- 15 March 1934: The line between Bingo-Shōbara Station and Bingo-Saijō Station opens.
- 20 December 1935: The line between Bingo-Saijō Station and Bingo-Ochiai Station opened.

=== Sanshin Line ===
- 10 February 1930: The Sanshin Line opens between Bitchū-Kōjiro Station and Yagami Station.
- 25 November 1930: The line opens between Yagami Station and Tōjō Station.
- 15 June 1935: The line between Tōjō Station and Onuka Station opens.
- 10 October 1936: The line between Onuka Station and Bingo-Ochia Station opens. The Shōbara Line is absorbed into the Sanshin Line, which now includes everything between Bitchū-Kōjiro Station and Bingo-Tōkaichi Station.
- 21 November 1936: Dōgoyama Station opens.

=== Geibi Line ===
- 1 July 1937: The Geibi Railway line between Hiroshima Station and Bingo-Tōkaichi Station is nationalized, and the Sanshin Line is absorbed into the Geibi Line. Kawatachi Station is renamed Kamikawatachi Station, Mita Yoshinaga Station is renamed Kamimita Station, Shirakiyamaguchi Station is renamed Shirakiyama Station, and Yaguchi Station is renamed Akiyaguchi Station.
- 10 August 1941: Kamifukawa Station and Yaga Station close.
- 28 October 1942: Yaga Station closes, and a signal box is installed.
- 2 April 1943: Yaga Station reopens.
- 10 August 1948: Kamifukawa Station reopens.
- 1 February 1952: Hirako Station opens.
- 1 October 1953: Ichioka Station opens.
- 10 November 1954: The former Miyoshi Station is renamed Nishi Miyoshi Station.
- 10 December 1954: Bingo-Tōkaichi Station is renamed Miyoshi Station.
- 20 July 1955: Uchina Station opens.
- 11 November 1955: The Chidori service begins.
- 20 December 1956: Bingo-Kumano Station is renamed Hibayama Station.
- 13 April 1959: The Chidori is upgraded to a local express train.
- 15 March 1962: The Taishaku service begins.
- 5 March 1968: The Taishaku and Chidori services are upgraded to regular express trains.
- 1 March 1983: The line between Miyoshi Station and Hiroshima Station uses CTC.
- 31 October 1983: The line between Bitchū-Kōjiro and Miyoshi uses CTC.
- 15 March 1985: The Miyoshi express service begins.
- 1 November 1986: Freight service is discontinued on the Geibi Line.
- 1 April 1987: The Geibi Line becomes part of West Japan Railway Company following privatization of Japanese National Railways.
- 1 April 1991: Wanman driver-only operation commences on the line between Niimi and Miyoshi.
- 1 November 1991: The line between Miyoshi and Hiroshima is converted to wanman driver-only operation.
- 22 March 2002: The Chidori and Taishaku express services are absorbed into the Miyoshi express service.
- 1 October 2003: The Miyoshi Liner and Tsūkin Liner services begin.
- 23 April 2006: The Geibi Line is moved between Kamikawatachi and Kōtachi following widening of Hiroshima Prefectural Route 37 between Hiroshima and Miyoshi.
- 19 July 2006: Services between Bingo-Ochiai and Bingo-Saijō are suspended due to storm damage of the Geibi Line. An interim bus service begins the following day.
- 1 April 2007: Train service is resumed between Bingo-Ochiai and Bingo-Saijō.
- 1 July 2007: Miyoshi express services are discontinued, and Tsūkin Liner rapid services are integrated into Miyoshi Liner rapid services.
- 7 July 2018: The 2018 Japan floods result in damage to the line in several places, most significantly destroying the bridge over the Misasagawa River between Shirakiyama and Karuga stations, resulting in the closure of the entire line.
- 23 July 2018: The Hiroshima – Shimofukawa section of the line is reopened. JR West advises replacement of the Misasagawa Bridge is expected to take up to a year.
- 25 August 2018: The Karuga – Shimofukawa section of the line is reopened.
- 27 August 2018: The Bitchū-Kōjiro – Tōjō section of the line is reopened.
- 31 August 2018: The Tōjō – Bingo-Ochiai section of the line is reopened.
- 4 October 2018: The Bingo-Shōbara – Miyoshi section of the line is reopened.
- 20 December 2018: The Bingo-Ochiai – Bingo-Shōbara section of the line is reopened.
- 4 April 2019: The Miyoshi – Nakamita section of the line is reopened. However, trains only operate in the morning and evening hours (Operations were suspended from 25 July to 31 August).
- 23 October 2019: The Nakamita – Karuga section of the line is reopened. The entire line reopened after 1 year and 3 months from the 2018 Japan floods.
- 9 March 2020: A KiHa 120 car derails near Bingo-Yawata station, causing a temporary closure of the line between Tōjō and Bingo-Ochiai.
- 8 June 2021: JR West initiated a work group with local communities along the Bingo-Shōbara – Niimi section to assess the future of the line. According to JR West data, on average only 81 passengers use the line between Bitchū-Kōjiro and Tōjō, 11 between Tōjō and Bingo-Ochiai and 215 between Bingo-Ochiai and Miyoshi. Due to the lack of patronage, JR West is considering to abolish the aforementioned section and replace it with bus services.

== See also ==
- List of railway lines in Japan
