= Shirakiyama Station =

Railway station in Hiroshima, Japan

Coordinates: 34°30′2.5″N 132°35′16.0″E

Shirakiyama Station 白木山駅
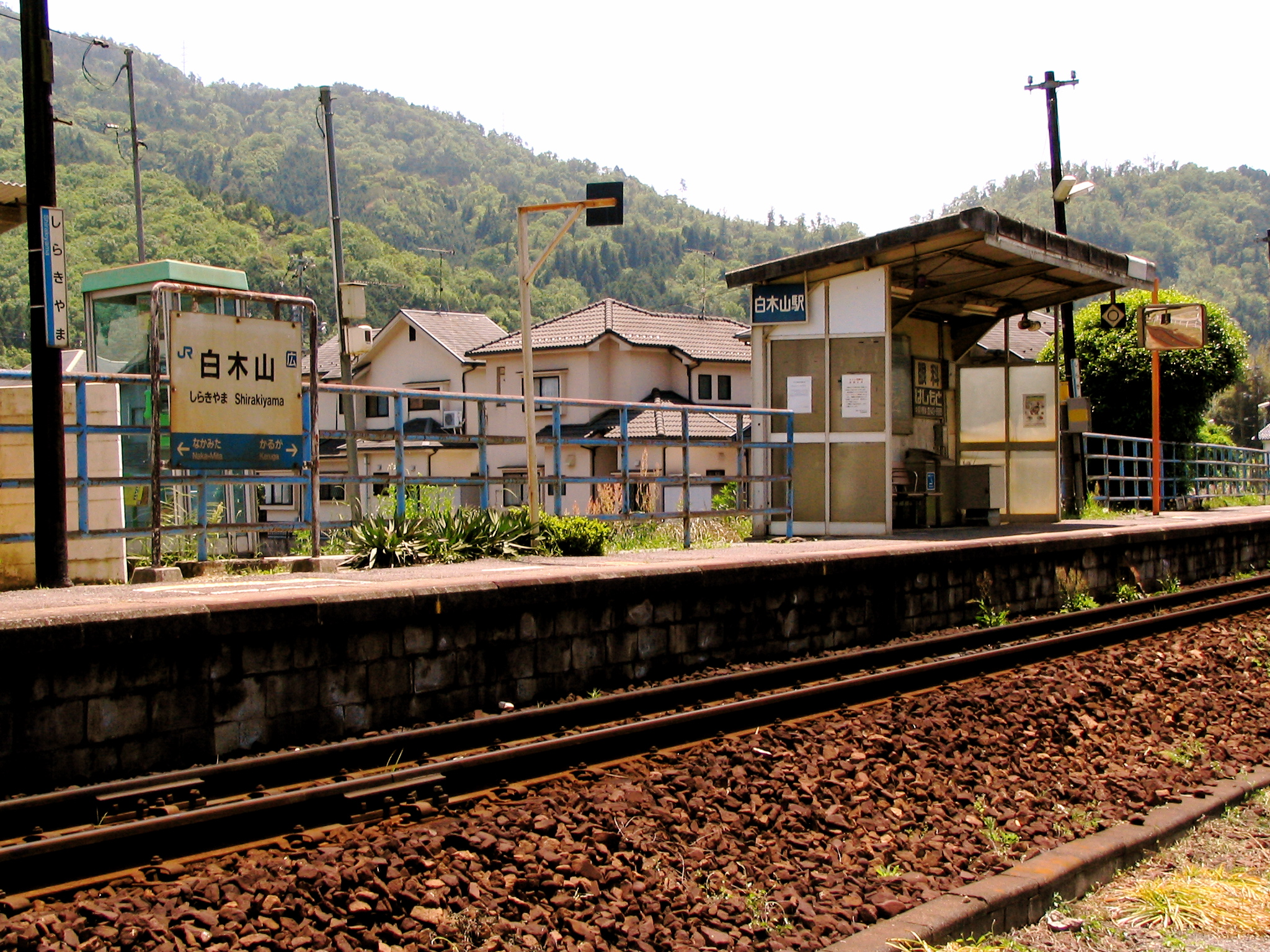
- Shirakiyama Station

General information
- Location: Asakita, Hiroshima, Hiroshima; Japan
- Operator: JR West
- Line: Geibi Line

History
- Opened: 1 January 1930
- Former names: Shirakiyamaguchi (until 1937)

Services
Preceding station	JR West	Following station
Karuga towards Hiroshima	Geibi Line Local	Nakamita towards Niimi
Location

Shirakiyama Station (白木山駅, Shirakiyama-eki) is a JR West Geibi Line station located in Mita, Shiraki-chō, Asakita-ku, Hiroshima, Hiroshima Prefecture, Japan.

== History ==
- 1930-01-01: Shirakiyamaguchi Station opens
- 1937-07-01: The station is renamed Shirakiyama Station
- 1987-04-01: Japan National Railways is privatized, and Shirakiyama Station becomes a JR West station

== Station building and platforms ==
Shirakiyama Station features one side platform capable of handling one line. The station is unstaffed, and is used as a convenient meeting place for the surrounding area.

=== Environs ===
- Junkaku-ji (Buddhist temple)
- Saifuki-ji (Buddhist temple)
- Bettōyama
- Shirakiyama trailhead
- Misasa River

=== Highway access ===
- Hiroshima Prefectural Route 37 (Hiroshima-Miyoshi Route)
