= Shiwaguchi Station =

Railway station in Hiroshima, Japan

Coordinates: 34°33′16.7″N 132°39′28.8″E

Shiwaguchi Station 志和口駅
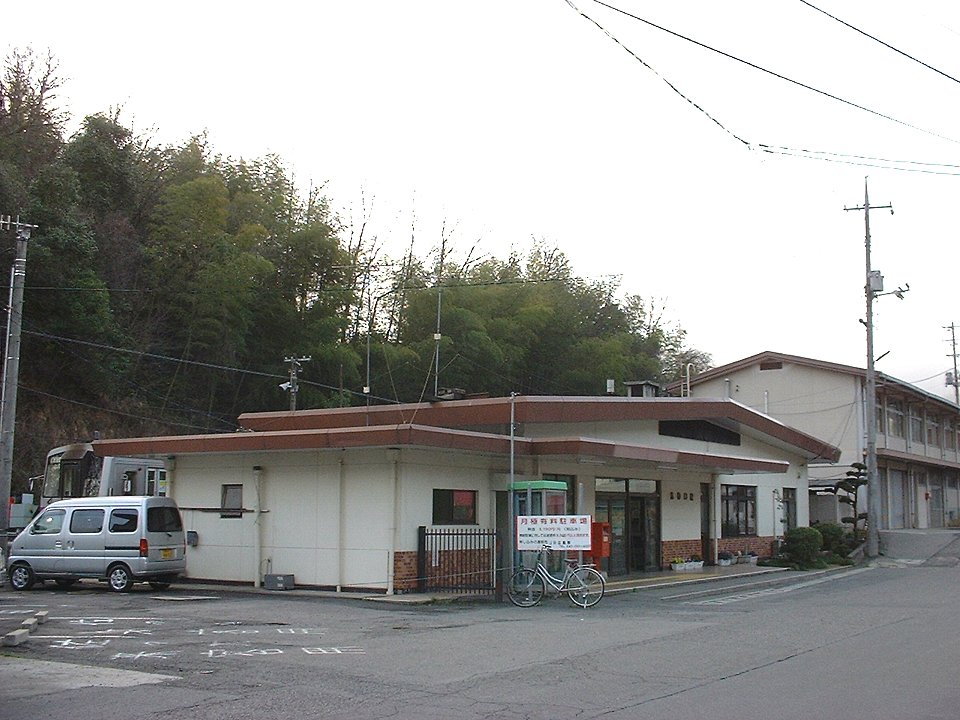
- Shiwaguchi Station building

General information
- Location: Asakita, Hiroshima, Hiroshima; Japan
- Operator: JR West
- Line: Geibi Line

History
- Opened: April 28, 1915
Location

Shiwaguchi Station (志和口駅, Shiwaguchi-eki) is a JR West Geibi Line station located in Ibara, Shiraki-chō, Asakita-ku, Hiroshima, Hiroshima Prefecture, Japan. The "Shiwa" in the name derives from the nearby Shiwa-chō, Higashihiroshima, despite there being no shuttle bus or other connection between the two locations. This station should not be confused with other stations of similar-sounding name on the Geibi Line: Shimowachi, Shiomachi, and Shiwachi. Even though Shiwaguchi Station is an express stop station, the Miyoshi Liner does not stop here due to lack of passengers using the station.

== History ==
- 1915-04-28: Shiwaguchi Station opens
- 1937-7-1: Geibi Railway gets nationalised.
- 1945-8-6: A school first aid station is set up near the station to rescue people who were injured in the atomic bombing of Hiroshima and were transported on the Geibi Line.
- 1980-3-15: Station building gets renovated.
- 1987-04-01: Japan National Railways is privatized, and Shiwaguchi Station comes under control by JR West.
- 1988-2: Midori no Madoguchi ticket office starts operation.
- 2004-10: The opening hours of the Midori no Madoguchi will be shortened and closing times will be set during opening hours.
- 2007: Due to a timetable revision, the express "Miyoshi" and rapid "Commuter Liner" (both of which stop at this station) were abolished and integrated into the rapid "Miyoshi Liner". As a result, the rapid "Miyoshi Liner" now stops at this station. Opening hours for the Midori no Madoguchi are separate for Monday through Friday (including public holidays) and Saturday and Sunday
- 2018-7-6: Closed due to the 2018 Japan floods.
- 2021-5-31 Midori no Madoguchi ends service.
- 2021-6-1 Station becomes completely unstaffed.

== Station building and platforms ==
Shiwaguchi Station features one raised island platform, capable of handling two lines simultaneously. The station building is a prominent one-story concrete building which includes a Ticket Machine the train station was staffed until 2018 they also had a Station Cat until 2018.

=== Environs ===
Two convenience stores are located directly across from the station. The Shiwaguchi Station Bus Stop is located near the station.

- Takaminami Post Office
- Shimizu Clinic
- Hiroshima Municipal Offices, Shiraki Branch
- Hiroshima Municipal Shiraki Junior High School
- Hiroshima Municipal Takaminami Elementary School
- Hiroshima Municipal Shiraki High School
- Misasa River
- Hiyama

=== Highway access ===
- Hiroshima Prefectural Route 37 (Hiroshima-Miyoshi Route)

== Connecting lines ==
All lines are JR West lines.

=== Geibi Line ===
- Miyoshi Express

- Mukaihara Station — Shiwaguchi Station — Shimofukawa Station

- Commuter Liner/Local

- Ibaraichi Station — Shiwaguchi Station — Kamimita Station
