= Hibayama Station =

Railway station in Shōbara, Hiroshima Prefecture, Japan

Hibayama Station 比婆山駅
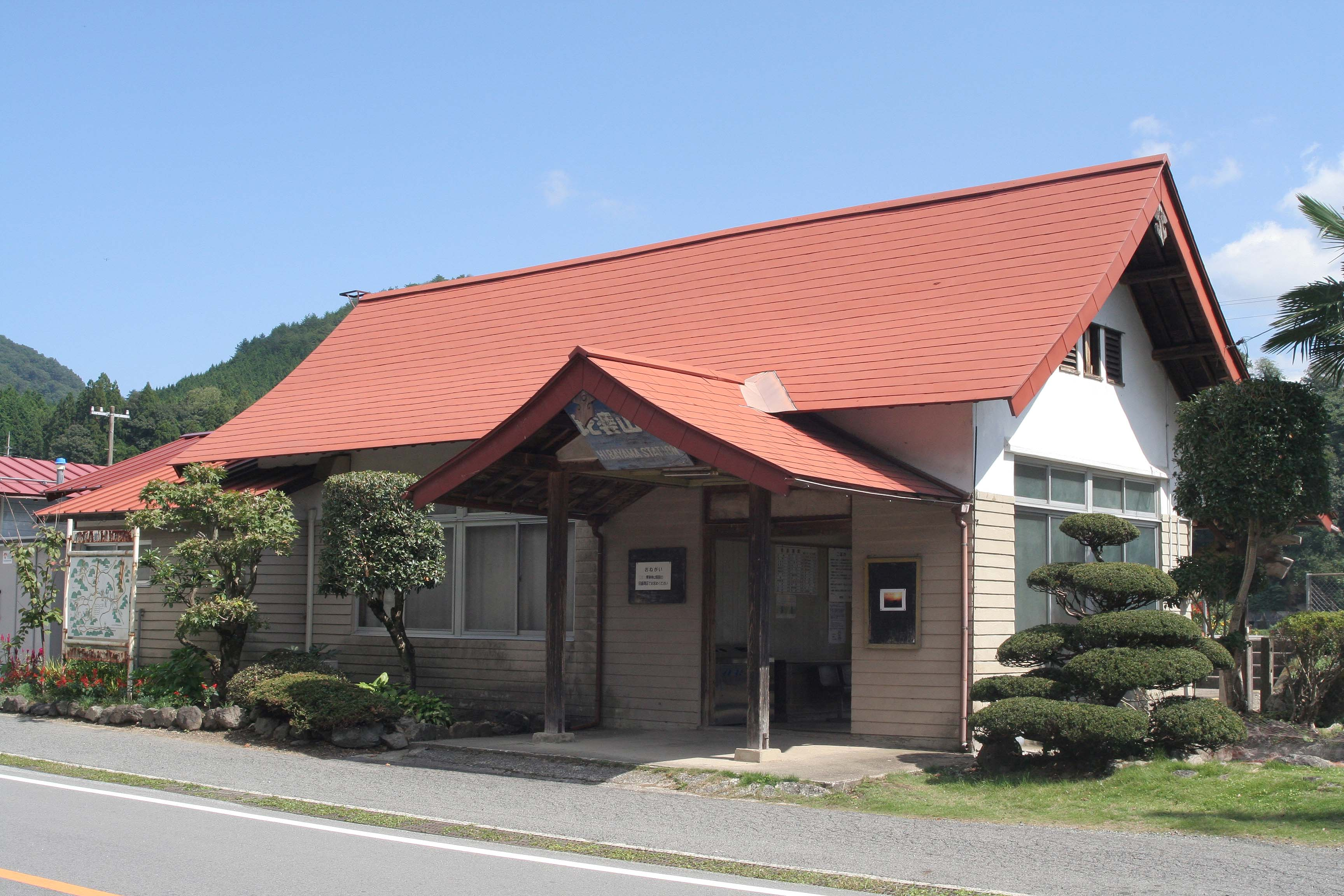
- Hibayama Station (September 2007)

General information
- Location: Ōya, Saijō-chō, Shōbara-shi, Hiroshima-ken 729-5744; Japan
- Coordinates: 34°57′58.67″N 133°7′23.65″E
- Operator: JR West
- Line: P Geibi Line
- Distance: 50.2 km (31.2 miles) from Bitchū-Kōjiro
- Platforms: 1 side platform
- Tracks: 1

Other information
- Status: Staffed
- Website: Official website

History
- Opened: December 21, 1935
- Former names: Bingo-Kumano (to 1956)

Passengers
- 2019: 2 daily

Services
Preceding station	JR West	Following station
Bingo-Saijō towards Hiroshima	Geibi Line Local	Bingo-Ochiai towards Niimi
Location
- Location within Hiroshima Prefecture Location within Japan

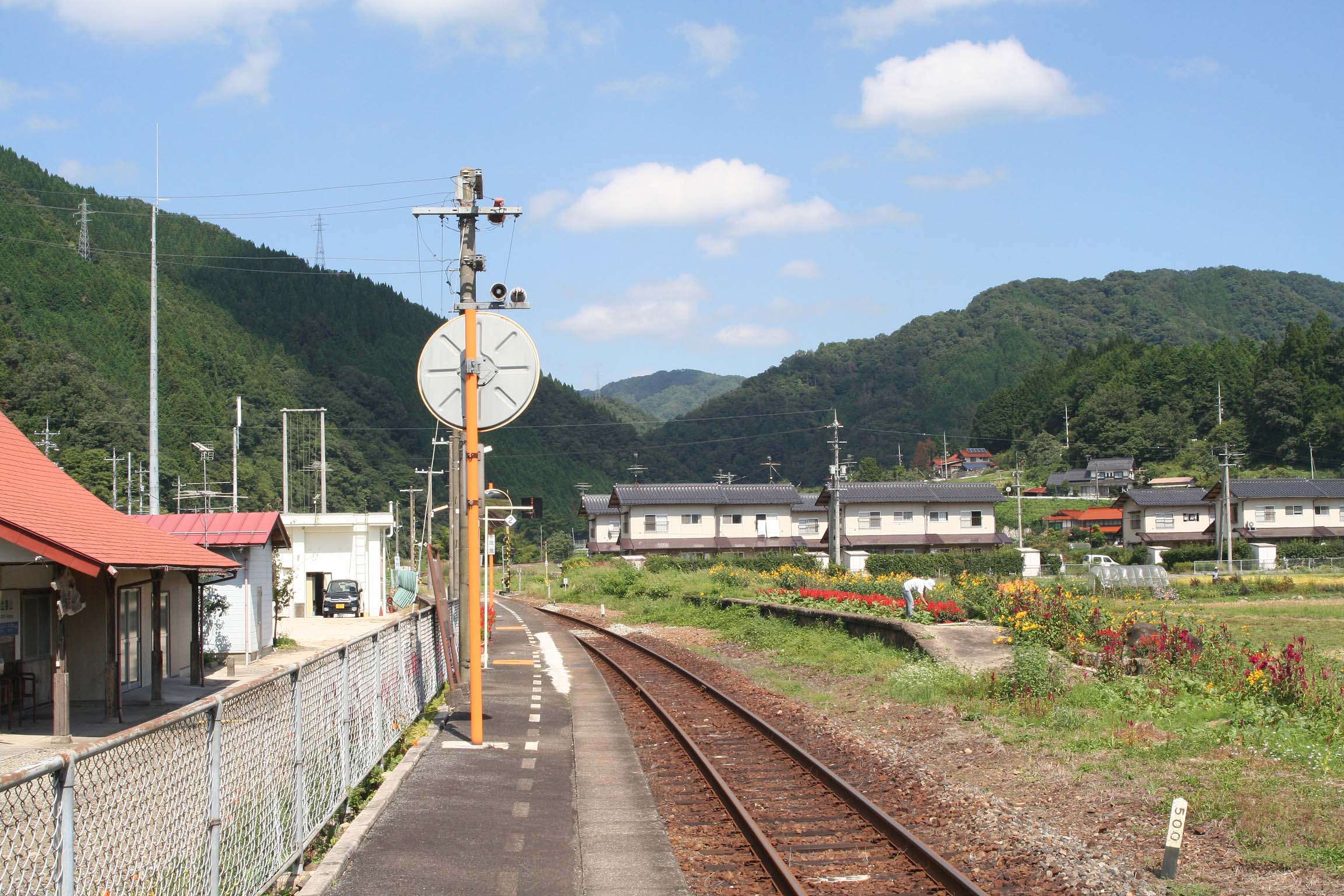
Station platform (2007-09-26).

Hibayama Station (比婆山駅, Hibayama-eki) is a passenger railway station located in Ōya, Saijō-chō, in the city of Shōbara, Hiroshima Prefecture, Japan. It is operated by the West Japan Railway Company (JR West).

== Lines ==
Hibayama Station is served by the Geibi Line, and is located 50.2 kilometers from the terminus of the line at Bitchū-Kōjiro and 56.6 kilometers from Niimi.

== Station layout ==
The station consists of one ground-level side platform serving a single bi-directional track. The station is unattended.

== History ==
Hibayama Station was opened on December 20, 1935, as Bingo-Kumano Station (備後熊野駅). It was renamed on December 20, 1956. It became part of JR West on April 1, 1987, when Japan National Railways was privatized.

== Passenger statistics ==
In fiscal 2019, the station was used by an average of 2 passengers daily.

== Surrounding area ==
The Saijō River is located about 100 meters behind the station.

- Japan National Route 183
- Shobara City Mikoto Elementary School

== See also ==
- List of railway stations in Japan
