= Uchina Station =

Railway station in Shōbara, Hiroshima Prefecture, Japan

Uchina Station 内名駅
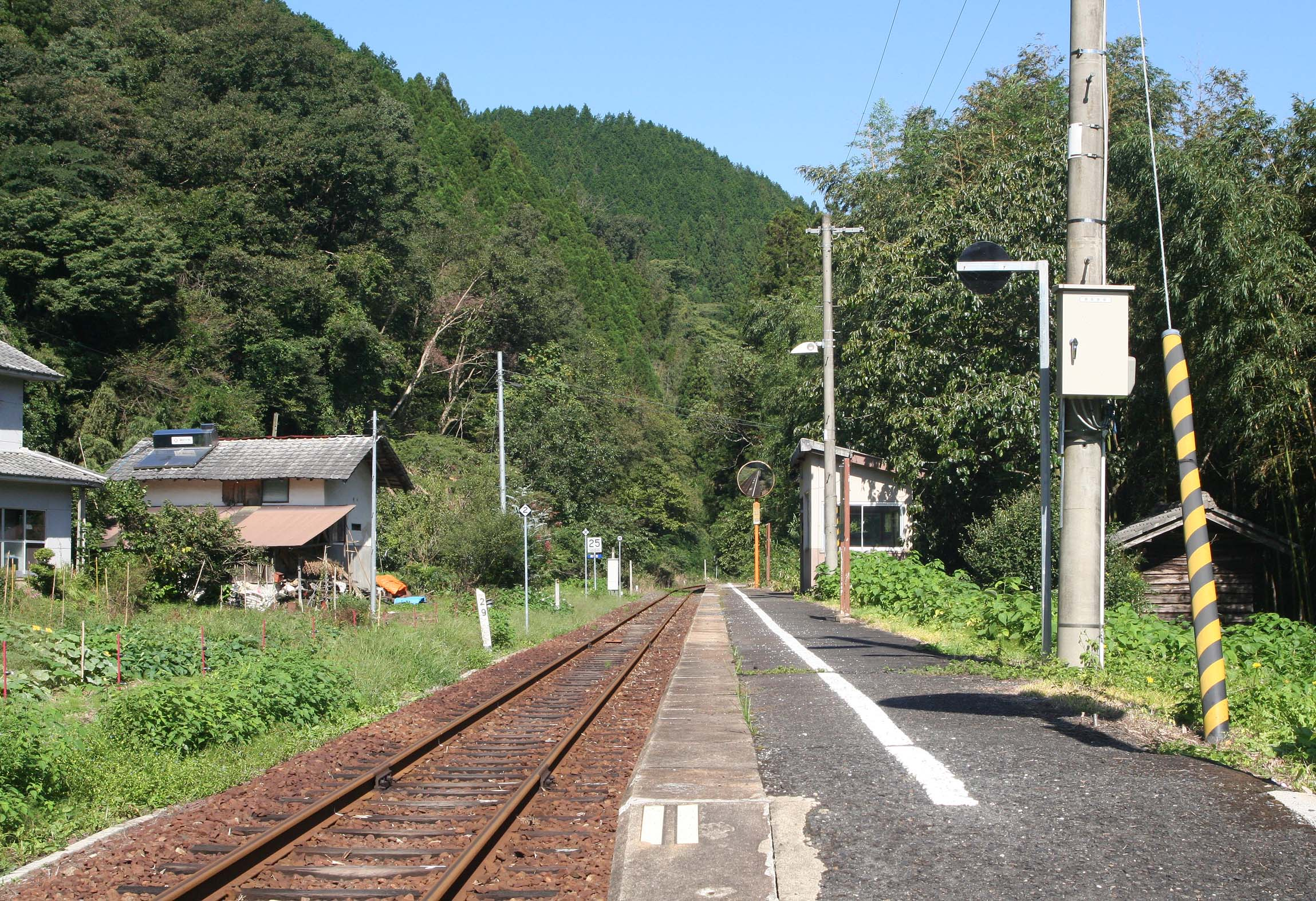
- Uchina Station (September 2007)

General information
- Location: Takemori, Tōjō-chō, Shōbara-shi, Hiroshima-ken 729-5126; Japan
- Coordinates: 34°57′53.74″N 133°13′55.07″E
- Operator: JR West
- Line: P Geibi Line
- Distance: 29.0 km (18.0 miles) from Bitchū-Kōjiro
- Platforms: 1 side platform
- Tracks: 1

Other information
- Status: Staffed
- Website: Official website

History
- Opened: July 20, 1955

Passengers
- 2019: 3 daily

Services
Preceding station	JR West	Following station
Onuka towards Hiroshima	Geibi Line Local	Bingo-Yawata towards Niimi
Location
- Location within Hiroshima Prefecture Location within Japan

Uchina Station (内名駅, Uchina-eki) is a passenger railway station located in Takemori, Tōjō-chō, in the city of Shōbara, Hiroshima Prefecture, Japan. It is operated by the West Japan Railway Company (JR West).

== Lines ==
Uchina Station is served by the Geibi Line, and is located 29.0 kilometers from the terminus of the line at Bitchū-Kōjiro and 35.4 kilometers from Niimi.

== Station layout ==
The station consists of one ground-level side platform serving a single bi-directional track. There is no station building or ticket machines, but there is a waiting room on the platform. The station is unattended.

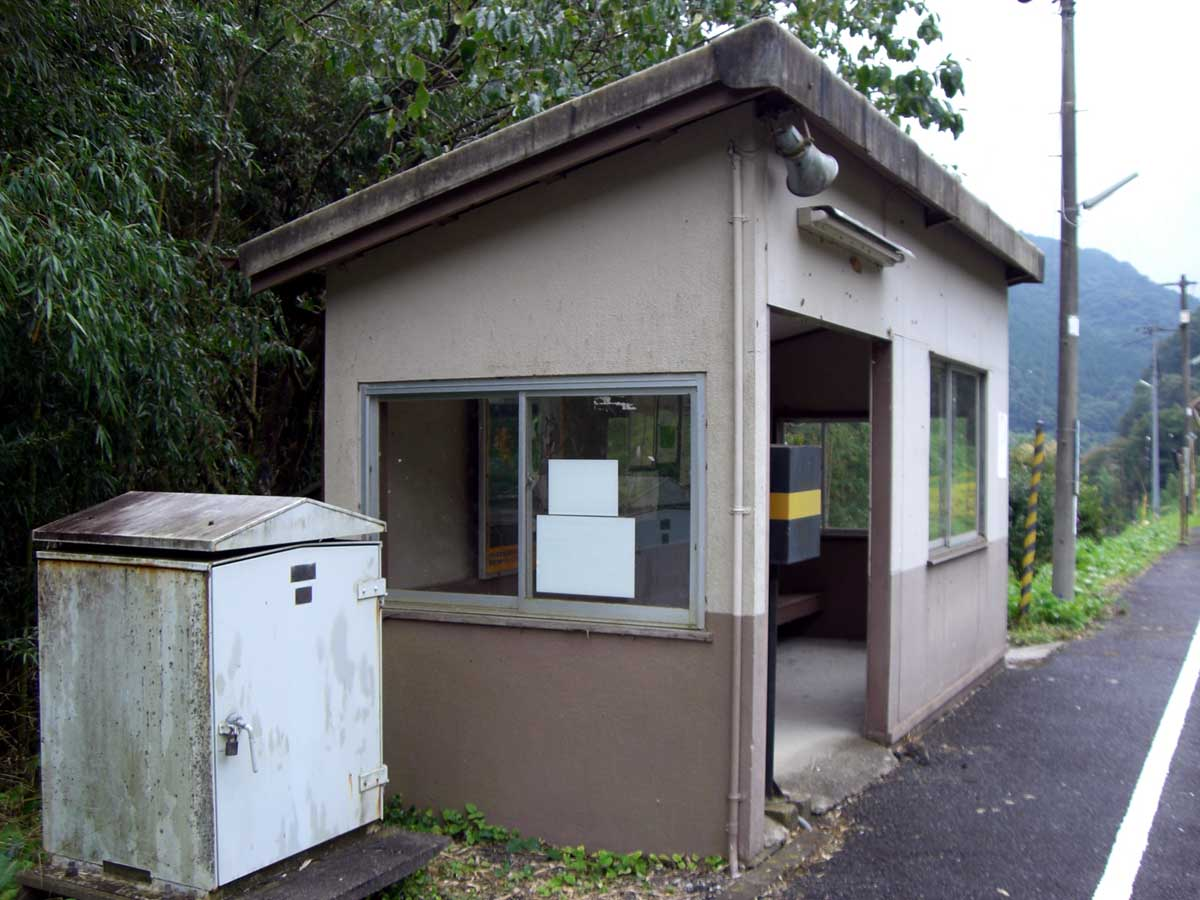
Uchina Station passenger waiting area building

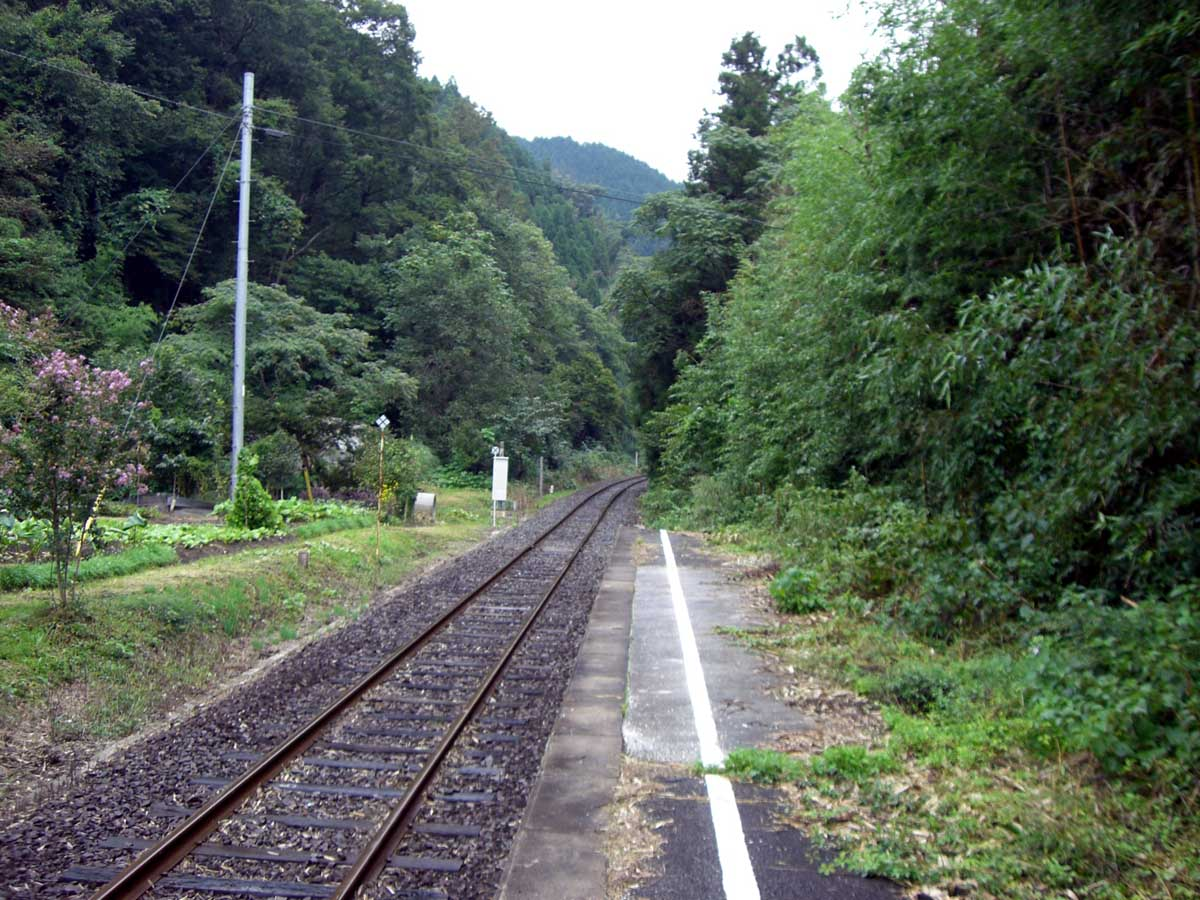
Uchina Station looking toward Bingo Ochiai Station

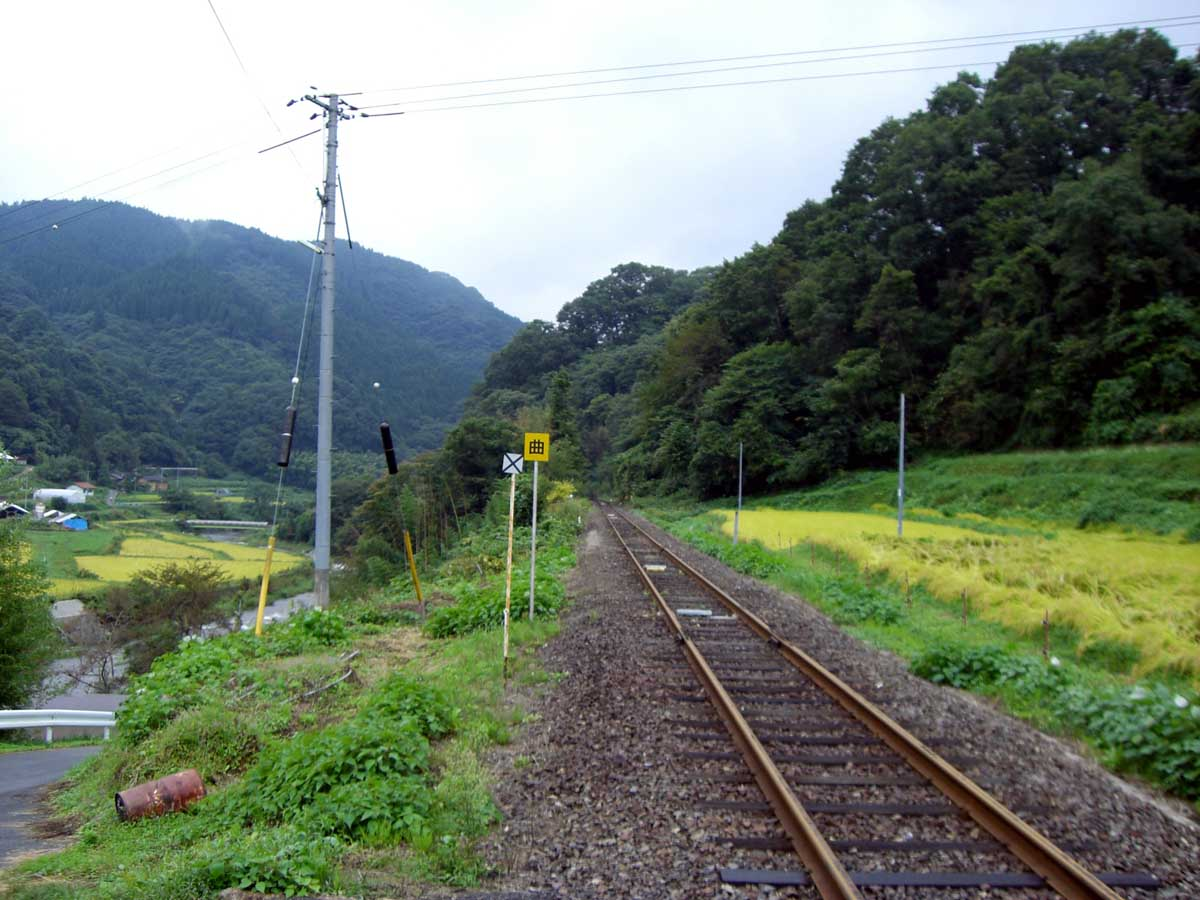
Uchina Station looking toward Tōjō Station

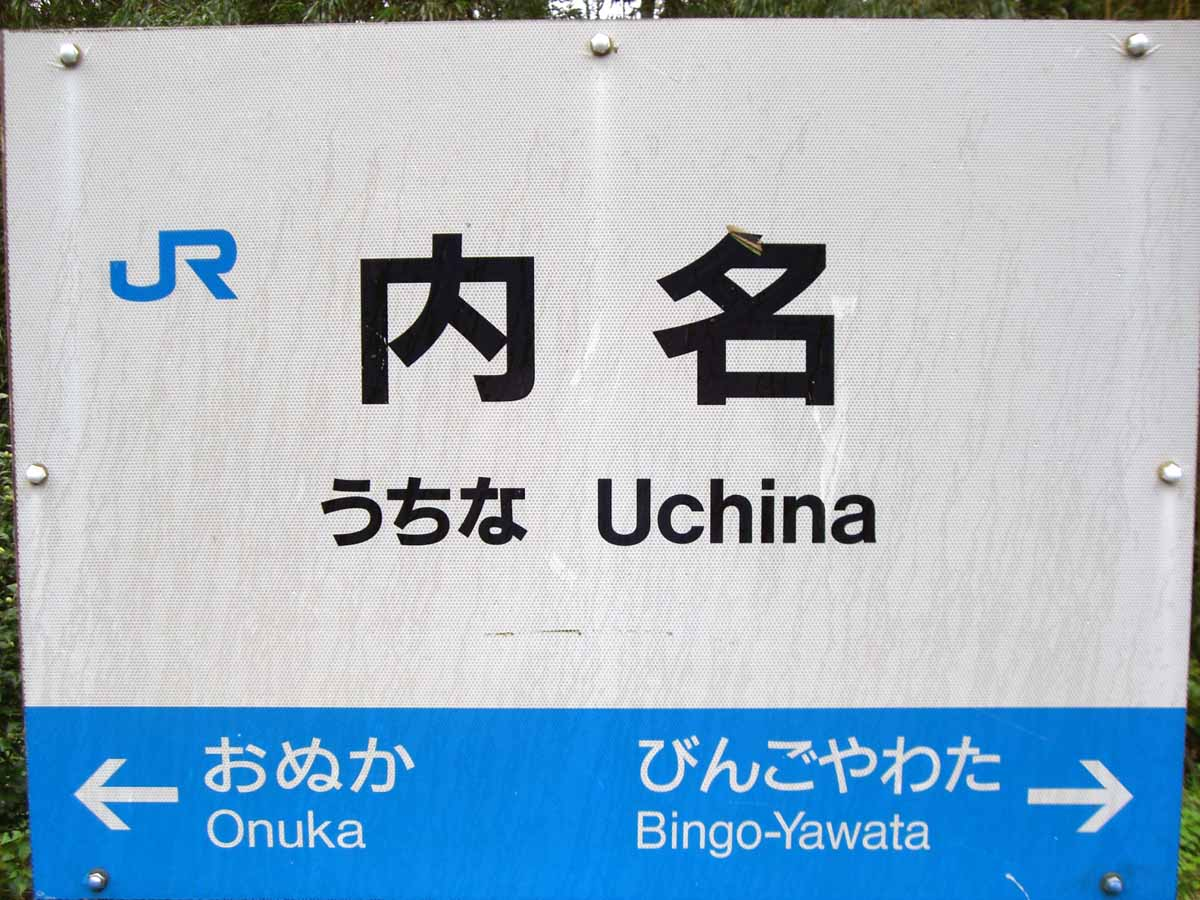
Uchina Station platform sign

== History ==
Uchina Station was opened on July 20, 1955. It became part of JR West on April 1, 1987 when Japan National Railways was privatized.

== Passenger statistics ==
In fiscal 2019, the station was used by an average of 3 passengers daily.

== Surrounding area ==
- Nariwa River
- Hiroshima Prefectural Road No. 450 Uchibori Bingo Hachiman Station Line

== See also ==
- List of railway stations in Japan
