= Ibaraichi Station =

Railway station in Hiroshima, Japan

Coordinates: 34°35′7″N 132°40′32″E

Ibaraichi Station 井原市駅
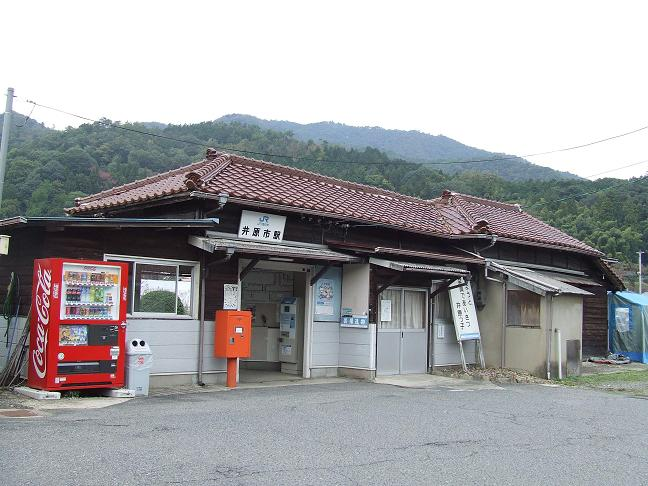
- Ibaraichi Station

General information
- Location: Akitakata, Hiroshima; Japan
- Operator: JR West
- Line: Geibi Line

History
- Opened: April 28, 1915

Services
Preceding station	JR West	Following station
Shiwaguchi towards Hiroshima	Geibi Line Local	Mukaihara towards Niimi
Location

Ibaraichi Station (井原市駅, Ibaraichi-eki) is a JR West Geibi Line station located in Ibara, Shiraki-chō, Asakita-ku, Hiroshima, Hiroshima Prefecture, Japan. This is the final of fifteen Geibi Line station within the boundaries of the city of Hiroshima.

== History ==
- 1915-04-28: Ibaraichi Station opens
- 1987-04-01: Japan National Railways is privatized, and Ibaraichi Station becomes a JR West station

== Station building and platforms ==
Ibaraichi Station features one raised side platform, capable of handling one line. Due to previously handling large amounts of freight traffics, the train yard is very large. The station building is an unusual shape due to countless renovations and additions since being opened. It is an older-style wooden building with a tile roof. Ibaraichi Station is currently an unstaffed station.

=== Environs ===
- Ibara Post Office
- Hiroshima Prefectural Ibara Elementary School
- JA Rice Center
- Misasa River
- Arataniyama

=== Highway access ===
- Hiroshima Prefectural Route 37 (Hiroshima-Miyoshi Route)
- Hiroshima Prefectural Route 68 (Ōbayashi-Ibara Route)
- Hiroshima Prefectural Route 226 (Ibaraichi Teishajō Route)
