= Yamanouchi Station (Hiroshima) =

Railway station in Shōbara, Hiroshima Prefecture, Japan

Yamanouchi Station 山ノ内駅
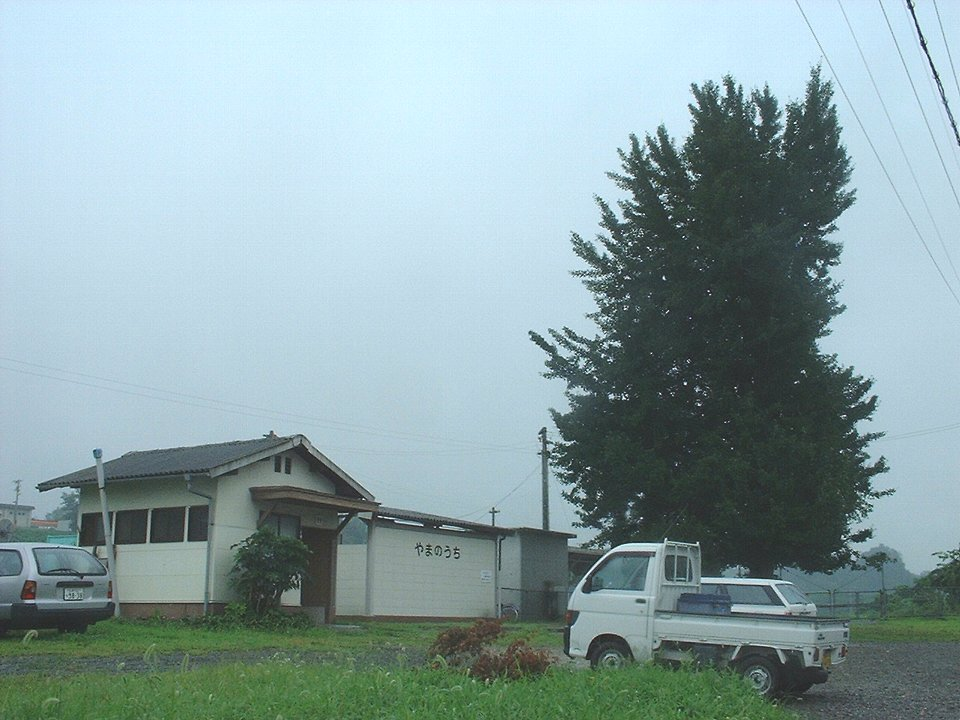
- Yamanouchi Station in August 2002

General information
- Location: Yamanouchi-chō, Shōbara-shi, Hiroshima-ken 729-6131; Japan
- Coordinates: 34°49′47.76″N 132°57′28.17″E
- Operator: JR West
- Line: P Geibi Line
- Distance: 75.2 km (46.7 miles) from Bitchū-Kōjiro
- Platforms: 1 side platform
- Tracks: 1

Other information
- Status: Unstaffed
- Website: Official website

History
- Opened: 20 September 1924

Passengers
- 2019: 1 daily

Services
Preceding station	JR West	Following station
Shimowachi towards Hiroshima	Geibi Line	Nanatsuka towards Niimi
Location
- Location within Hiroshima Prefecture Location within Japan

Yamanouchi Station (山ノ内駅, Yamanouchi-eki) is a passenger railway station located in Yamanouchi-chō, in the city of Shōbara, Hiroshima Prefecture, Japan. It is operated by the West Japan Railway Company (JR West).

== Lines ==
Yamanouchi Station is served by the Geibi Line, and is located 75.2 kilometers from the terminus of the line at Bitchū-Kōjiro and 81.6 kilometers from Niimi.

== Station layout ==
The station consists of one ground-level side platform serving a single bi-directional track. There is no station building and the station is unattended. It used to have an island platform and two tracks, but the track on the station building side (the former inbound track) was removed, and the current bus stop structure is in place.

== History ==
Yamanouchi Station was opened on September 20, 1924 as a station on the Geibi Railway. The line was nationalized on June 1, 1933 and became part of the Shōbara Line. It became part of JR West on April 1, 1987 when Japan National Railways was privatized.

== Passenger statistics ==
In fiscal 2019, the station was used by an average of 36 passengers daily.

== Surrounding area ==
- Shobara Municipal Yamanouchi Elementary School
- Kabutoyama Castle ruins
- Japan National Route 183

== See also ==
- List of railway stations in Japan
