= Karuga Station =

Railway station in Hiroshima, Japan

Karuga Station 狩留家駅
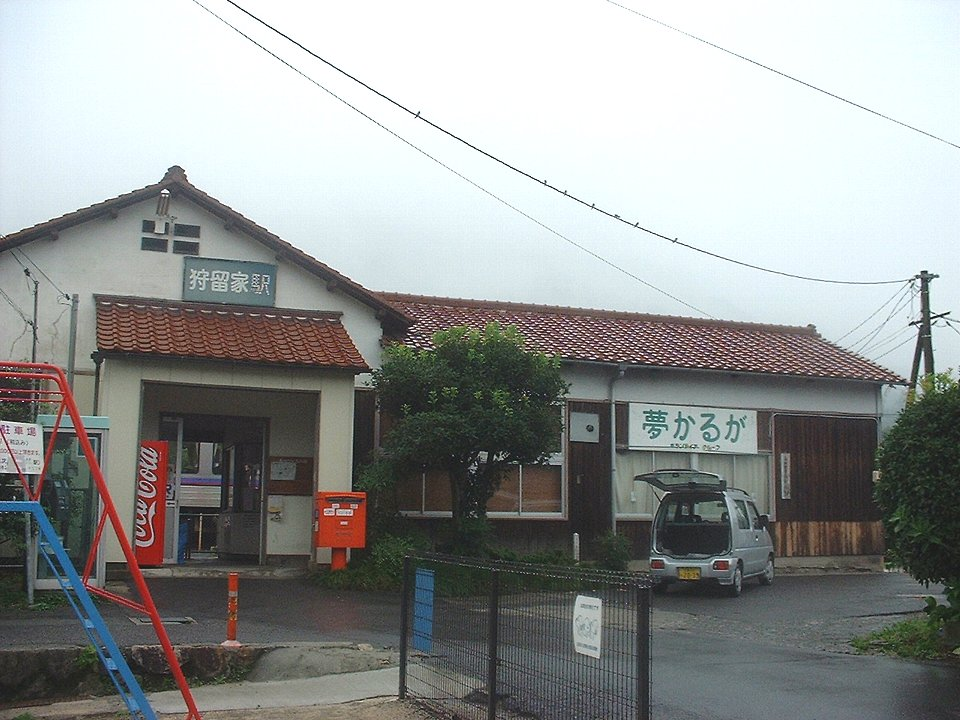
- Karuga Station building (August 2002).

General information
- Location: Asakita-ku, Hiroshima, Hiroshima; Japan
- Operator: JR West
- Line: Geibi Line

History
- Opened: April 28, 1915
Location

Karuga Station (狩留家駅, Karuga-eki) is a JR West Geibi Line station located in Karuga-chō, Asakita-ku, Hiroshima, Hiroshima Prefecture, Japan. The station services many express and local trains daily.

== History ==
- 1915-04-28: Karuga Station opens
- 1937-07-01: Karuga Station is nationalized and becomes part of Japanese National Railways
- 1987-04-01: Japanese National Railways is privatized, and Karuga Station becomes a JR West station

== Station building and platforms ==
Karuga Station features one island platform capable of handling two lines simultaneously. The station building was completed in 1953 and is an old-style wooden building with a tile roof. The station is privately operated under contract from JR West, and tickets can be purchased inside the station building.

=== Environs ===
- Karuga Post Office
- Hiroshima Municipal Kariogawa Elementary School
- Nakayama
- Nabetsuchi Pass
- Misasa River

=== Highway access ===
- Hiroshima Prefectural Route 37 (Hiroshima-Miyoshi Route)

== Connecting lines ==
All lines are JR West lines.

Geibi Line
Miyoshi Express

No stop

Commuter Liner

Shirakiyama Station — Karuga Station — Shimofukawa Station

Miyoshi Liner

Mukaihara Station — Karuga Station — Kamifukawa Station

Local

Shirakiyama Station — Karuga Station — Kamifukawa Station
