= Onuka Station =

Railway station in Shōbara, Hiroshima Prefecture, Japan

Onuka Station 小奴可駅
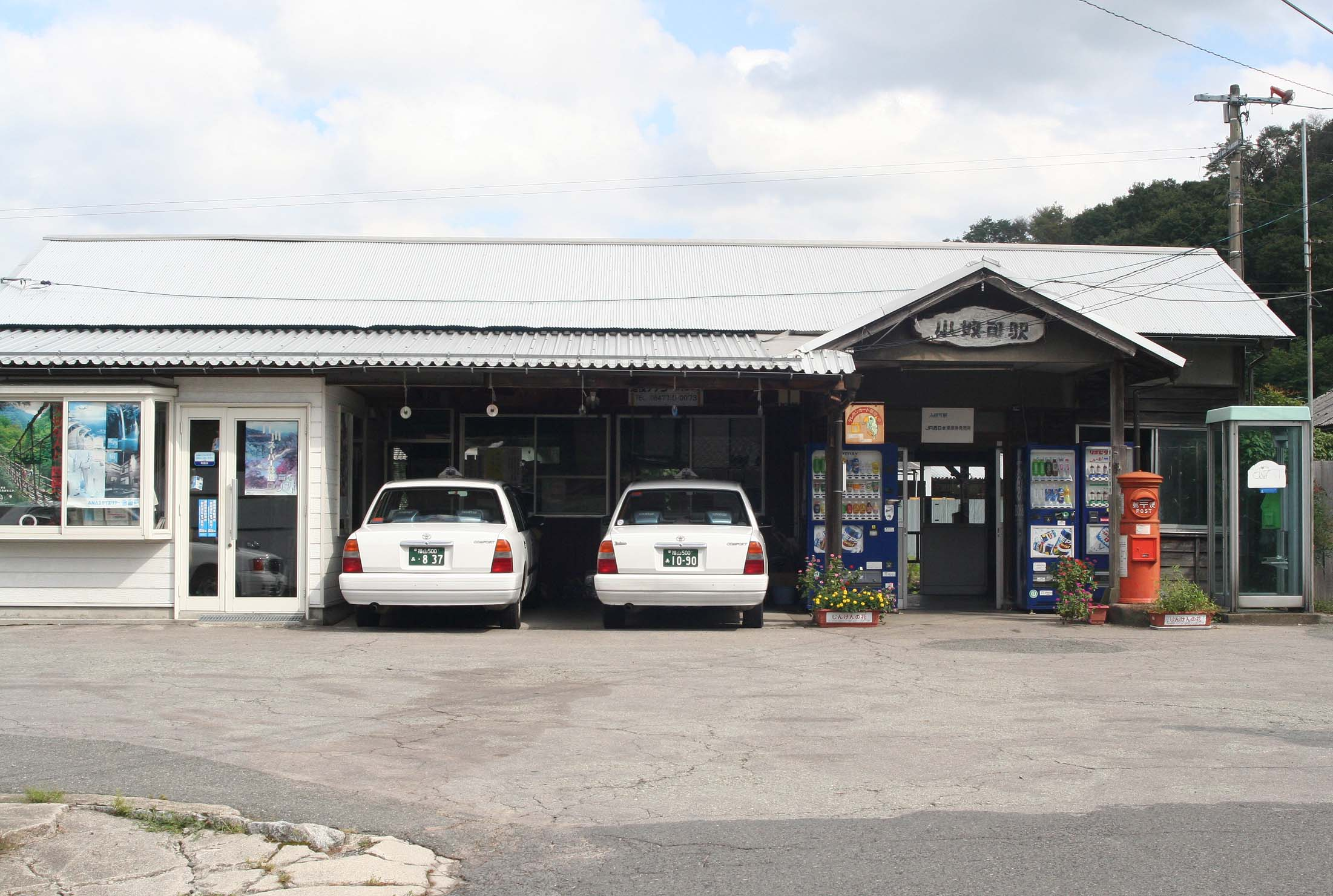
- Onuka Station (September 2007)

General information
- Location: 2581-1 Onuka, Tōjō-chō, Shōbara-shi, Hiroshima-ken 729-5501; Japan
- Coordinates: 34°59′40.51″N 133°12′40.25″E
- Operator: JR West
- Line: P Geibi Line
- Distance: 33.6 km (20.9 miles) from Bitchū-Kōjiro
- Platforms: 1 side platform
- Tracks: 1

Other information
- Status: Staffed
- Website: Official website

History
- Opened: June 15, 1935

Passengers
- 2019: 1 daily
Location
- Location within Hiroshima Prefecture Location within Japan

Onuka Station (小奴可駅, Onuka-eki) is a passenger railway station located in Tōjō-chō, in the city of Shōbara, Hiroshima Prefecture, Japan. It is operated by the West Japan Railway Company (JR West).

== Lines ==
Onuka Station is served by the Geibi Line, and is located 33.6 kilometers from the terminus of the line at Bitchū-Kōjiro and 40.0 kilometers from Niimi.

== Station layout ==
The station consists of one ground-level side platform serving a single bi-directional track. Originally, it was a station with two opposite side platforms and two tracks. The station is staffed as a kantaku station.

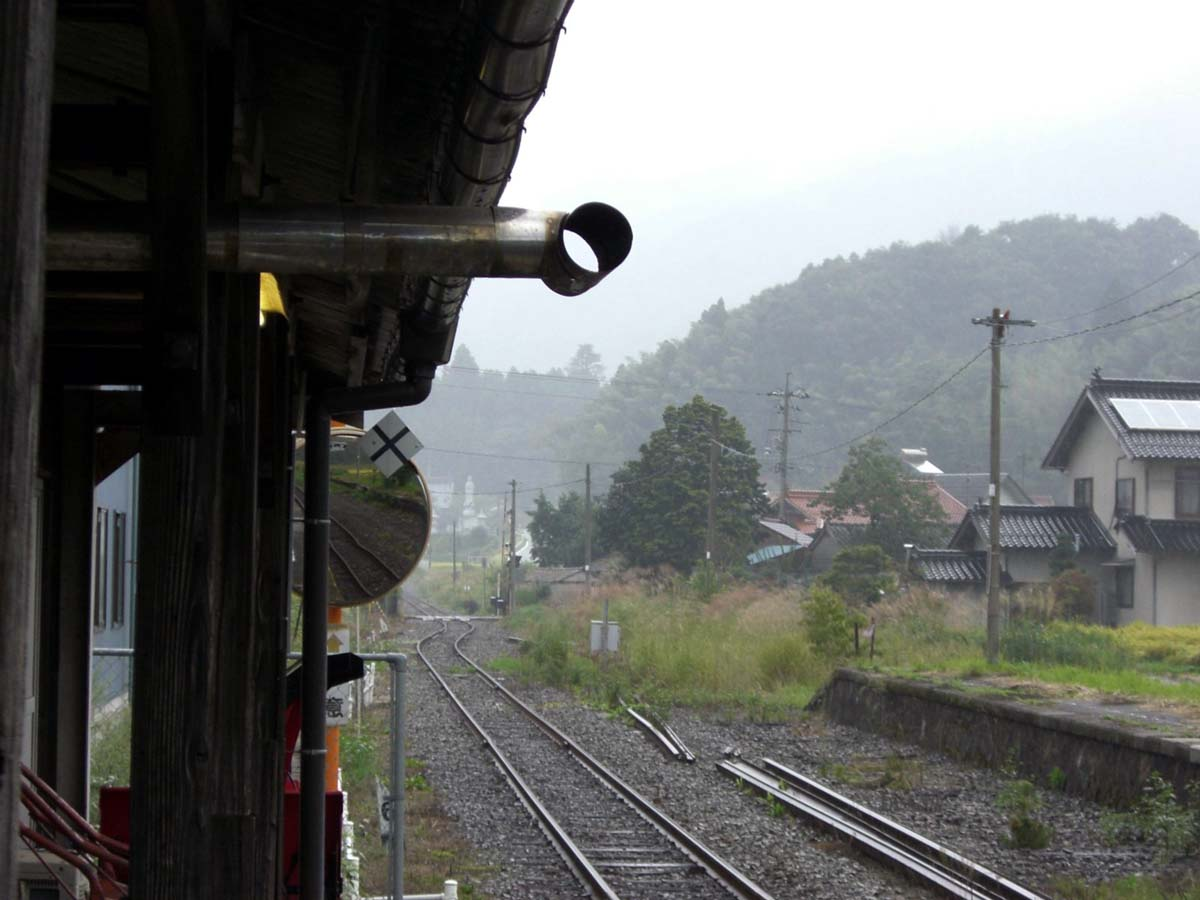
Onuka Station looking toward Bingo Ochiai Station

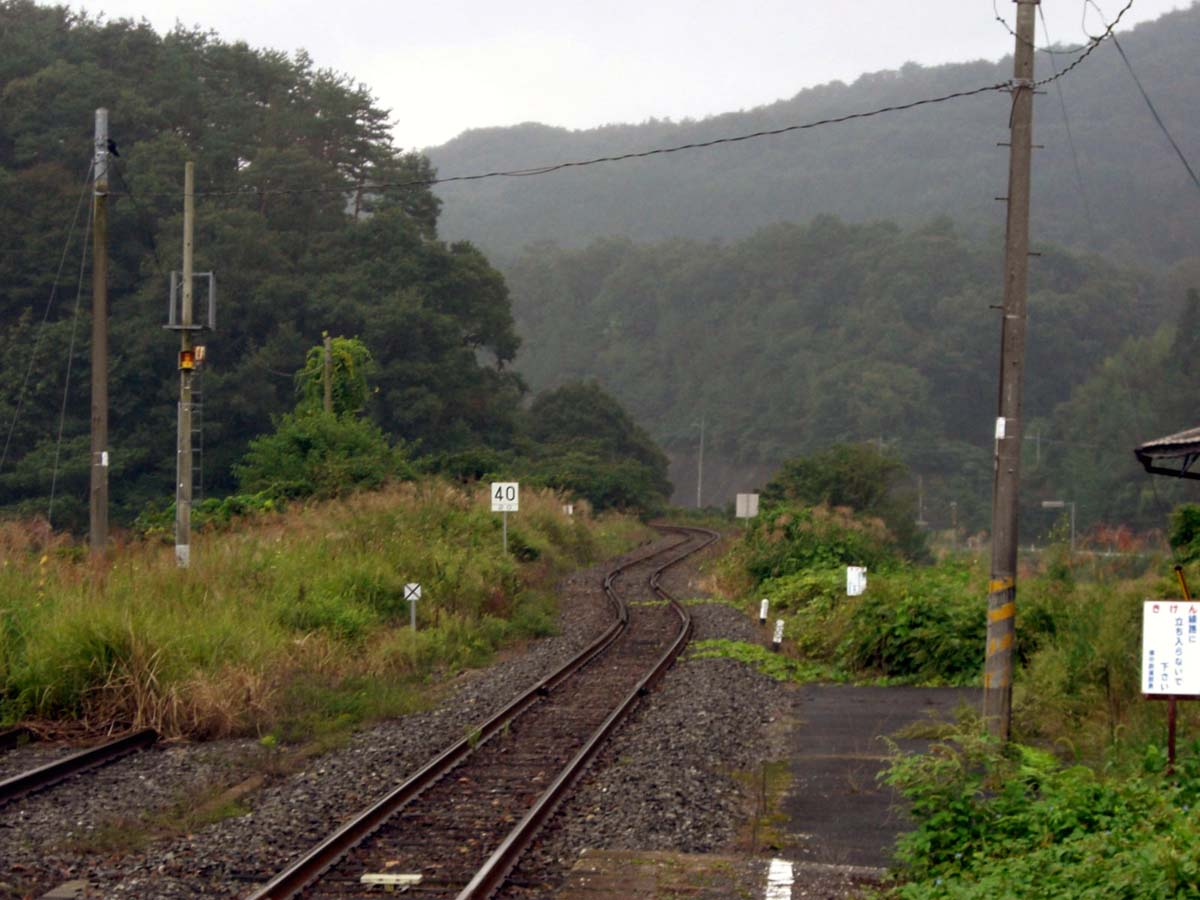
Onuka Station looking toward Tōjō Station

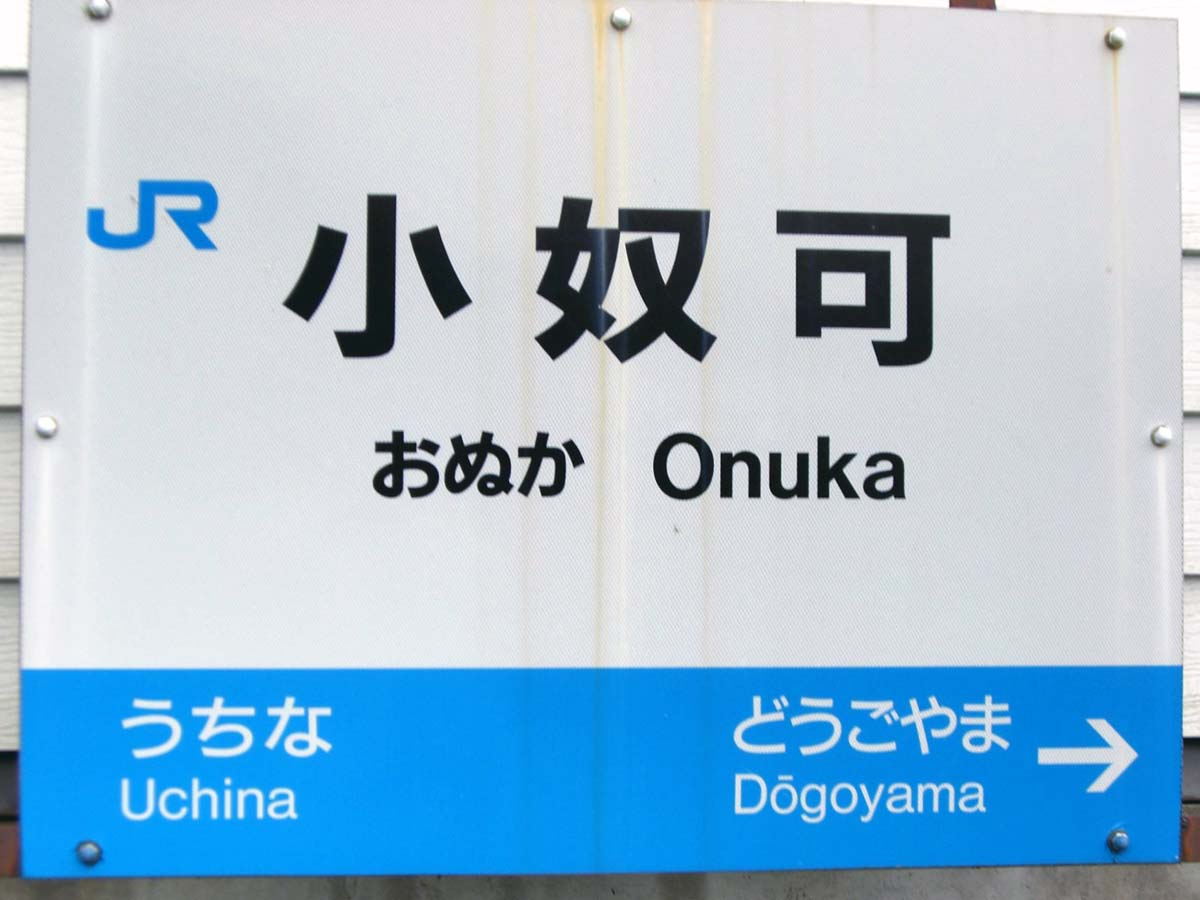
Onuka Station platform sign

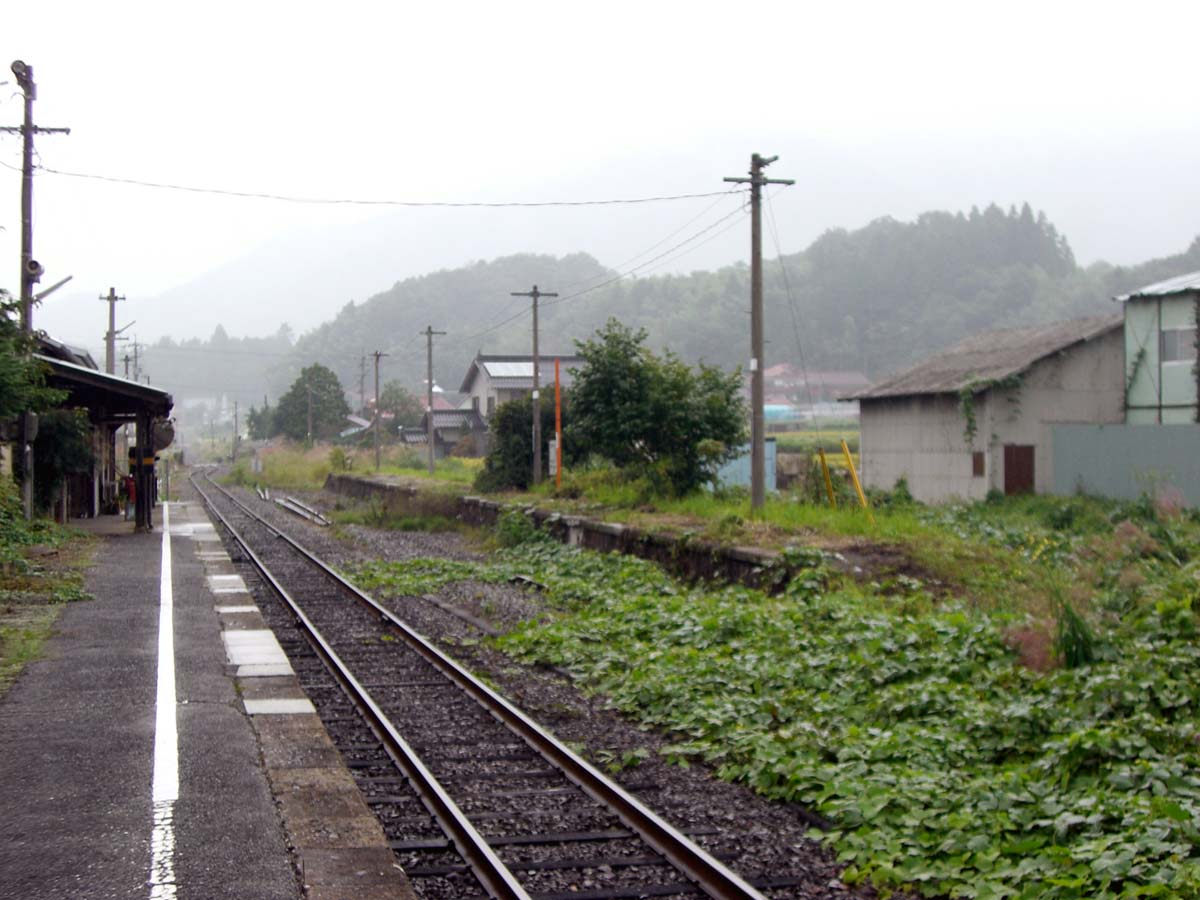
Platform 2 at Onuka Station, no longer in use

== Adjacent stations ==
| « | Service | » |
Geibi Line
| Yagami | Rapid | Bingo Yawata |
| Uchina | Local | Dōgoyama |

== History ==
Onuka Station was opened on June 15, 1935. It became part of JR West on April 1, 1987 when Japan National Railways was privatized.

== Passenger statistics ==
In fiscal 2019, the station was used by an average of 1 passenger daily.

== Surrounding area ==
- Shobara Municipal Onoka Elementary School
- Japan National Route 314

== See also ==
- List of railway stations in Japan
