= Shimowachi Station =

Railway station in Miyoshi, Hiroshima Prefecture, Japan

Shimowachi Station 下和知駅
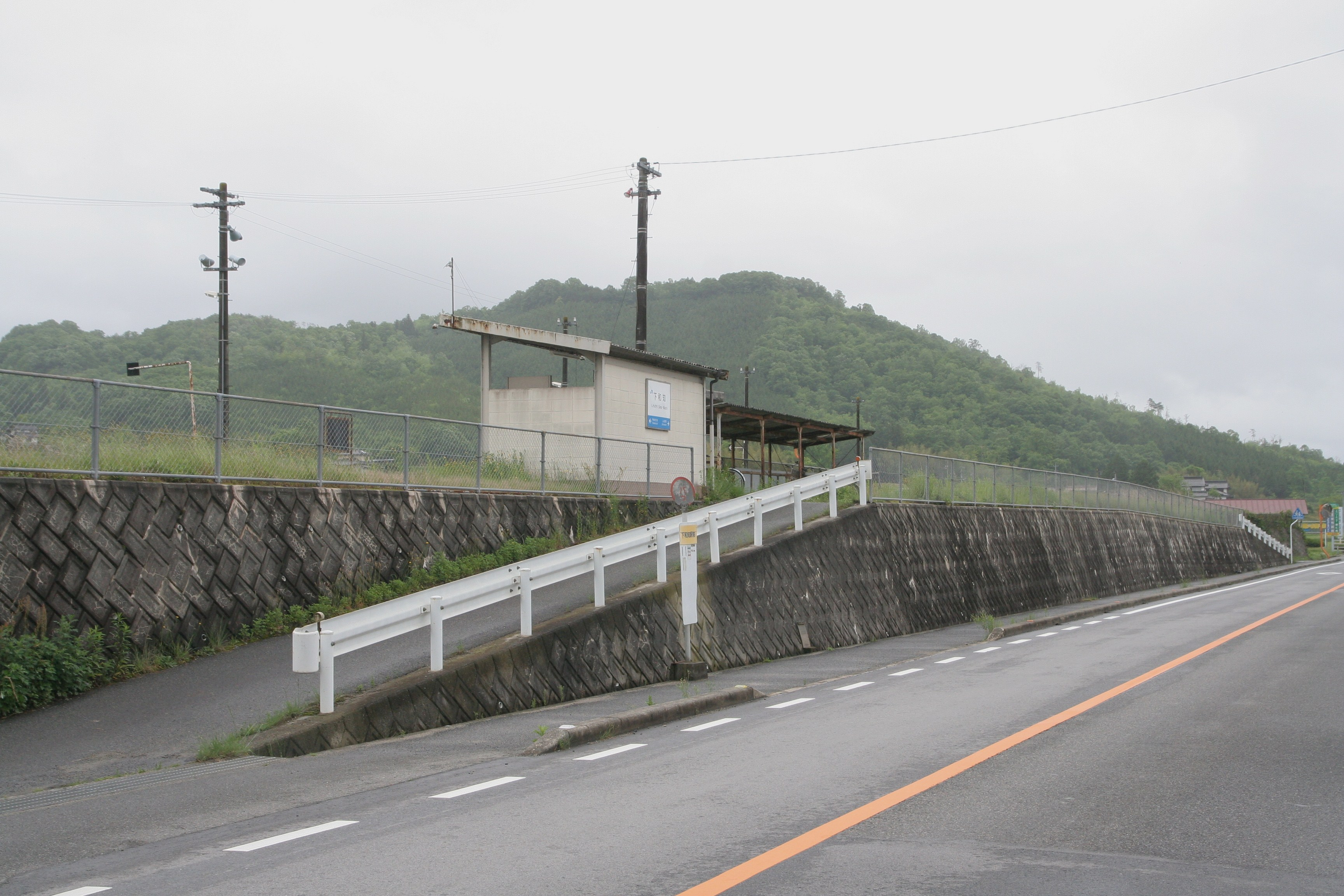
- Shimowachi Station building, May 2010

General information
- Location: Wachi-chō, Miyoshi-shi, Hiroshima-ken 729-6201; Japan
- Coordinates: 34°47′53.26″N 132°55′31.28″E
- Owner: West Japan Railway Company
- Operator: West Japan Railway Company
- Line: P Geibi Line
- Distance: 80.1 km (49.8 miles) from Bitchū-Kōjiro
- Platforms: 1 side platform
- Tracks: 1
- Connections: Bus stop

Construction
- Accessible: Yes

Other information
- Status: Unstaffed
- Website: Official website

History
- Opened: 7 June 1922
- Former names: Wadamura (to 1925)

Passengers
- FY2019: 3

Services
Preceding station	JR West	Following station
Shiomachi towards Hiroshima	Geibi Line	Yamanouchi towards Niimi
Location
- Location within Hiroshima Prefecture Location within Japan

Shimowachi Station (下和知駅, Shimowachi-eki) is a passenger railway station located in the city of Miyoshi, Hiroshima Prefecture, Japan. It is operated by the West Japan Railway Company (JR West).

== Lines ==
Shimowachi Station is served by the JR West Geibi Line, and is located 80.1 kilometers from the terminus of the line at Bitchū-Kōjiro and 86.5 kilometers from Niimi.

== Station layout ==
The station consists of one side platform serving single bidirectional track. It used to have an island platform and a freight platform, but these platforms and tracks have been removed, and the station building demolished and replaced by a concrete block waiting room. The station is unattended.

== History ==
Shimowachi Station was opened on 8 December 1923 as Wadamura Station (和田村駅). It was renamed on 1 February 1925. With the privatization of the Japanese National Railways (JNR) on 1 April 1987, the station came under the control of JR West.

== Passenger statistics ==
In fiscal 2019, the station was used by an average of 3 passengers daily.

== Surrounding area ==
- Miyoshi Municipal Wada Elementary School
- Japan National Route 183

== See also ==
- List of railway stations in Japan
