= Bingo-Shōbara Station =

Railway station in Shōbara, Hiroshima Prefecture, Japan

Bingo Shōbara Station 備後庄原駅
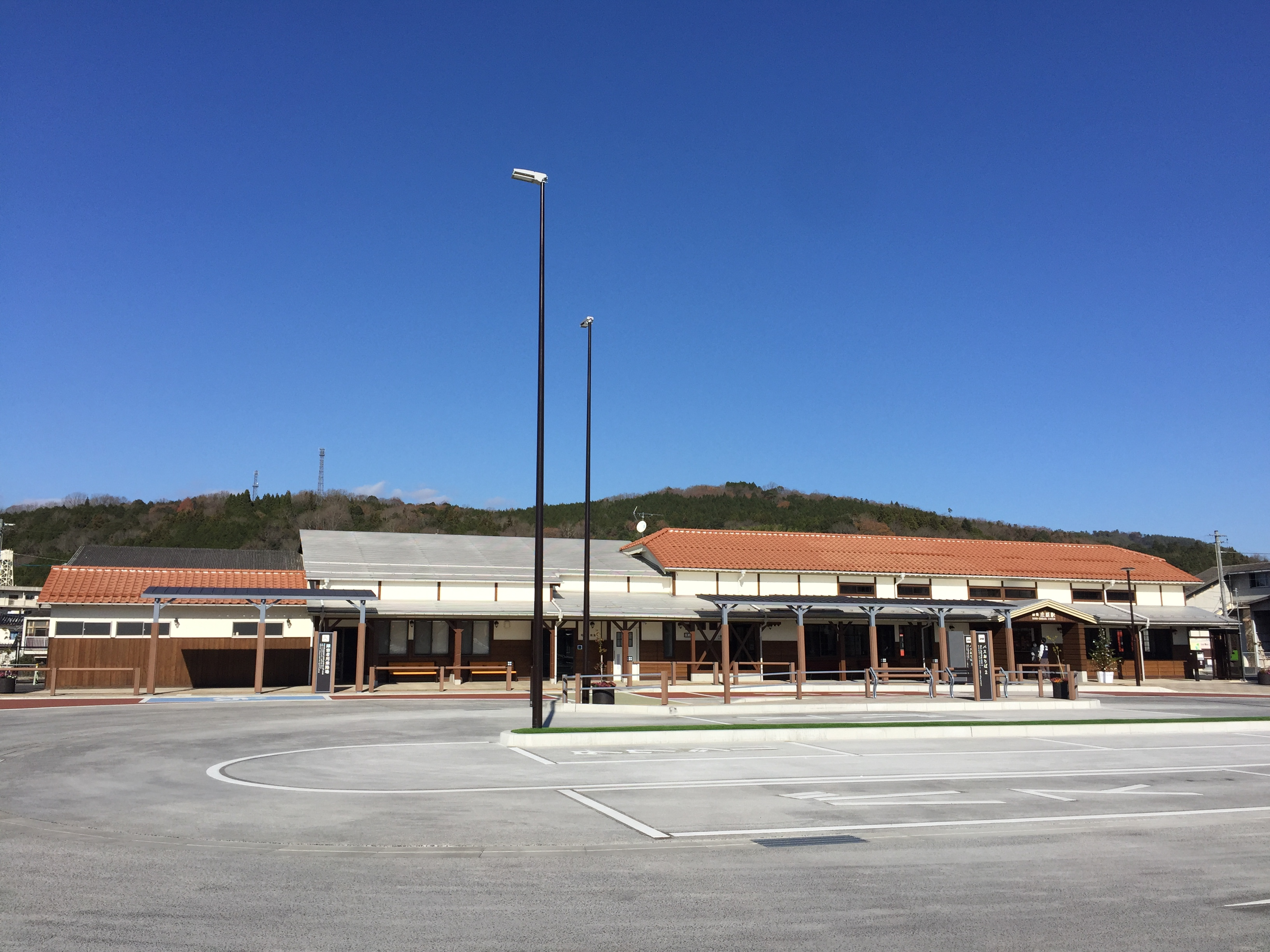
- Bingo Shōbara Station, December 2020

General information
- Location: 2-chōme-13 Nakahonmachi, Shōbara-shi, Hiroshima-ken 727-0012; Japan
- Coordinates: 34°51′44.03″N 133°0′59.55″E
- Operator: JR West
- Line: P Geibi Line
- Distance: 68.5 km (42.6 miles) from Bitchū-Kōjiro
- Platforms: 1 side + 1 island platform
- Tracks: 3

Other information
- Status: Staffed
- Website: Official website

History
- Opened: 8 December 1923

Passengers
- 2019: 127 daily

Services
Preceding station	JR West	Following station
Bingo-Mikkaichi towards Hiroshima	Geibi Line	Taka towards Niimi
Location
- Location within Hiroshima Prefecture Location within Japan

Bingo-Shōbara Station (備後庄原駅, Bingo-Shōbara-eki) is a passenger railway station located in the city of Shōbara, Hiroshima Prefecture, Japan. It is operated by the West Japan Railway Company (JR West). The station was a stop for the former Chidori and Taishaku express trains from Miyoshi.

== Lines ==
Bingo-Shōbara Station is served by the Geibi Line, and is located 68.5 kilometers from the terminus of the line at Bitchū-Kōjiro and 72.9 kilometers from Niimi.

== Station layout ==
The station consists of one side platform and one island platform. The station building is located next to the side platform, and is connected to the island platform via a footbridge. There are multiple dead-end sidings on the premises. The station is staffed.

=== Platforms ===
1	■ P Geibi Line	for Miyoshi and Hiroshima
2	■ P Geibi Line	for Bingo-Ochiai

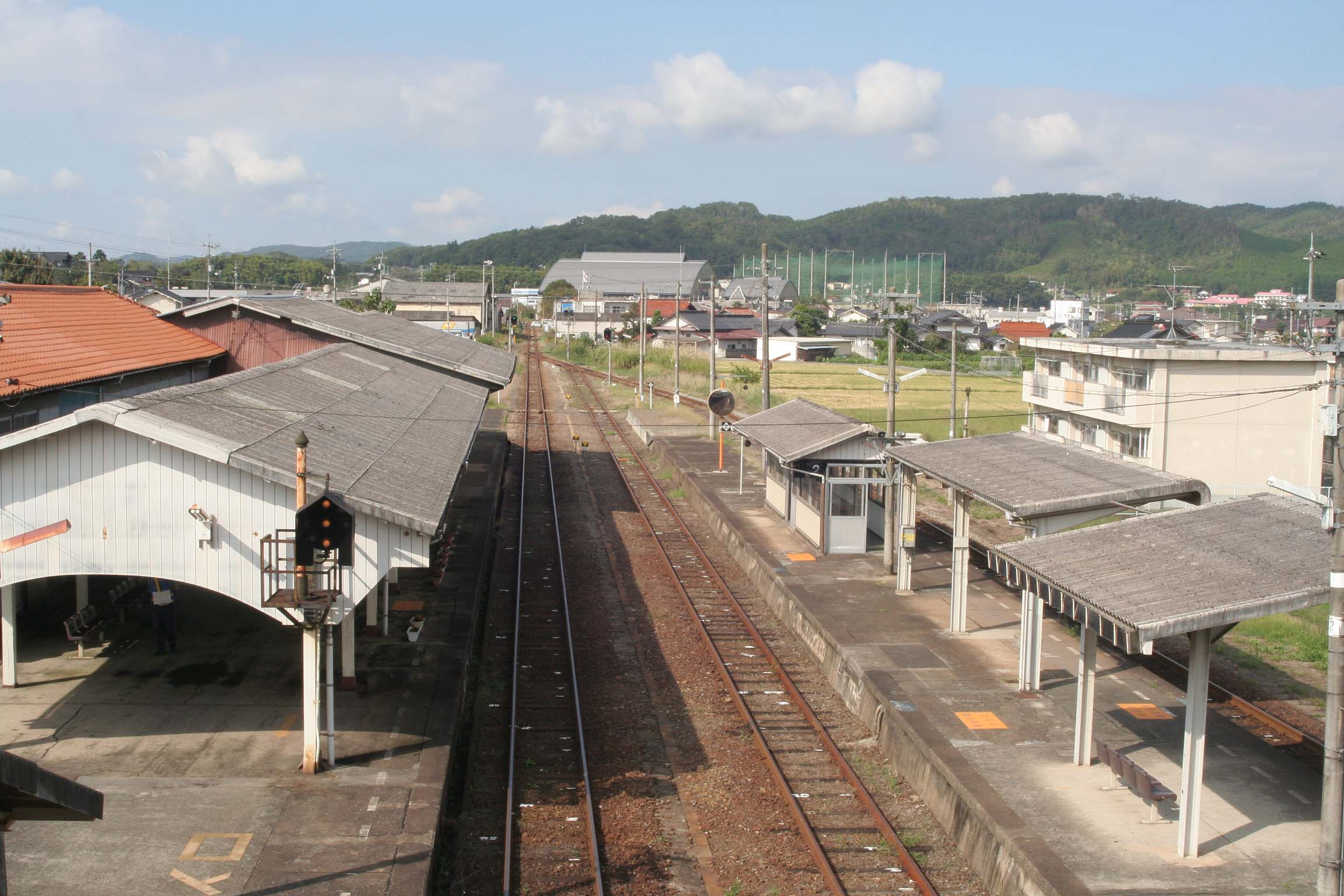
View from the footbridge

== History ==
Bingo-Shōbara Station was opened on December 8, 1923. It became part of JR West on April 1, 1987, when Japan National Railways was privatized.

== Passenger statistics ==
In fiscal 2019, the station was used by an average of 127 passengers daily.

== Surrounding area ==
- Shobara City Hall
- Hiroshima Prefectural Shobara Kakuchi High School
- Hiroshima Prefectural Shobara Industrial High School
- Shobara Red Cross Hospital

== See also ==
- List of railway stations in Japan
