= Tsunami Station =

Former railway station in Hiroshima Prefecture, Japan

Tsunami Station 「津浪駅」を編集中
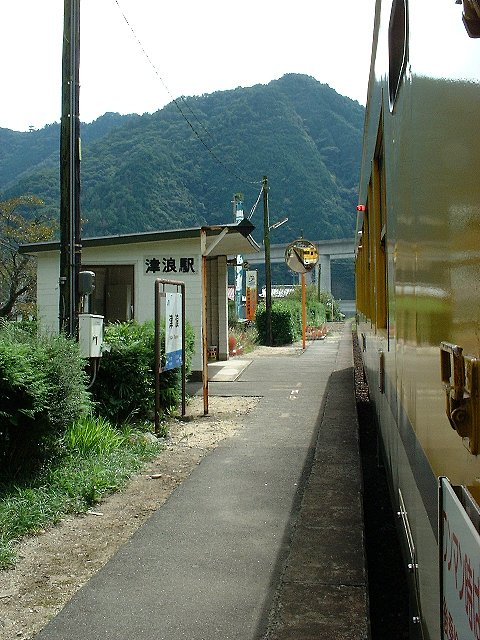
- Tsunami Station in 2003

General information
- Location: Tsutsuga, Yamagata District, Hiroshima Prefecture; Japan
- Coordinates: 34°34′50.47″N 132°19′14.44″E
- Line: Kabe Line
- Distance: 42.5 km ( starting from Yokogawa )
- Platforms: 1
- Tracks: 1

History
- Opened: 30 March 1954
- Closed: 1 December 2003
- Original company: JR West

Passengers
- 2002: 13 people/day (excluding passengers getting off)
Location

Tsunami Station (津浪駅, Tsunami-eki) is a former JR West Kabe Line station located in Tsutsuga, Yamagata District, Hiroshima Prefecture, Japan. It closed on December 1, 2003, when operation of the line was discontinued/suspended between Kabe Station and Sandankyō Station.

== Chronology ==
- March 30, 1954: Opened as a passenger station on the Japanese National Railways Kabe Line.
- April 1, 1987: Became a station of West Japan Railway Company due to the privatization of Japanese National Railways.
- December 1, 2003: Abolished

== Origin of station name ==
It is named after the large area around the station. The name was originally Tsunamimura. It is said that the name comes from a landslide (mountain tsunami).

== Station structure ==
It was an above-ground station with only one single platform and one track. The station was unstaffed, and there was no station building, just a shelter next to the platform.

== Around the station ==
It is a mountainous area. The Kabe Line and National Route 191 run along the Ota River, and the station was built adjacent to the national highway. National Route 433 branches off from National Route 191 about 130 meters north of the station. About 500 meters south of the station, following a small river that flows into the Ota River, about 800 meters up, there is the Kake Town's former Tsunami Elementary School. Further south is the Chugoku Expressway viaduct crossing the Ota River.

== A campaign to keep the station open linked the station name to a hit song of the time ==
The song "TSUNAMI" by Southern All Stars was a hit song in 2000. A campaign called "Let's call on Keisuke and revitalize the local area" was held. In line with the trial increase in train services from November 2000, the "TSUNAMI Squad" was formed, consisting mainly of young people living in Hiroshima City and local residents. The goal was to have Keisuke Kuwata visit Tsunami Station, attract many Southern fans, and keep the Kabe Line running. They also sang "TSUNAMI" at events, and were featured in many local media outlets as a central activity in the Kabe Line survival movement. In fact, Keisuke Kuwata, the band's frontman, covered this issue on his radio show, but he never sang at Tsunami Station. When the station was abolished, a "273 (Tsunami) People's Tsunami Chorus" was held. Even after the partial closure of the Kabe Line, the TSUNAMI Team continues to engage in exchange activities with local residents as of February 2011.

== Current situation ==
"Plat Home Connection" was constructed in 2011 at the site of the station.

== Lines ==
- West Japan Railway Company
  - Kabe Line

== Adjacent stations ==
«	Service	»
Kabe Line
Tanoshiri	-	Kagusa
