= Kisaka Station =

Former railway station in Hiroshima Prefecture, Japan

Coordinates: 34°36′7.11″N 132°18′14.09″E

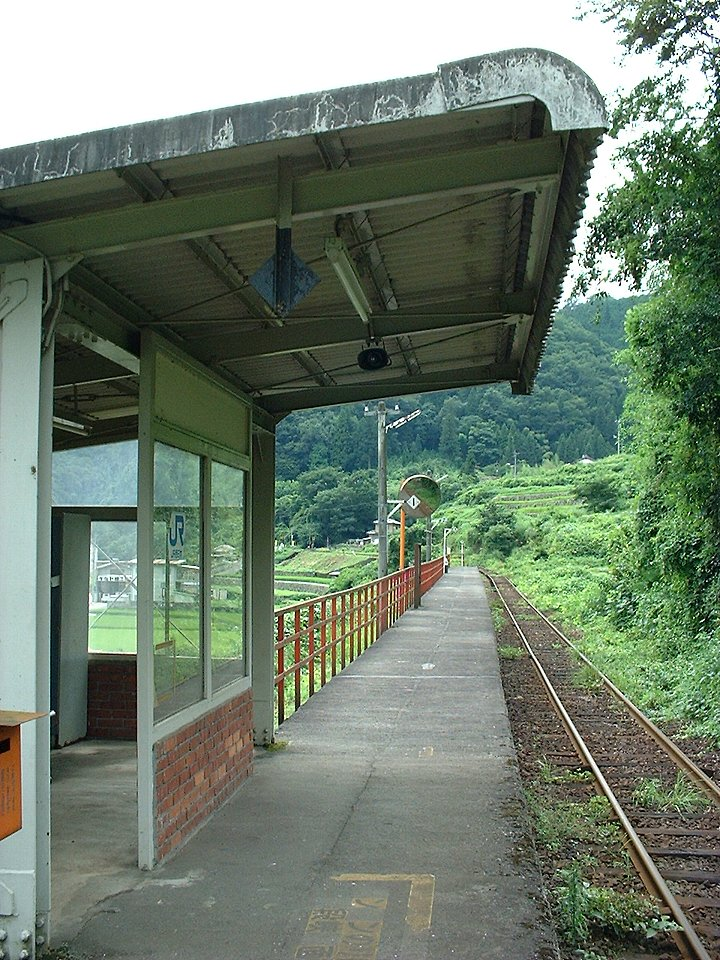
The station in August 2003

Kisaka Station (木坂駅, Kisaka-eki) is a former JR West Kabe Line station located in Kake, Yamagata District, Hiroshima Prefecture, Japan. It closed on December 1, 2003, when operation of the line was discontinued/suspended between Kabe Station and Sandankyō Station.

== Lines ==
- West Japan Railway Company
  - Kabe Line

== Adjacent stations ==
«	Service	»
Kabe Line
Kake	-	Tonoga
