= Togōchi Station =

Railway station in Japan

Coordinates: 34°34′37.44″N 132°13′38.31″E

Togōchi Station 戸河内駅
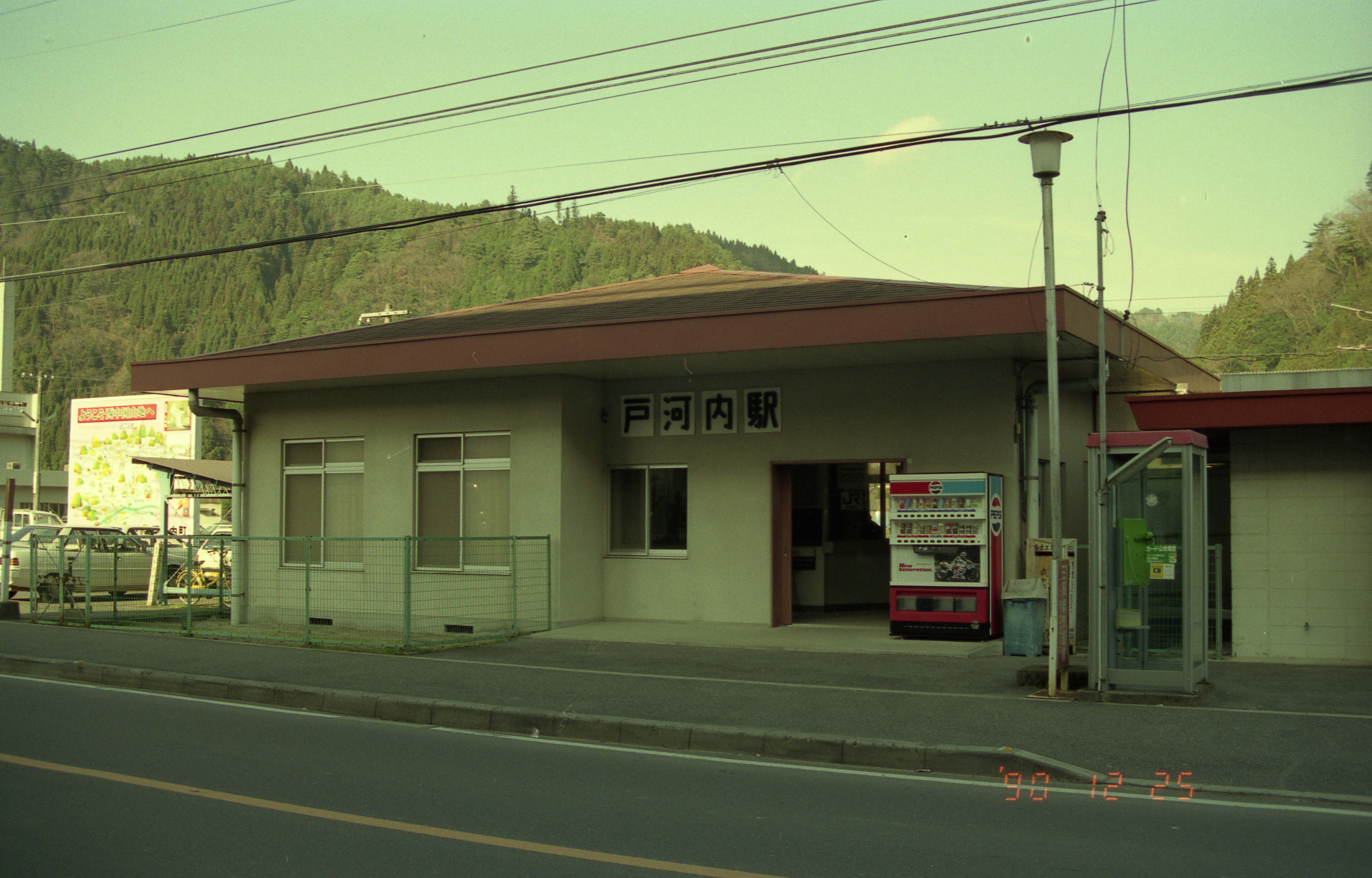
- Togōchi Station in 1990

General information
- Location: Togouchi, Yamagata, Hiroshima; Japan
- Operator: JR West
- Line: Kabe Line

History
- Opened: 1969
- Closed: 2003
Location

Togōchi Station (戸河内駅, Togōchi-eki) is a former JR West Kabe Line station located in Togouchi, Yamagata District, Hiroshima Prefecture, Japan. It closed on December 1, 2003, when operation of the line was discontinued/suspended between Kabe Station and Sandankyō Station.

== History ==
The station was opened as a part of section between Sandankyō Station and Kake Station on 27 July 1969. The station was abolished when the section between Sandankyō - Kabe Station was closed.

== Station layout ==
An above-ground station with an island platform and 2 tracks. Initially, replacement equipment was used, but in its last years, due to token block system it was practically made to (the rail on the south side of the island platform was left, but the point was fixed, and all traffic lights in the premises were stopped and turned off), and only the north side of the island platform was used. The station building and the platform were connected by a down-bound track and a plane crossing passage, and went up to the platform from the east side.

== Surrounding area ==
- Akiōta town hall

== Lines ==
This station was formerly served by Kabe Line.

== Adjacent stations ==
«	Service	»
Kabe Line (~2003)
Doi	-	Sandankyō
