= Kamitono Station =

Former railway station in Hiroshima Prefecture, Japan

Coordinates: 34°34′38.33″N 132°16′18.56″E

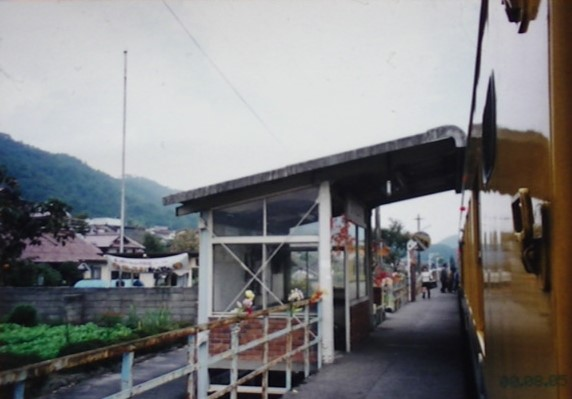
JR Kabe line, Kamitono station

Kamitono Station (上殿駅, Kamitono-eki) is a former JR West Kabe Line station located in Togouchi, Yamagata District, Hiroshima Prefecture, Japan. It closed on December 1, 2003, when operation of the line was discontinued/suspended between Kabe Station and Sandankyō Station.

== Lines ==
- West Japan Railway Company
  - Kabe Line

== Adjacent stations ==
| « | Service | » |
Kabe Line
| Tonoga | - | Tsutsuga |
