= Kagusa Station =

Former railway station in Hiroshima Prefecture, Japan

Coordinates: 34°35′50.92″N 132°19′20.37″E

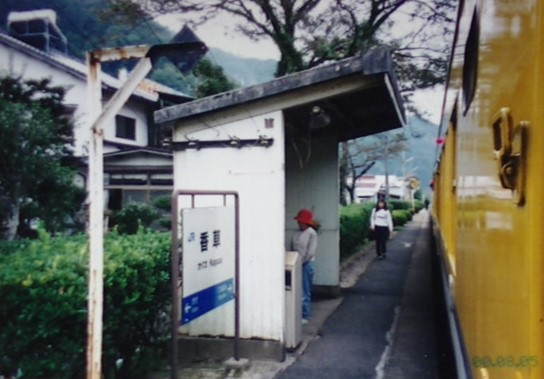
JR Kabe line Kagusa station 2003

Kagusa Station (香草駅, Kagusa-eki) is a former JR West Kabe Line station located in Tsutsuga, Yamagata District, Hiroshima Prefecture, Japan. It closed on December 1, 2003, when operation of the line was discontinued/suspended between Kabe Station and Sandankyō Station.

== Lines ==
- West Japan Railway Company
  - Kabe Line

== Adjacent stations ==
«	Service	»
Kabe Line
Tsunami	-	Kake
