= Yasuno Station =

Former railway station in Hiroshima Prefecture, Japan

Coordinates: 34°33′15.49″N 132°22′48.76″E

Yasuno Station (安野駅, Yasuno-eki) is a former JR West Kabe Line station located in Kake, Yamagata District, Hiroshima Prefecture, Japan. It closed on December 1, 2003, when operation of the line was discontinued/suspended between Kabe Station and Sandankyō Station.

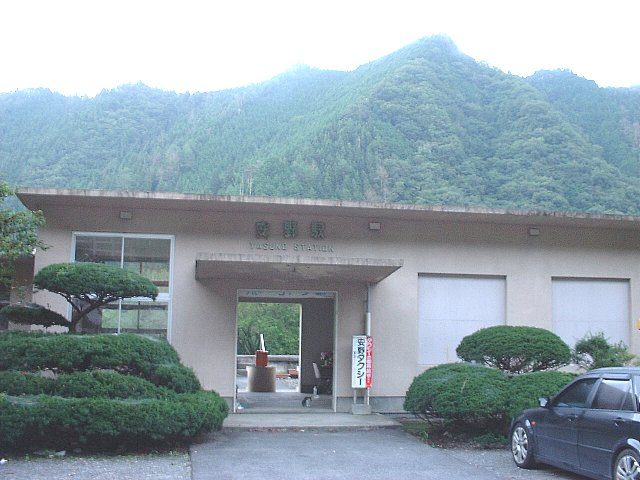
Yasuno Station

== Lines ==
- West Japan Railway Company
  - Kabe Line

== Adjacent stations ==
«	Service	»
Kabe Line
Ogauchi	-	Minochi
