= Doi Station (Hiroshima) =

Former railway station in Togouchi, Japan

Coordinates: 34°34′22.6″N 132°14′12.53″E

Doi Station 土居駅
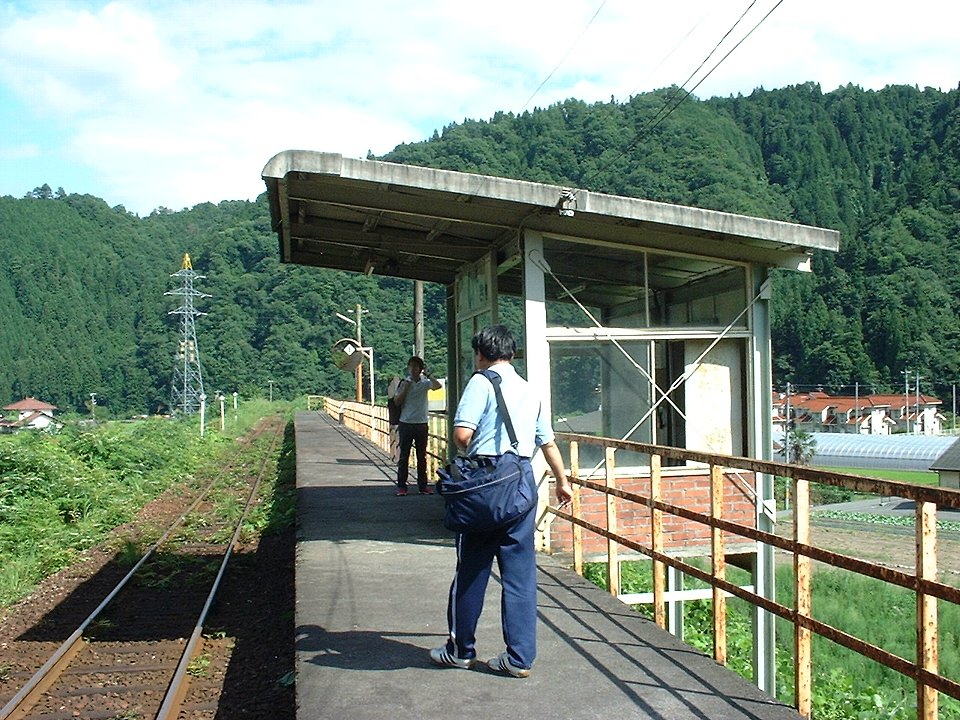
- Doi Station (August 2003)

General information
- Location: Doi, Togouchi, Yamagata, Hiroshima, Hiroshima; Japan
- Operator: JR West
- Line: Kabe Line

History
- Opened: 1969
- Closed: 2003
Location

Doi Station (土居駅, Doi-eki) is a former JR West Kabe Line station located in Togouchi, Yamagata District, Hiroshima Prefecture, Japan. It closed on December 1, 2003, when operation of the line was discontinued/suspended between Kabe Station and Sandankyō Station.

== History ==
The station was opened as a part of section between Sandankyō Station and Kake Station on 27 July 1969. The station was abolished when the section between Sandankyō station and Kabe Station was closed.

== Lines ==
The station was formerly served by Kabe Line.

== Adjacent stations ==
«	Service	»
Kabe Line (~2003)
Tsutsuga	-	Togōchi
