= Tsutsuga Station =

Former Railway Station in Hiroshima Prefecture, Japan

Coordinates: 34°33′52.39″N 132°15′19.28″E

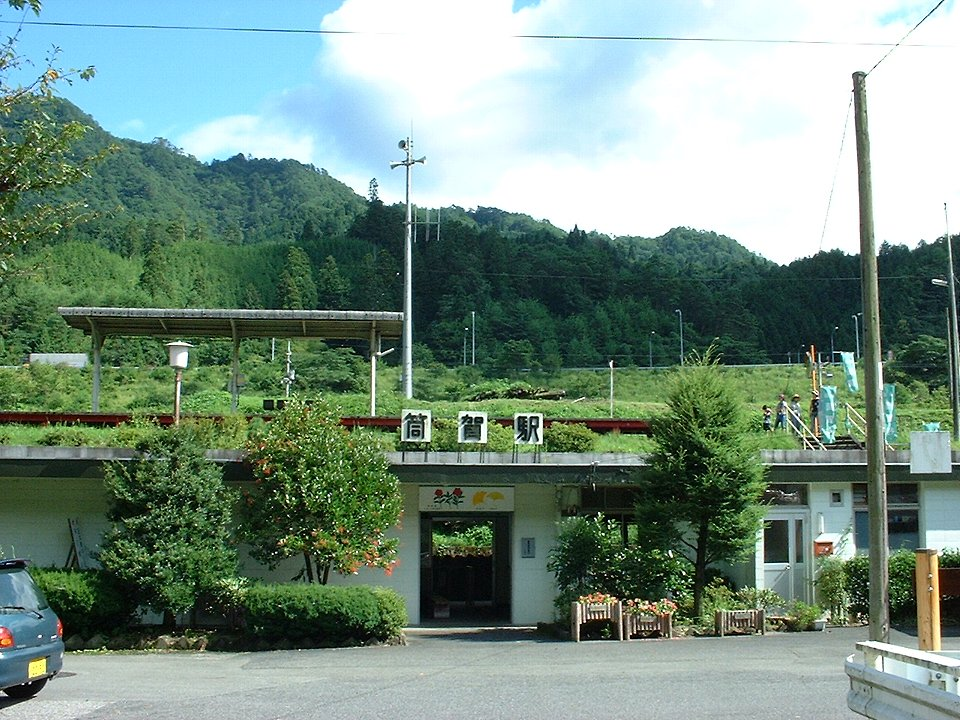
Tsutsuga Stations

Tsutsuga Station (筒賀駅, Tsutsuga-eki) is a former JR West Kabe Line station located in Tsutsuga, Yamagata District, Hiroshima Prefecture, Japan. It closed on December 1, 2003 when operation of the line was discontinued/suspended between Kabe Station and Sandankyō Station.

== Lines ==
- West Japan Railway Company
  - Kabe Line

== Adjacent stations ==
«	Service	»
Kabe Line
Kamitono	-	Doi
