= Minochi Station =

Former railway station in Hiroshima Prefecture, Japan

Coordinates: 34°33′8.03″N 132°20′43.43″E

Minochi Station (水内駅, Minochi-eki) is a former JR West Kabe Line station located in Yuki, Saeki District, Hiroshima Prefecture, Japan. It closed on December 1, 2003, when operation of the line was discontinued/suspended between Kabe Station and Sandankyō Station.

== Lines ==
- West Japan Railway Company
  - Kabe Line

== Adjacent stations ==
«	Service	»
Kabe Line
Yasuno	-	Tsubono
