= Imaida Station =

Closed railway station in Hiroshima Prefecture, Japan

Coordinates: 34°30′42″N 132°28′31″E

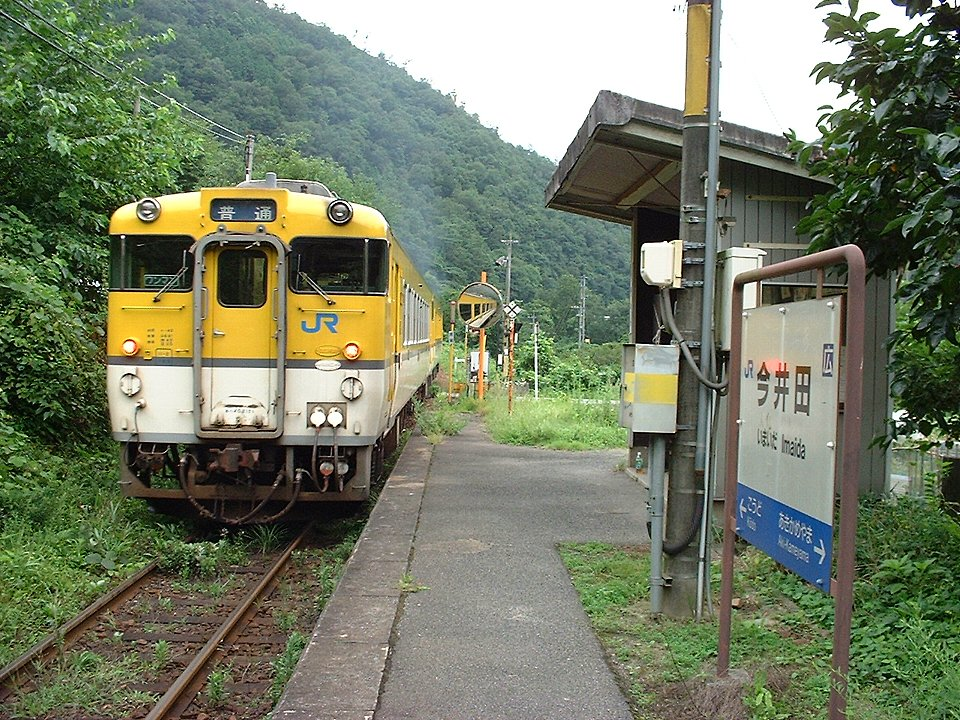
The Imaida Station platform (2003-08-16).

Imaida Station (今井田駅, Imaida Eki) is a former JR West Kabe Line station located in Imaida, Kabe-chō, Asakita-ku, Hiroshima, Hiroshima Prefecture, Japan. It closed on December 1, 2003 when operation of the line was discontinued/suspended between Kabe Station and Sandankyō Station.

== History ==
- 1956-12-20: Imaida Station opens along with several other stations along the Kabe Line
- 1972-04-01: After Kabe-chō became part of Hiroshima City, the area around the station was renamed Imaida, Kabe-chō, Hiroshima
- 1973: Imaida Station becomes a Hiroshima City station
- 1980-04-01: After Hiroshima becomes a designated city, the area around the station is renamed Imaida, Kabe-chō, Asakita-ku, Hiroshima
- 1987-04-01: Japanese National Railways is privatized, and Kōdo Station becomes a JR West station
- 2003-12-01: Imaida Station closes along with the rest of the non-electrified section of the Kabe Line

=== Blue Station ===
Imaida Station was the setting for the Sonoko Kawai 1986-03-21 single Blue Station (青いスタスィオン, Aoi Sutasion). At the time Kawai was a member of the popular idol group Onyanko Club, and the single debuted at #1 on the Oricon charts, unseating a song by Onyanko Club.

== Station building ==
Imaida Station features one side platform capable of handling one line, and featuring an enclosed waiting area. The station was unstaffed before this section of the Kabe Line was closed. The station building is located in a largely residential area, and is used as a meeting place despite the station name placard being removed.

=== Environs ===
The Ōta River is approximately 150 meters to the southeast of the station.

=== Highway access ===
- Hiroshima Prefectural Route 177 (Shimosa Higashi Route)
- Hiroshima Prefectural Route 267 (Utsu-Kabe Route)

== Connecting lines ==
This information is historical as all stations on this part of the Kabe Line are currently suspended from regular service.

Kabe Line
Kōdo Station — Imaida Station — Aki-Kameyama Station
