= Surugamaru Castle =

Castle in Kitahiroshima, Hiroshima, Japan

- 駿河丸城
- Kitahiroshima, Hiroshima Prefecture, Japan

Site information
- Type: Mountaintop style Japanese castle
- Controlled by: Kikkawa clan

Location
- Surugamaru Castle Surugamaru Castle (Japan)
- Coordinates: 34°46′42.0″N 132°27′40.0″E

Site history
- Built: c.1331
- Built by: Kikkawa Tsunetaka
- In use: Nanboku-chō period
- Demolished: c.1380
- National Historic Site of Japan

Surugamaru Castle (駿河丸城, Surugamaru-jō) was a Japanese castle located in Kitahiroshima, Hiroshima Prefecture. Its ruins have been protected by the central government as a National Historic Site since 1986 as part of the "Kikkawa clan fortification ruins" along with Ogurayama Castle and Hinoyama Castle.

== Overview ==
The Kikkawa clan (吉川氏, Kikkawa-shi) was a prominent samurai clan of Japan's Sengoku period. The founder of the clan, Kikkawa Tsuneyoshi (吉川経義), took his name from his estates in Suruga Province. He distinguished himself by the destruction of Kajiwara Kagetoki and this clan on orders of the Kamakura shogunate and received an estate in Harima Province. The clan further received an estate called Ōasa-no-shō in Aki Province for their services in the Jōkyū War. In 1313, Kikkawa Tsunetaka grew concerned with the increasing instability of the Kamakura shogunate and relocated his family and retainers to his estate in Aki. Around this time, he constructed Surugamaru Castle as his stronghold. The Kikkawa clan resided here for some 70 years until Kikkawa Tsunemi built nearby Ogurayama Castle near the end of the Nanboku-chō period and Surugamaru Castle was abandoned.

The castle was located on the top of two adjacent hills, with an elevation of only around 30 meters. It consisted of a number of enclosures protected by dry moats and earthworks. The western hill group consists of the Honmaru (Main bailey), Ni-no-maru, and a small enclosure between them. The main enclosure, which forms a triangle with sides of 30 meters, and the Ni-no-maru enclosure to the northwest are surrounded by a one to two meter-high earthwork. The eastern hill group consists of a central two-tiered enclosure and surrounding small enclosures and dry moats, and is independent of the western group. On a slightly elevated area at the southern foot of the castle, the foundations of a residence and shards of haji ware pottery have been found.

Very little remains of these fortifications today, and there is not even any definite evidence that the castle was actually even called "Surugamaru Castle".

== See also ==
- List of Historic Sites of Japan (Hiroshima)
