= Kegi Station =

Former railway station in Hiroshima Prefecture, Japan

Coordinates: 34°31′54″N 132°26′12″E

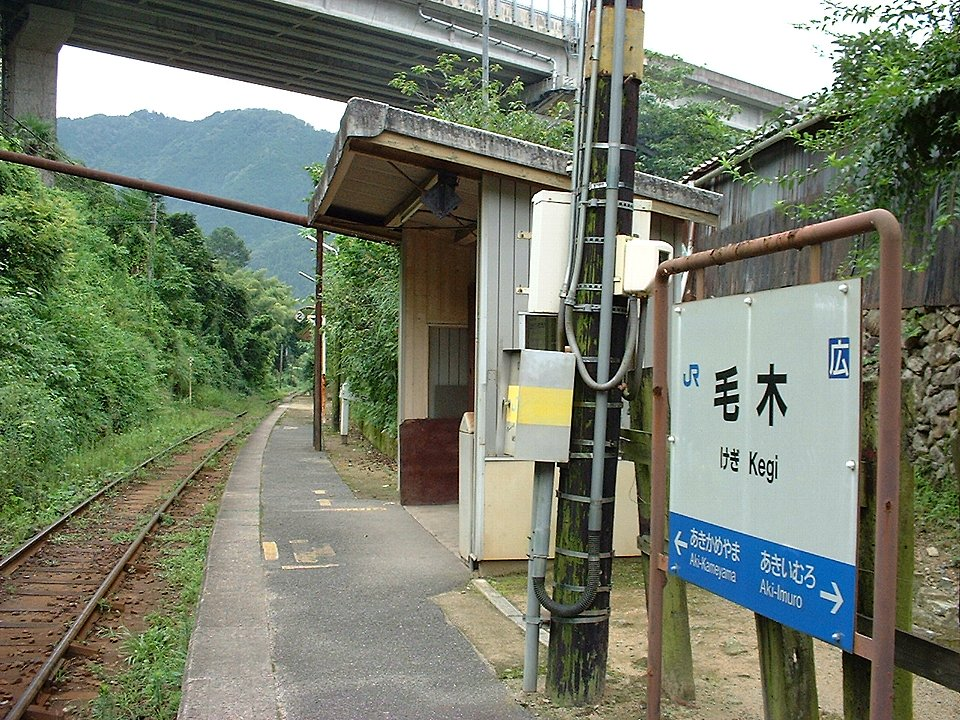
The Kegi Station platform looking toward Aki-Kameyama Station (August 16, 2003).

Kegi Station (毛木駅, Kegi Eki) is a former JR West Kabe Line station located in Iimuro, Asa-machi, Asakita-ku, Hiroshima, Hiroshima Prefecture, Japan. The station is located near Jinshin Bridge, and was going to be named after the bridge. However, when it came time to name the station, the residents in the area wanted it named Kegi, after the area in which it was located. It closed on December 1, 2003, when operation of the line was discontinued/suspended between Kabe Station and Sandankyō Station.

== History ==
- 1956-12-20: Kegi Station opens
- 1971-05-20: After the merging of Asa-machi, Asa District into the city of Hiroshima, the area around the station is renamed Iimuro, Kabe-chō, Asa-machi, Hiroshima
- 1973: Kegi Station becomes a Hiroshima City station
- 1980-04-01: After Hiroshima becomes a designated city, the area around the station is renamed Iimuro, Asa-machi, Asakita-ku, Hiroshima
- 1987-04-01: Japanese National Railways is privatized, and Kegi Station becomes a JR West station
- 2003-12-01: Kegi Station closes along with the rest of the non-electrified section of the Kabe Line

== Station building ==
Kegi Station is located just northwest of and below an overpass for the Hiroshima Expressway. It features one side platform capable of handling one line, and featuring an enclosed waiting area. The station is unstaffed, and the station building is covered, but only enclosed on three sides.

=== Environs ===
The Ōta River is approximately 300 meters southwest of Kegi Station. Most of Asa-machi is located on the opposite shore of the Ōta River. The Kegi Civic Hall is located about 80 km northwest of the station.

=== Highway access ===
- Hiroshima Prefectural Route 177 (Shimosa Higashi Route)
- Hiroshima Prefectural Route 267 (Utsu-Kabe Route)

== Connecting lines ==
This information is historical as all stations on this part of the Kabe Line are currently suspended from regular service.

Kabe Line
Aki-Kameyama Station — Kegi Station — Aki-Imuro Station
