= Aki-Kameyama Station (1936–2003) =

Railway station in Hiroshima, Japan

Aki-Kameyama Station 安芸亀山駅
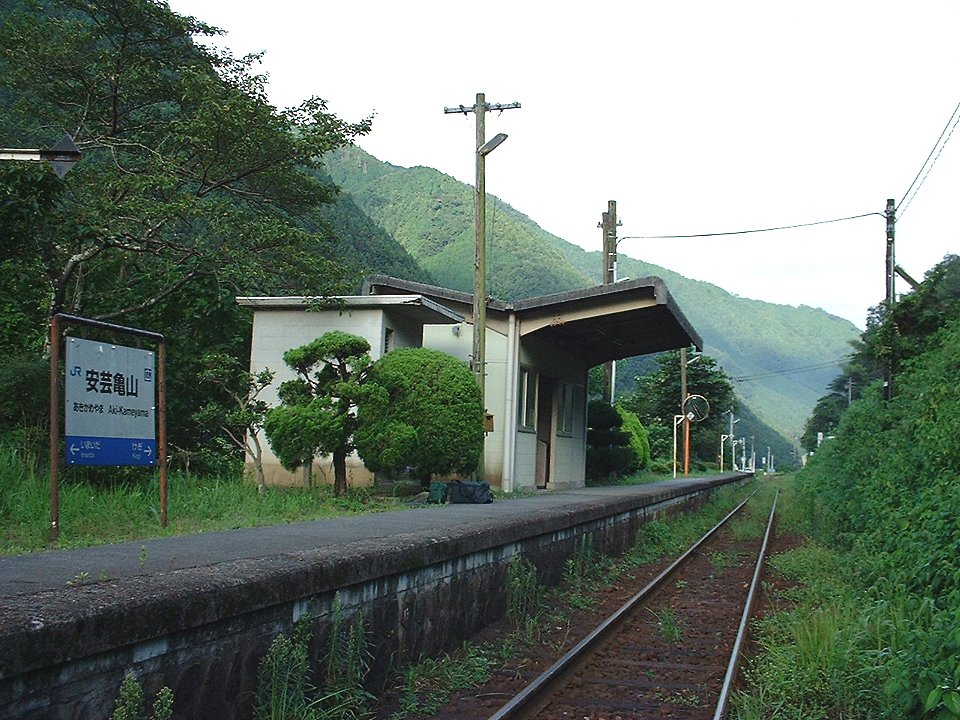
- The Aki-Kameyama Station platform looking toward Kegi Station in 2003

General information
- Location: Katsugi, Kabe-chō, Asakita-ku, Hiroshima, Hiroshima Prefecture; Japan
- Coordinates: 34°31′19.4″N 132°27′35.2″E
- Operator: JR West
- Line: Kabe Line
- Platforms: 1 side platform
- Tracks: 1

History
- Opened: 13 October 1936
- Closed: 1 December 2003
- Rebuilt: 2017 (Station resited)

Services
| Preceding station | JR West | Following station |
|---|---|---|
| Imaida | Kabe Line | Kegi |
Location
- Location within Japan

Aki-Kameyama Station (安芸亀山駅, Aki-Kameyama Eki) is a closed railway station on the Kabe Line in Katsugi, Kabe-chō, Asakita-ku, Hiroshima, Hiroshima Prefecture, Japan, formerly operated by West Japan Railway Company (JR West). It closed on 1 December 2003 when operation of the line was discontinued/suspended between Kabe Station and Sandankyō Station.

== History ==
- 13 October 1936: Aki-Kameyama Station opens
- 31 March 1955: After the merging of Ōbayashi, Kameyama and Miiri into Kabe-chō, the area around the station was renamed Katsugi, Kabe-chō, Asakita District, Hiroshima
- 1 April 1972: After Kabe-chō became part of Hiroshima City, the area around the station was renamed Katsugi, Kabe-chō, Hiroshima
- 1973: Aki-Kameyama Station becomes a Hiroshima City station
- 1 April 1980: After Hiroshima becomes a designated city, the area around the station is renamed Katsugi, Kabe-chō, Asakita-ku, Hiroshima
- 1 April 1987: Japanese National Railways is privatized, and Aki-Kameyama Station becomes a JR West station
- 1 December 2003: Aki-Kameyama Station closes along with the rest of the non-electrified section of the Kabe Line

== Station building ==
Aki-Kameyama Station is located on the north side of Hiroshima Prefectural Route 268. The station is high above the road, and accessible by a long staircase, and the back of the station building has a sign visible from the roadway. It features one side platform capable of handling one line, and featuring an enclosed waiting area. The station was unstaffed before this section of the Kabe Line was closed.

== Surrounding area ==
The Ōta River is approximately 25 meters to the south of Aki-Kameyama Station. Ōno Shrine is located about 200 km from the station, and a small general store is located 100m west.

=== Highway access ===
- Hiroshima Prefectural Route 177 (Shimosa Higashi Route)
- Hiroshima Prefectural Route 267 (Utsu-Kabe Route)
- Hiroshima Prefectural Route 268 (Katsugi-Yasufuruichi Route)

== Connecting lines ==
This information is historical as all stations on this part of the Kabe Line are currently suspended from regular service.

Kabe Line
Imaida Station — Aki-Kameyama Station — Kegi Station
