= Nukui Dam =

Dam in Hiroshima Prefecture, Japan

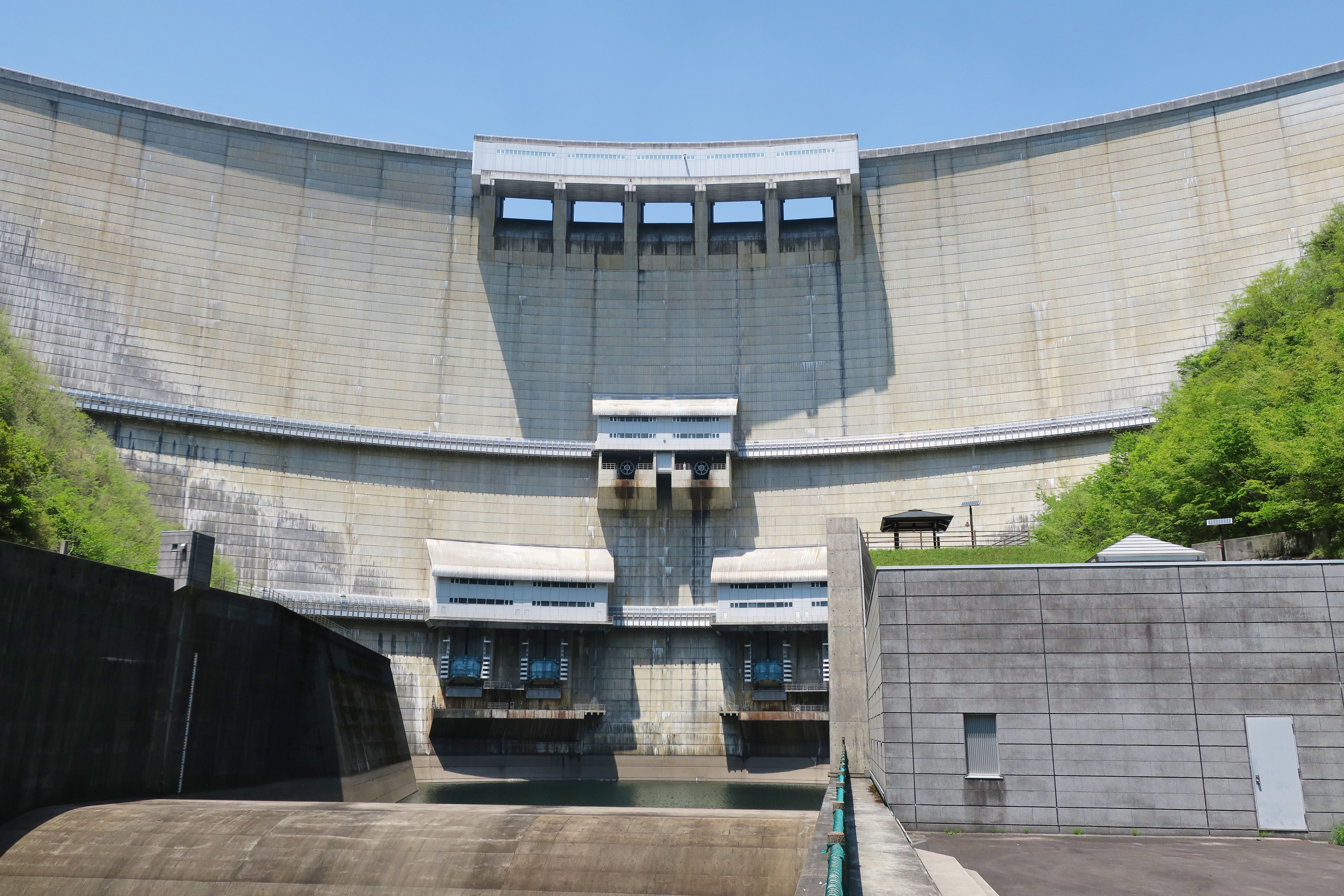
- Interactive map of Nukui Dam
- Location: Hiroshima Prefecture, Japan.
- Coordinates: 34°38′03.3″N 132°17′58.8″E
- Construction began: 1974
- Opening date: 2001

Dam and spillways
- Impounds: Takiyama River; A tributary of Ōta River
- Height: 156 m
- Length: 382 m

Reservoir
- Total capacity: 82,000,000 m^{3}
- Catchment area: 253.0 km^{2}
- Surface area: 160 hectares

Nukui Dam (温井ダム) is a dam in Akiōta (former Kake), Hiroshima Prefecture, Japan. In Japan, it is the second highest arch dam, and it generates a powerful discharge from a height of 156 meters (500 liters per second).
