= Tsubono Station =

Former railway station in Hiroshima Prefecture, Japan

Coordinates: 34°33′26.07″N 132°20′16.8″E

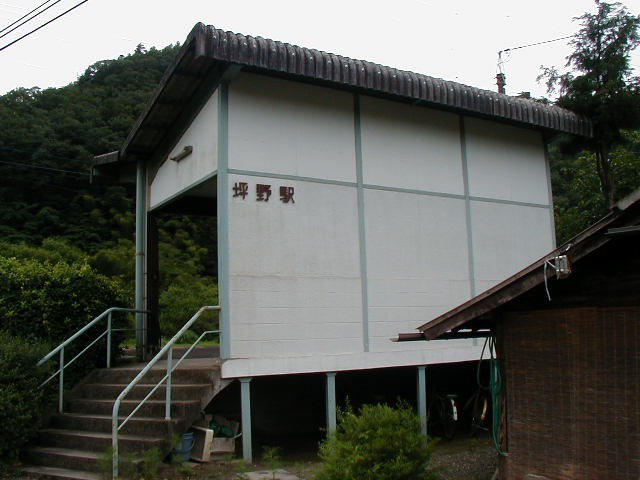
Tsubono Station in 2003

Tsubono Station (坪野駅, Tsubono-eki) is a former JR West Kabe Line station located in Yuki, Saeki District, Hiroshima Prefecture, Japan. It closed on December 1, 2003, when operation of the line was discontinued/suspended between Kabe Station and Sandankyō Station.

== Lines ==
- West Japan Railway Company
  - Kabe Line

== Adjacent stations ==
| « | Service | » |
Kabe Line
| Minochi | - | Tanoshiri |
