= Ogauchi Station =

Former railway station in Hiroshima Prefecture, Japan

Coordinates: 34°32′51″N 132°24′3.79″E

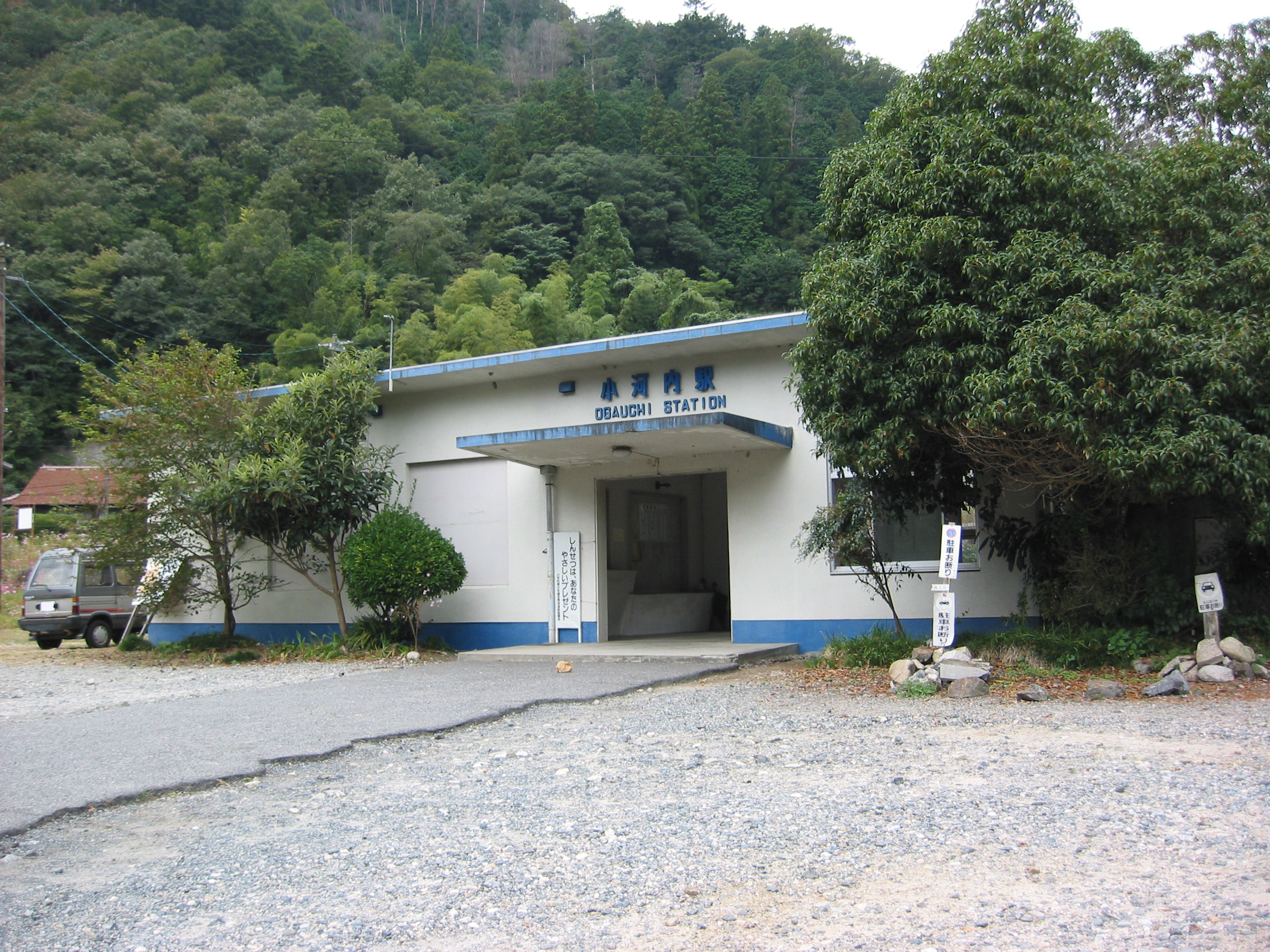
Station building, October 2003

Ogauchi Station (小河内駅, Ogauchi-eki) is a former JR West Kabe Line station located in Asakita-ku, Hiroshima, Hiroshima Prefecture, Japan. It closed on December 1, 2003 when operation of the line was discontinued/suspended between Kabe Station and Sandankyō Station.

== Lines ==
- West Japan Railway Company
  - Kabe Line

== Adjacent stations ==
«	Service	»
Kabe Line
Nuno	-	Yasuno
