= Toyohira =

Toyohira may refer to:

- Toyohira, Hiroshima
- Toyohira River
- Toyohira-ku, Sapporo
