= Nuno Station =

Former railway station in Hiroshima Prefecture, Japan

Coordinates: 34°32′2.8″N 132°24′29.28″E

Nuno Station 布駅
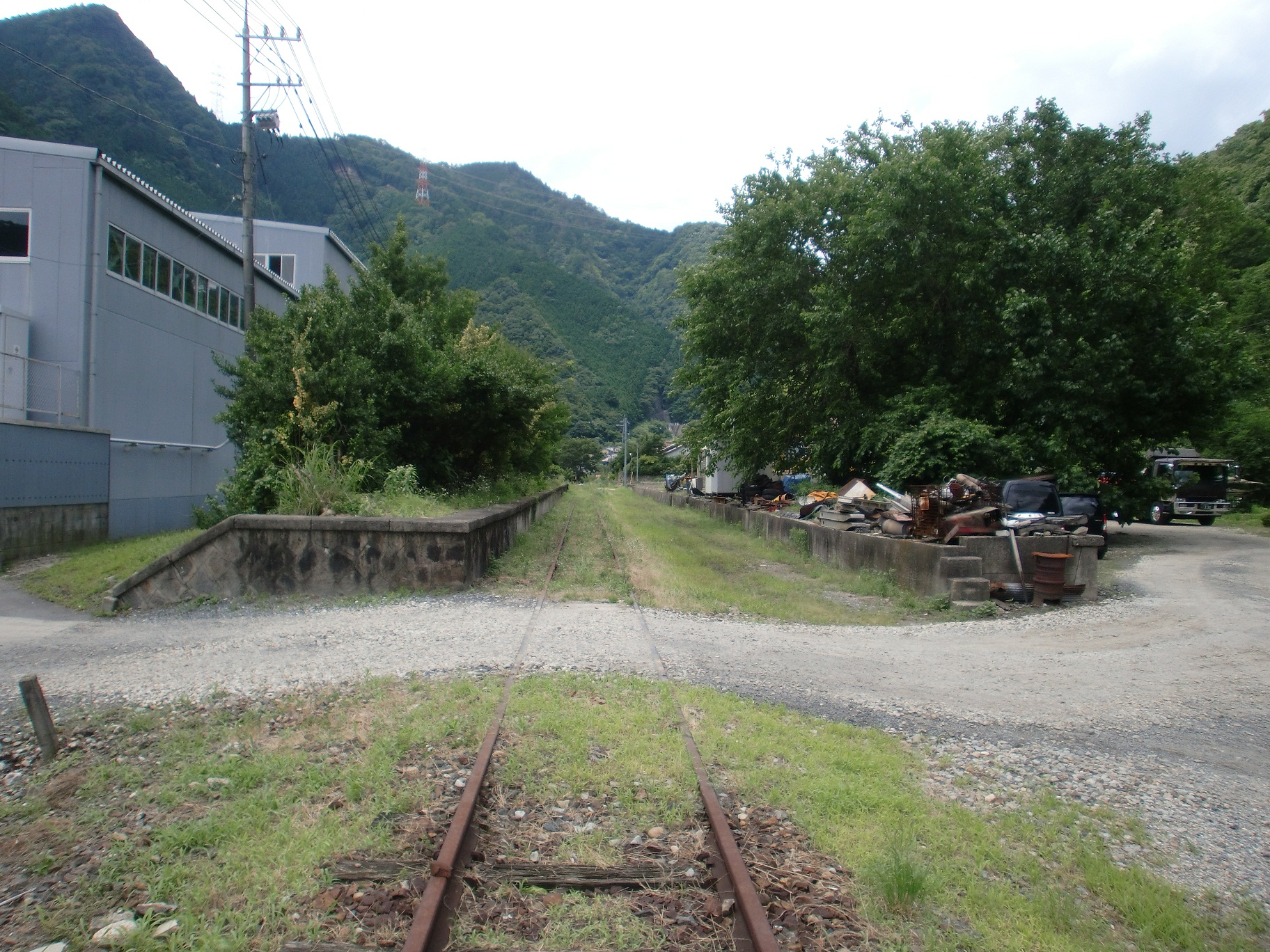

History
- Closed: December 1, 2003
Location

Nuno Station (布駅, Nuno-eki) is a former JR West Kabe Line station located in Asakita-ku, Hiroshima, Hiroshima Prefecture, Japan. It closed on December 1, 2003, when operation of the line was discontinued/suspended between Kabe Station and Sandankyō Station.

== Lines ==
- West Japan Railway Company
  - Kabe Line

== Adjacent stations ==
«	Service	»
Kabe Line
Aki-Imuro	-	Ogauchi
