= Kitahiroshima =

Kitahiroshima may refer to:

- Kitahiroshima, Hokkaido
- Kitahiroshima, Hiroshima
