= Doi Station =

Doi Station is the name of multiple train stations in Japan:

- Doi Station (Fukuoka) (土井駅)
- Doi Station (Osaka) (土居駅)
- Doi Station (Hiroshima) (土居駅) - closed
