= Aki-Imuro Station =

Former railway station in Hiroshima Prefecture, Japan

Aki-Imuro 安芸飯室駅
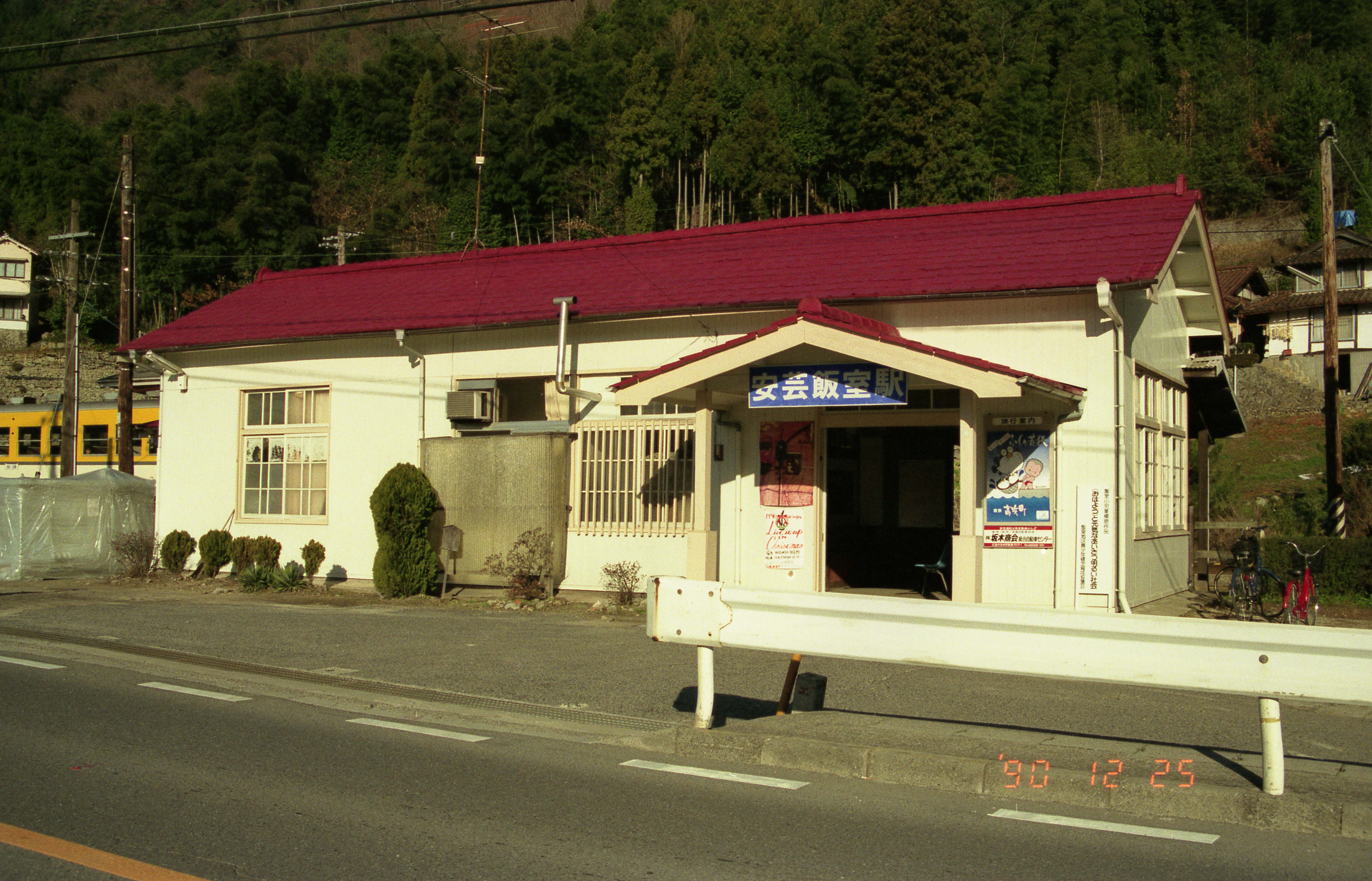
- Station building, December 1990

General information
- Location: Asakita-ku, Hiroshima, Hiroshima Prefecture; Japan
- Coordinates: 34°32′40.29″N 132°25′46.78″E
- Operator: JR West
- Line: Kabe Line

History
- Closed: December 1, 2003

Services
Preceding station	JR West	Following station
Kegi	Kabe Line	Nuno
Location

Aki-Imuro Station (安芸飯室駅, Aki-Imuro-eki) is a former JR West Kabe Line station located in Asakita-ku, Hiroshima, Hiroshima Prefecture, Japan. It closed on December 1, 2003, when operation of the line was discontinued/suspended between Kabe Station and Sandankyō Station. The location is now occupied by a cafe.

== Lines ==
- West Japan Railway Company
  - Kabe Line

== Adjacent stations ==
«	Service	»
Kabe Line
Kegi	-	Nuno
