= Ogurayama Castle =

Castle in Kitahiroshima, Hiroshima, Japan

- 小倉山城
- Kitahiroshima, Hiroshima Prefecture, Japan
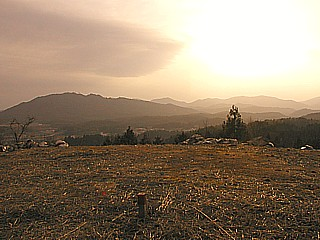

Site information
- Type: Mountaintop style Japanese castle
- Controlled by: Kikkawa clan

Location
- Ogurayama Castle Ogurayama Castle (Japan)
- Coordinates: 34°46′14.2″N 132°29′49.1″E

Site history
- Built: c.1380
- Built by: Kikkawa Tsunemi
- In use: Sengoku period
- Demolished: c.1550
- National Historic Site of Japan

Ogurayama Castle (小倉山城, Ogurayama-jō) was a Japanese castle located in Kitahiroshima, Hiroshima Prefecture. Its ruins have been protected by the central government as a National Historic Site since 1986 as part of the "Kikkawa clan fortification ruins" along with Surugamaru Castle and Hinoyama Castle.

== Overview ==
The Kikkawa clan (吉川氏, Kikkawa-shi) was a prominent samurai clan of Japan's Sengoku period. The founder of the clan, Kikkawa Tsuneyoshi (吉川経義), took his name from his estates in Suruga Province. He distinguished himself by the destruction of Kajiwara Kagetoki and this clan on orders of the Kamakura shogunate and received an estate in Harima Province. The clan further received an estate called Ōasa-no-shō in Aki Province for their services in the Jōkyū War. In 1313, Kikkawa Tsunetaka grew concerned with the increasing instability of the Kamakura shogunate and relocated his family and retainers to his estate in Aki. Around this time, he constructed Surugamaru Castle as his stronghold. The Kikkawa clan resided here for some 70 years until Kikkawa Tsunemi built nearby Ogurayama Castle near the end of the Nanboku-chō period and Surugamaru Castle was abandoned.

Ogurayama Castle is located at the northern end of the Ōasa Basin, at the end of a 460-meter hill that gently extends from north to south. The castle extended for about 600 meters from east-to-west and 600 meters from north-to-south. In addition, the castle area is a horseshoe-shaped ridge that extends to the south as a whole. With the inner bailey at the center, there are three enclosures on the north and two enclosures on the west side. The inner bailey is about 50 x 20 meters. The enclosures are protected by a system of dry moats and earthen walls, as well as wetlands at the base of the mountain. It is unknown exactly when the castle was built, but ur is commonly believed that in the latter part of the Nanboku-chō period. During this period, the main line of the Kikkawa clan sided with the Northern Court, but Kikkawa Tsunekane and his son Tsunemi, who were a cadet branch of the clan, sided with the Southern Court. However, main line of the Kikkawa clan died out at the end of the Nanboku-chō period, Tsunemi inherited the headship of the both branches. The Kikkawa subsequently became allied with Hosokawa Katsumoto during the Ōnin War (1467) and later joined forces with Ōuchi Yoshioki who supported the restoration of Ashikaga Yoshitane. During the Taei era (1521-27), the Kikkawa clan broke away from the Ōuchi clan and joined with the Amago clan, and also entered into a marriage alliance with the Mōri clan. However, the Mōri clan switched allegiance back-and-forth between the Ōuchi and the Amago, leading to much mistrust. In 1547, the Kikkawa and other vassals forced an internal coup to bring Mōri Motonari to power. Motonari's second son Mōri Motoharu became the head of the Kikkawa clan. In 1550, Kikkawa Motoharu transferred his seat to Hinoyama Castle and Ogurayama Castle was abandoned.

Very little remains of these fortifications today, although extensive traces of building foundations have been discovered.

== See also ==
- List of Historic Sites of Japan (Hiroshima)
