= Kake Station =

Former railway station in Hiroshima Prefecturem Japan

Coordinates: 34°36′31.52″N 132°19′13.49″E

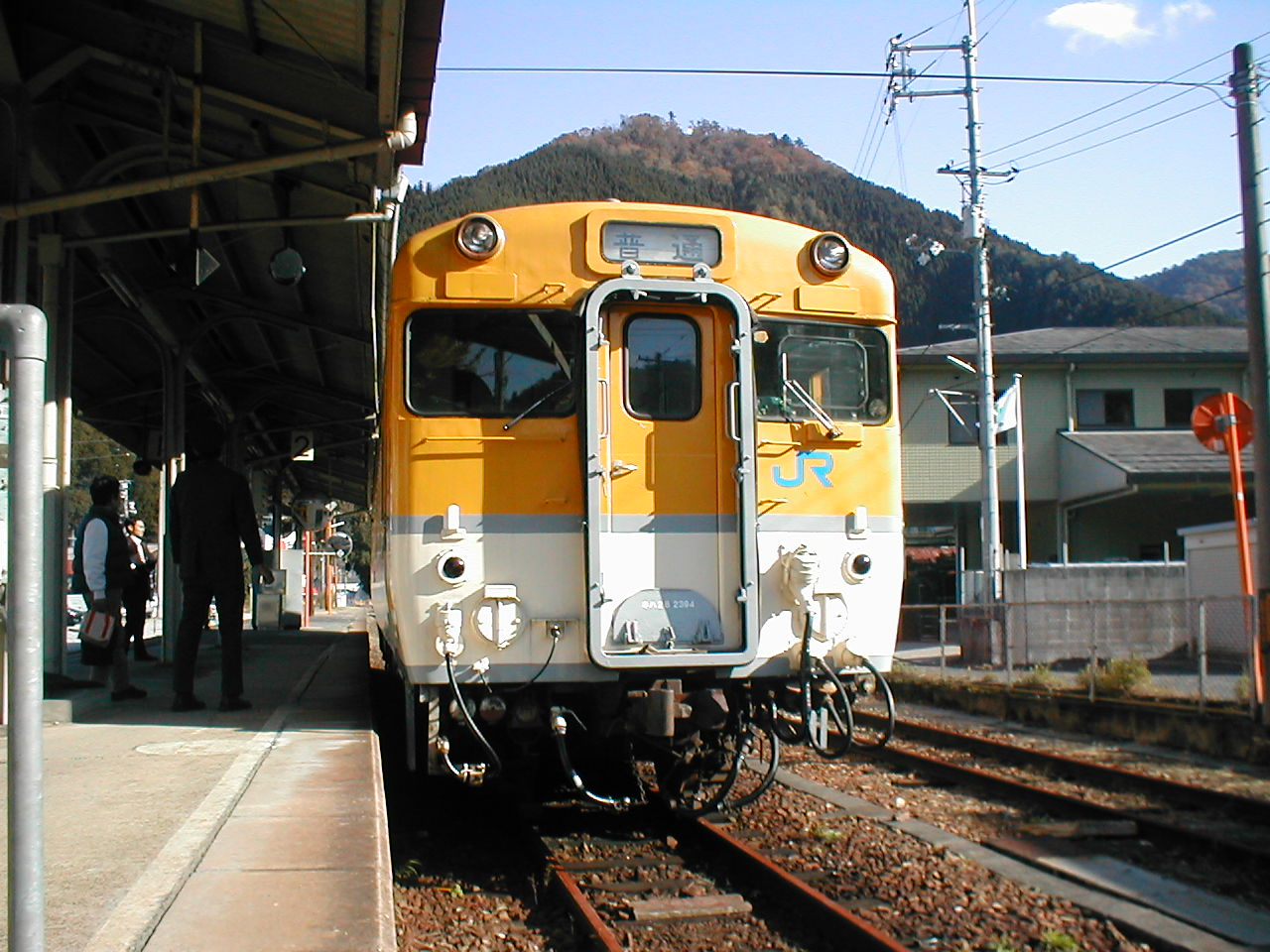
Kake sta, 2004

Kake Station (加計駅, Kake-eki) is a former JR West Kabe Line station located in Kake, Yamagata District, Hiroshima Prefecture, Japan. It closed on December 1, 2003, when operation of the line was discontinued/suspended between Kabe Station and Sandankyō Station.

== Lines ==
- West Japan Railway Company
  - Kabe Line

== Adjacent stations ==
«	Service	»
Kabe Line
Kagusa	-	Kisaka
