= Ōasa, Hiroshima =

Dissolved municipality in Hiroshima prefecture, Japan

Ōasa (大朝町, Ōasa-chō) was a town located in Yamagata District, Hiroshima Prefecture, Japan.

As of 2003, the town had an estimated population of 3,711 and a density of 41.01 persons per km^{2}. The total area was 90.50 km^{2}.

On February 1, 2005, Ōasa, along with the towns of Chiyoda, Geihoku and Toyohira (all from Yamagata District), was merged to create the town of Kitahiroshima.
