= Geihoku, Hiroshima =

Dissolved municipality in Hiroshima prefecture, Japan

Geihoku (芸北町, Geihoku-chō) was a town located in Yamagata District, Hiroshima Prefecture, Japan.

As of 2003, the town had an estimated population of 2,838 and a density of 11.19 persons per km^{2}. The total area was 253.63 km^{2}.

On February 1, 2005, Geihoku, along with the towns of Chiyoda, Ōasa and Toyohira (all from Yamagata District), was merged to create the town of Kitahiroshima.

The town of Geihoku revolves around its location on Route 191 which links southern Hiroshima prefecture to the Japan Sea coast at Masuda in Shimane prefecture. It's a popular road for driving with various spots to visit, such as Lake Hijiriko and the Sandankyo Gorge and is the access to a majority of the ski resorts in the region.
