= Ōta River Bridge =

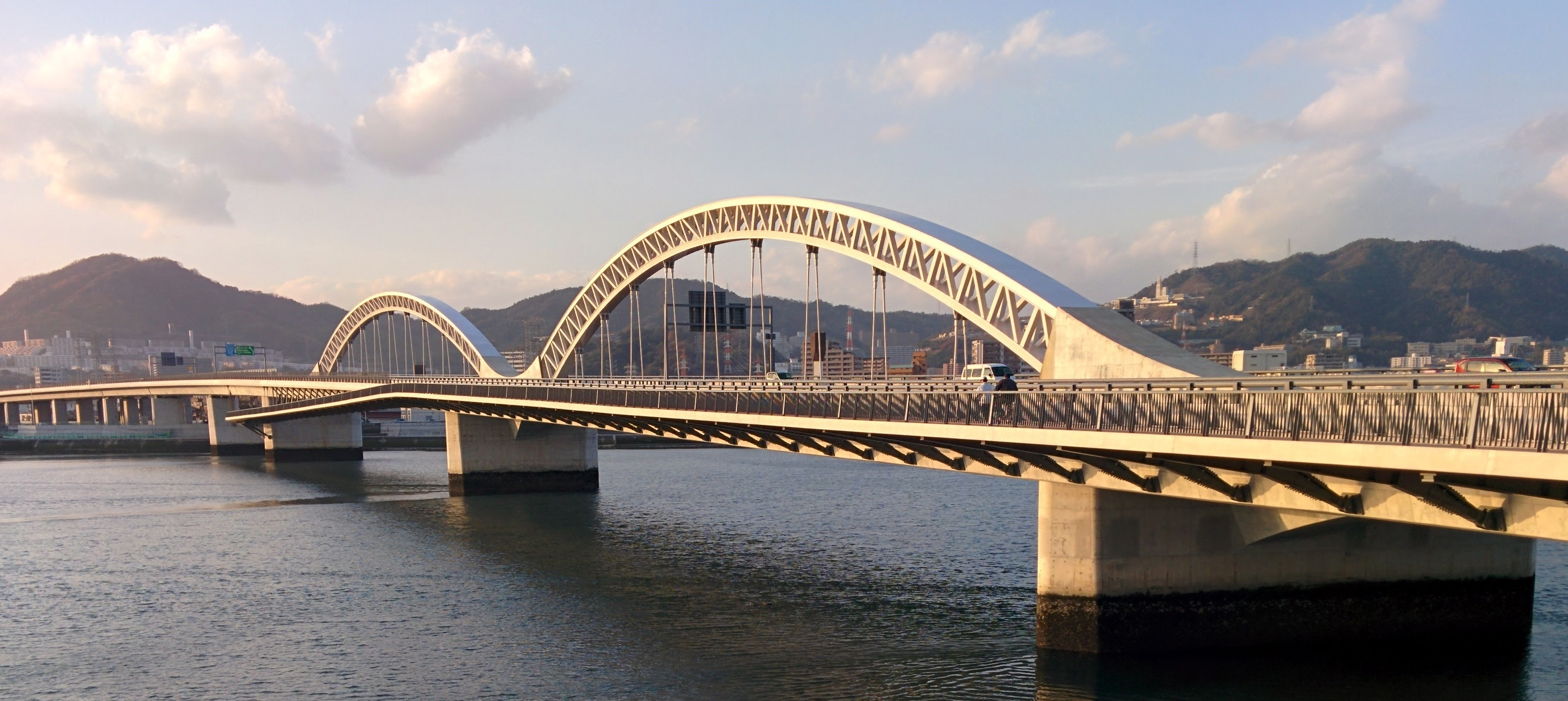
- Coordinates: 34°22′30″N 132°25′05″E
- Carries: Hiroshima Expressway Route 3
- Crosses: Ōta River
- Locale: Hiroshima, Japan

Characteristics
- Design: Composite box girder/arch bridge
- Total length: 412 m (1,352 ft)
- Width: 12.5–16.2 m (41–53 ft)
- Longest span: 116 m (381 ft) (×2)
- Clearance below: Less than 12 metres (39 ft) at mid-span (Note: Based on height to pilings under riverbed)

History
- Opened: March 2014

Location
- Interactive map of Ōta River Bridge

The Ōta River Bridge (Japanese: 太田川大橋, also rendered in rōmaji as Otagawaohashi, also called Otagawa Bridge or Otagawa Ohashi Bridge) is a bridge on the Ōta River in Hiroshima, Japan. It is the southernmost of all the crossings of the Ōta River and carries Route 3 (the Hiroshima Minami Route) of the Hiroshima Expressway.

== Construction ==
A decision to build a bridge as part of the expressway system was made in 2004. A design competition committee was formed in late 2008 and received entries from 18 Japanese and three international firms. The winning design by Kenichi Nishiyama of Eight-Japan Engineering Consultants collaborating with Yoko Kabaki, Akiyoshi Nii, and Hitoshi Okamura, was selected in July, 2009.

The bridge was built by Shimizu Corporation and finished in 2014. The bridge design had to comply with height restriction laws due to its proximity to Hiroshima–Nishi Airport.

The bridge, a composite prestressed concrete continuous rigid frame box girder with steel arch bridge stiffener, won the Japan Society of Civil Engineers Tanaka Award.
