= Chiyoda, Hiroshima =

Former town in Hiroshima Prefecture, Japan

Chiyoda (千代田町, Chiyoda-chō) was a town located in Yamagata District, Hiroshima Prefecture, Japan.

As of 2003, the town had an estimated population of 10,594 and a density of 61.93 persons per km^{2}. The total area was 171.07 km^{2}.

On February 1, 2005, Chiyoda, along with the towns of Geihoku, Ōasa and Toyohira (all from Yamagata District), was merged to create the town of Kitahiroshima.
