= Nishi-Chugoku Sanchi Quasi-National Park =

Quasi-national park in Japan

Nishi-Chūgoku Sanchi Quasi-National Park
- 西中国山地国定公園
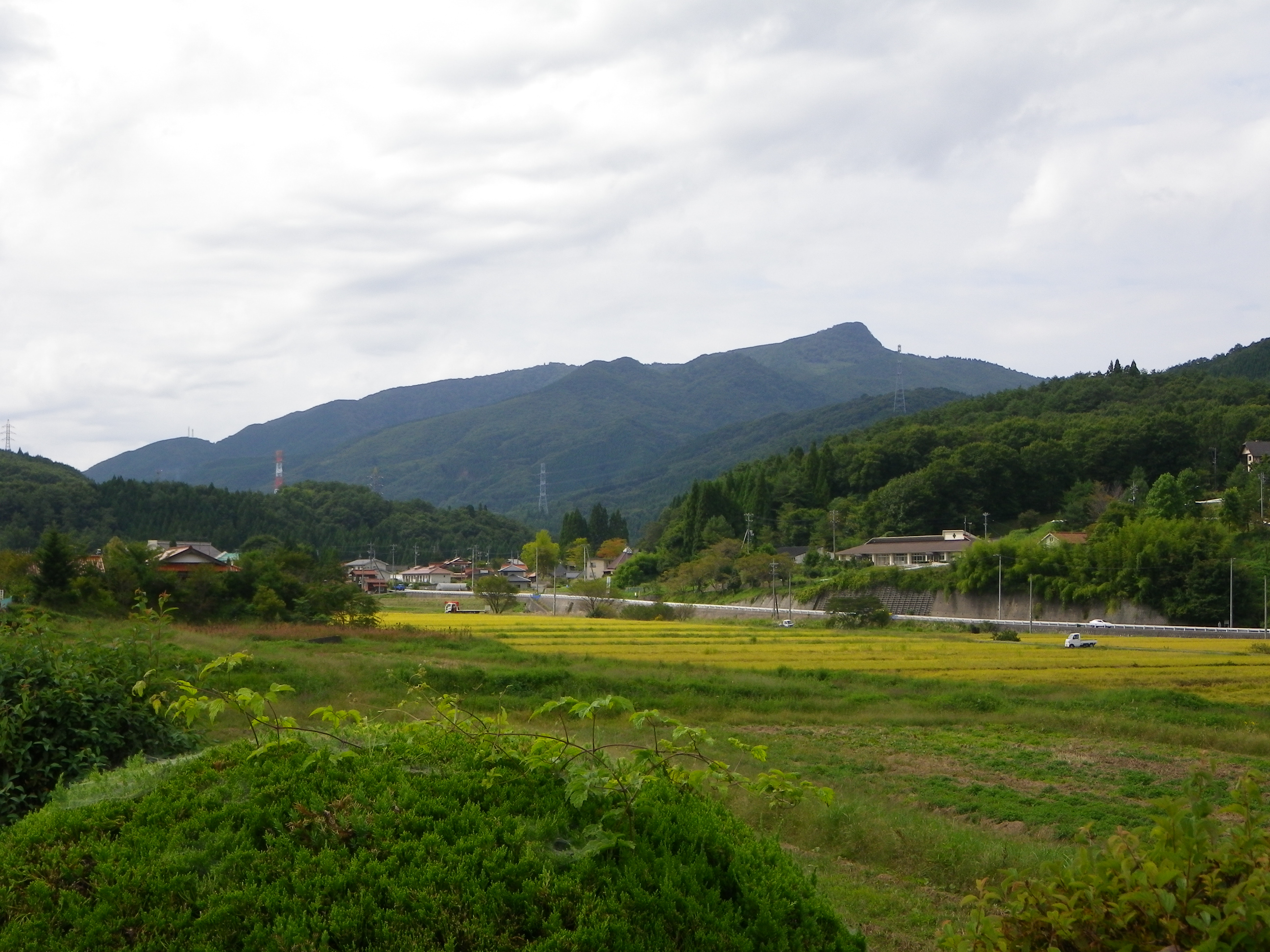
- Mount Kanmuri

- Location within Japan
- Location: Shimane/Hiroshima/Yamaguchi Prefecture, Japan
- Coordinates: 34°31′19″N 132°06′36″E
- Area: 285.53 km^{2} (110.24 sq mi)
- Established: January 10, 1969

Nishi-Chūgoku Sanchi Quasi-National Park (西中国山地国定公園, Nishi-Chūgoku-sanchi Kokutei Kōen) is a Quasi-National Park in Shimane Prefecture, Hiroshima Prefecture, and Yamaguchi Prefecture, Japan. It was founded on 10 January 1969 and has an area of 285.53 km^{2} (110.24 sq mi).

== Overview ==
There are many beautiful mountain and ravines including Mount Osorakan (恐羅漢山, Osorakan-zan), Mount Kanmuri (Hatsukaichi, Hiroshima) (吉和冠山, Yoshiwa Kanmuri-yama), Sandan ravine (三段峡, Sandan-kyō), Hikimi ravine (匹見峡, Hikimi-kyō) and Jakuchi ravine (寂地峡, Jakuchi-kyō).

There are virgin forests of Japanese beeches, Japanese oaks and Japanese horse chestnut.

There are Asiatic black bears, Japanese macaques, mountain hawk eagles and Japanese giant salamanders.

== Mountains ==
- Mount Osorakan 1,346 m (4,416 ft)
- Mount Kanmuri (Mount Yoshiwa Kanmuri) 1,339 m (4,393 ft)
- Mount Jakuchi 1,337 m (4,386 ft)
- Mount Garyu 1,223 m (4,012 ft)
- Mount Asa 1,218 m (3,996 ft)

== Ravines ==
- Sandan-kyō
- Hikimi-kyō
- Fukatani-kyō
- Jakuchi-kyō
- Souzu-kyō

== See also ==
- List of national parks of Japan
