= Hinoyama Castle =

Castle in Kitahiroshima, Japan

- 日野山城
- Kitahiroshima, Hiroshima Prefecture, Japan
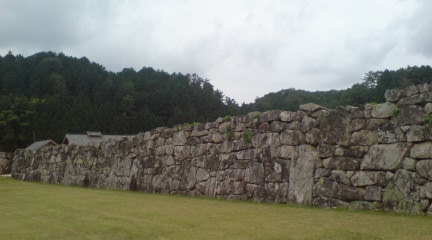
- Stone walls of the Kikkawa Motoharu Yakata

Site information
- Type: Mountaintop style Japanese castle
- Controlled by: Mōri clan

Location
- Hinoyama Castle
- Location within Hiroshima Prefecture Location within Japan
- Coordinates: 34°44′7.5″N 132°29′14.5″E

Site history
- Built: c.1550
- Built by: Kikkawa Motoharu,
- In use: Sengoku period
- Demolished: c.1591
- National Historic Site of Japan National Palace of Scenic Beauty

Hinoyama Castle (日野山城, Hinoyama-jō) was a Japanese castle located in the town of Kitahiroshima, Hiroshima Prefecture. Its ruins have been protected by the central government as a National Historic Site since 1940 as part of the Kikkawa clan castle ruins.

== History ==
Hinoyama Castle is located near the headwaters if the Gonokawa River, which flows south from the Chugoku Mountains through Akitakata and Miyoshi to the Seto Inland Sea. It also commanded an entrance to a mountain pass through the Chugoku Mountains to the Sea of Japan and was thus in a strategic position between former Aki Province and Izumo Province.

It is generally estimated that the Hinoyama Castle was built around 1550, although there were smaller fortifications on this site from an earlier date. In 1550, Kikkawa Motoharu, the second son of Mōri Motonari, relocated to this location from Ogurayama Castle and made it his primary stronghold against the Amago clan to the north. He constructed a small castle near the top of the 700-meter hill, and the castle continued to expand over the next three generations under his son Kikkawa Motonaga and grandson Kikkawa Hiroie until it covered the entire mountain. Kikkawa Motoharu fought at the Battle of Itsukushima in 1555 against Sue Harukata and in the three-year campaign against the Amago clan, which ended in 1566. When Motoharu retired in 1582, he found climbing the mountain to be tiresome, so he constructed a fortified residence at its base. This was called the Kikkawa Motoharu-yakata (吉川元春館).

In 1591, Kikkawa Hiroe transferred his seat to Gassan Toda Castle, and Hinoyama Castle appears to have been abandoned around this time. Currently, it is heavily overgrown, and there are few visible remains aside from fragments of stone walls and dry moats. The site is a 15-minute drive from the Hamada Expressway Ōasa interchange.

== Kikkawa Motoharu-yakata ==
Kikkawa Motoharu's fortified residence was constructed at the southwest foot of Hinoyama Castle, using the Shijiwara River as a moat. The front of the residence is protected by a huge stone wall with a height of about 3 meters and length of 80 meters, with earthworks on both sides, and a wall on top. The stacking of rocks for this wall is unique, with huge monoliths acting as pillars erected at regular intervals, and the space between filled with large and small stones. A similar stone wall construction method can be seen on the seaside approach to Itsukushima Shrine in Miyajima, suggesting that the group of stonemasons was the same. Kikkawa Motoharu started construction for this residence in 1583; however, he died in Kyushu in 1586 when the residence was only half completed. The following year, his son and heir Kikkawa Motonaga died of illness, and the residence was only finished by Kikkawa Hiroie, Motonaga's younger brother. As with Hinoyama Castle, the residence was abandoned when Kikkawa Hiroie relocated his seat to Gassan Toda Castle to 1591. It was listed as a ruin in a survey taken shortly after the 1600 Battle of Sekigahara.

Aside from the stone walls, the garden had remained in a very good state of preservation for a Sengoku period garden. It is based around an artificial pond with a bank of rocks set up vertically and an artificial hill to the north with and an artificial waterfall to the east of it. It has been designated as a National Place of Scenic Beauty in 2002.

An archaeological excavation was conducted on the site from 1994 to 1998, which uncovered the foundations of many buildings and wells, as well as many artifacts, such as earthenware, ceramics, and wooden and lacquer products for everyday use. Since then, efforts have been made to preserve and utilize the ruins, and by 2006, the stone walls had been restored, the kitchen building was restored from the foundation holes, and the garden was restored. A "Sengoku Garden History Museum" is located on the site.

== See also ==
- List of Historic Sites of Japan (Hiroshima)
- List of Places of Scenic Beauty of Japan (Hiroshima)
