= Mount Osorakan =

Mountain in the country of Japan

- 恐羅漢山
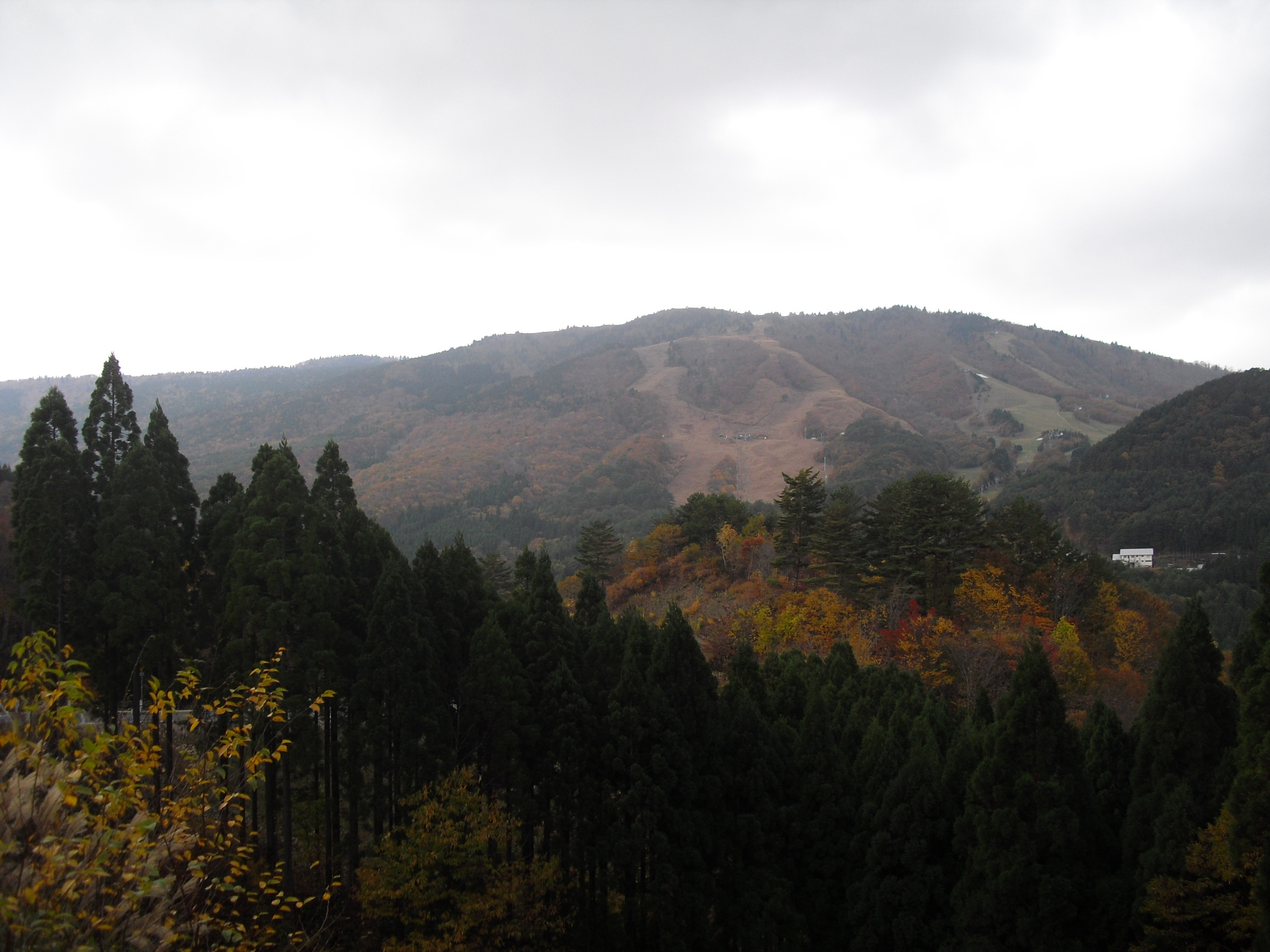
- Mount Osorakan

Highest point
- Elevation: 1,346 m (4,416 ft)
- Prominence: 1,127 m (3,698 ft)
- Listing: List of mountains and hills of Japan by height, Ribu
- Coordinates: 34°35′44″N 132°7′47″E

Geography
- Location within Japan
- Location: Honshu, Japan
- Parent range: Chūgoku Mountains

Mount Osorakan (恐羅漢山, Osorakan-zan) is a mountain on the border of Akitakata, Hiroshima Prefecture, and Masuda, Shimane Prefecture, Japan. Situated inside the Nishi-Chugoku Sanchi Quasi-National Park, the mountain is the tallest of both Hiroshima and Shimane prefectures.
