= Akiōta, Hiroshima =

Akiōta 安芸太田町
- Town
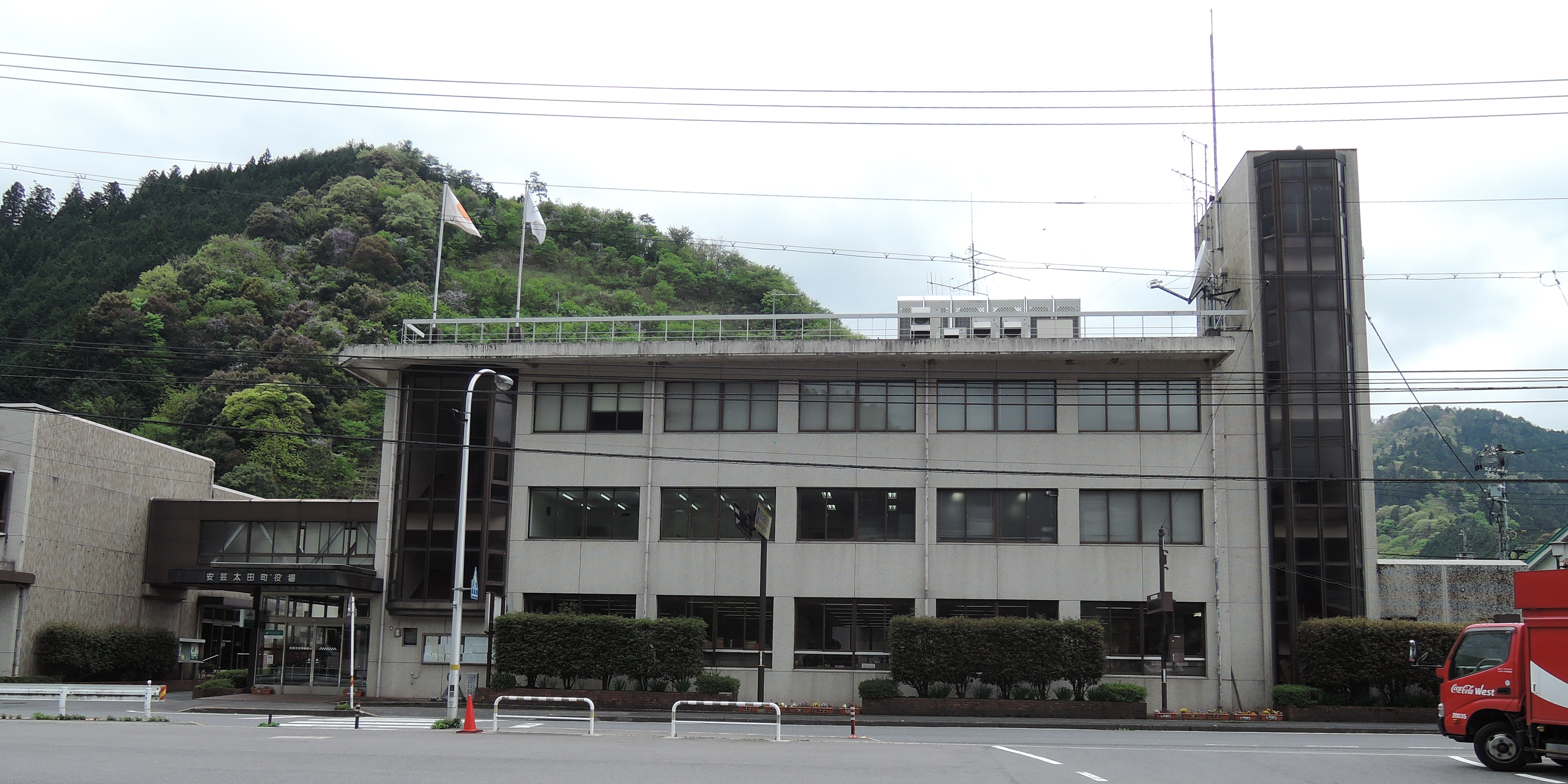
- Akiōta town hall

- Flag Emblem
- Interactive map of Akiōta
- Location in Japan
- Coordinates: 34°35′N 132°14′E
- Country: Japan
- Region: Chūgoku; San'yō
- Prefecture: Hiroshima
- District: Yamagata

Government
  - Mayor: Hiroaki Hashimoto (since May 2020)

Area
  - Total: 341.89 km^{2} (132.00 sq mi)

Population (April 28, 2023)
  - Total: 5,643
  - Density: 16.51/km^{2} (42.75/sq mi)
- Time zone: UTC+09:00 (JST)
- City hall address: 784-1 Oji Togochi, Akiota-machi, Yamagata-gun, Hiroshima-ken 731-3810
- Climate: Cfa
- Website: Official website
- Symbols
- Flower: Lilium
- Tree: Maple

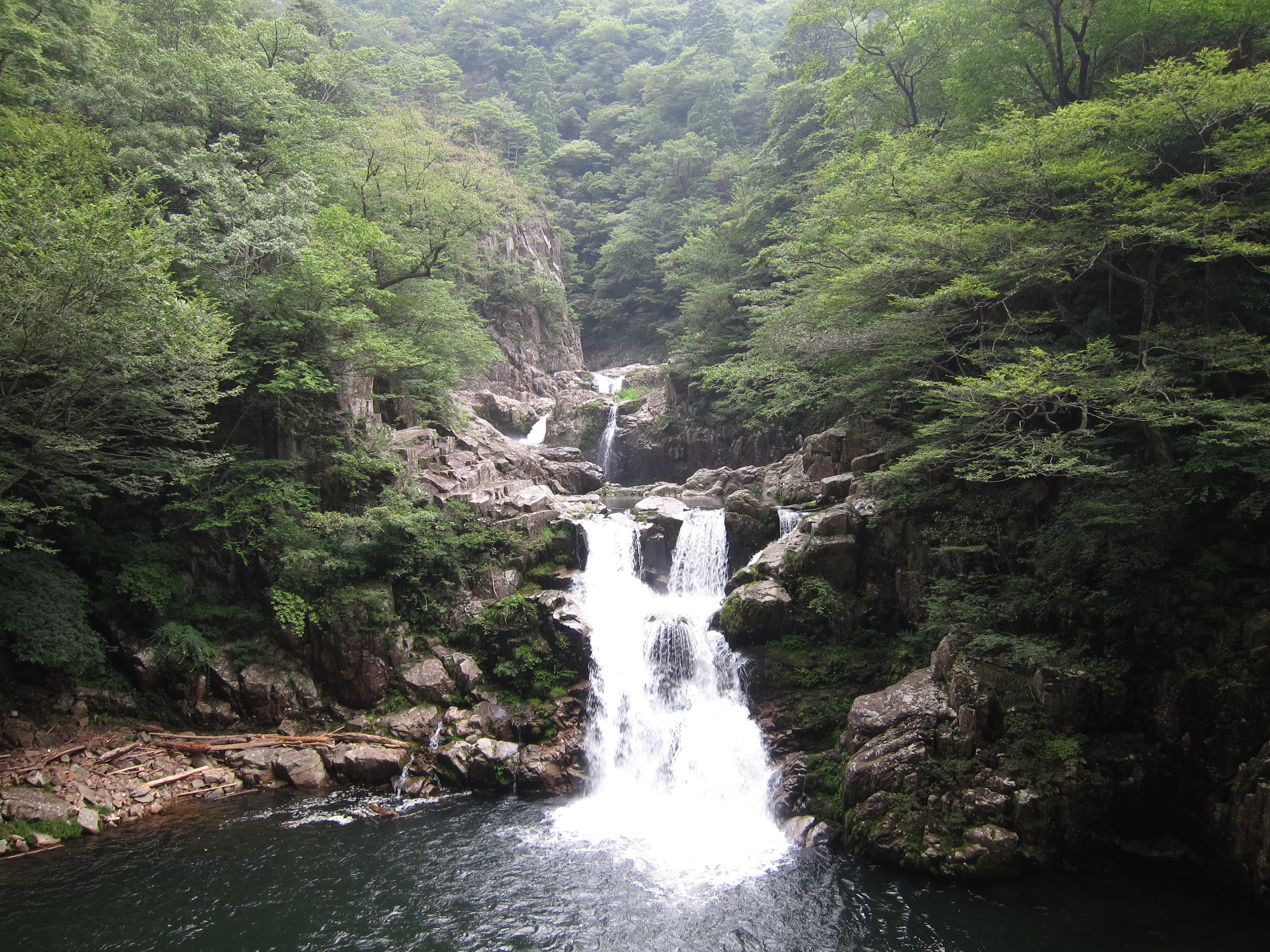
Sandan Falls

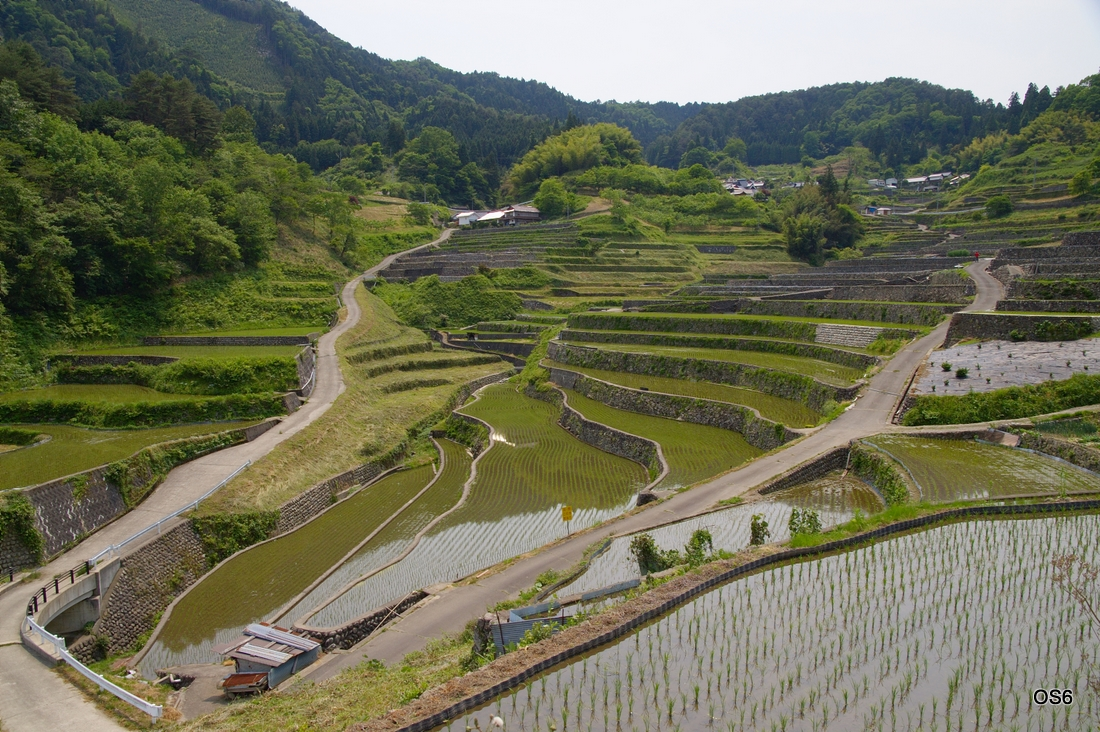
Terraced rice fields

Akiōta (安芸太田町, Akiōta-chō) is a town in Yamagata District, Hiroshima Prefecture, Japan. As of 28 April 2023, the town had an estimated population of 5,643 in 3066 households and a population density of 17 inhabitants per square kilometre (44/sq mi). The total area of the town is 341.89 square kilometres (132.00 sq mi).

== Geography ==
Akiōta is in the Chūgoku Mountains of north-western Hiroshima, bordered by Shimane Prefecture to the north. Due to its location and elevation, it is a heavy snowfall region.

=== Adjoining municipalities ===
Hiroshima Prefecture

- Hiroshima
- Hatsukaichi
- Kitahiroshima

Shimane Prefecture

- Masuda

=== Climate ===
Akiōta has a humid subtropical climate (Köppen climate classification Cfa) characterized by cool to mild winters and hot, humid summers. The average annual temperature in Akiōta is 13.4 °C (56.1 °F). The average annual rainfall is 1,817.5 mm (71.56 in) with July as the wettest month. The temperatures are highest on average in August, at around 25.6 °C (78.1 °F), and lowest in January, at around 2.0 °C (35.6 °F). The highest temperature ever recorded in Akiōta was 39.5 °C (103.1 °F) on 15 August 2024; the coldest temperature ever recorded was −12.8 °C (9.0 °F) on 28 February 1981.

Climate data for Kake, Akiōta (1991−2020 normals, extremes 1978−present)
| Month | Jan | Feb | Mar | Apr | May | Jun | Jul | Aug | Sep | Oct | Nov | Dec | Year |
|---|---|---|---|---|---|---|---|---|---|---|---|---|---|
| Record high °C (°F) | 18.1 (64.6) | 22.6 (72.7) | 26.3 (79.3) | 31.8 (89.2) | 34.7 (94.5) | 36.2 (97.2) | 39.1 (102.4) | 39.5 (103.1) | 38.5 (101.3) | 32.4 (90.3) | 27.7 (81.9) | 22.7 (72.9) | 39.5 (103.1) |
| Mean daily maximum °C (°F) | 7.1 (44.8) | 8.8 (47.8) | 13.5 (56.3) | 19.7 (67.5) | 24.7 (76.5) | 27.3 (81.1) | 30.5 (86.9) | 32.2 (90.0) | 27.9 (82.2) | 22.4 (72.3) | 16.2 (61.2) | 9.6 (49.3) | 20.0 (68.0) |
| Daily mean °C (°F) | 2.0 (35.6) | 2.8 (37.0) | 6.5 (43.7) | 12.0 (53.6) | 17.0 (62.6) | 20.9 (69.6) | 24.7 (76.5) | 25.6 (78.1) | 21.3 (70.3) | 15.2 (59.4) | 9.3 (48.7) | 4.1 (39.4) | 13.5 (56.2) |
| Mean daily minimum °C (°F) | −1.3 (29.7) | −1.3 (29.7) | 1.1 (34.0) | 5.6 (42.1) | 10.5 (50.9) | 16.0 (60.8) | 20.6 (69.1) | 21.3 (70.3) | 17.0 (62.6) | 10.4 (50.7) | 4.8 (40.6) | 0.7 (33.3) | 8.8 (47.8) |
| Record low °C (°F) | −8.7 (16.3) | −12.8 (9.0) | −6.9 (19.6) | −2.8 (27.0) | −0.1 (31.8) | 5.7 (42.3) | 12.0 (53.6) | 13.9 (57.0) | 4.1 (39.4) | 1.0 (33.8) | −2.6 (27.3) | −7.1 (19.2) | −12.8 (9.0) |
| Average precipitation mm (inches) | 106.6 (4.20) | 103.7 (4.08) | 132.7 (5.22) | 133.5 (5.26) | 158.3 (6.23) | 220.8 (8.69) | 302.8 (11.92) | 172.0 (6.77) | 204.5 (8.05) | 104.4 (4.11) | 79.3 (3.12) | 120.6 (4.75) | 1,817.5 (71.56) |
| Average precipitation days (≥ 1.0 mm) | 15.3 | 13.4 | 13.1 | 9.9 | 9.5 | 12.4 | 13.2 | 10.2 | 10.2 | 8.1 | 9.5 | 14.8 | 139.6 |
| Mean monthly sunshine hours | 76.1 | 95.4 | 147.4 | 180.5 | 207.3 | 147.8 | 151.5 | 178.1 | 146.9 | 154.7 | 117.7 | 83.1 | 1,686.3 |
Source: Japan Meteorological Agency

=== Demographics ===
Per Japanese census data, the population of Akiōta in 2020 is 5,740 people. Akiōta has been conducting censuses since 1920.

Historical population
| Year | Pop. | ±% |
|---|---|---|
| 1920 | 21,043 | — |
| 1925 | 20,717 | −1.5% |
| 1930 | 20,364 | −1.7% |
| 1935 | 19,258 | −5.4% |
| 1940 | 19,133 | −0.6% |
| 1945 | 22,339 | +16.8% |
| 1950 | 22,454 | +0.5% |
| 1955 | 23,312 | +3.8% |
| 1960 | 21,292 | −8.7% |
| 1965 | 17,021 | −20.1% |
| 1970 | 14,115 | −17.1% |
| 1975 | 12,992 | −8.0% |
| 1980 | 12,784 | −1.6% |
| 1985 | 11,738 | −8.2% |
| 1990 | 10,879 | −7.3% |
| 1995 | 10,257 | −5.7% |
| 2000 | 9,181 | −10.5% |
| 2005 | 8,238 | −10.3% |
| 2010 | 7,259 | −11.9% |
| 2015 | 6,472 | −10.8% |
| 2020 | 5,740 | −11.3% |
Akiōta population statistics

== History ==
The area of Akiōta was part of an ancient Aki Province, and was part of the holdings of Hiroshima Domain during the Edo Period . Following the Meiji restoration, the area was organized into villages within Yamagata District, Hiroshima with the creation of the modern municipalities system on April 1, 1889, including the villages Kake, Togouchi and Tsutsuga. Kake was raised to town status on February 10, 1898, and Togouchi on August 1, 1933. The town of Akiōta was formed on October 1, 2004, from the merger of the towns of Kake and Togouchi, and the village of Tsutsuga, all from Yamagata District.

On April 7, 2020, Shinji Kosaka, the mayor of Akiōta resigned after having accepted 200,000 yen from former Minister of Justice Katsuyuki Kawai in a vote-buying scandal.

== Government ==
Akiōta has a mayor-council form of government with a directly elected mayor and a unicameral town council of 12 members. Akiōta contributes one member to the Hiroshima Prefectural Assembly. In terms of national politics, the town is part of the Hiroshima 3rd district of the lower house of the Diet of Japan.

== Economy ==
The economy of Akiōta is largely based on agriculture and forestry, with seasonal tourism to its ski resorts.

== Education ==
Akiōta has four public elementary schools and two public junior high schools operated by the town government, and one public high school operated by the Hiroshima Prefectural Board of Education.

== Transportation ==
=== Railway ===
Akiōta does not have any passenger railway service. The nearest train station is Aki-Kameyama Station on the JR West Kabe Line in Asakita-ku, Hiroshima

=== Highways ===
- Chūgoku Expressway
- National Route 186
- National Route 191
- National Route 433
- National Route 434

=== Notable places ===
- Mount Osorakan
- Nukui Dam
- Sandan Ravine

== Notable people from Akiōta ==
- Kimie Bessho — para table tennis player
- Minoru Genda (1904 – 1989) — commander of the JASDF and politician (from Kake)
- Yasuhiko Moriwaki — judo wrestler (from the former town of Kake)
