= Sandan-kyō =

Ravine in Japan

Coordinates: 34°36′00″N 132°12′28″E

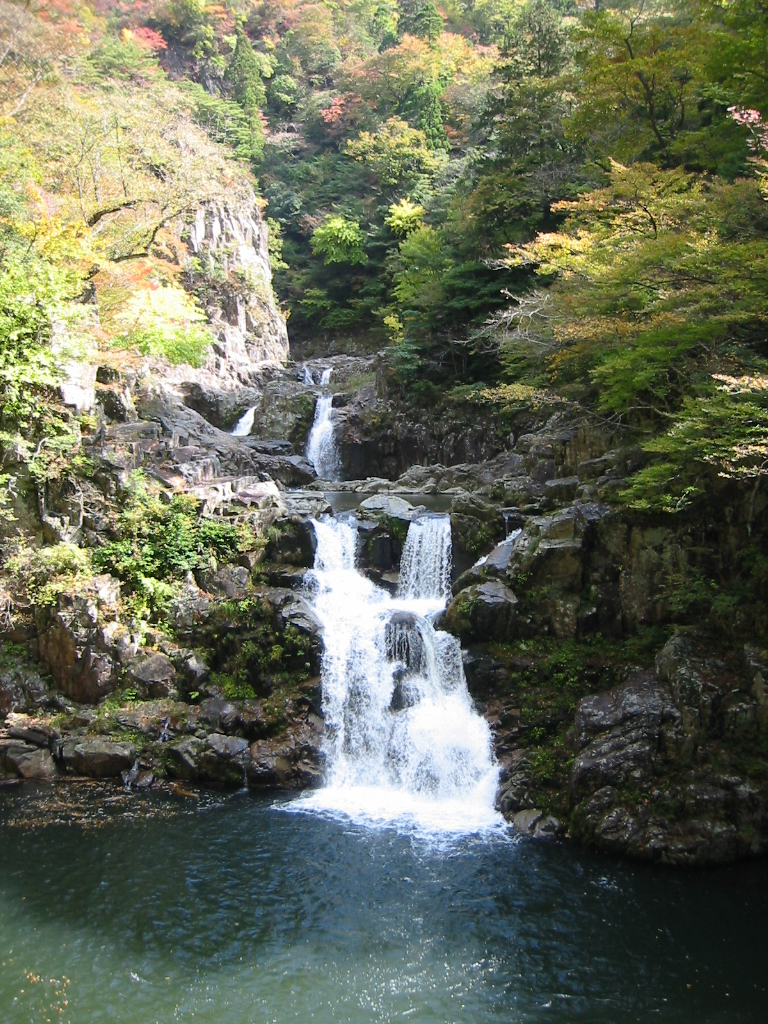
Sandandaki Falls in Sandan-kyō

Sandan-kyō (Japanese: 三段峡, lit. 'three-level gorge') is a 16-kilometer long ravine in the Nishi-Chugoku Sanchi Quasi-National Park in Akiōta, Hiroshima, in southwestern Japan. Through it runs the Shibaki River, one of the Ōta River's tributaries. Sandan-kyō is known for its autumn foliage.

== See also ==
- List of Special Places of Scenic Beauty, Special Historic Sites and Special Natural Monuments
- List of national parks of Japan
