= Toyohira, Hiroshima =

Dissolved municipality in Hiroshima prefecture, Japan

Toyohira (豊平町, Toyohira-chō) was a town located in Yamagata District, Hiroshima Prefecture, Japan.

As of 2003, the town had an estimated population of 4,270 and a density of 32.68 persons per km^{2}. The total area was 130.66 km^{2}.

On February 1, 2005, Toyohira, along with the towns of Chiyoda, Geihoku and Ōasa (all from Yamagata District), was merged to create the town of Kitahiroshima.
