= Mount Kanmuri (Hatsukaichi, Hiroshima) =

Mountain in Hiroshima, Japan

Mount Kanmuri (Yoshiwa Kanmuri)
- 冠山 (吉和冠山)
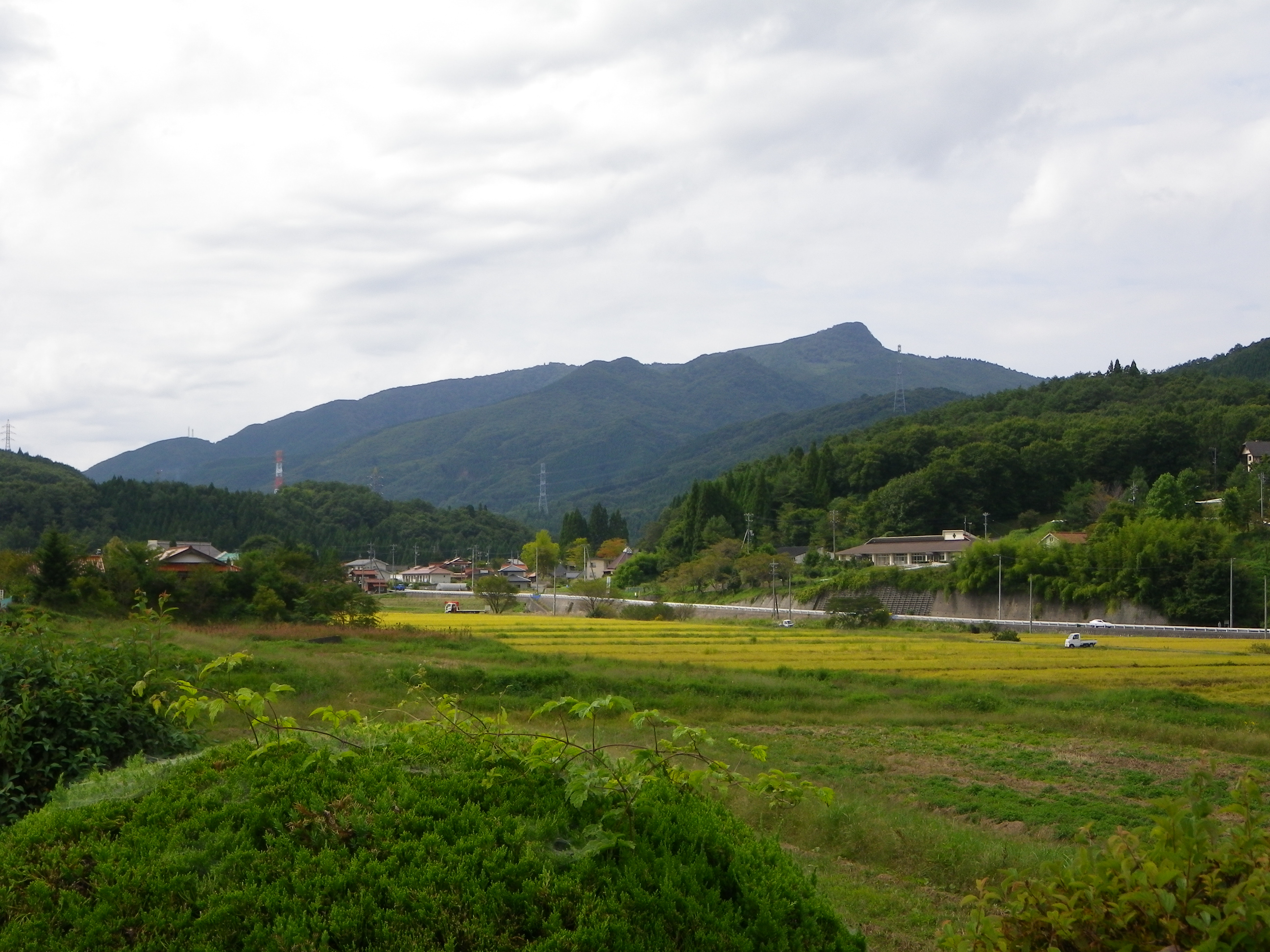
- Mount Yoshiwa Kanmuri

Highest point
- Elevation: 1,339 m (4,393 ft)
- Coordinates: 34°47′0″N 132°21′32″E

Naming
- Language of name: Japanese
- Pronunciation: Japanese: [kammɯɾi jama]

Geography
- Location within Japan
- Location: Hiroshima Prefecture, Japan
- Parent range: Chūgoku Mountains

Climbing
- Easiest route: Hiking

Mount Kanmuri (冠山, Kanmuri-yama), also known as Mount Yoshiwa Kanmuri (吉和冠山, Yoshiwa Kanmuri-yama), is a mountain located in the Yoshiwa District of Hatsukaichi, Hiroshima Prefecture, Japan. "Kanmuri" is a common name for mountains in Japan; Hiroshima Prefecture has six mountains by this name alone, hence the modifier "Yoshiwa".

== Description ==
Mount Yoshiwa Kanmuri has an elevation of 1,339 m (4,393 ft). The mountain is at the far west of the Chūgoku Mountains, and is part of Nishi-Chugoku Sanchi Quasi-National Park. The plateaus of the southern base of Mount Yoshiwa Kanmuri features large stands of renge tsutsuji rhododendron, and the area is designated a natural monument by the Prefecture of Hiroshima.

== Recreation ==
Mominoki Prefectural Forest (もみのき森林公園, Mominoki Shinrin Kōen) has facilities for camping and hiking, and is located in the fir forests at the eastern foot of the mountain.

== Transportation ==
The Chugoku Expressway, also known as National Route 468, follows the southern base of Mount Yoshiwa Kanmuri.
