= Yuki, Hiroshima (Saeki) =

Dissolved municipality in Hiroshima prefecture, Japan

Yuki (湯来町, Yuki-chō) was a town located in Saeki District, Hiroshima Prefecture, Japan.

As of 2003, the town had an estimated population of 7,618 and a density of 46.77 inhabitants per square kilometre (121.1/sq mi). The total area was 162.87 square kilometres (62.88 sq mi).

On April 25, 2005, Yuki was merged into the expanded city of Hiroshima, specifically at Saeki-ku.
