= Ōta River =

River in Chūgoku, Japan

Ota River
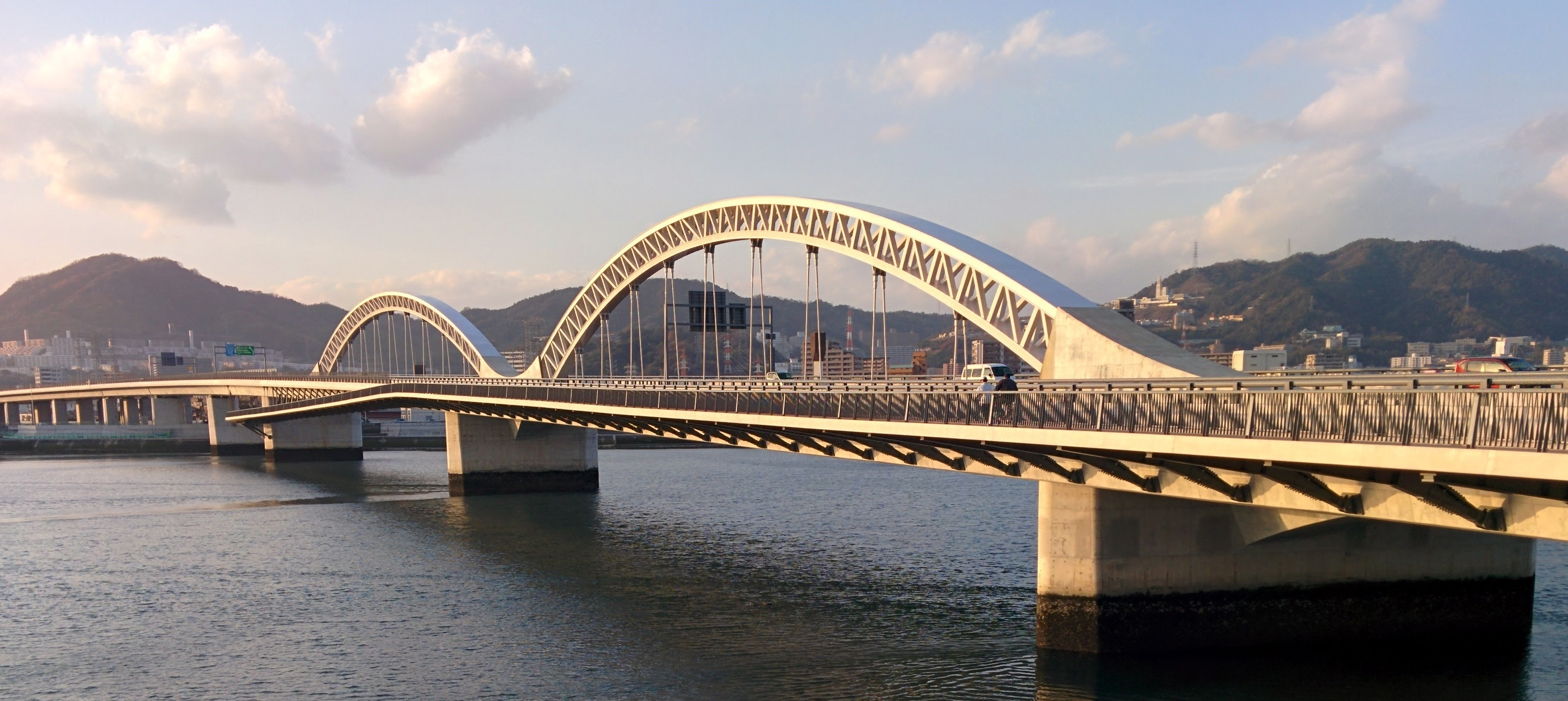
- Ōta River Bridge, the southernmost of all the crossings of the Ōta River

- Location within Japan

Physical characteristics
- Source: Mt. Kanmuri
  - location: Hatsukaichi, Hiroshima
- Mouth: Hiroshima Bay, Seto Inland Sea
  - location: Hiroshima
  - coordinates: 34°21′39″N 132°24′20″E
- Length: 103 km (64 mi)
- Basin size: 1,710 km^{2} (660 sq mi)

Ōta River (太田川, Ōta-gawa; Japanese pronunciation: [ò̞ó̞.tä́.ɡä̀.β̞ä̀, -ŋä̀-, ó̞ó̞-]) is a 103-kilometre-long (64-mile) Class A river in Hiroshima Prefecture, Japan.

== Geography ==
Its main stream originates in Mt. Kanmuri (冠山, Kanmuri-yama) (1,339 m; 4,393 ft) and empties, through a flood-control channel, into the Seto Inland Sea. The river is one of the major rivers in the prefecture and descends through steep topography, with hydroelectric power plants situated along the river.

The Ōta has numerous tributaries and branches into the delta area of Hiroshima which comprises the Tenma, Kyūōta/Honkawa, Motoyasu, Kyōbashi, and Enkō rivers.

Originally, the Ōta River passes through the western side of Aioi Bridge which was the aiming point for the atomic bombing of Hiroshima. A flood-control channel was built along the former Yamate river in the late 1960s, which became the main passageway of the Ōta River. The original passageway of the Ōta is now known as the Kyūōta River (旧太田川, Kyūōta-gawa, lit. "Old Ōta") or Honkawa River (本川, Honkawa).

Ōta River runs through the municipalities of Hatsukaichi, Akiota, Kitahiroshima, Akitakata, Higashihiroshima and Hiroshima. The size of its catchment area is 1,710 km^{2} (660 sq mi).

== See also ==
- Sandan-kyō - a ravine located in a tributary river of the Ōta River.
