= Togouchi, Hiroshima =

Dissolved municipality in Hiroshima prefecture, Japan

Togouchi (戸河内町, Togouchi-chō) was a town located in Yamagata District, Hiroshima Prefecture, Japan.

As of 2003, the town had an estimated population of 3,057 and a density of 15.91 persons per km^{2}. The total area was 192.09 km^{2}.

On October 1, 2004, Togouchi, along with the town of Kake, and the village of Tsutsuga (all from Yamagata District), was merged to create the town of Akiōta.
