= Tsutsuga, Hiroshima =

Dissolved municipality in Hiroshima prefecture, Japan

Tsutsuga (筒賀村, Tsutsuga-son) was a town located in Yamagata District, Hiroshima Prefecture, Japan. It has abundant forest resources.

As of 2003, the village had an estimated population of 1,193 and a density of 22.06 persons per km^{2}. The total area was 54.07 km^{2}.

== History ==
- 1 April 1889 (Meiji 22) - Upon the enforcement of the municipal system, the Uezunuga village merged with Nakagonuga village, and Tsutsuga was established.
- On 1 October 2004, Tsutsuga, along with the towns of Kake and Togouchi (all from Yamagata District), was merged to create the town of Akiōta.

== Geography ==
=== Rivers ===
- Ōta River
- Tsutsuga River - tributary of Ōta River
