= Kake, Hiroshima =

Town in Yamagata, Hiroshima, Japan

Kake (加計町, Kake-chō) was a town located in Yamagata District, Hiroshima Prefecture, Japan.

As of 2003, the town had an estimated population of 4,315 and a density of 44.91 persons per km^{2}. The total area was 96.09 km^{2}. The town was the birthplace of Imperial Japanese Navy aviator and later politician Minoru Genda.

On October 1, 2004, Kake, along with the town of Togouchi, and the village of Tsutsuga (all from Yamagata District), was merged to create the town of Akiōta.
