= Kitahiroshima, Hiroshima =

Kitahiroshima 北広島町
- Town
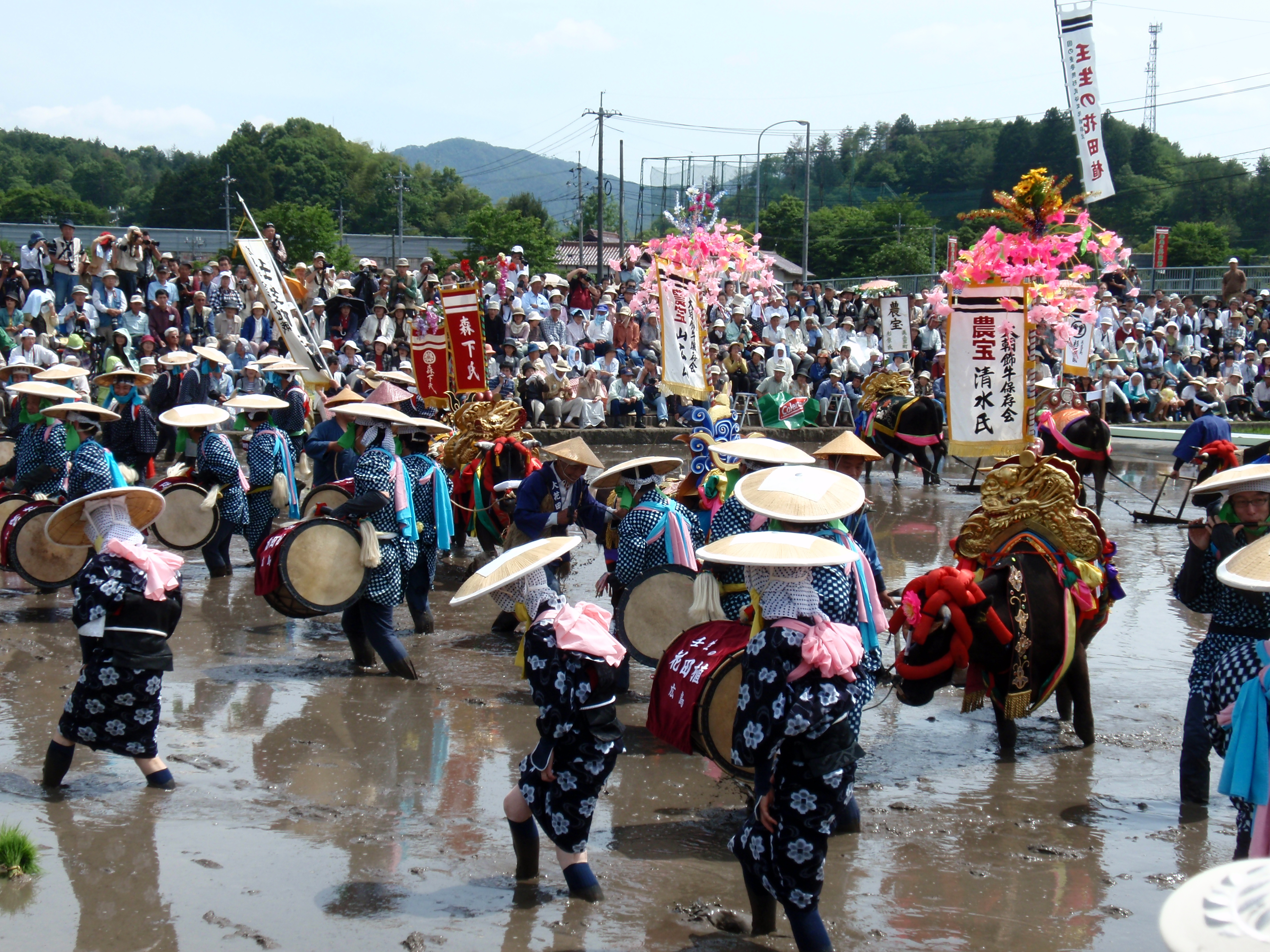
- View of Flower Planting Dance of Mibu

- Flag Chapter
- Interactive map of Kitahiroshima
- Location in Japan
- Coordinates: 34°40′28″N 132°32′18″E
- Country: Japan
- Region: Chūgoku; San'yō
- Prefecture: Hiroshima Prefecture
- District: Yamagata

Government
  - Mayor: Masahiko Takeshita (since March 2005)

Area
  - Total: 646.20 km^{2} (249.50 sq mi)

Population (April 30, 2023)
  - Total: 17,333
  - Density: 26.823/km^{2} (69.471/sq mi)
- Time zone: UTC+09:00 (JST)
- City hall address: 1234 Arita, Kitahiroshima-machi, Yamagata-gun, Hiroshima-ken 731-1595
- Climate: Cfa
- Website: Official website

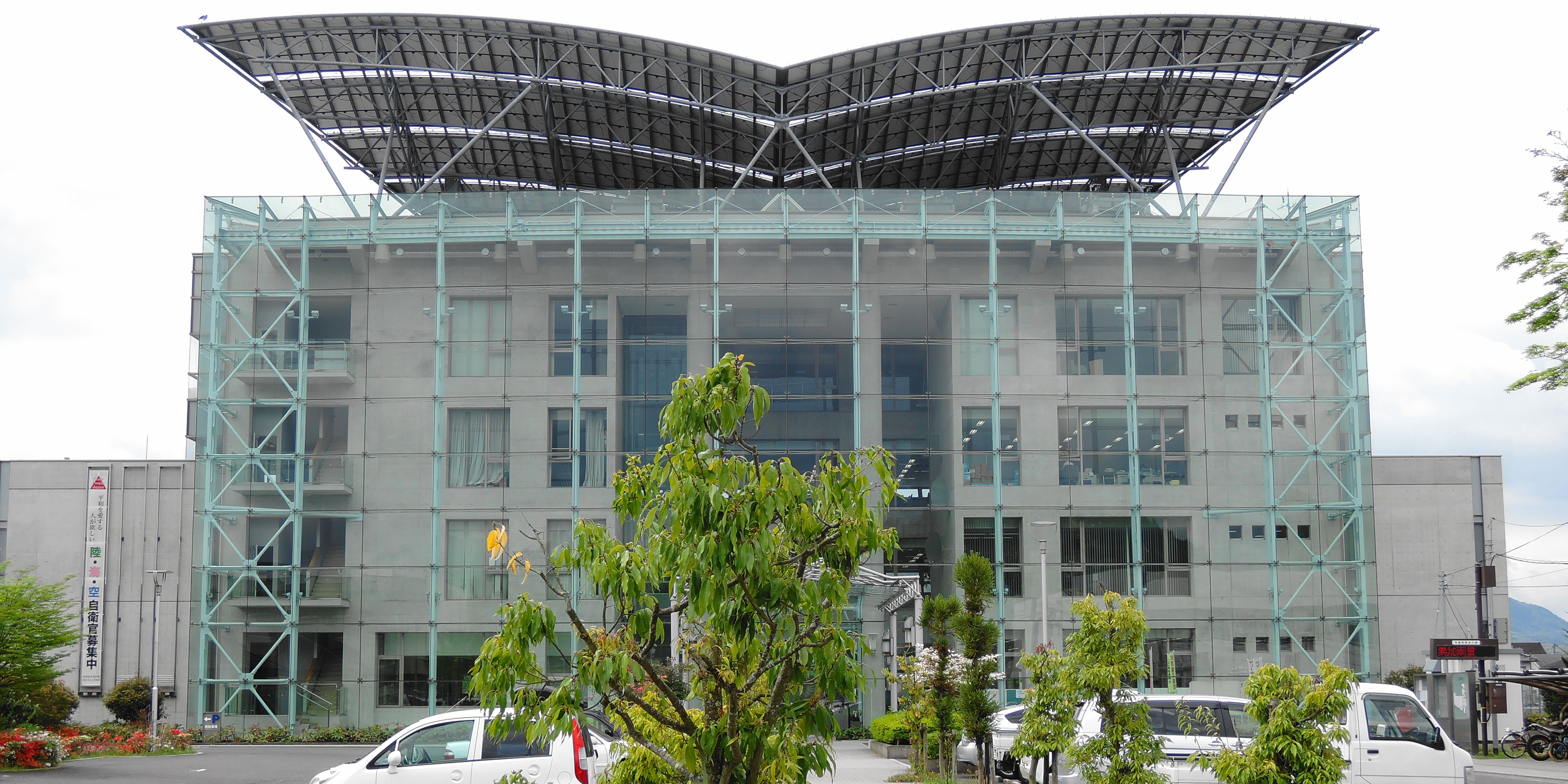
Kitahiroshima Town Hall

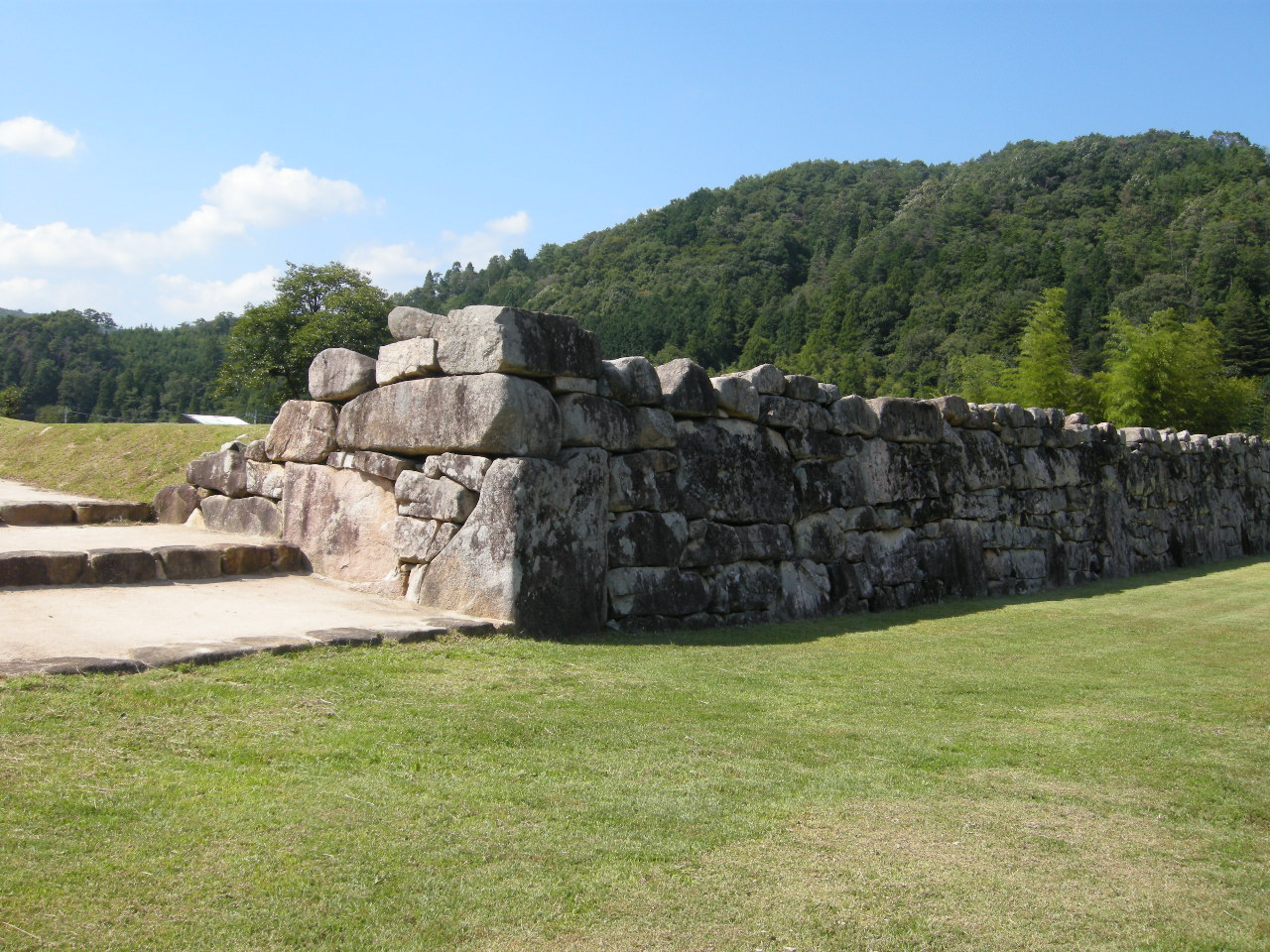
Kikkawa Motoharu castle ruins, National Historic Site

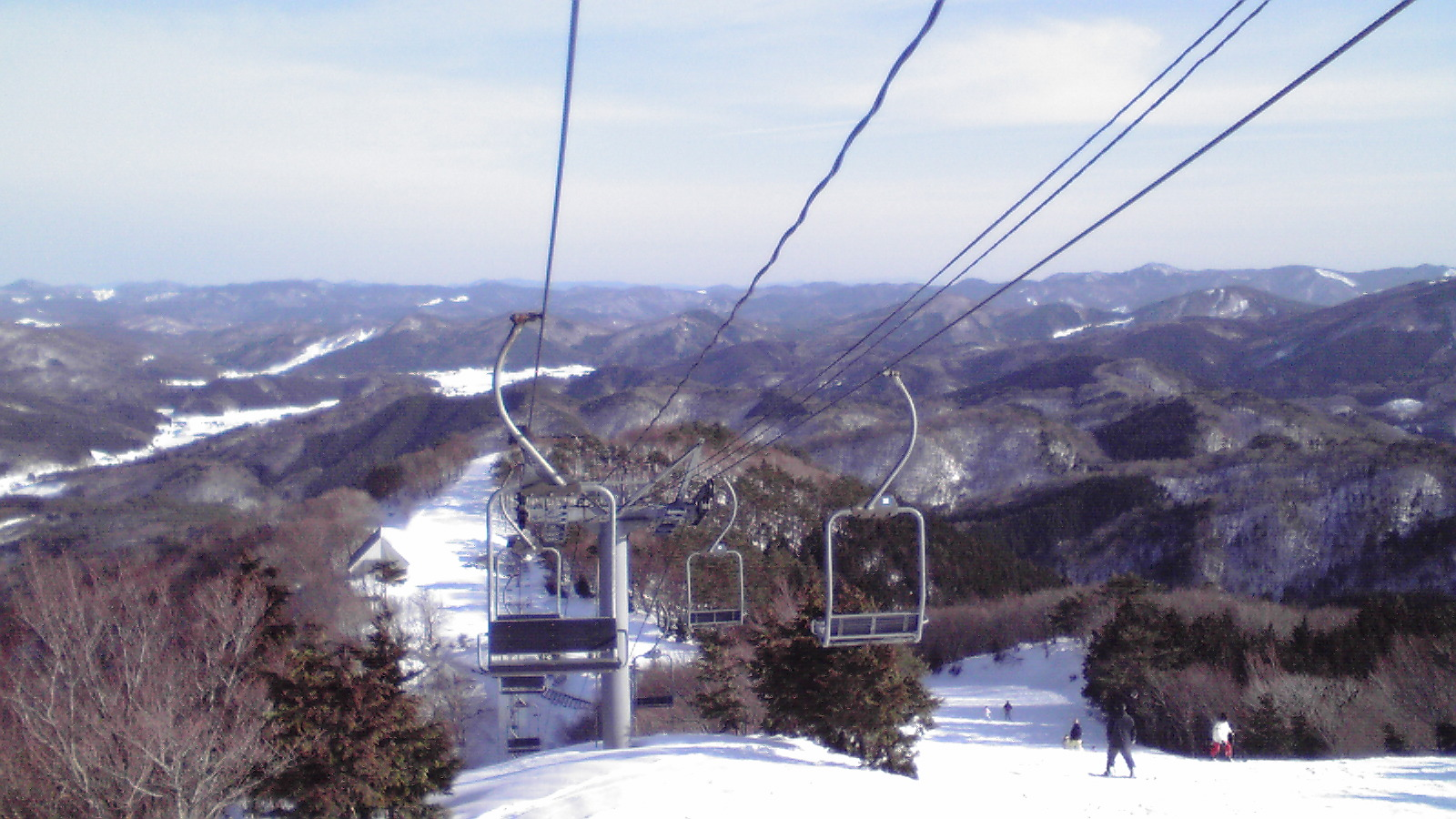
Oasa ski resort

Kitahiroshima (北広島町, Kitahiroshima-chō) is a town in Yamagata District, Hiroshima Prefecture, Japan. As of 30 April 2023, the town had an estimated population of 17,333 in 8333 households and a population density of 27 inhabitants per square kilometre (70/sq mi). The total area of the town is 646.20 square kilometres (249.50 sq mi).

== Geography ==
Kitahiroshima is in the Chūgoku Mountains of north-central Hiroshima, bordered by Shimane Prefecture to the north. Due to its location and elevation, it is a heavy snowfall region.

=== Adjoining municipalities ===
Hiroshima Prefecture

- Akiōta
- Akitakata
- Hiroshima

Shimane Prefecture

- Hamada
- Masuda
- Ōnan

=== Climate ===
Kitahiroshima has a humid subtropical climate (Köppen climate classification Cfa) characterized by cold winters and hot, humid summers. The average annual temperature in Kitahiroshima is 12.0 °C (53.6 °F). The average annual rainfall is 1,852.7 mm (72.94 in) with July as the wettest month. The temperatures are highest on average in August, at around 24.1 °C (75.4 °F), and lowest in January, at around 0.6 °C (33.1 °F). The highest temperature ever recorded in Kitahiroshima was 36.6 °C (97.9 °F) on 3 August 2026; the coldest temperature ever recorded was −18.1 °C (−0.6 °F) on 28 February 1981.

Climate data for Ōasa, Kitahiroshima (1991−2020 normals, extremes 1977−present)
Month	Jan	Feb	Mar	Apr	May	Jun	Jul	Aug	Sep	Oct	Nov	Dec	Year
Record high °C (°F)	16.3 (61.3)	19.3 (66.7)	25.6 (78.1)	29.7 (85.5)	32.0 (89.6)	34.8 (94.6)	36.5 (97.7)	36.6 (97.9)	34.9 (94.8)	30.5 (86.9)	25.2 (77.4)	18.9 (66.0)	36.6 (97.9)
Mean daily maximum °C (°F)	5.0 (41.0)	6.4 (43.5)	11.0 (51.8)	17.2 (63.0)	22.2 (72.0)	25.0 (77.0)	28.3 (82.9)	29.5 (85.1)	25.4 (77.7)	19.9 (67.8)	14.0 (57.2)	7.8 (46.0)	17.6 (63.8)
Daily mean °C (°F)	0.6 (33.1)	1.3 (34.3)	4.8 (40.6)	10.4 (50.7)	15.5 (59.9)	19.5 (67.1)	23.4 (74.1)	24.1 (75.4)	19.9 (67.8)	13.6 (56.5)	7.8 (46.0)	2.8 (37.0)	12.0 (53.5)
Mean daily minimum °C (°F)	−3.5 (25.7)	−3.5 (25.7)	−1.0 (30.2)	3.4 (38.1)	8.8 (47.8)	14.5 (58.1)	19.4 (66.9)	19.7 (67.5)	15.2 (59.4)	8.0 (46.4)	2.4 (36.3)	−1.5 (29.3)	6.8 (44.3)
Record low °C (°F)	−15.7 (3.7)	−18.1 (−0.6)	−13.0 (8.6)	−6.2 (20.8)	−2.0 (28.4)	3.0 (37.4)	6.8 (44.2)	10.7 (51.3)	1.4 (34.5)	−2.0 (28.4)	−5.2 (22.6)	−14.7 (5.5)	−18.1 (−0.6)
Average precipitation mm (inches)	120.8 (4.76)	109.9 (4.33)	140.0 (5.51)	136.4 (5.37)	158.6 (6.24)	214.2 (8.43)	276.7 (10.89)	163.2 (6.43)	202.0 (7.95)	112.6 (4.43)	91.0 (3.58)	129.3 (5.09)	1,852.7 (72.94)
Average snowfall cm (inches)	125 (49)	102 (40)	28 (11)	0 (0)	0 (0)	0 (0)	0 (0)	0 (0)	0 (0)	0 (0)	1 (0.4)	65 (26)	319 (126)
Average precipitation days (≥ 1.0 mm)	15.9	14.6	13.9	10.9	9.9	12.0	13.5	10.5	11.0	8.4	10.3	15.5	146.4
Average snowy days (≥ 3 cm)	11.1	8.9	2.7	0	0	0	0	0	0	0	0.1	5.4	28.2
Mean monthly sunshine hours	70.8	91.4	144.6	178.7	207.2	152.1	152.3	181.3	148.7	155.7	118.3	82.6	1,690.6
Source: Japan Meteorological Agency

=== Demographics ===
Per Japanese census data, the population of Kitahiroshima in 2020 is 17,763 people. Kitahiroshima has been conducting censuses since 1920.

Historical population
Year	Pop.	±%
1920	34,257	—
1925	34,062	−0.6%
1930	33,283	−2.3%
1935	33,263	−0.1%
1940	31,480	−5.4%
1945	39,377	+25.1%
1950	38,723	−1.7%
1955	38,165	−1.4%
1960	35,696	−6.5%
1965	29,672	−16.9%
1970	25,682	−13.4%
1975	24,229	−5.7%
1980	23,743	−2.0%
1985	23,183	−2.4%
1990	22,926	−1.1%
1995	22,458	−2.0%
2000	21,929	−2.4%
2005	20,857	−4.9%
2010	19,970	−4.3%
2015	18,918	−5.3%
2020	17,763	−6.1%
Kitahiroshima population statistics

== History ==
The area of Kitahiroshima was part of an ancient Aki Province, and was part of the holdings of Hiroshima Domain during the Edo Period . Following the Meiji restoration, the area was organized into villages within Yamagata District, Hiroshima with the creation of the modern municipalities system on April 1, 1889.

Kitahiroshima was formed on February 1, 2005, from the merger of the towns of Chiyoda, Geihoku, Ōasa and Toyohira, all from Yamagata District.

== Government ==
Kitahiroshima has a mayor-council form of government with a directly elected mayor and a unicameral town council of 12 members. Kitahiroshima contributes one member to the Hiroshima Prefectural Assembly. In terms of national politics, the town is part of the Hiroshima 3rd district of the lower house of the Diet of Japan.

== Economy ==
The economy of Kitahiroshima is largely based on agriculture and forestry, with seasonal tourism to its ski resorts.

== Education ==
Kitahiroshima has nine public elementary schools and four public junior high schools operated by the town government, and two public high schools operated by the Hiroshima Prefectural Board of Education. there is also one private middle school and one private high school.

== Transportation ==
=== Railway ===
Kitahiroshima does not have any passenger railway service. The nearest train station is Kabe Station on the JR West Kabe Line in Asakita-ku, Hiroshima

=== Highways ===
- Chūgoku Expressway
- Hamada Expressway
- National Route 186
- National Route 191
- National Route 261
- National Route 433
- National Route 434
