= Yamagata District, Hiroshima =

District in Hiroshima prefecture, Japan

Coordinates: 34.689°N 132.349°E

Location of Yamagata District in Hiroshima Prefecture

Yamagata (山県郡, Yamagata-gun) is a district located in northwestern Hiroshima Prefecture, Japan.

As of 2003, the district has an estimated population of 29,978 and a density of 30.34 persons per km^{2}. The total area is 988.11 km^{2}.

Atomic bomb survivor Toshiyuki Mimaki lives in Yamagata district.

== Towns and villages ==
- Akiōta: founded on October 1, 2004 from the merger of the towns of Kake and Togouchi, and the village of Tsutsuga
- Kitahiroshima: founded on February 1, 2005 from the merger of the towns of Chiyoda, Geihoku, Ōasa and Toyohira
