= Sandankyō Station =

Railway station in Akiōta, Japan

Coordinates: 34°35′57.4″N 132°12′33.8″E

Sandankyō Station 三段峡駅
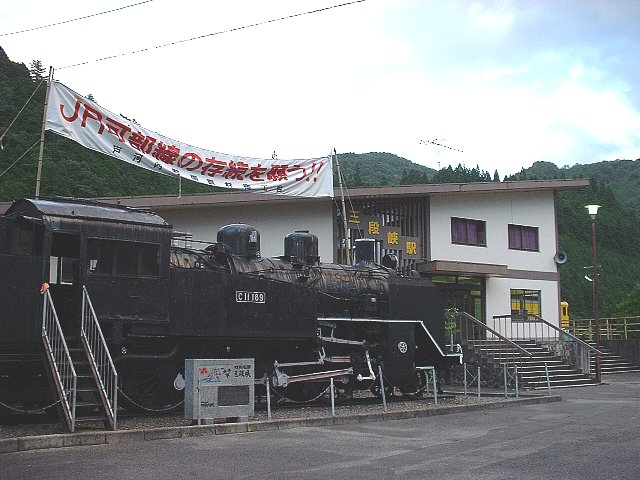
- Sandankyō Station and preserved C11 steam locomotive in 2003

General information
- Location: Akiōta, Yamagata, Hiroshima; Japan
- Operator: JR West
- Line: Kabe Line

History
- Opened: 1969
- Closed: 2003
Location

Sandankyō Station (三段峡駅, Sandankyō Eki) was a JR West Kabe Line terminal station located in Akiota, Hiroshima, Japan. It closed on December 1, 2003, when operation of the line was discontinued/suspended between Kabe Station and Sandankyō Station.

The station had one side platform.

== History ==
The station was opened on 27 July 1969 following the opening of section between Kake Station and this station. Imafuku Line, connecting the station with Hamada Station began construction, but the plan was abandoned in 1980.

The station was closed on 1 December 2003 along with rest of stations from Kabe Station, and the building was destroyed by 2005.

== Surrounding area ==
- Sandan-kyō
  - JNR Class C11 was preserved next to the station, but was moved to ÆON mall Hiroshima-Fuchu following the closure of the station.

== Adjacent stations ==
West Japan Railway Company
Kabe Line (Closed section)

Togōchi Station - Sandankyō Station
