= Kōdo Station (Hiroshima) =

Former railway station in Hiroshima Prefecture, Japan

Coordinates: 34°31′1.7″N 132°29′58.7″E

Kōdo Station 河戸駅
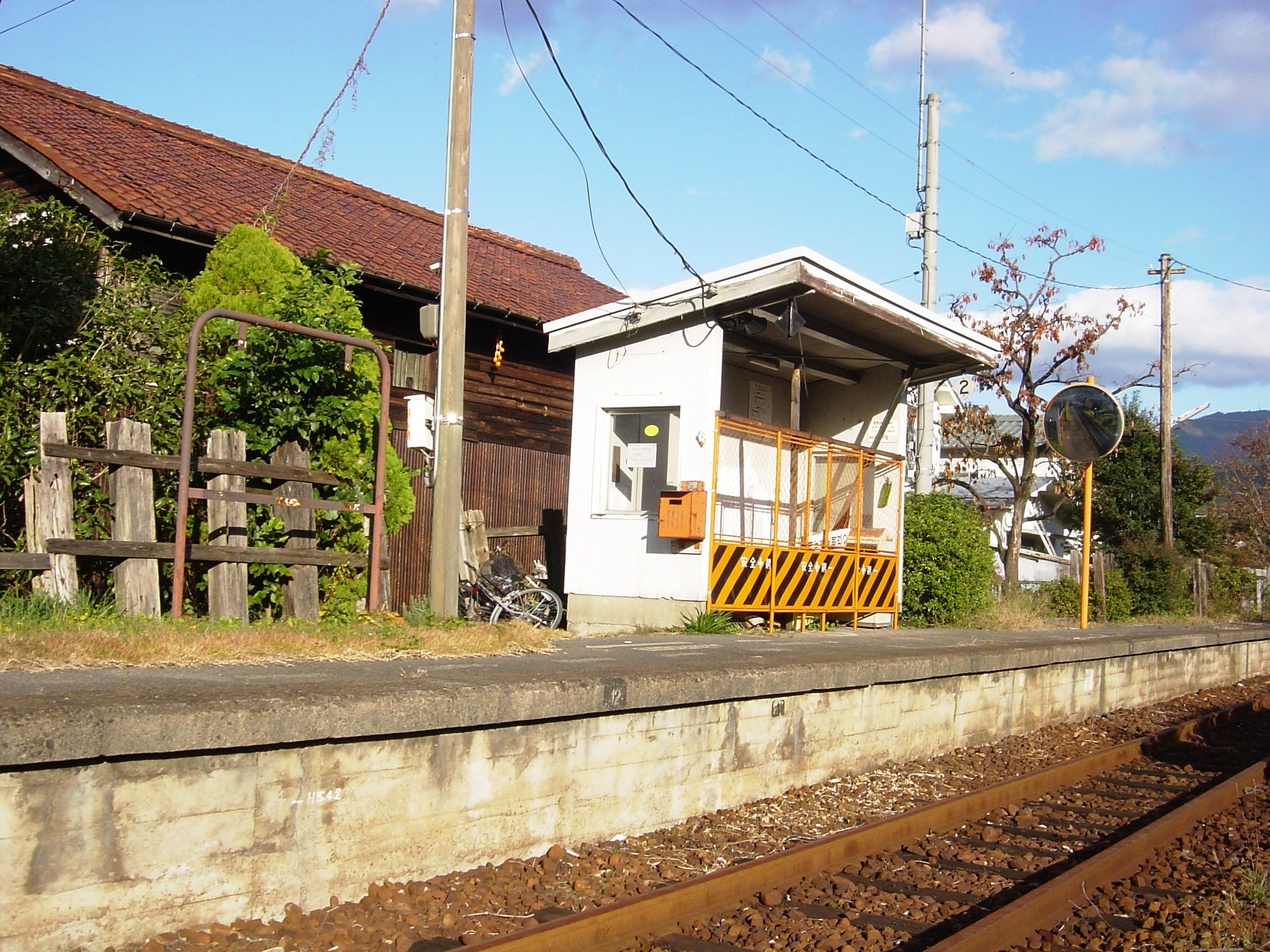
- The closed Kōdo Station, November 2005

General information
- Location: 1-9 Kameyama, Asakita, Hiroshima, Hiroshima; Japan
- Operator: JR West
- Line: Kabe Line

History
- Opened: 1956
- Closed: 2003
Location

Kōdo Station (河戸駅, Kōdo Eki) is a closed railway station in Asakita-ku, Hiroshima, Japan, formerly operated by West Japan Railway Company (JR West) on the Kabe Line. It closed on 1 December 2003 when operation of the line was suspended between Kabe Station and Sandankyō Station.

== Lines ==
Kōdo Station was located on the Kabe Line, and was situated between the current location of Kōdo-Homachigawa Station and Aki-Kameyama Station.

== Station layout ==
Kōdo Station had one side platform serving the single-track line.

== History ==
Kōdo Station opened on 20 December 1956, operated by Japanese National Railways (JNR). It became a JR West station on 1 April 1987 following the privatization of JNR.

The station closed on 1 December 2003 along with the rest of the non-electrified section of the Kabe Line.

During the Kabe Line extension towards Aki-Kameyama, the station was demolished.

== Surrounding area ==
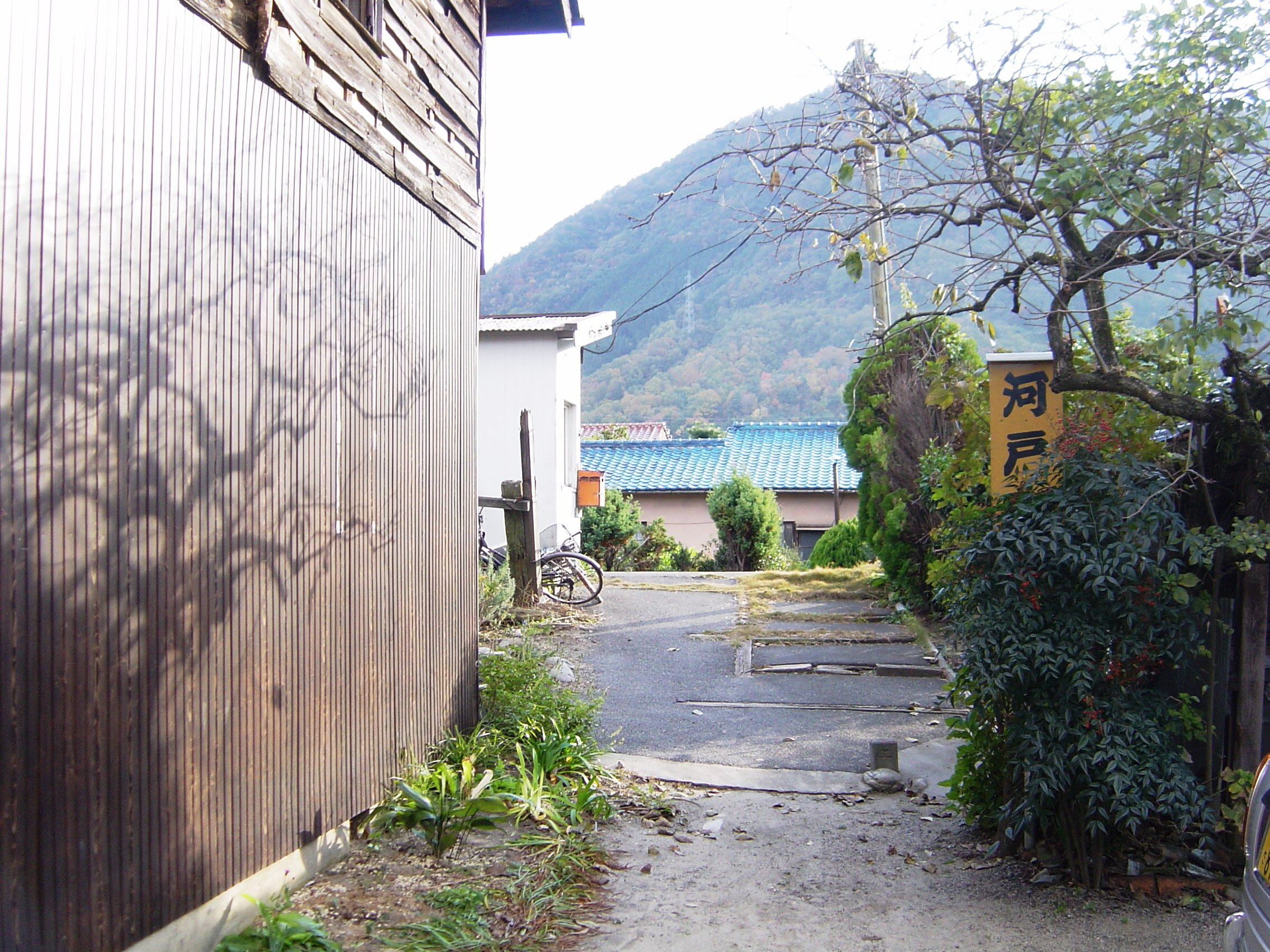
The alleyway leading to the closed Kōdo Station (November 2005)

Kōdo Station was located to the west of the central part of the Kabe residential areas. The station was surrounded by densely packed houses, and found at the end of a now little used alley. The Ōta River is located several hundred meters to the south of the station.

- Kabe Yokkaichi Contract Branch Post Office
- Kabe Kindergarten
- Tomotetsu Industries headquarters
- Hiroshima Municipal Kameyama-Minami Elementary School
- Hiroshima Municipal Kameyama-Minami Junior High School

== Highway access ==
- National Route 54
- Hiroshima Prefectural Route 177 (Shimosa Higashi Route)
- Hiroshima Prefectural Route 267 (Utsu-Kabe Route)
