= Midorii Station =

Railway station in Hiroshima, Japan

B 09 Midorii Station 緑井駅
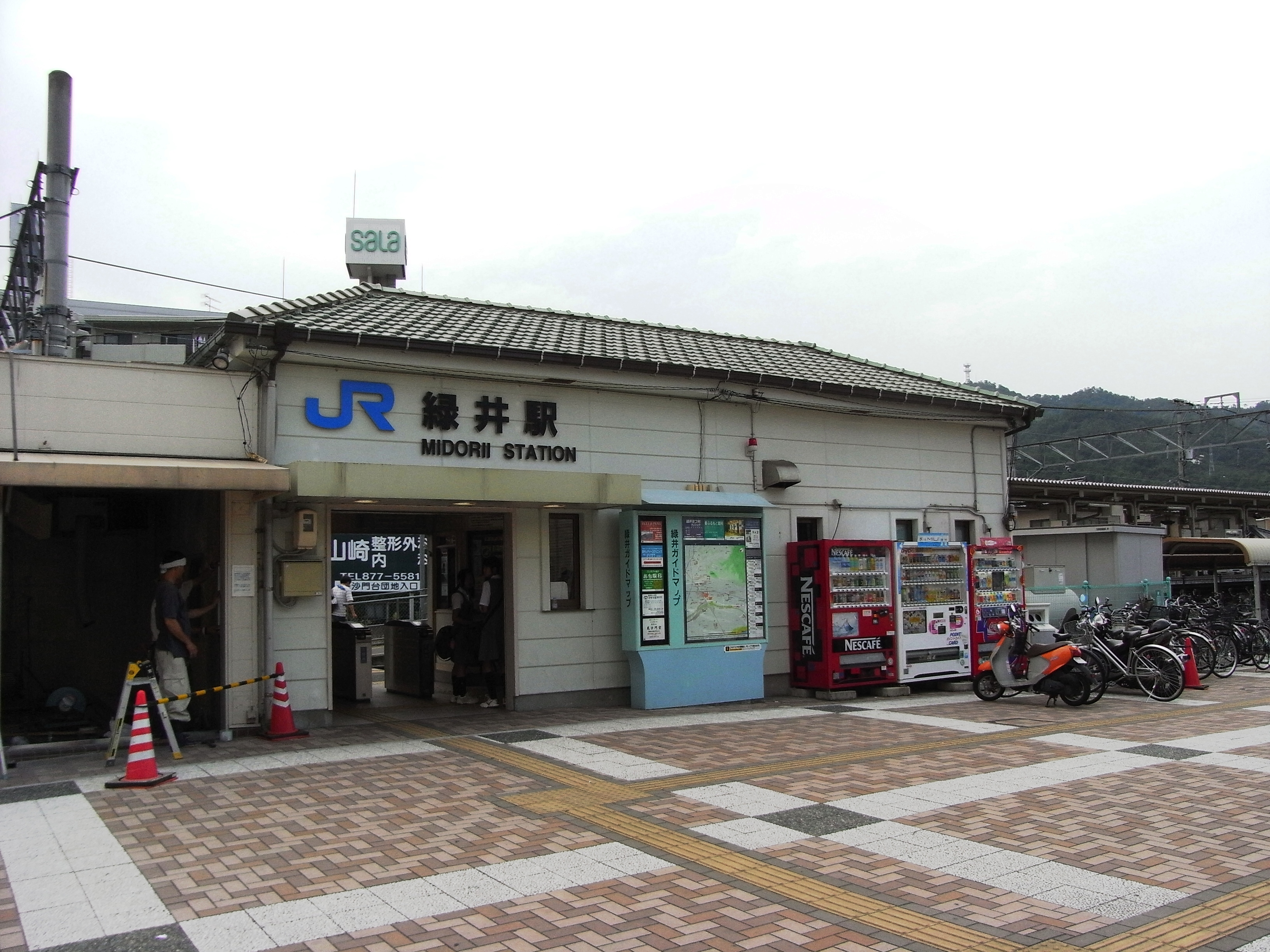
- Midorii Station building (July 12, 2008)

General information
- Location: 4-chōme-10, Midorii, Asaminami Ward, Hiroshima City; Hiroshima Prefecture; Japan
- Coordinates: 34°28′1.8″N 132°28′32.6″E
- Operator: JR West
- Line: B Kabe Line
- Platforms: 1 island platform
- Tracks: 2

Construction
- Structure type: At grade

Other information
- Website: Official website

History
- Opened: 18 December 1910; 115 years ago

Passengers
- FY2020: 2,192 daily

Services
Preceding station	JR West	Following station
Shichikenjaya B 10 towards Aki-Kameyama	Kabe Line	Ōmachi B 08 towards Hiroshima
Location
- Location within Hiroshima Prefecture Location within Japan

Midorii Station (緑井駅, Midorii-eki) is a JR West Kabe Line station located in Midorii, Asaminami-ku, Hiroshima, Hiroshima Prefecture, Japan. It is the largest station within Asaminami-ku.

== Station layout ==
Midorii Station features one island platform handling two tracks. The station building is located south-west of the platform, and a railway crossing connects the platform and station building. The station features a ticket office. A large parking lot and bus stop is situated outside the station. Despite being the largest station in Asaminami-ku, Midorii Station is very simple in design and size when compared to Ōmachi Station and Shimo-Gion Station.

=== Platforms ===
1	■ Kabe Line	for Hiroshima
2	■ Kabe Line	for Kabe, Aki-Kameyama

== History ==
Midorii Station opened December 18, 1910. Japanese National Railways was privatized, and Midorii Station became a JR West station on April 1, 1987. In 1994 the station was upgraded from a single track side platform to a double track island platform.

== Surrounding area ==
- Sanyō Expressway Interchange
- Japan National Route 54
- Tenmaya department store
- Hiroshima Hiroshima Shimo-Midorii Post Office (no ATM)
- Hiroshima Municipal Kawauchi Elementary School
- Hiroshima Municipal Midorii Elementary School
- Hiroshima Asa Junior High School
- FujiGrand Midorii
- Midorii Tenmaya
- Hiroshima Bank
- Momiji Bank
- Hiroshima Credit Union
- ATMs: Asaminami Post Office, Hiroshima Bank, Momiji Bank
- JR West Geibi Line Akiyaguchi Station is located about 1.5 km east of Midorii Station
