= Nakashima Station =

Railway station in Hiroshima, Japan

B 13 Nakashima Station 中島駅
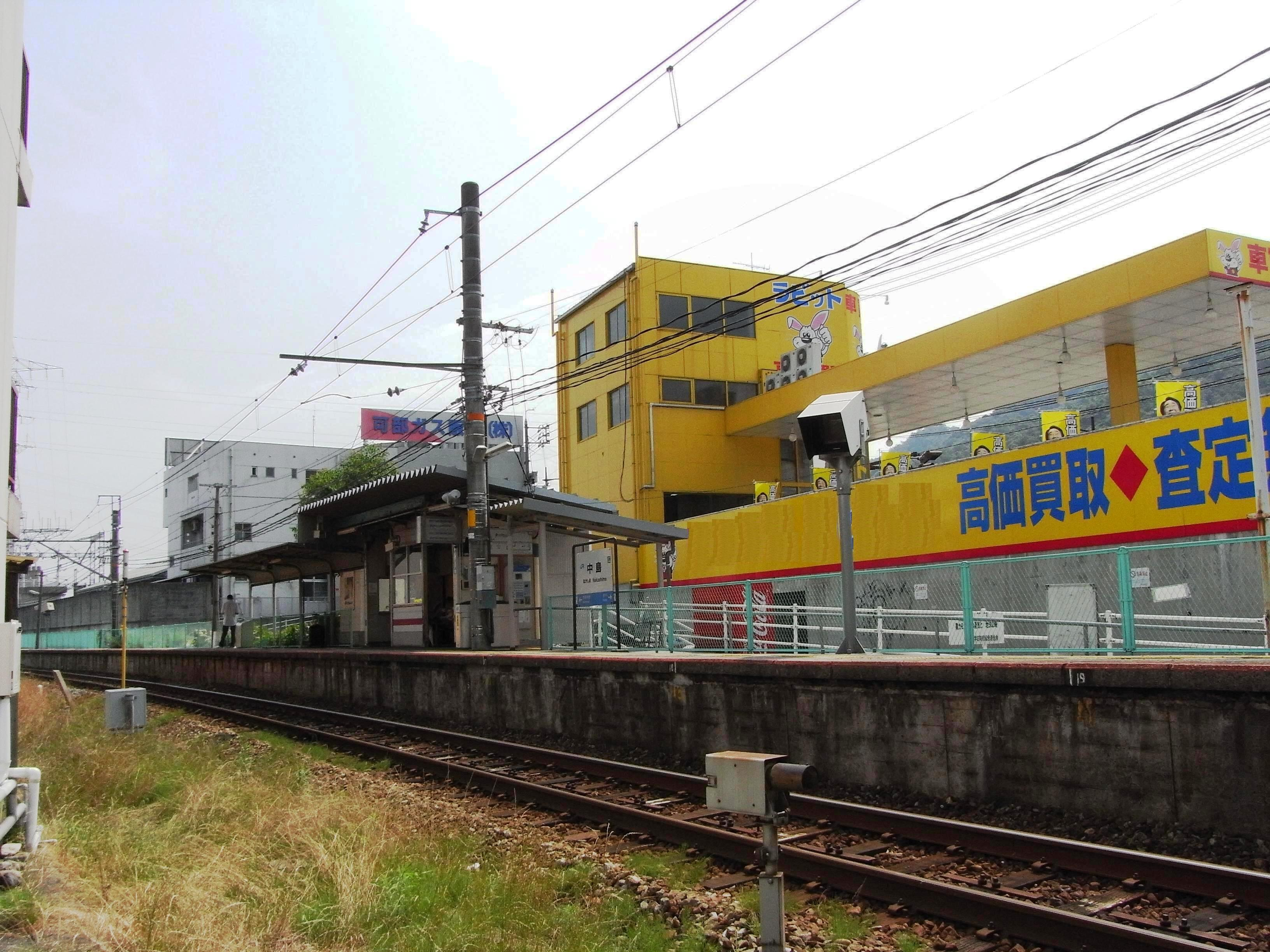
- Nakashima Station building (April 17, 2005)

General information
- Location: 1 Chome-2 Kabeminami, Asakita Ward, Hiroshima City, Hiroshima Prefecture; Japan
- Coordinates: 34°30′2.3″N 132°30′47.0″E
- Operator: JR West
- Line: B Kabe Line
- Platforms: 1 side platform
- Tracks: 1

Construction
- Structure type: At grade

Other information
- Station code: JR-B13
- Website: Official website

History
- Opened: June 12, 1911; 115 years ago

Passengers
- 2020: 720 daily

Services
Preceding station	JR West	Following station
Kabe B 14 towards Aki-Kameyama	Kabe Line	Kami-Yagi B 12 towards Hiroshima
Location
- Location within Hiroshima Prefecture Location within Japan

Nakashima Station (中島駅, Nakashima-eki) is a JR West Kabe Line station located in Kabe-Minami, Asaminami-ku, Hiroshima, Hiroshima Prefecture, Japan.

== Station layout ==
Nakashima Station features one side platform handling one bidirectional track. It has a small waiting room with two bench seats. There is a unisex pit toilet next to the waiting room. The platform is unstaffed, but features an automated ticket machine. The ticket gate accepts ICOCA passes as well as traditional tickets. Tickets for Nakashima are discarded in a box hanging next to the automated ticket machine. Improvements to raise the height and pitch of the platform and make improvements to the wheelchair ramp leading to the platform were completed in November 2012. An area for parking bicycles and two-wheeled vehicles is located on the far side of the station.

=== Platforms ===
1	■ Kabe Line	for Hiroshima, Kabe, Aki-Kameyama

== History ==
- 1911-06-12: Nakashima Station opens
- 1936-09-01: The station is renamed Aki-Nakashima Station
- 1943-10-01: Station operations suspended
- 1956-10-01: Station reopens and is renamed Nakashima Station
- 1987-04-01: Japanese National Railways is privatized, and Nakashima Station becomes a JR West station

== Surrounding area ==
- Japan National Route 54
- Hiroshima Municipal Kabe Minami Elementary School
- Hiroshima Bunkyo Women's University
- Nakashima Station Entrance Bus Station
- Kabe Driving School
- Kabe Public Employment Office
- Ōta River
- JR West Geibi Line Shimofukawa Station is located 1.5 km southwest
