= Bairin Station =

Railway station in Hiroshima, Japan

B 11 Bairin Station 梅林駅
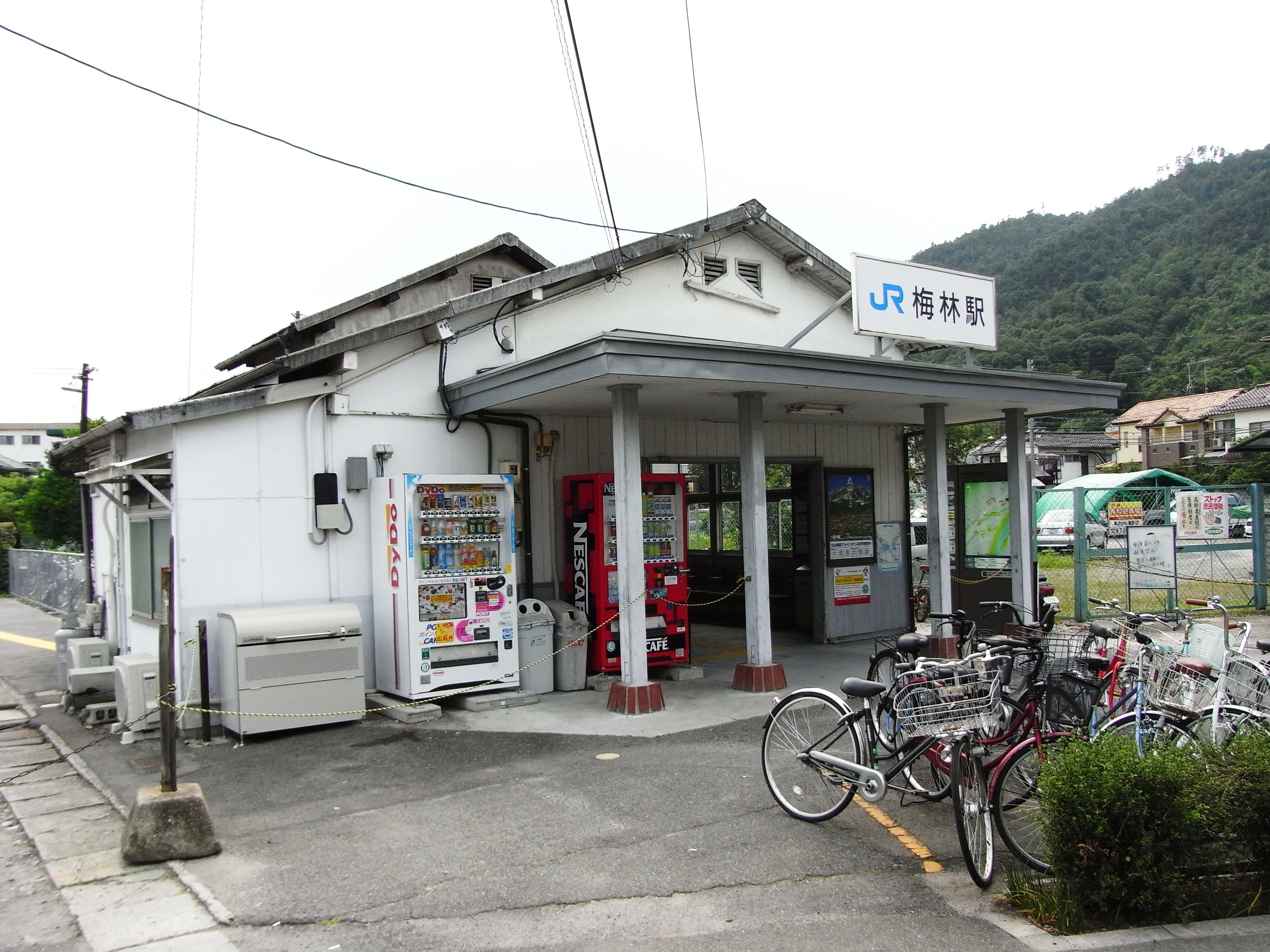
- Bairin Station building in July 2008

General information
- Location: 3 Chome-2 Yagi, Asaminami Ward, Hiroshima City, Hiroshima Prefecture; Japan
- Coordinates: 34°28′53″N 132°29′41″E
- Operator: JR West
- Line: B Kabe Line
- Platforms: 1 island platform
- Tracks: 2

Construction
- Structure type: At grade

Other information
- Station code: JR-B11
- Website: Official website

History
- Opened: December 25, 1910; 115 years ago

Passengers
- FY2020: 1,101 daily

Services
Preceding station	JR West	Following station
Kami-Yagi B 12 towards Aki-Kameyama	Kabe Line	Shichikenjaya B 10 towards Hiroshima
Location
- Location within Hiroshima Prefecture Location within Japan

Bairin Station (梅林駅, Bairin-eki) is a JR West Kabe Line station located in Yagi, Asaminami-ku, Hiroshima, Hiroshima Prefecture, Japan. The station was formerly named Yagi-Bairin Station.

== Station layout ==
Bairin Station features one island platform handling two tracks. The station building is to the west of the platform, and a railway crossing connects the platform and station building. The station is staffed during weekdays.

=== Platforms ===
1	B Kabe Line	for Hiroshima
2	B Kabe Line	for Kabe, Aki-Kameyama

== History ==
- 1910-12-25: Bairin Station opens
- 1987-04-01: Japanese National Railways is privatized, and Bairin Station becomes a JR West station

== Surrounding area ==
- Japan National Route 54
- JR West Geibi Line Kumura Station is located about 1.5 km east of Bairin Station
- Ōta River
