= Mitaki Station =

Railway station in Hiroshima, Japan

B 04 Mitaki Station 三滝駅
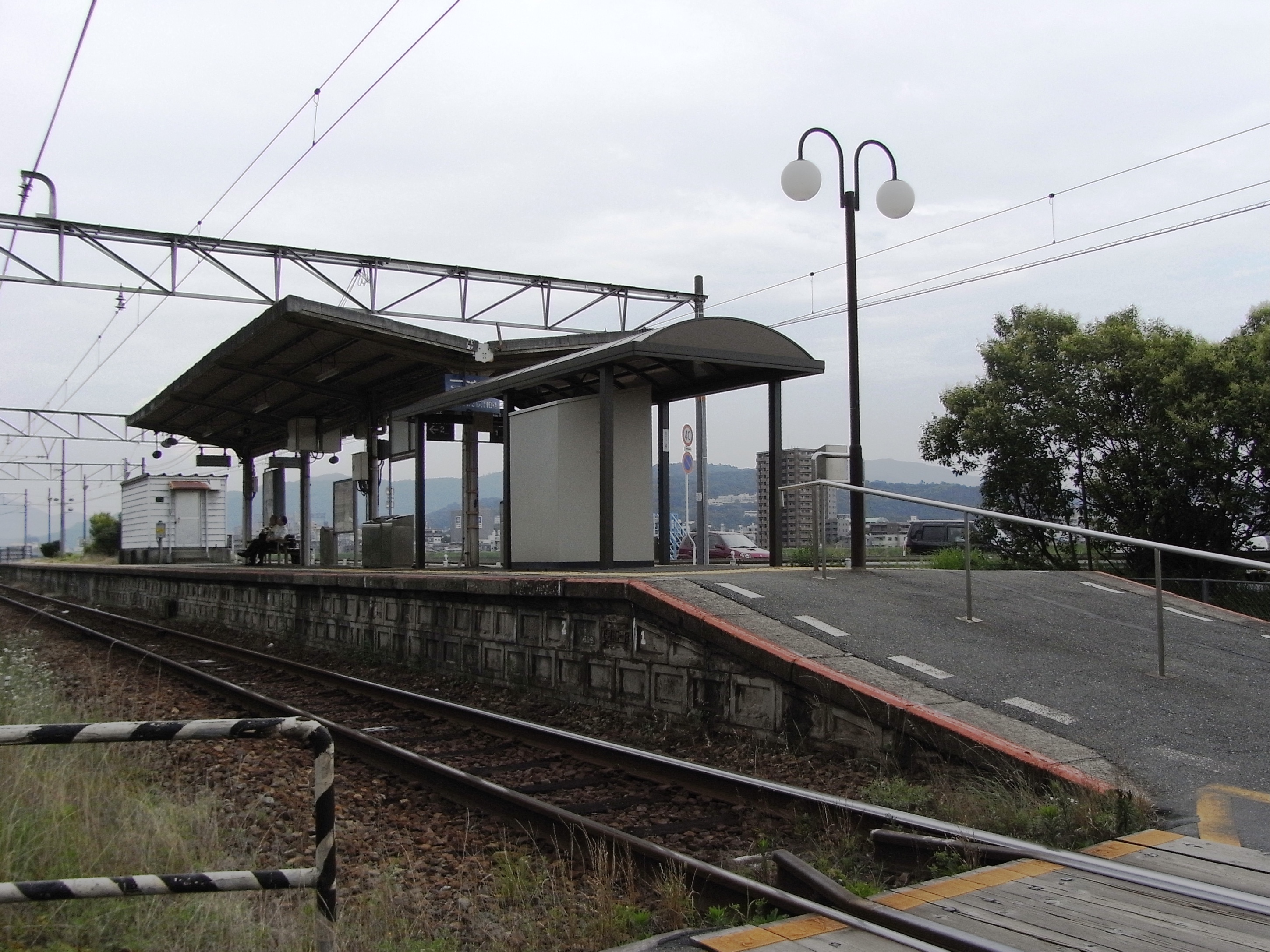
- Mitaki Station platform in July 2008

General information
- Location: 2 chome-6, Mitaki-honmachi, Nishi Ward, Hiroshima City, Hiroshima Prefecture; Japan
- Coordinates: 34°25′2.0″N 132°26′50.3″E
- Operator: JR West
- Line: B Kabe Line
- Platforms: 1 island platform
- Tracks: 2

Construction
- Structure type: At grade

Other information
- Station code: JR-B04
- Website: Official website

History
- Opened: 19 November 1909; 116 years ago

Passengers
- FY2020: 428 daily

Services
Preceding station	JR West	Following station
Aki-Nagatsuka B 05 towards Aki-Kameyama	Kabe Line	Yokogawa B 03 towards Hiroshima
Location
- Location within Hiroshima Prefecture Location within Japan

Mitaki Station (三滝駅, Mitaki-eki) is a JR West Kabe Line station located in Mitakihon-machi, Nishi-ku, Hiroshima, Hiroshima Prefecture, Japan.

== Station layout ==
Mitaki Station features one island platform serving two tracks. There is no station building, and access to the station is via a railway crossing that connects directly to the road. The station is unstaffed and features an automated ticket machine.

=== Platforms ===
1	■ Kabe Line	for Hiroshima
2	■ Kabe Line	for Kabe, Aki-Kameyama

== History ==
- 1909-11-19: Mitaki Station opened
- 1987-04-01: Japanese National Railways is privatized, and Mitaki Station becomes a JR West station

== Surrounding area ==
- National Route 54
- Mitaki-dera
- Mitaki Golf Course
- Ōta River (太田川)
