= Aki-Nagatsuka Station =

Railway station in Hiroshima, Japan

B 05 Aki-Nagatsuka Station 安芸長束駅
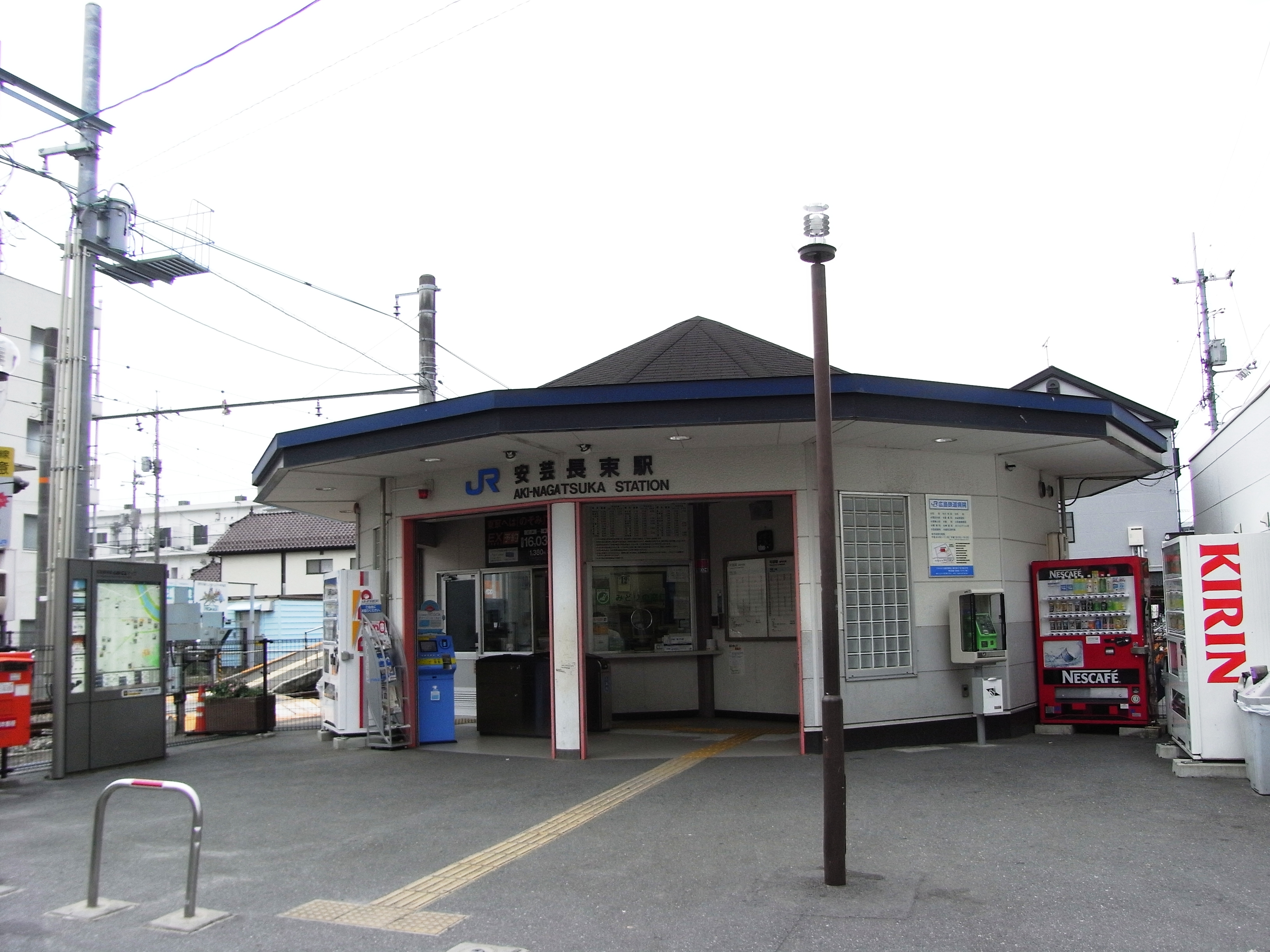
- Aki-Nagatsuka building in July 2008

General information
- Location: 4 chōme-1, Nagatsuka, Asaminami Ward, Hiroshima City; Hiroshima Prefecture; Japan
- Coordinates: 34°25′43.7″N 132°27′22.0″E
- Operator: JR West
- Line: B Kabe Line
- Platforms: 2 side platforms
- Tracks: 2

Construction
- Structure type: At grade

Other information
- Station code: JR-B05
- Website: Official website

History
- Opened: 19 November 1928; 97 years ago
- Former names: Daishi (1928–1933); Nagatsuka (1933–1936)

Passengers
- FY2020: 2,552 daily

Services
Preceding station	JR West	Following station
Shimo-Gion B 06 towards Aki-Kameyama	Kabe Line	Mitaki B 04 towards Hiroshima
Location
- Location within Hiroshima Prefecture Location within Japan

Aki-Nagatsuka Station (安芸長束駅, Aki-Nagatsuka-eki) is a JR West Kabe Line station located in Nagatsuka, Asaminami-ku, Hiroshima, Hiroshima Prefecture, Japan.

== History ==
- 1928-11-19: Daishi Station opens
- May 1930—June 1931: The station name is changed to Nagatsuka Station at some point during this time
- 1936-09-01: The station name is changed to Aki-Nagatsuka Station
- 1987-04-01: Japanese National Railways is privatized, and Aki-Nagatsuka Station becomes a JR West station
- 2015-11-28: Additional platform serving Aki-Kameyama bound trains was opened

== Station layout ==
Aki-Nagatsuka Station features two narrow side platforms serving two tracks. The station initially had one island platform, but a new side platform serving Aki-Kameyama bound trains was opened on November 28, 2015. After the opening of the new side platform, the old island platform was converted to serve only Hiroshima bound trains, and was fenced off from the Aki-Kameyama bound track. The station building is located north-west of the platforms, and is shaped like an octagon. A railway crossing connects the Hiroshima bound platform to the station building. The station is staffed and features automated ticket machines as well.

=== Platforms ===
1	■ Kabe Line	for Hiroshima
2	■ Kabe Line	for Kabe, Aki-Kameyama

== Surrounding Area ==
- Japan National Route 54
- Hiroshima Asaminami Post Office
- Hiroshima Nagatsuka Post Office
- Hiroshima Municipal Nagatsuka Elementary School
- Hiroshima Municipal Nishi Nagatsuka Elementary School
- Hiroshima Municipal Nagatsuka Junior High School
- Hiroshima Bunka Two-Year College
- Ōta River (太田川)
