= Kami-Yagi Station =

Railway station in Hiroshima, Japan

B 12 Kami-Yagi Station 上八木駅
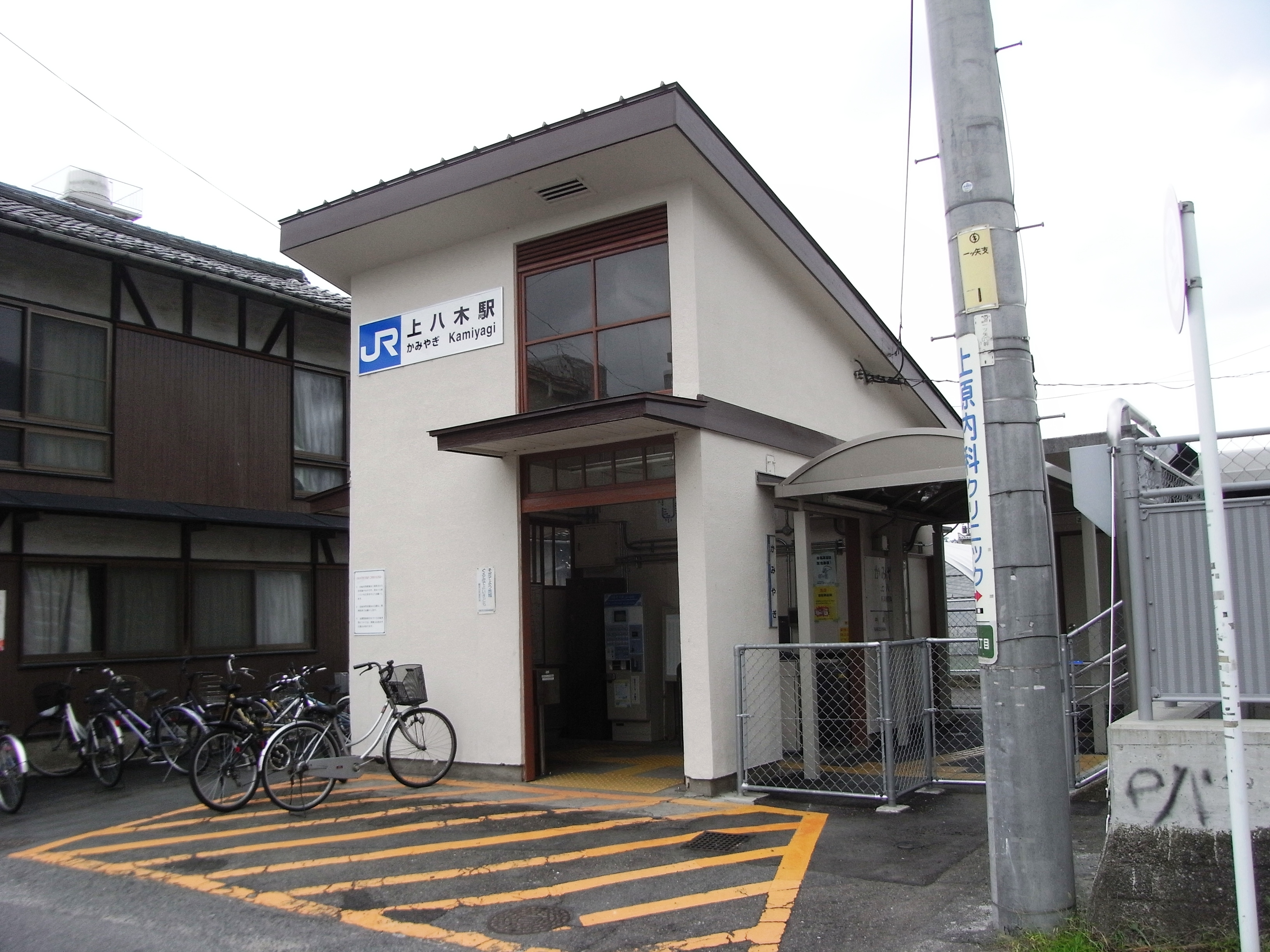
- Kabe Station building in July 2008

General information
- Location: 8 Chome-15 Yagi, Asaminami Ward, Hiroshima City; Hiroshima Prefecture; Japan
- Coordinates: 34°29′24.3″N 132°30′22.2″E
- Operator: JR West
- Line: B Kabe Line
- Platforms: 1 side platform
- Tracks: 1

Construction
- Structure type: At grade

Other information
- Station code: JR-B12
- Website: Official website

History
- Opened: 25 December 1910; 115 years ago

Passengers
- FY2020: 443 daily

Services
Preceding station	JR West	Following station
Nakashima B 13 towards Aki-Kameyama	Kabe Line	Bairin B 11 towards Hiroshima
Location
- Location within Hiroshima Prefecture Location within Japan

Kami-Yagi Station (上八木駅, Kami-Yagi-eki) is a JR West Kabe Line station located in Yagi, Asaminami-ku, Hiroshima, Hiroshima Prefecture, Japan.

== Station layout ==
Kami-Yagi Station features one side platform handling one bidirectional track. The station is unstaffed, and contains an automatic ticket machine.

=== Platforms ===
1	■ Kabe Line	for Hiroshima, Kabe, Aki-Kameyama

== History ==
- 1910-12-25: Station opens under the name of Ōtagawabashi
- 1929-12-02: The track around Ōtagawabashi Station is electrified
- 1936-09-01: The station is renamed to Kami-Yagi Station when the Kabe line is nationalized
- 1987-04-01: Japanese National Railways is privatized, and Kami-Yagi Station becomes a JR West station
- 2008-03-15: Platform is extended to allow 4 car trains to stop

== Surrounding area ==
- Japan National Route 54
- Hiroshima Municipal Yagi Elementary School
- Ōta River
