= Furuichibashi Station =

Railway station in Hiroshima, Japan

B 07 Furuichibashi Station 古市橋駅
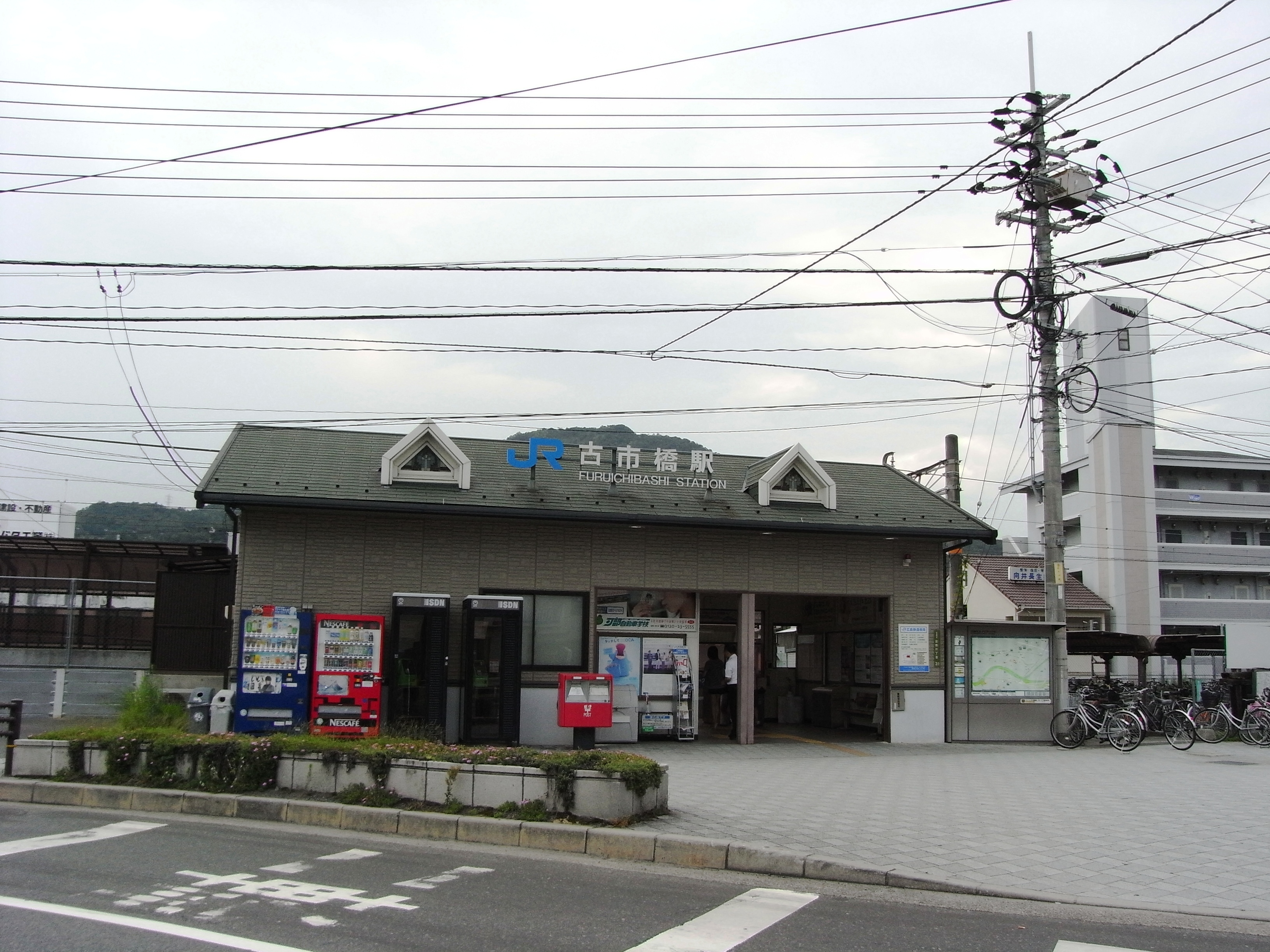
- Furuichibashi Station building in July 2008

General information
- Location: 4 chōme-5, Furuichi, Asaminami Ward, Hiroshima City; Hiroshima Prefecture; Japan
- Coordinates: 34°27′3.6″N 132°28′5.9″E
- Operator: JR West
- Line: B Kabe Line
- Platforms: 2 side platforms
- Tracks: 2

Construction
- Structure type: At grade

Other information
- Website: Official website

History
- Opened: 19 November 1909; 116 years ago

Passengers
- FY2020: 1,605 daily

Services
Preceding station	JR West	Following station
Ōmachi B 08 towards Aki-Kameyama	Kabe Line	Shimo-Gion B 06 towards Hiroshima
Location
- Location within Hiroshima Prefecture Location within Japan

Furuichibashi Station (古市橋駅, Furuichibashi-eki) is a JR West Kabe Line station located in Furuichi, Asaminami-ku, Hiroshima, Hiroshima Prefecture, Japan.

== Station layout ==
Furuichibashi Station features two side platforms serving two tracks. The station building is next to the Hiroshima bound platform. There is no overpass; passengers must use a railway crossing to reach the other platform. A ticket office is available at this station during the daytime.

=== Platforms ===
1	Kabe Line	for Hiroshima
2	Kabe Line	for Kabe, Aki-Kameyama

== History ==
- November 19, 1909: Furuichibashi Station opens
- April 1, 1987: Japanese National Railways is privatized, and Furuichibashi Station becomes a JR West station

== Surrounding Area ==
- Japan National Route 54
- Asaminami Ward Office
- Hiroshima Furuichi Post Office
- Hiroshima Municipal Furuichi Elementary School
- Hiroshima Municipal Ōmachi Elementary School
- Hiroshima Municipal Gion Kita High School
- Hiroshima Bank
- Iyo Bank
- Momiji Bank
- Hesaka Station, on the JR West Geibi Line
