= Shimofukawa Station =

Railway station in Hiroshima, Japan

Coordinates: 34°29′18.9″N 132°31′29.6″E

Shimofukawa Station 下深川駅
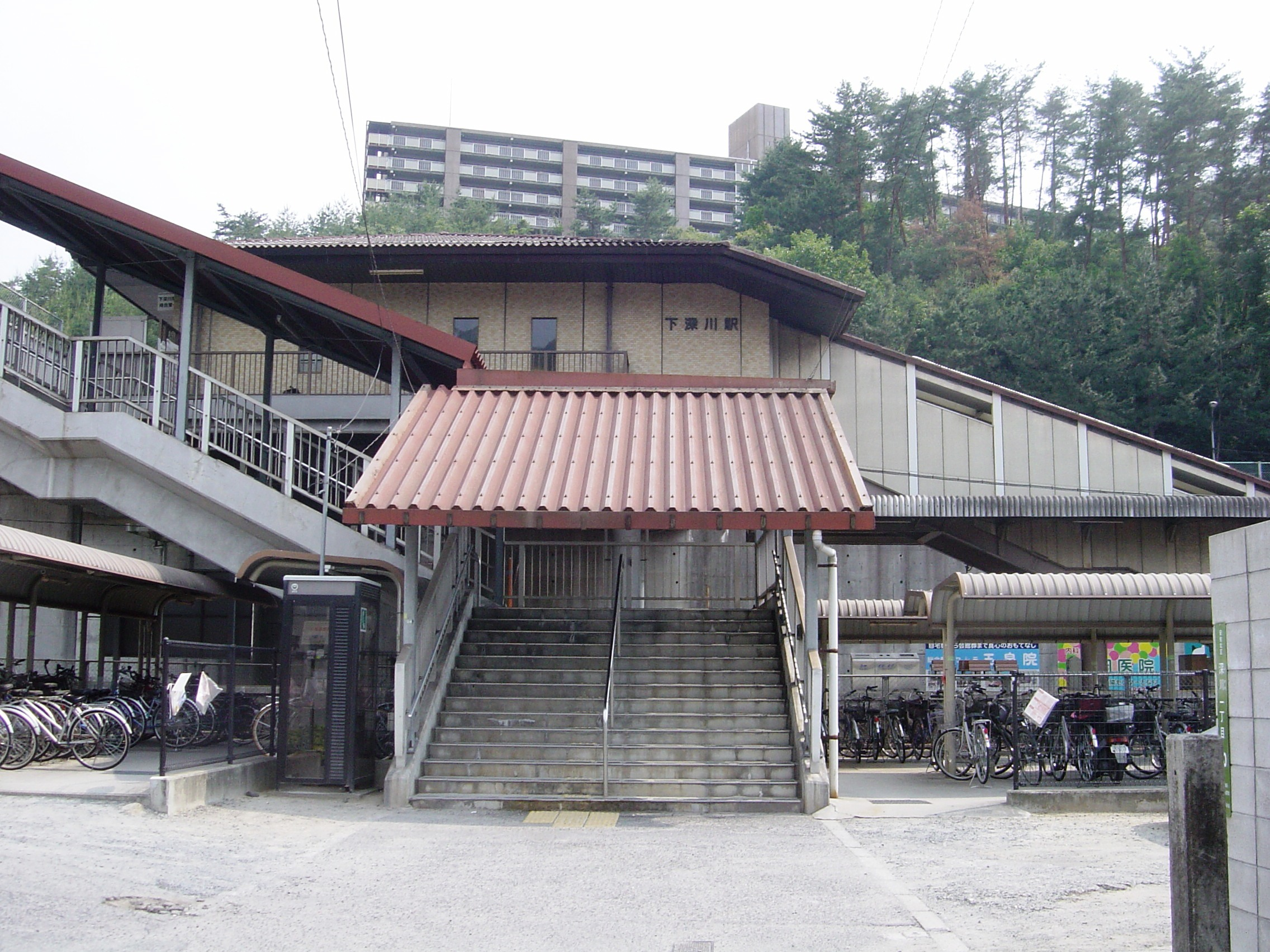
- Shimofukawa Station building (May 29, 2005).

General information
- Location: Asakita, Hiroshima, Hiroshima; Japan
- Operator: JR West
- Line: Geibi Line

History
- Opened: April 28, 1915
Location

Shimofukawa Station (下深川駅, Shimo-Fukawa-eki) is a JR West Geibi Line station located in 5-chōme, Fukawa, Asakita-ku, Hiroshima, Hiroshima Prefecture, Japan. This is the largest of the three Fukawa stations on the Geibi Line, and handles many trains daily.

== History ==
The current station building was built sometime during the Japanese National Railways era. An automatic ticket gate was installed in 2007.

- April 28, 1915: Shimofukawa Station opens
- April 1, 1987: Japanese National Railways is privatized, and Shimofukawa Station becomes a JR West station

== Station building and platforms ==
Shimofukawa Station features one island-style platform capable of handling two lines simultaneously. The platform is located inside an old canal, with the station building located above the tracks on the north bank, overlooking the tracks and the enclosed footbridge which passes overhead the tracks. Shimofukawa Station is operated privately under contract with JR West. The station features a Green Window.

=== Environs ===
- Seizan Park (西山公園)
- Terasaku Park (寺迫公園)
- Asakita-ku Sports Center
- JR West Kabe Line Nakashima Station (1.5 km northwest)
- JR West Kabe Line Kamiyagi Station (2 km west)
- Hiroshima Municipal Kamezaki Elementary School
- Hiroshima Municipal Magame Elementary School
- Hiroshima Municipal Kamezaki Junior High School
- Hiroshima Municipal Ochiai Junior High School
- Misasa River (三篠川)
- Ōta River (太田川)
- Namcoland

=== Highway access ===
- Japan National Route 54
- Hiroshima Prefectural Route 37 (Hiroshima-Miyoshi Route)
- Hiroshima Prefectural Route 70 (Hiroshima-Nakashima Route)
- Hiroshima Prefectural Route 177 (Shimosa Higashi Route)
- Hiroshima Prefectural Route 240 (Kabe Teishajō Route)
- Hiroshima Prefectural Route 270 (Yagi-Midorii Route)

== Connecting lines ==
All lines are JR West lines.

Geibi Line
Miyoshi Express (#1, 2, 5, 6, 7, 8)

No stop

Miyoshi Express (#3, 4)

Shiwaguchi Station — Shimofukawa Station — Akiyaguchi Station

Commuter Liner

Karuga Station — Shimofukawa Station — Hiroshima Station

Miyoshi Liner/Local

Nakafukawa Station — Shimofukawa Station — Kumura Station
