= Shimo-Gion Station =

Railway station in Hiroshima, Japan

B 06 Shimo-Gion Station 下祗園駅
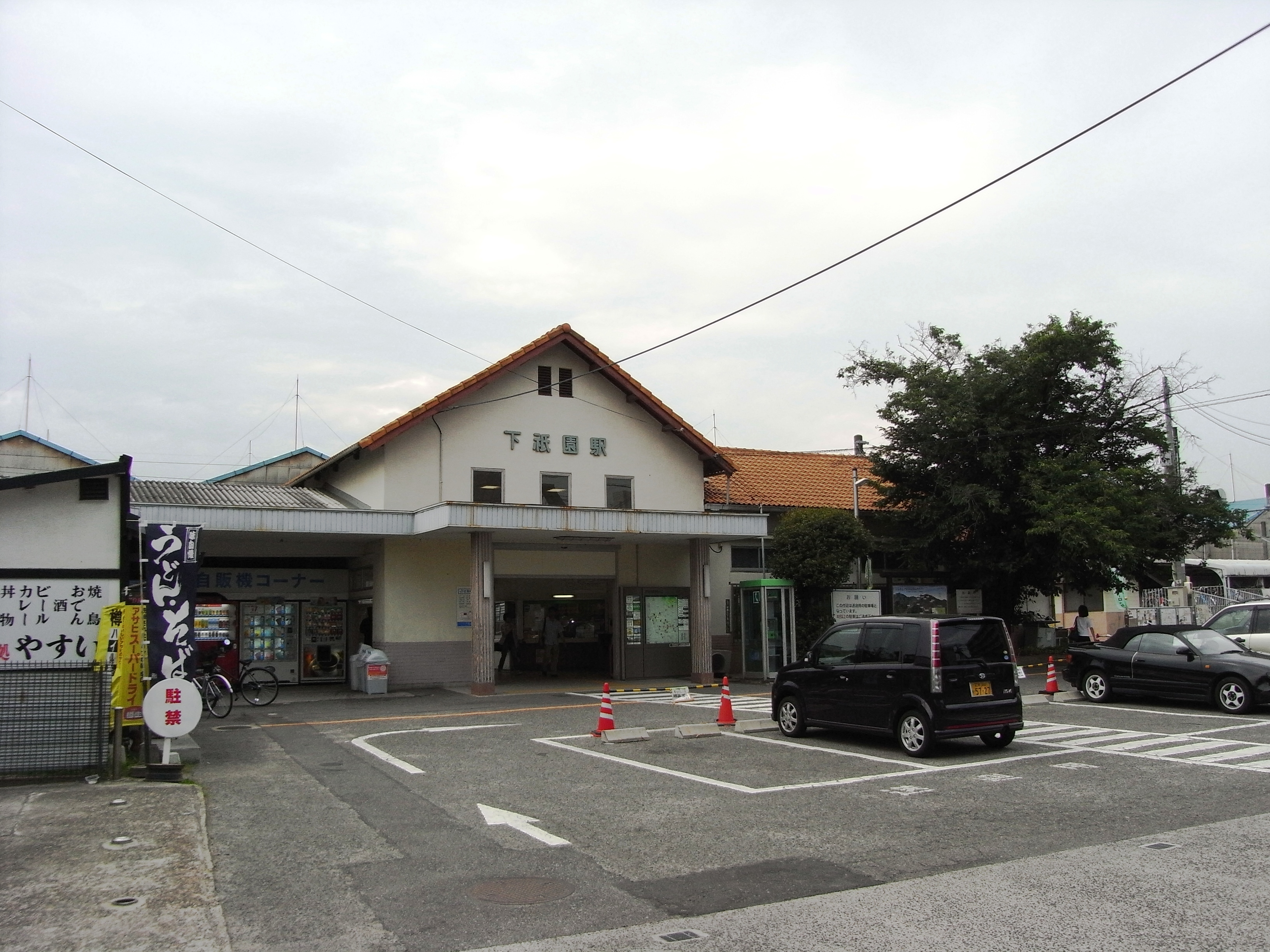
- Shimo-Gion Station building in July 2008

General information
- Location: 3 chōme-11, Gion, Asaminami Ward, Hiroshima City; Hiroshima Prefecture; Japan
- Coordinates: 34.4397°N 132.4627°E
- Operator: JR West
- Line: B Kabe Line
- Platforms: 1 island platform
- Tracks: 2

Construction
- Structure type: At grade

Other information
- Station code: JR-B06
- Website: Official website

History
- Opened: 19 November 1909; 116 years ago

Passengers
- FY2020: 4,481 daily

Services
Preceding station	JR West	Following station
Furuichibashi B 07 towards Aki-Kameyama	Kabe Line	Aki-Nagatsuka B 05 towards Hiroshima
Location
- Location within Hiroshima Prefecture Location within Japan

Shimo-Gion Station (下祗園駅 or 下祇園駅, Shimo-Gion-eki) is a JR West Kabe Line station located in Gion, Asaminami-ku, Hiroshima, Hiroshima Prefecture, Japan. The station name on the building uses an older kanji for the "gi", but in most current publications it is listed as 祗 or 祇).

== Station layout ==
Shimo-Gion Station had featured one island platform serving two tracks. The station building is to the north-east of the platforms, and are connected together by a railway crossing.

A new station was built, and the island platform was replaced by two separate side platforms linked by a pedestrian bridge outside of the station. There is no way to travel between platforms without passing through the fare gate.

Access to the platforms is restricted with ticket gates. A ticket office is available at this station.

=== Platforms ===
1	B Kabe Line	for Hiroshima
2	B Kabe Line	for Kabe, Aki-Kameyama

== History ==
- 1909-11-19: Shimo-Gion Station opens
- 1987-04-01: Japanese National Railways is privatized, and Shimo-Gion Station becomes a JR West station

== Surrounding Area ==
- Japan National Route 54
- Hiroshima Asaminami Post Office
- Hiroshima Naka-Gion Post Office
- Kobelco Construction Machinery (formerly Yutani Heavy Industries)
- Yume Town Gion
- Hiroshima Municipal Gion Elementary School
- Hiroshima Municipal Hara Elementary School
- Hiroshima Municipal Yamamoto Elementary School
- Hiroshima Municipal Gion Junior High School
- AICJ Junior High School
- AICJ High School
- Ōshimo Gakuen Gion High School
- Hiroshima University of Economics, including Hiroshima Economics Library
- Hesaka Station, on the JR West Geibi Line
