= Hiroshima Bunkyo Women's Junior College =

Coordinates: 34°30′18.5″N 132°31′11.3″E

- 広島文教女子大学短期大学部
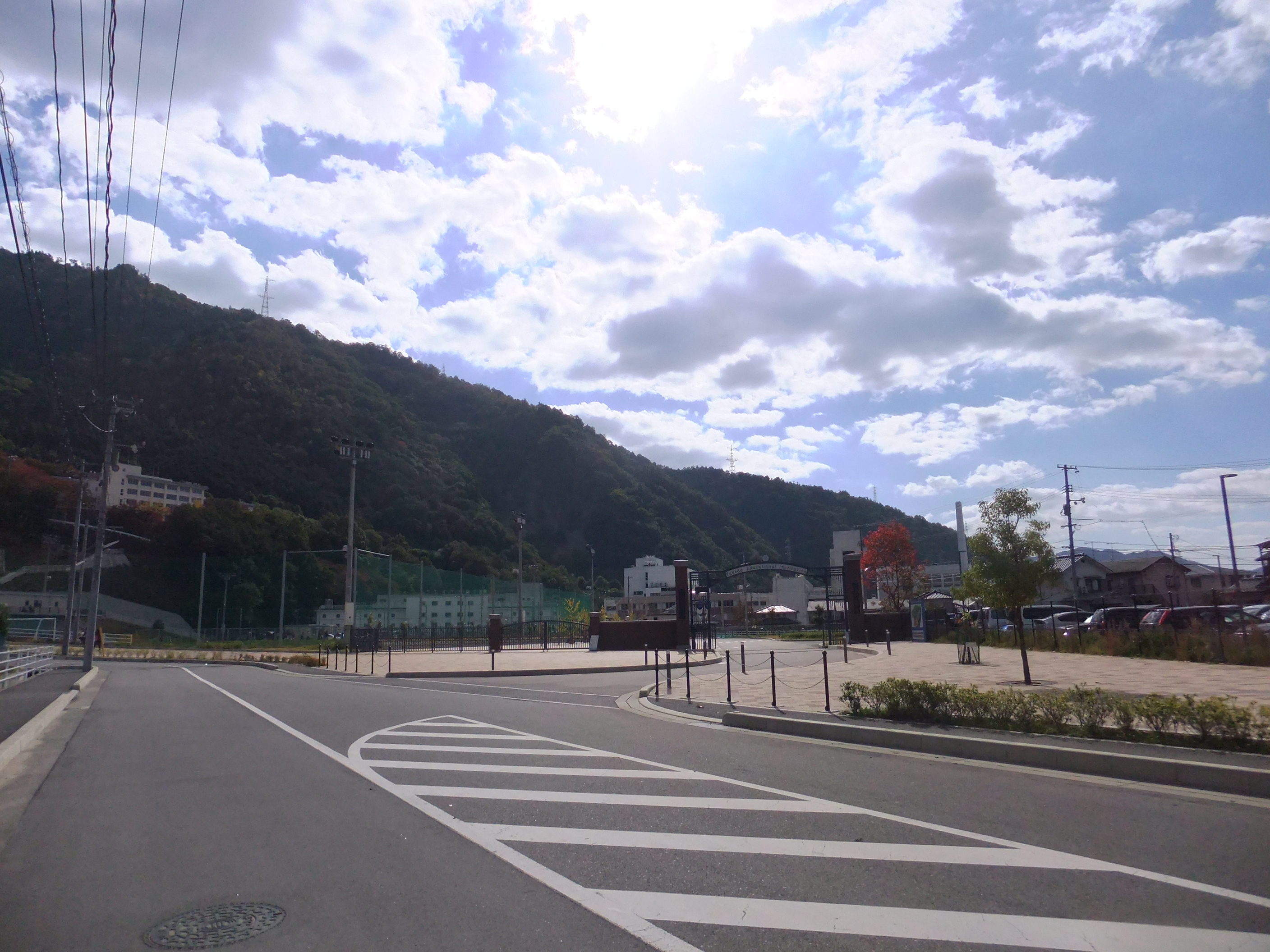
- Type: Private
- Active: 1962–2005
- Location: Asakita-ku, Hiroshima, Hiroshima Prefecture, Japan

Hiroshima Bunkyo Women's Junior College (広島文教女子大学短期大学部, Hiroshima Bunkyō Joshi Daigaku Tanki Daigakubu) is a private Junior College in Asakita-ku, Hiroshima, Japan.

It was established in 1962 as Kabe Women's Junior College (可部女子短期大学, Kabe Joshi Tanki Daigaku). The college was renamed to Hiroshima Bunkyo Women's Junior College in 2001 when it began offering degree qualifications. It closed in 2005.
