= Kōdo-Homachigawa Station =

Railway station in Hiroshima, Japan

B 15 Kōdo-Homachigawa Station 河戸帆待川駅
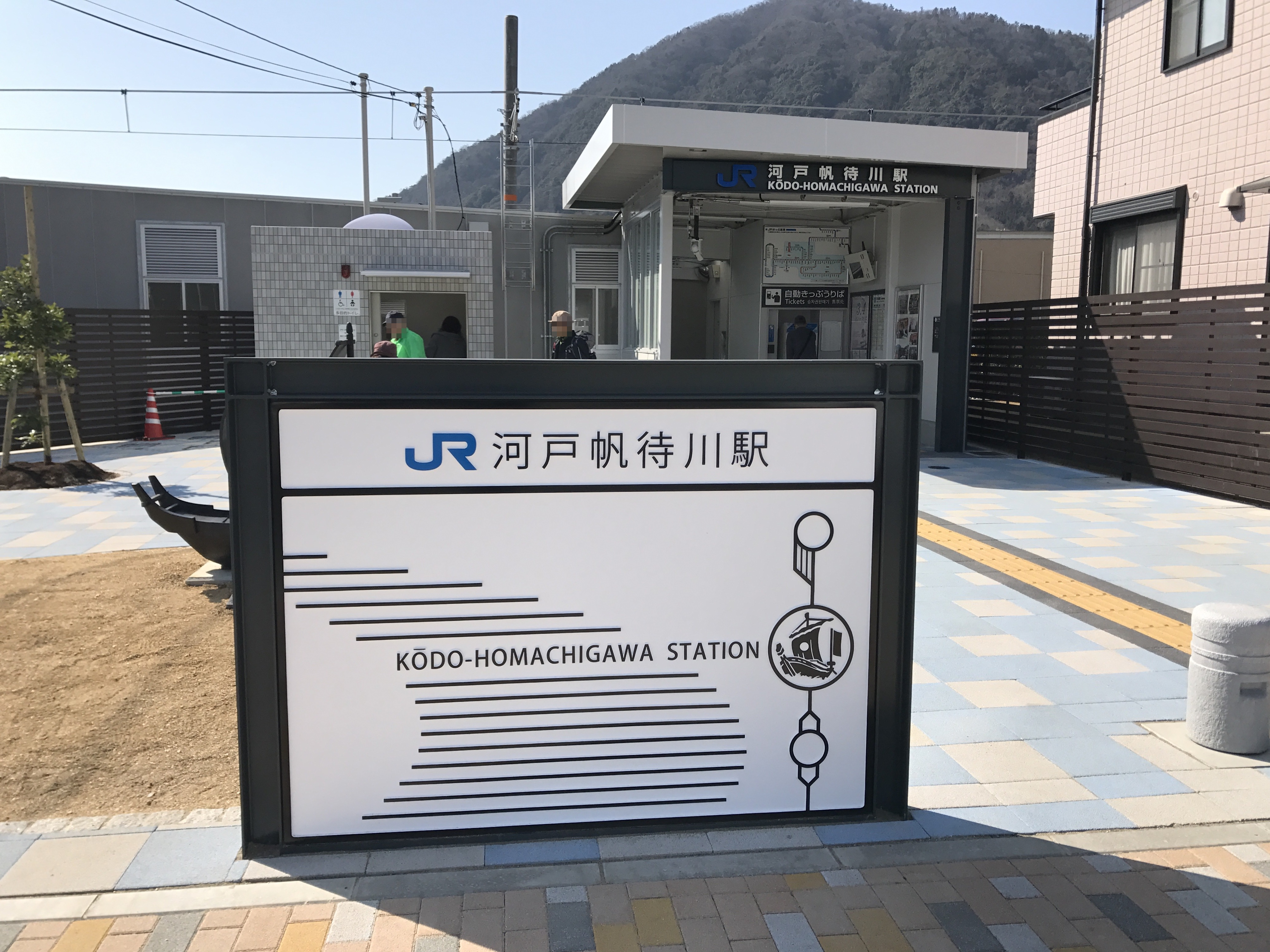
- Kōdo-Homachigawa Station in March 2017

General information
- Location: 2-27-12 Kameyama, Asakita Ward, Hiroshima City, Hiroshima Prefecture 731-0231; Japan
- Coordinates: 34.5167°N 132.505003°E
- Operator: JR West
- Line: B Kabe Line
- Distance: 14.8 km (9.2 mi) from Yokogawa
- Platforms: 1 side platform
- Tracks: 1

Other information
- Station code: B 15
- Website: Official website

History
- Opened: 4 March 2017; 9 years ago

Passengers
- 1,800 daily (forecast)

Services
Preceding station	JR West	Following station
Aki-Kameyama B 16 Terminus	Kabe Line	Kabe B 14 towards Hiroshima
Location
- Location within Hiroshima Prefecture Location within Japan

Kōdo-Homachigawa Station (河戸帆待川駅, Kōdo-homachigawa-eki) is a railway station on the Kabe Line in Hiroshima, Hiroshima Prefecture, Japan, operated by West Japan Railway Company (JR West). The station opened on 4 March 2017.

== Lines ==
Kōdo-Homachigawa Station is served by the Kabe Line.

== Layout ==
The station has one side platform serving a single bidirectional track at ground level.

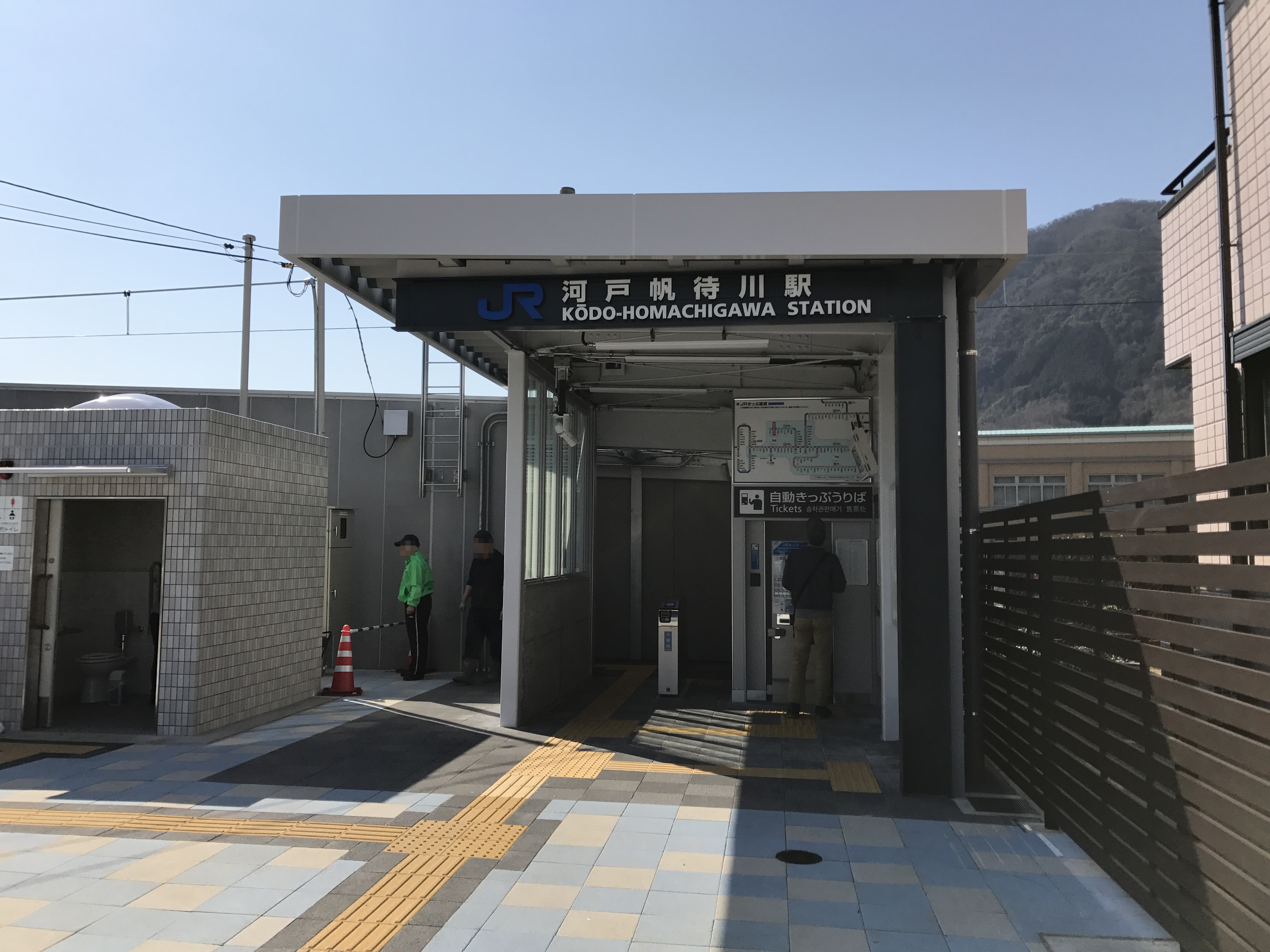
The station entrance in March 2017

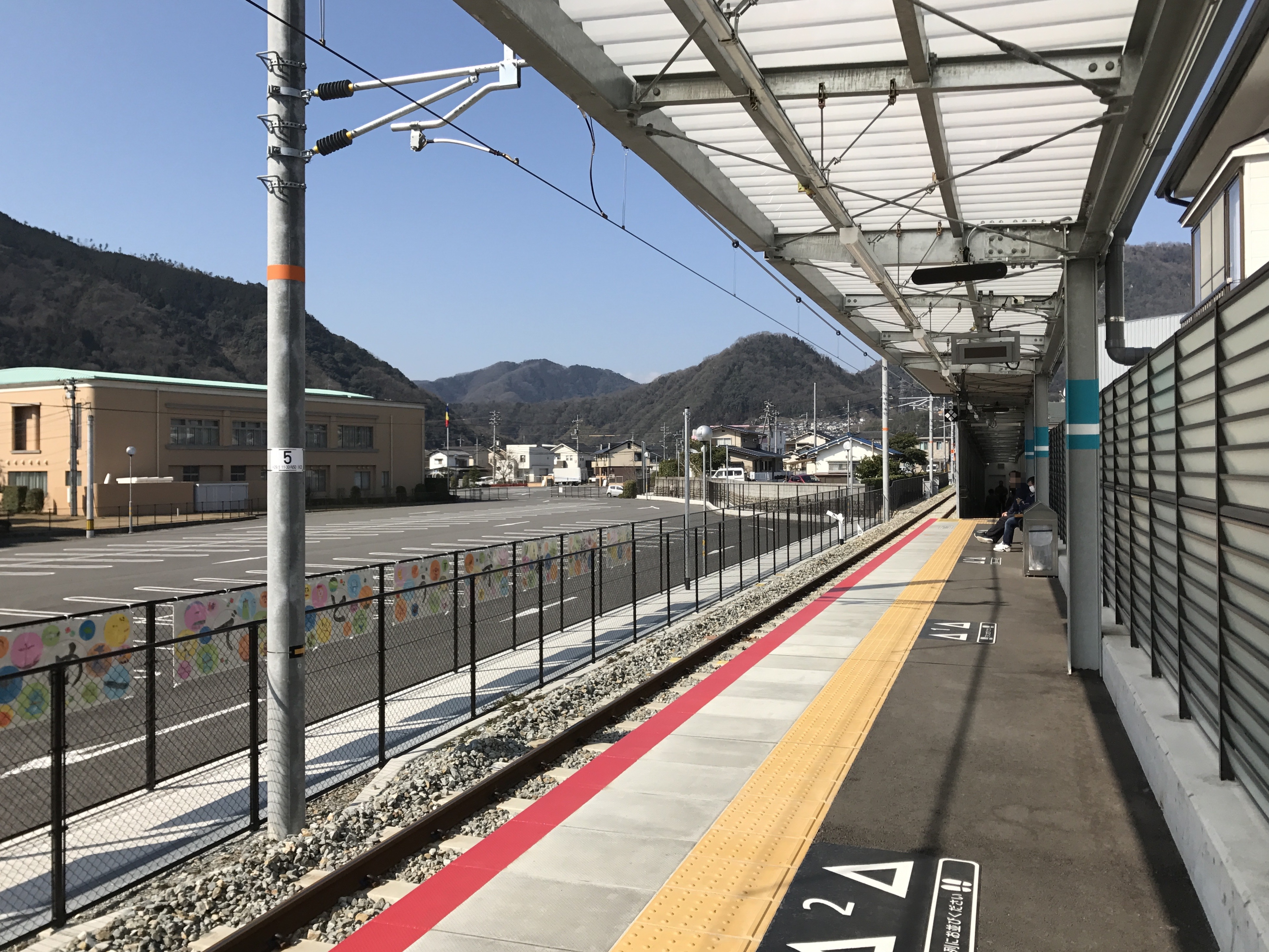
The platform in March 2017, looking west toward Aki-Kameyama

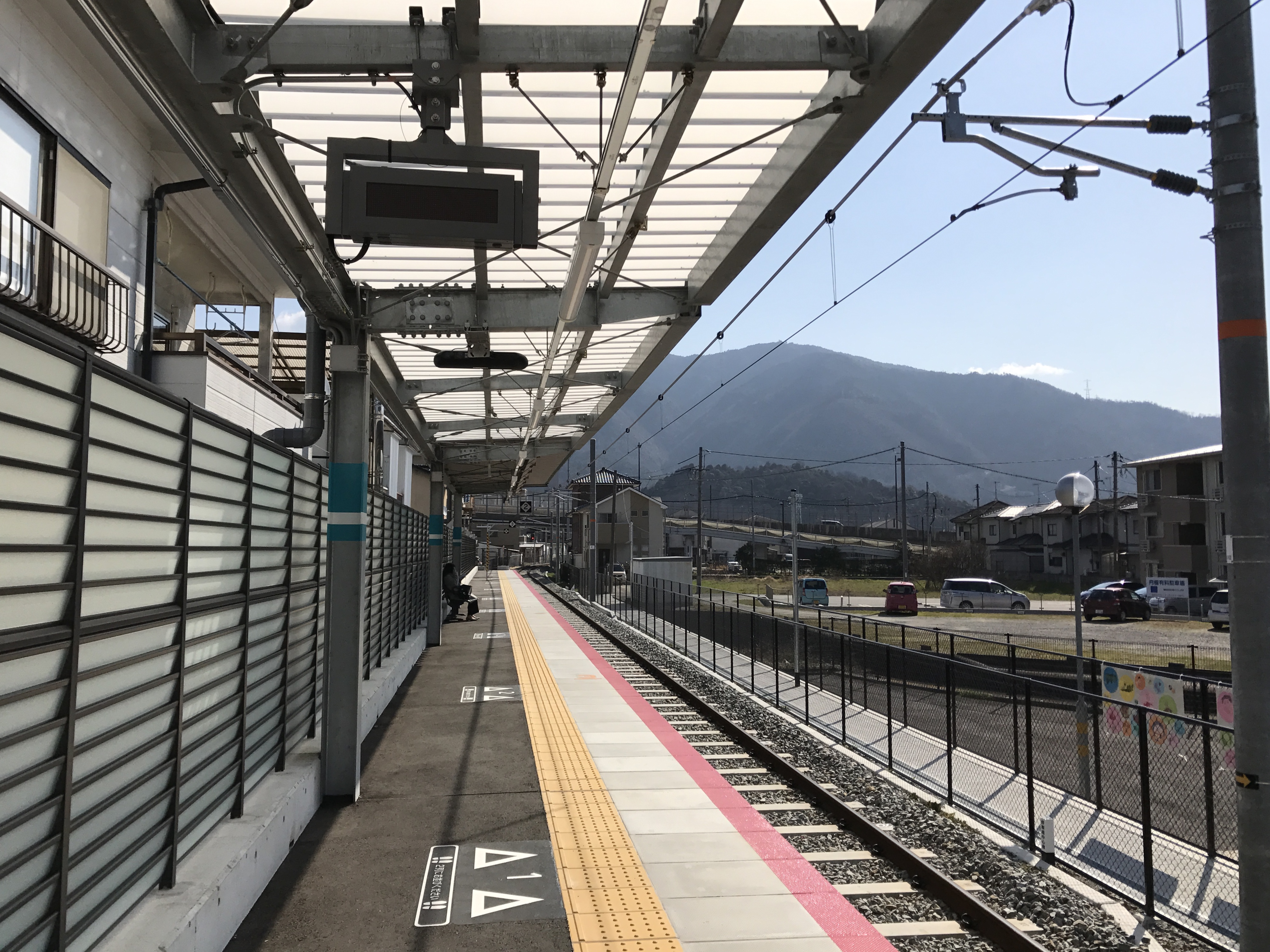
The platform in March 2017, looking east toward Kabe

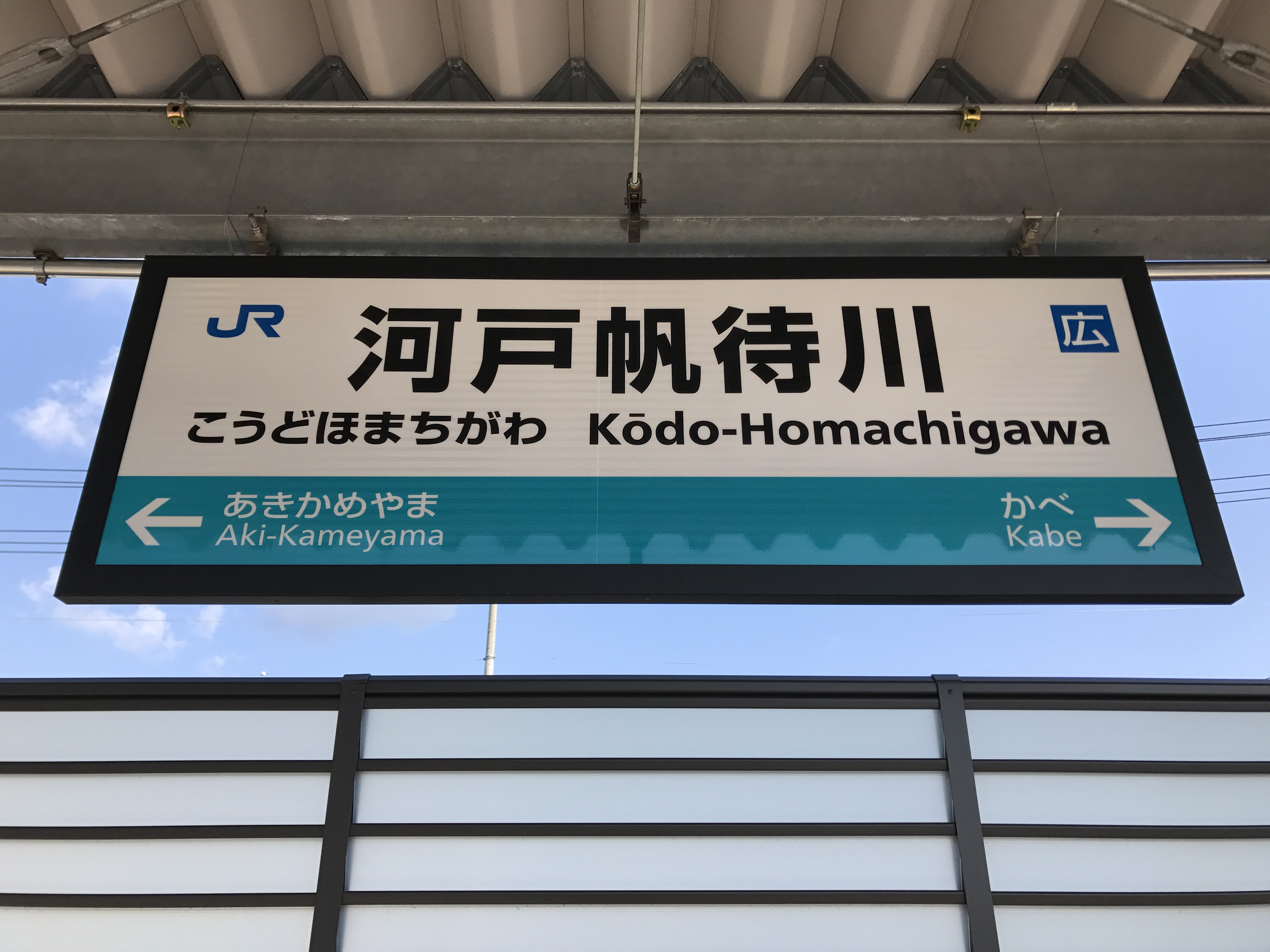
The station sign in March 2017

== History ==
The name of the new station was officially announced by JR West in July 2016. The station opened on 4 March 2017, coinciding with the reopening of 1.6 km of the Kabe Line from Kabe to Aki-Kameyama.

== Passenger statistics ==
The station is expected to be used by an average of approximately 1,800 passengers daily.

== Surrounding area ==
- National Route 54
- Asakita Ward Office

== See also ==
- List of railway stations in Japan
