= Mitaki-dera =

Buddhist temple in Hiroshima, Japan

Coordinates: 34°25′13.06″N 132°26′15.42″E

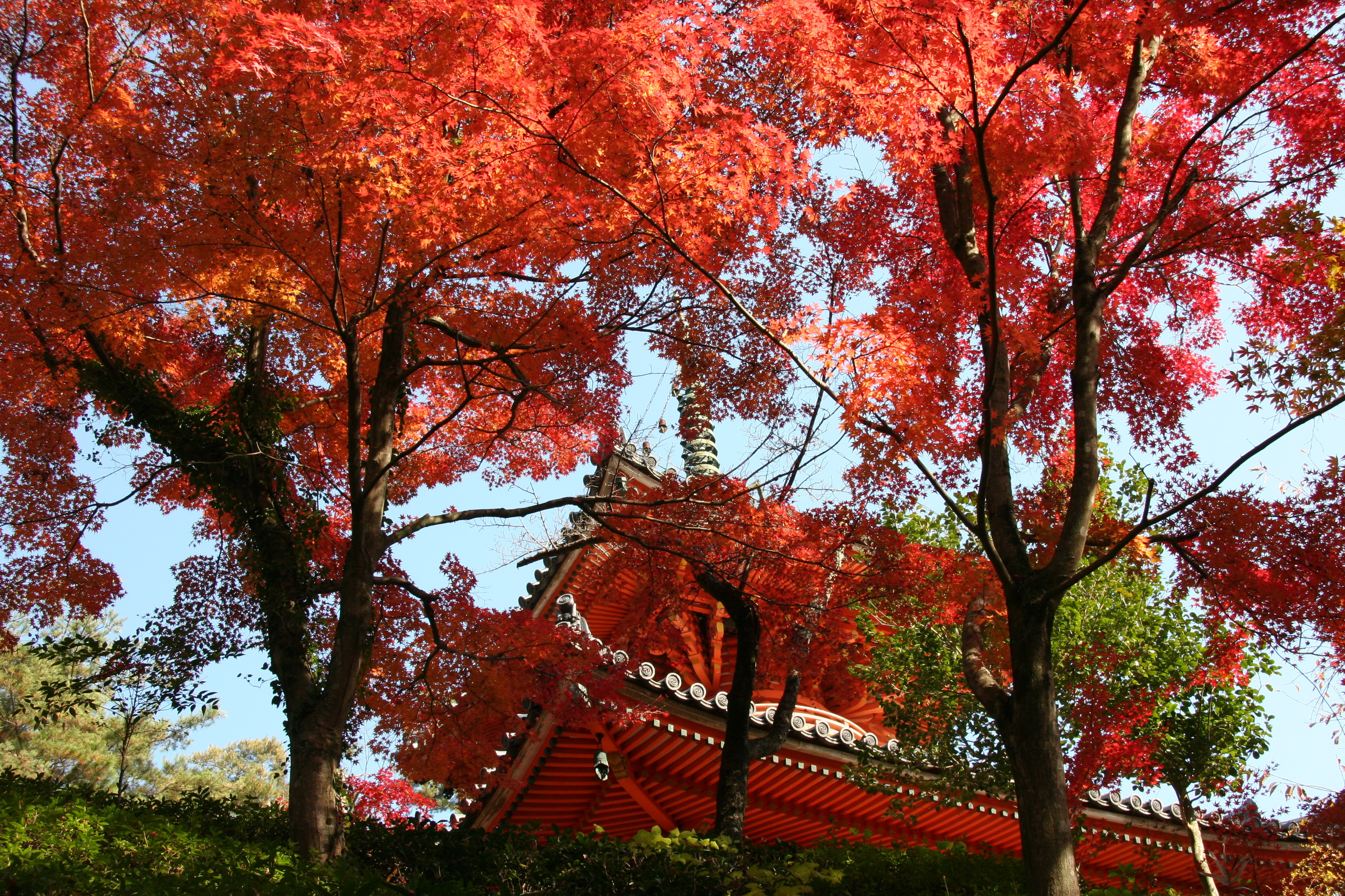
Mitaki-dera temple

Mitaki-dera (三瀧寺) is a historic Japanese temple in the city of Hiroshima, Japan.

== Overview ==
Mitaki-dera was founded in 809 during the Daidō era.

Mitaki-dera is familiar with the name of "Mitaki-Kannon" (三滝観音).

The temple grounds include three waterfalls, and their waters are used as an offering to the victims of the atomic bomb during the annual Hiroshima Peace Memorial Ceremony.

The tahōtō was dismantled from Hiro-Hachiman-jinja (広八幡神社) in Hirogawa, Wakayama in 1951, to hold a memorial service for the victims of the atomic bomb.

There is the wooden seated statue of Amida Nyorai in the Tahōtō.

Mitaki-dera is famous for sakura, autumn leaves and maples.

Mitaki-dera is the 13th of Chūgoku 33 Kannon Pilgrimage.

== See also ==
- Kannon
- Chūgoku 33 Kannon Pilgrimage
- Amida Nyorai
- Hiroshima Peace Memorial Ceremony
- Mitaki Station
