= Kabe Line =

Railway line in Hiroshima prefecture, Japan

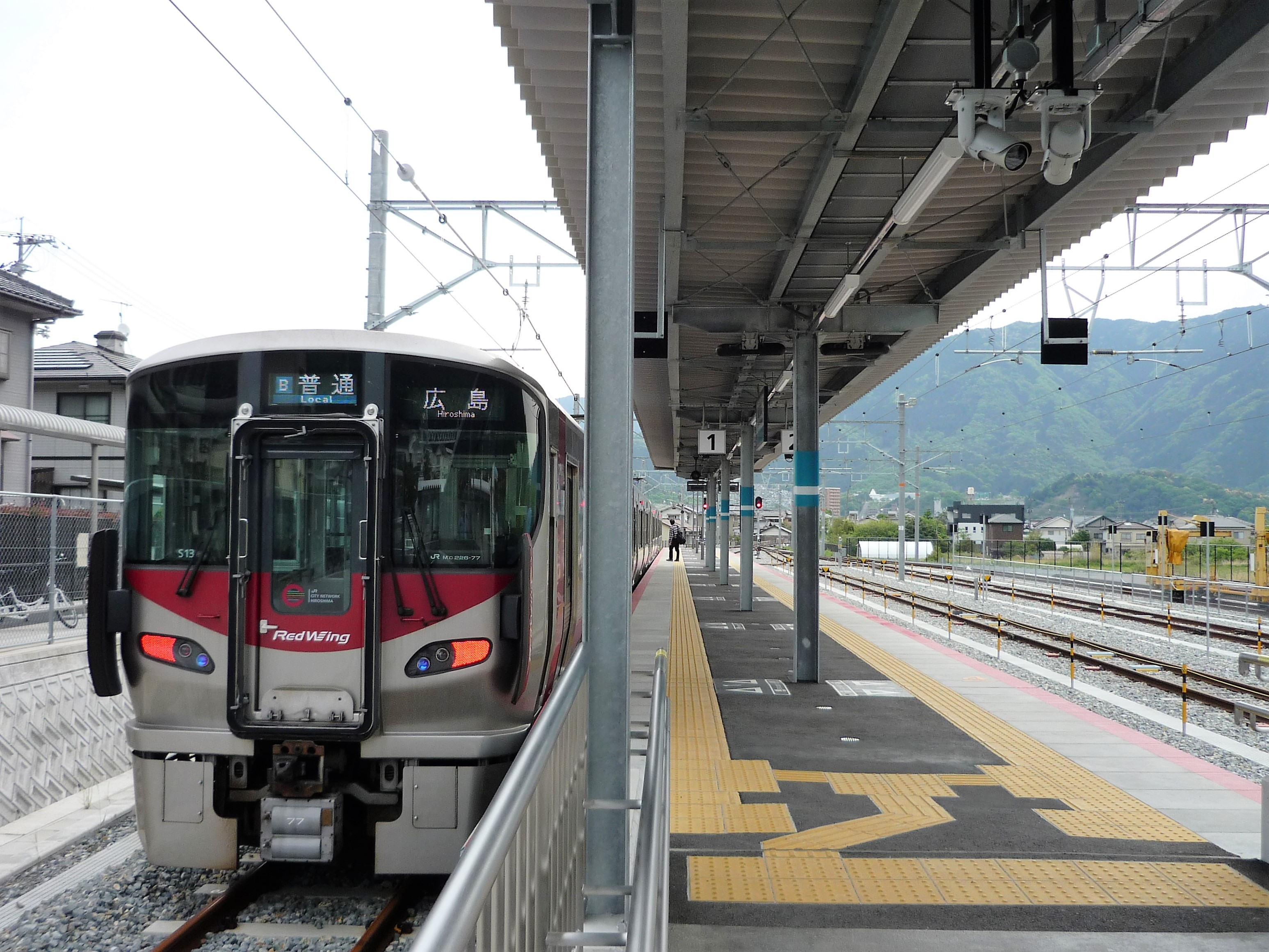
- A 227 series train at Aki-Kameyama

Overview
- Owner: JR West
- Locale: Hiroshima Prefecture
- Termini: Yokogawa; Aki-Kameyama
- Stations: 14

Service
- Type: Regional rail
- System: Hiroshima City Network

History
- Opened: 1909; 117 years ago

Technical
- Line length: 15.6 km (9.7 mi)
- Number of tracks: 1
- Track gauge: 1,067 mm (3 ft 6 in)
- Electrification: 1,500 V DC, overhead lines
- Operating speed: 65 km/h (40 mph)

The Kabe Line (可部線, Kabe-sen) is a railway line operated by West Japan Railway Company (JR West) within the city of Hiroshima in Japan. It connects Hiroshima Station and Aki-Kameyama Station in Asakita-ku. The actual junction station is Yokogawa. It is one of the commuter lines to Hiroshima.

== History ==
The Kabe Line was originally constructed by Dai-Nippon Light Railway. The line fully opened to Kabe station in 1911. The line was electrified at the start of Showa era. The line was nationalized on 1 September 1936, and became a part of Japanese Government Railways as the Kabe Line.

The line, as a part of a plan to connect Hamada, Shimane with Hiroshima, was slowly extended north from Kabe station.

The line voltage was raised from 750 V to 1,500 V (JNR standard) on 23 April 1962.

Since 4 September 1968, the line had been listed s one of the Deficit 83 Lines, a government's list of deficit-ridden railways where service was to be discontinued.

After JR West took over the line in 1987, one-man operation was introduced on the Kabe – Sandankyō section.

Beginning in summer 2007, the ICOCA card can be used in all stations in the Hiroshima City Network, including all stations on the Kabe Line.

On 4 February 2011, it was announced that a 1.6 km (0.99 mi) section of the abandoned segment, between Kabe Station and the former Kōdo Station, would be electrified and reopened. This will be the first such reopening by a JR Group company since the privatization of Japanese National Railways (JNR). Operation was scheduled to resume from fiscal 2015; the two new stations at Kōdo-Homachigawa and Aki-Kameyama finally opened on 4 March 2017.

=== Discontinued/suspended section ===
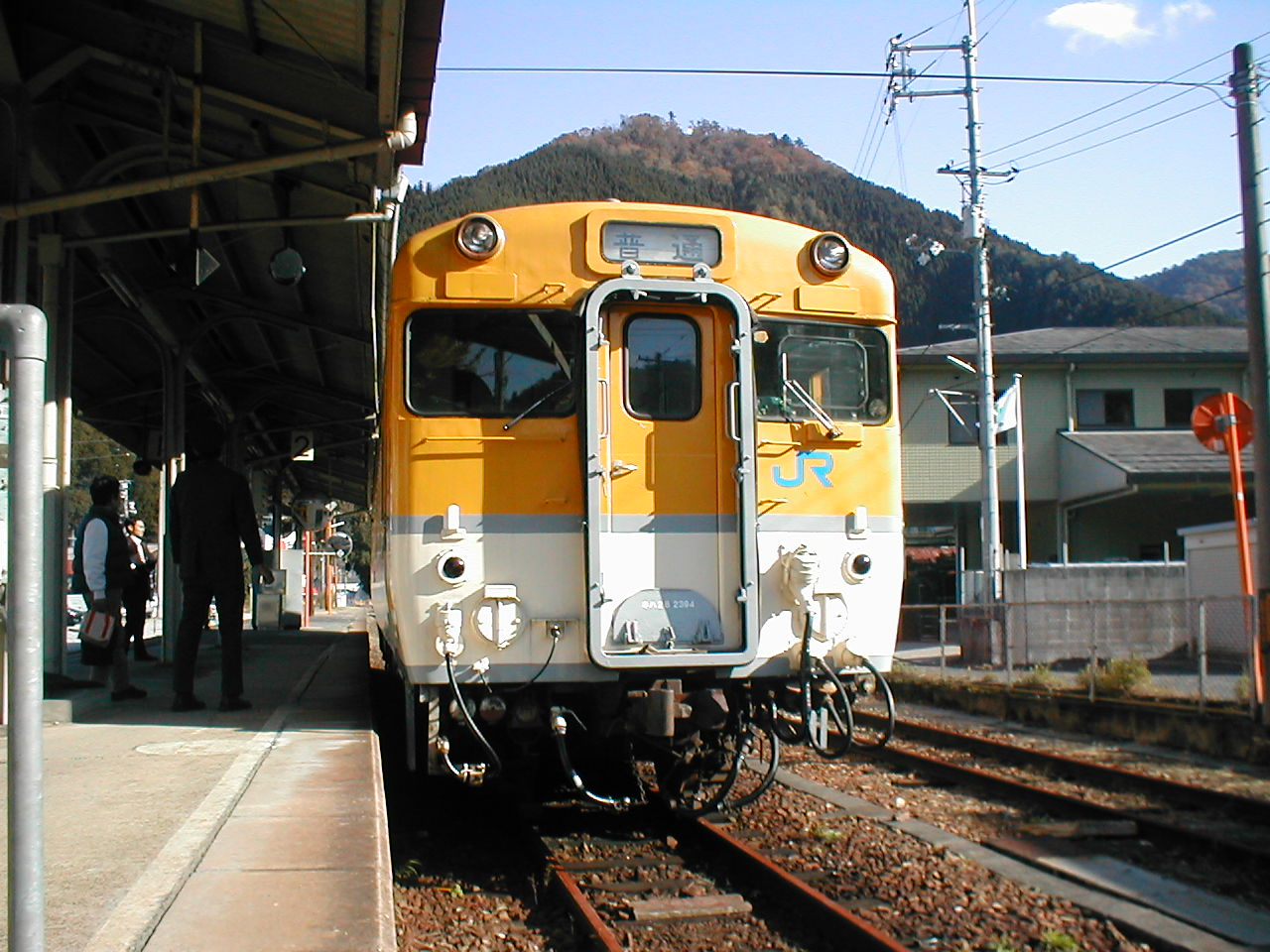
a train for non-electrified section at Kake Station

JGR extended the line beyond Kabe Station. The extended sections were not electrified.

- 13 October 1936: Extension to Aki-Imuro Station completed
- 30 March 1954: Extension to Kake Station completed (on completion of this extension, the total length of Japanese National Railways exceeded 20,000 km or 12,400 mi.)
- 27 July 1969: Extension to Sandankyō Station, 60.2 km (37.4 mi) from Yokogawa, completed

The line was intended to be extended to Hamada station on the Sanin Main Line, and construction on that section commenced in 1974, before being abandoned in 1980.

The Kabe – Sandankyō section was closed on 1 December 2003.

== Stations ==
Trains can pass at stations marked "||", "◇", "∨", and "∧". Trains cannot pass at stations marked "|".

No.	Station	Distance in km (mi)	Transfers	Tracks	Location
Sanyō Main Line
B 01	Hiroshima 広島	—N/a	San'yō Shinkansen; G San'yō Main Line (G 01); R San'yō Main Line (R 01); P Geibi Line (P 01); 1 2 5 6 Hiroden Main Line (M01)	||	Minami
B 02	Shin-Hakushima 新白島	—N/a	Astram Line	||	Naka
Kabe Line
B 03	Yokogawa 横川	0 (0)	R San'yō Main Line (R 03); 7 8 Hiroden Yokogawa Line (Y04)	∨	Nishi
B 04	Mitaki 三滝	1.1 (0.68)		◇	Nishi
B 05	Aki-Nagatsuka 安芸長束	2.6 (1.6)		◇	Asaminami
B 06	Shimo-Gion 下祗園	3.9 (2.4)		◇	Asaminami
B 07	Furuichibashi 古市橋	5.3 (3.3)		◇	Asaminami
B 08	Ōmachi 大町	6.5 (4.0)	Astram Line	|	Asaminami
B 09	Midorii 緑井	7.3 (4.5)		◇	Asaminami
B 10	Shichikenjaya 七軒茶屋	8.0 (5.0)		|	Asaminami
B 11	Bairin 梅林	9.6 (6.0)		◇	Asaminami
B 12	Kami-Yagi 上八木	11.2 (7.0)		|	Asaminami
B 13	Nakashima 中島	12.6 (7.8)		|	Asakita
B 14	Kabe 可部	14.0 (8.7)		◇	Asakita
B 15	Kōdo-Homachigawa 河戸帆待川	14.8 (9.2)		|	Asakita
B 16	Aki-Kameyama あき亀山	15.6 (9.7)		∧	Asakita

== Rolling stock ==
New 2- and 3-car 227 series electric trains were introduced on the Kabe Line from around 2015, replacing older 115 series trains. By 2019, all Kabe Line services were operated by 227 series trains.
