= Kabe Station (Hiroshima) =

Railway station in Hiroshima, Japan

B 14 Kabe Station 可部駅
- Kabe Station building in October 2026

General information
- Location: 2 Chome-27 Kabe, Asakita-ku, Hiroshima-shi; Japan
- Coordinates: 34.512728°N 132.510711°E
- Operator: JR West
- Line: B Kabe Line
- Platforms: 2 side platforms
- Tracks: 2

Construction
- Structure type: At grade

Other information
- Website: Official website

History
- Opened: July 13, 1911; 115 years ago

Passengers
- FY2020: 1,713 daily

Services
Preceding station	JR West	Following station
Kōdo-Homachigawa B 15 towards Aki-Kameyama	Kabe Line	Nakashima B 13 towards Hiroshima
Former services
Preceding station	JR West	Following station
Kōdo Closed 2003 towards Sandankyō	Kabe Line	Nakashima towards Hiroshima
Location
- Location within Hiroshima Prefecture Location within Japan

Kabe Station (可部駅, Kabe-eki) is a railway station on the Kabe Line in Asakita-ku, Hiroshima, Hiroshima Prefecture, Japan. It is operated by the West Japan Railway Company (JR West). From December 1, 2003, to March 4, 2017, it was the terminal station of the Kabe Line.

== Station layout ==
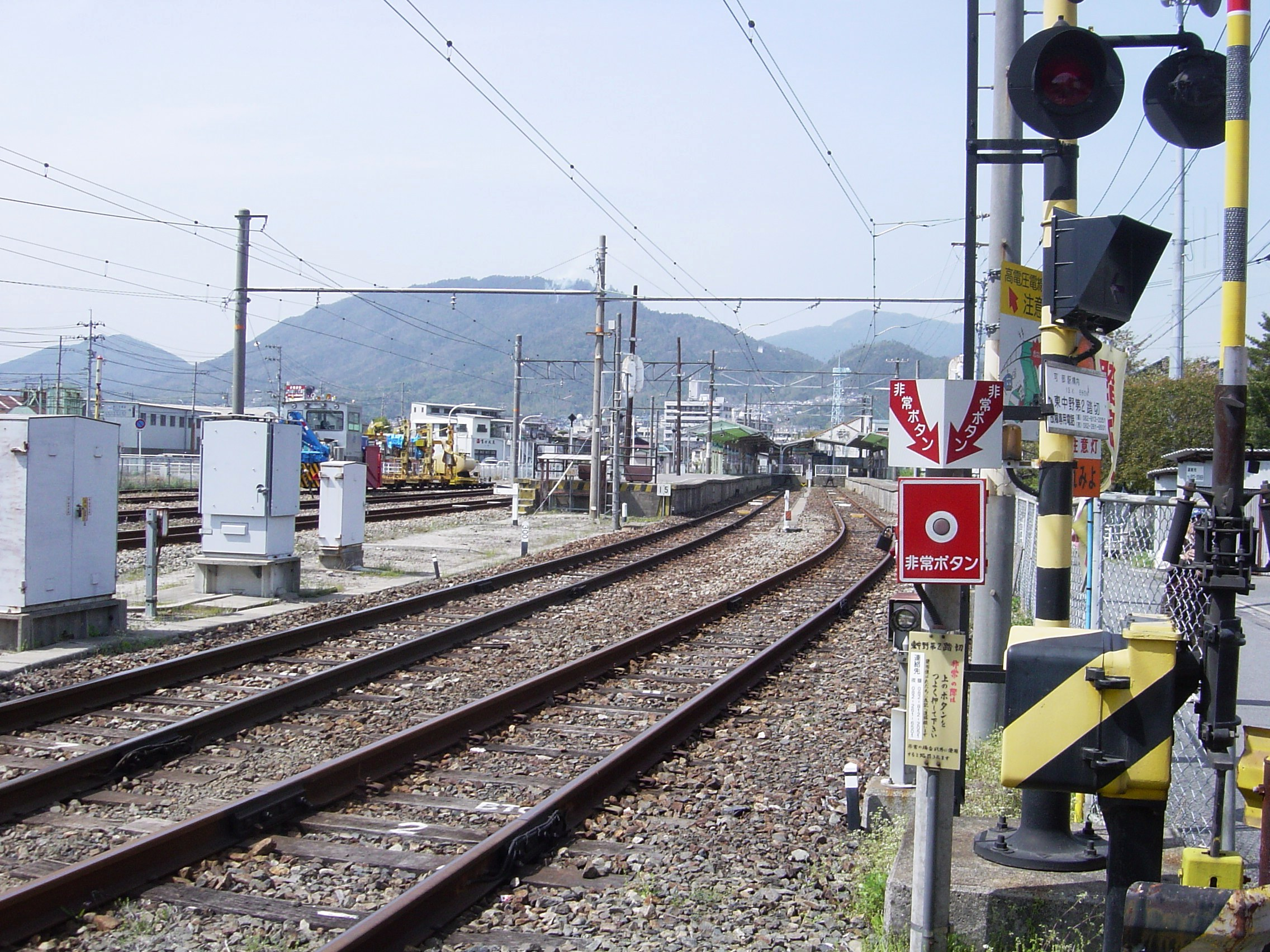
Looking toward the station building on the grounds of Kabe Station in April 2005

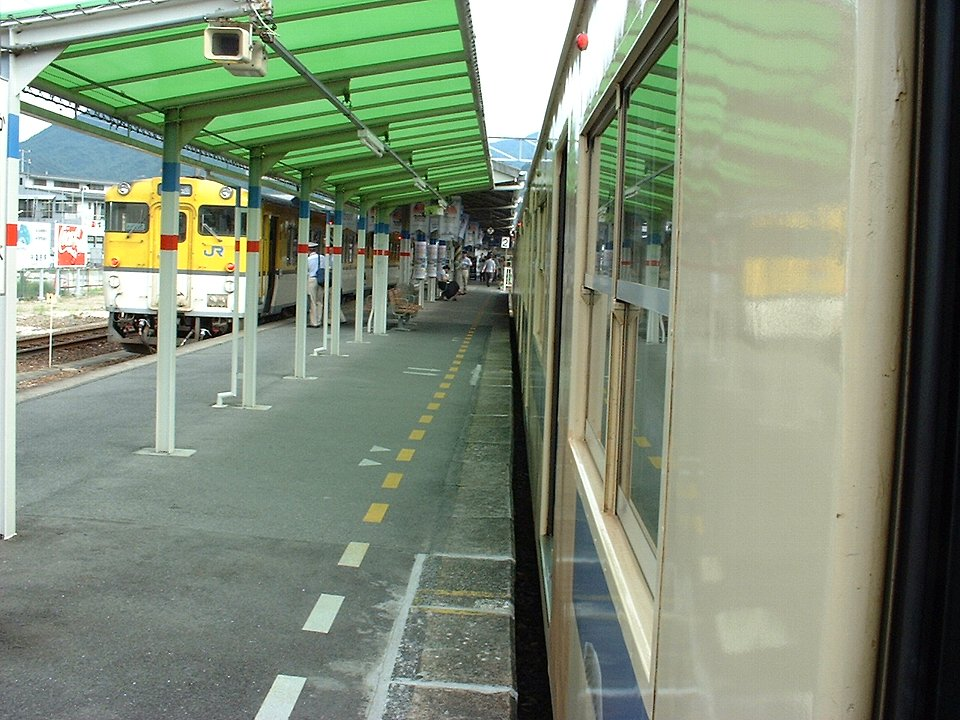
Platform of Kabe Station in August 2003

Kabe Station has two side platforms handling two tracks. Before the extension to Aki-Kameyama Station, the station handled three tracks. Tracks one and two were bay platforms, and handled trains heading towards Hiroshima Station. The third track was bidirectional, and also led towards the abandoned portion of the Kabe line.

=== Platforms ===
1	■ Kabe Line	for Hiroshima
2	■ Kabe Line	for Aki-Kameyama

=== Toilet facilities ===
Prior to 2006, a unisex restroom was located outside the station before passing through the ticket gates. While the station is within the city of Hiroshima, this restroom featured a pit-style toilet which had to be pumped regularly in order to remove the accumulated waste. The station had developed somewhat of a bad reputation because of this due to the lingering odor. This issue was resolved in 2006 with the replacement of gender-specific restrooms featuring standard flush toilets connected to the city's sewer system.

== History ==
- 1911-07-13: Kobe Station opens
- 1919-03-11: The station becomes part of Kabe Railroad
- 1926-05-01: Kabe Railroad merges with Hiroshima Denki and the station ownership is transferred with the merger
- 1928-11-09: Service from Furuichibashi Station is suspended while track electrification takes place, buses handles service during this time
- 1929-12-02: Service begins again after the completion of the electrification work
- 1931-07-01: The station becomes part of Kōhama Railway
- 1935-12-01: The station is renamed Kōhama Kabe Station
- 1936-09-01: The station is renamed Kabe Station when it is nationalized
- 1936-10-13: The line between Aki-Imuro Station and Kabe Station is opened, making Kabe Station an intermediate station
- 1987-04-01: Japanese National Railways is privatized, and Kabe Station becomes a JR West station
- 2003-12-01: Service on the 46.2 km non-electrified rail line segment from Kabe Station to Sandankyō Station is suspended, making Kabe Station the terminal station of the Kabe Line
- 2017-03-04: Kabe Station ceases to be the terminus of the Kabe Line after a 1.6 km electrified extension to Aki-Kameyama opens, platform three closes

== Surrounding area ==
- National Route 54
- Hiroshima Municipal Kabe Minami Elementary School
- Hiroshima Municipal Kabe High School
- Hiroshima Bunkyo Women's University
- Kabe Station Entrance Bus Station
- Kabe Driving School
- Kabe Public Employment Office
- Doi Clinic
- Ōta River
- JR West Geibi Line Shimofukawa Station is located 1.5 km southwest

== See also ==
- List of railway stations in Japan
