= Hiroshima Bunkyo University =

Private university in Asakita, Hiroshima, Japan

Coordinates: 34°30′19″N 132°31′12″E

Hiroshima Bunkyo University (広島文教大学, Hiroshima bunkyō daigaku) is a private university in Asakita, Hiroshima, Japan. The predecessor of the school was founded in 1948 by Miki Takeda. It was chartered as a junior women's college in 1962 and became a four-year college in 1966. In 2019, the university became fully coeducational.

The university has two faculties consisting of six departments:

Faculty of Education:

- Primary Education Department
- Secondary Education Department

Faculty of Human Services:

- Welfare Department
- Psychology Department
- Nutrition Department
- Global Communication Department

In addition, the university has the Bunkyo English Communication Center (BECC), which operates in cooperation with all departments. The BECC arranges all native-speaker English courses and houses the Self-Access Learning Center (SALC), with Learning Advisors and administrative staff to support student English skill development.
