= Asakita-ku =

Ward of the city of Hiroshima, Japan

Asakita-ku 安佐北区
- Ward
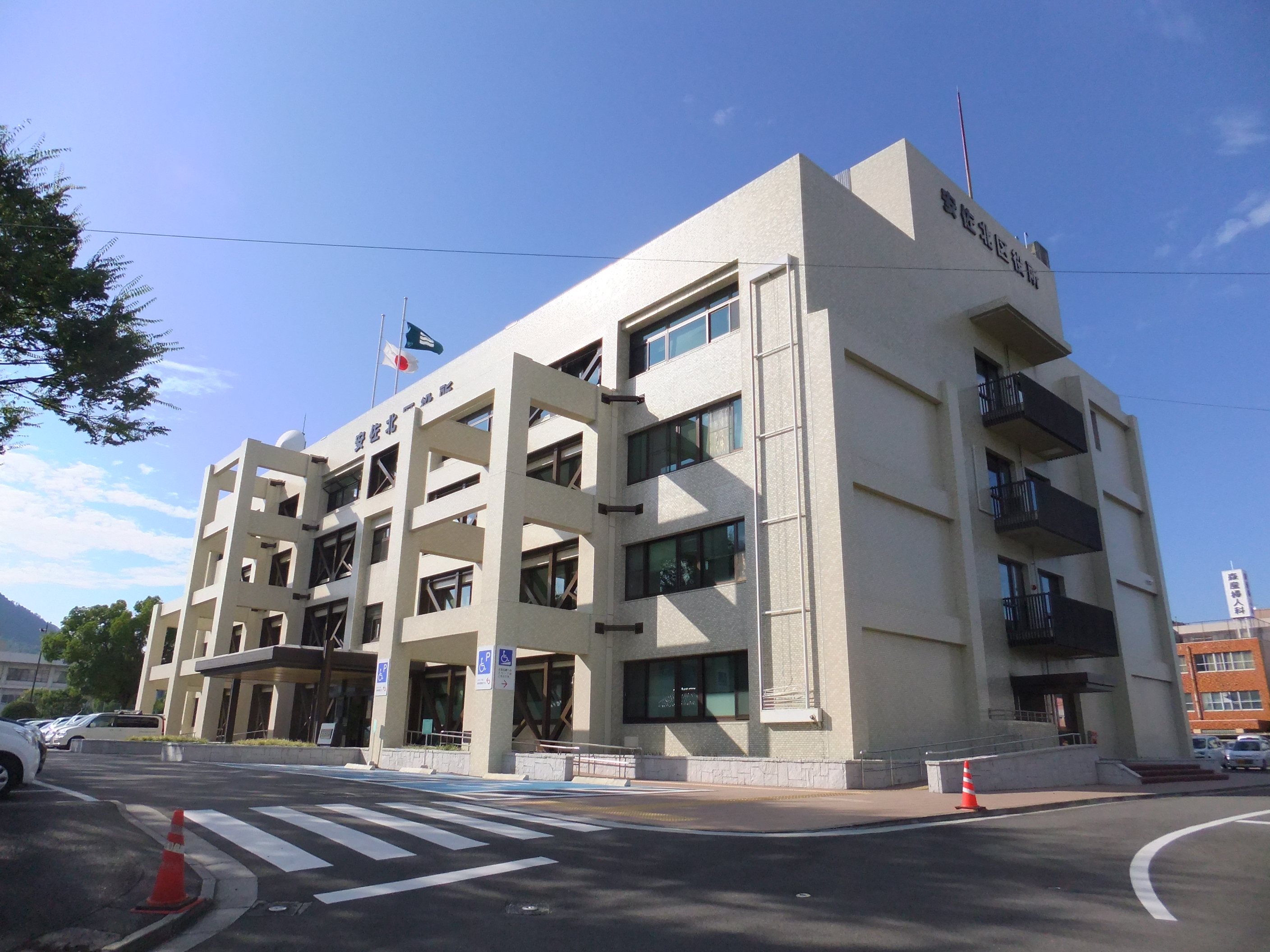
- Asakita Ward Office

- Flag Seal

- Location of Asakita-ku in Hiroshima City

- Location within Japan
- Coordinates: 34°31′6″N 132°30′28″E
- Country: Japan
- Region: Chūgoku (Sanyo)
- Prefecture: Hiroshima
- City: Hiroshima
- Established: April 1, 1980

Area
  - Total: 353.33 km^{2} (136.42 sq mi)

Population (August 1, 2026)
  - Total: 130,460
  - Density: 369/km^{2} (960/sq mi)
- Time zone: UTC+9 (Japan Standard Time)
- Postal: 731-0292
- Asakita Ward Office's Address: 4-13-13 Kabe, Asakita-ku, Hiroshima City, Hiroshima Prefecture (広島県広島市安佐北区可部四丁目13番13号)
- Website: Official site

Asakita-ku (安佐北区) is one of the eight wards of the city of Hiroshima.

The northern portion contains what was Asa-gun and southern Takata-gun, now defunct districts (see Takata District, Hiroshima). Asa-gun consisted of Kabe-cho, Kōyō-cho, Asa-cho. Takata-gun included Shiraki-cho. After the four towns were merged with Hiroshima in 1973, they were designated a ward and named Asakita-ku.

As of April 1, 2006, the ward has an estimated population of 156,516 and a density of 442.95 persons per km^{2}. The total area is 353.35 km^{2}.

The Hiroshima Bunkyo Women's College is located in Asakita-ku.

== Geography ==
=== Climate ===
Asakita-ku has a humid subtropical climate (Köppen climate classification Cfa) characterized by cool to mild winters and hot, humid summers. The average annual temperature in Asakita-ku is 14.9 °C (58.8 °F). The average annual rainfall is 1,678.3 mm (66.07 in) with July as the wettest month. The temperatures are highest on average in August, at around 27.0 °C (80.6 °F), and lowest in January, at around 3.5 °C (38.3 °F). The highest temperature ever recorded in Asakita-ku was 38.9 °C (102.0 °F) on 16 July 1994 and 3 August 2026; the coldest temperature ever recorded was −8.6 °C (16.5 °F) on 27 February 1981.

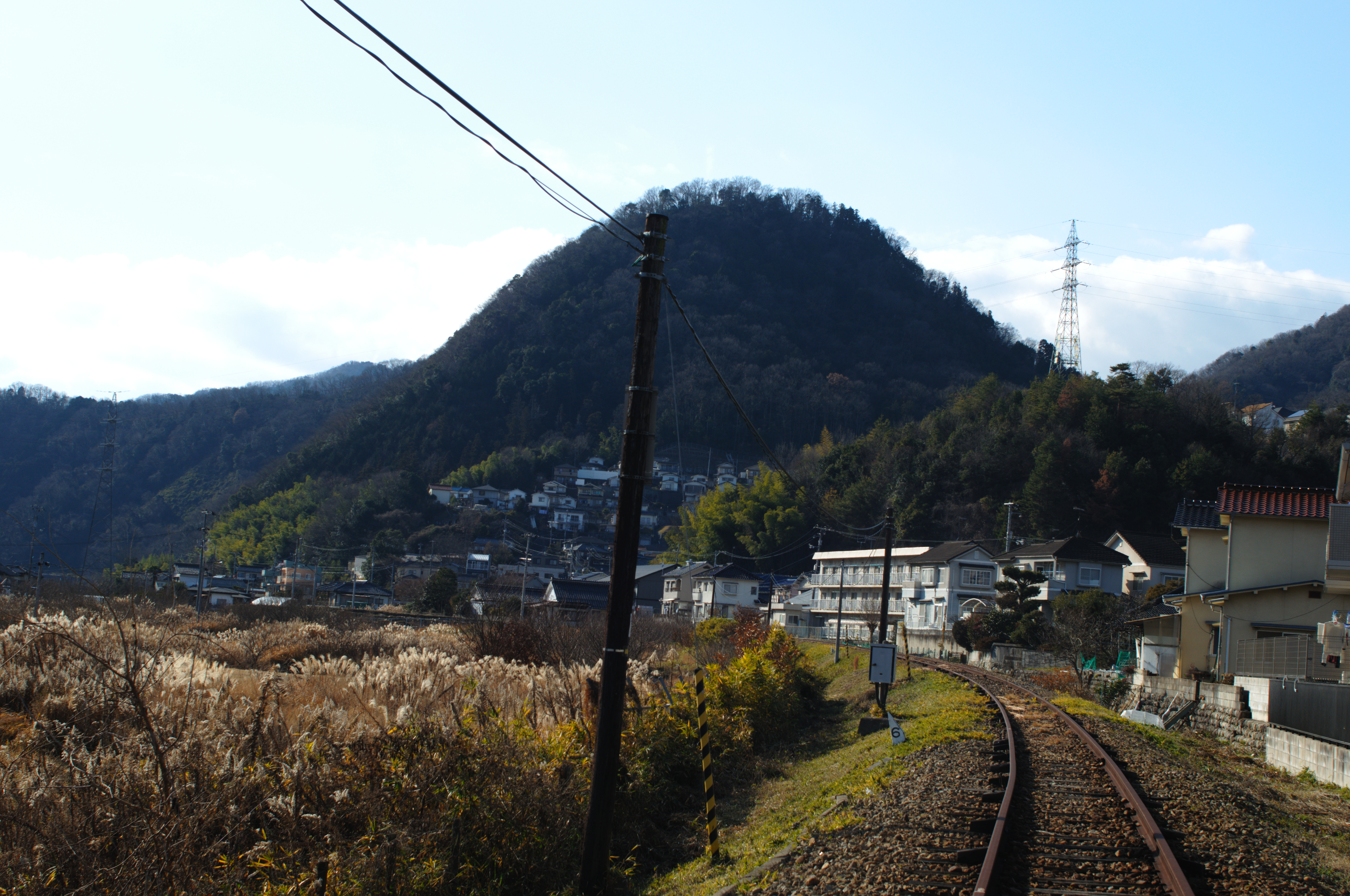
1 Chome Kameyamaminami, Asakita-ku, Hiroshima

Climate data for Asakita-ku, Hiroshima (1991−2020 normals, extremes 1979−present)
Month	Jan	Feb	Mar	Apr	May	Jun	Jul	Aug	Sep	Oct	Nov	Dec	Year
Record high °C (°F)	16.8 (62.2)	20.4 (68.7)	25.4 (77.7)	29.8 (85.6)	33.7 (92.7)	35.0 (95.0)	38.9 (102.0)	38.9 (102.0)	36.9 (98.4)	31.8 (89.2)	27.3 (81.1)	21.0 (69.8)	38.9 (102.0)
Mean daily maximum °C (°F)	8.6 (47.5)	9.8 (49.6)	13.8 (56.8)	19.7 (67.5)	24.6 (76.3)	27.3 (81.1)	30.8 (87.4)	32.5 (90.5)	28.5 (83.3)	22.9 (73.2)	16.7 (62.1)	10.8 (51.4)	20.5 (68.9)
Daily mean °C (°F)	3.5 (38.3)	4.4 (39.9)	7.8 (46.0)	13.3 (55.9)	18.2 (64.8)	22.1 (71.8)	26.0 (78.8)	27.0 (80.6)	22.9 (73.2)	16.8 (62.2)	10.8 (51.4)	5.5 (41.9)	14.9 (58.7)
Mean daily minimum °C (°F)	−0.5 (31.1)	−0.1 (31.8)	2.5 (36.5)	7.3 (45.1)	12.5 (54.5)	17.7 (63.9)	22.2 (72.0)	22.8 (73.0)	18.7 (65.7)	12.0 (53.6)	6.1 (43.0)	1.4 (34.5)	10.2 (50.4)
Record low °C (°F)	−8.1 (17.4)	−8.6 (16.5)	−5.0 (23.0)	−1.2 (29.8)	3.2 (37.8)	8.8 (47.8)	14.8 (58.6)	15.3 (59.5)	8.0 (46.4)	1.7 (35.1)	−2.7 (27.1)	−6.0 (21.2)	−8.6 (16.5)
Average precipitation mm (inches)	61.5 (2.42)	73.6 (2.90)	122.0 (4.80)	138.7 (5.46)	170.0 (6.69)	224.2 (8.83)	294.5 (11.59)	159.7 (6.29)	184.6 (7.27)	105.9 (4.17)	71.4 (2.81)	72.4 (2.85)	1,678.3 (66.07)
Average precipitation days (≥ 1.0 mm)	9.1	9.6	10.7	9.3	9.1	11.6	11.8	9.4	9.3	6.9	7.2	10.1	114.1
Mean monthly sunshine hours	105.3	119.3	159.1	184.2	200.4	137.6	152.4	189.9	152.8	166.6	135.9	110.3	1,813
Source: Japan Meteorological Agency

=== Demographics ===
Historical population
Year	Pop.	±%
1980	113,238	—
1985	131,211	+15.9%
1990	144,745	+10.3%
1995	154,079	+6.4%
2000	156,387	+1.5%
2005	152,716	−2.3%
2010	149,633	−2.0%
2015	145,018	−3.1%
