= Aki-Kameyama Station =

Railway station in Hiroshima, Japan

B 16 Aki-Kameyama Station あき亀山駅
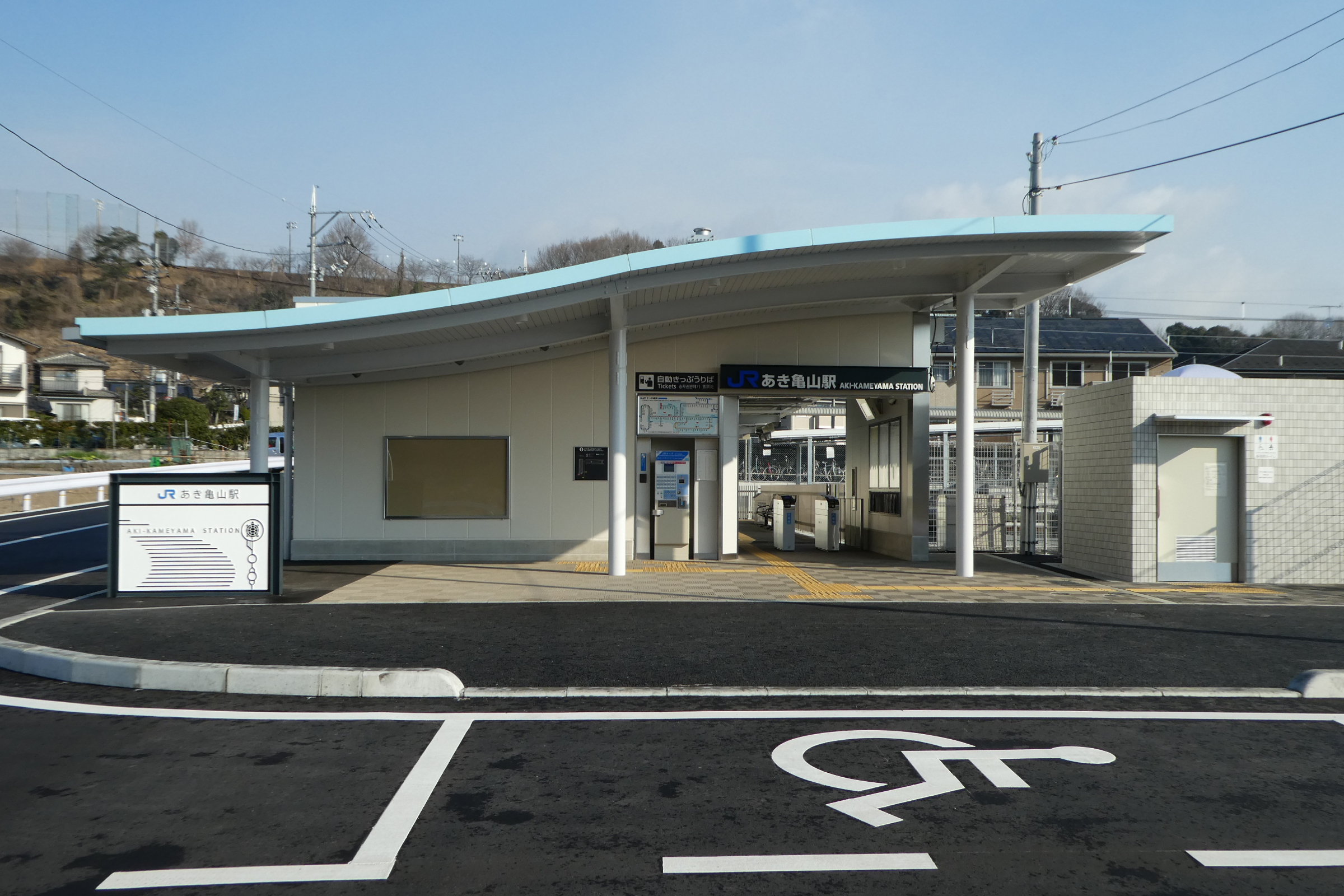
- Aki-Kameyama Station in March 2017

General information
- Location: 1-1-1 Kameyama-minami, Asakita Ward, Hiroshima City, Hiroshima Prefecture; Japan
- Coordinates: 34.517264°N 132.4959°E
- Operator: JR West
- Line: B Kabe Line

Other information
- Website: Official website

History
- Opened: March 4, 2017; 9 years ago

Passengers
- 1,240 daily (FY2021)

Services
Preceding station	JR West	Following station
Terminus	Kabe Line	Kōdo-Homachigawa B 15 towards Hiroshima
Location
- Location within Japan

Aki-Kameyama Station (あき亀山駅, Aki-Kameyama-eki) is a train station in Asakita-ku, Hiroshima on the Kabe Line operated by West Japan Railway Company (JR West). The station opened on March 4, 2017, but is at a different location than Aki-Kameyama Station (with different Japanese script) which closed in 2003.

== Lines ==
The station is the terminus of the Kabe Line.

== Station Layout ==
An aboveground station with a bay platform and 2 tracks. On the south side of Platform 2, there are two electrified storage lines, and on the south side, there is one more unnelectrified side line. There is only one signal in the hall of this station, and a course indicator is installed below it, and the track number that can be entered is displayed in numbers.

The station is barrier-free and has no stairs between ticket gates and platforms.

=== Platforms ===
Platform	Line	Destination
1・2	B Kabe Line	Yokogawa・Hiroshima

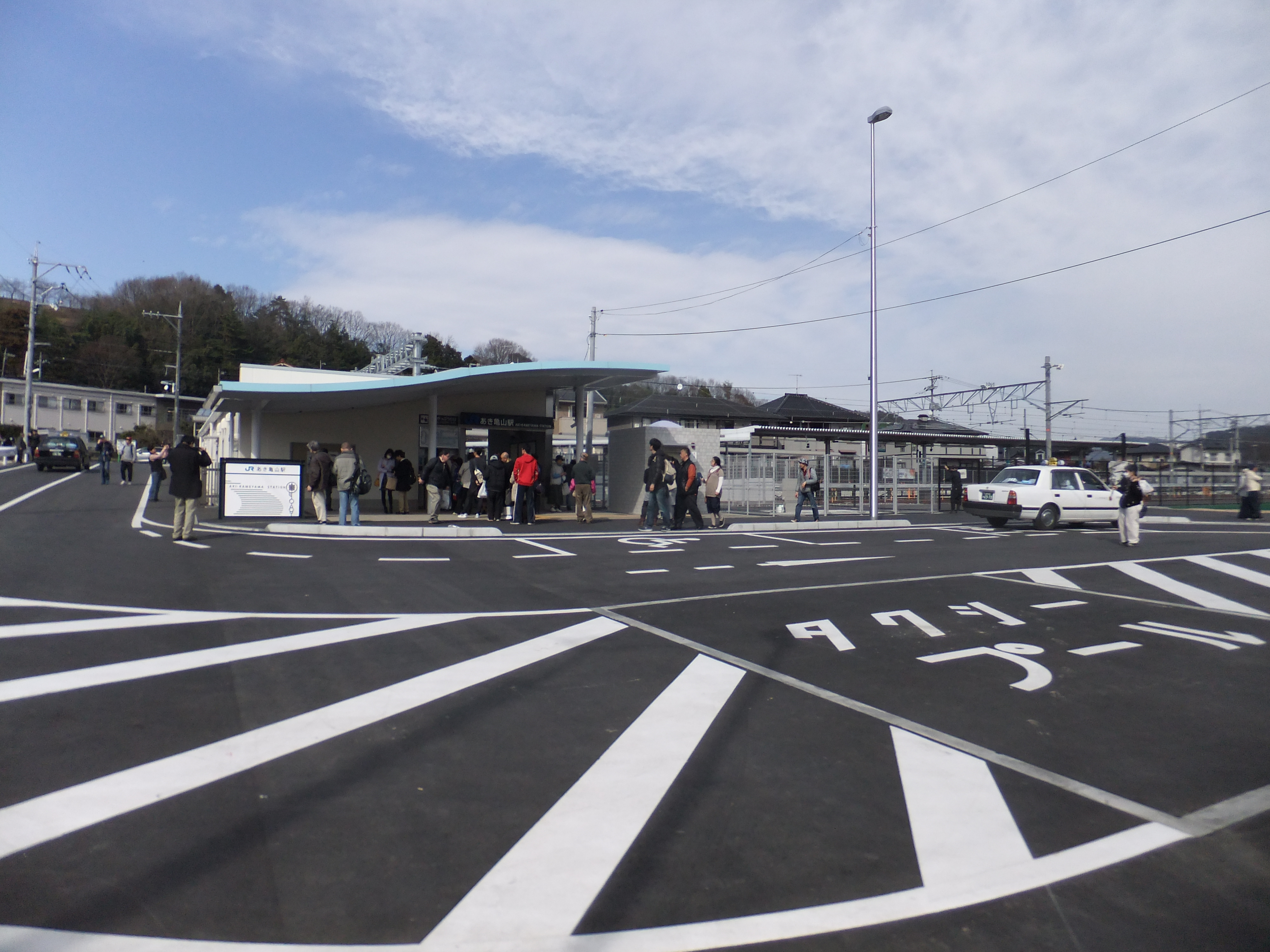
View of the station from outside（March 2017）

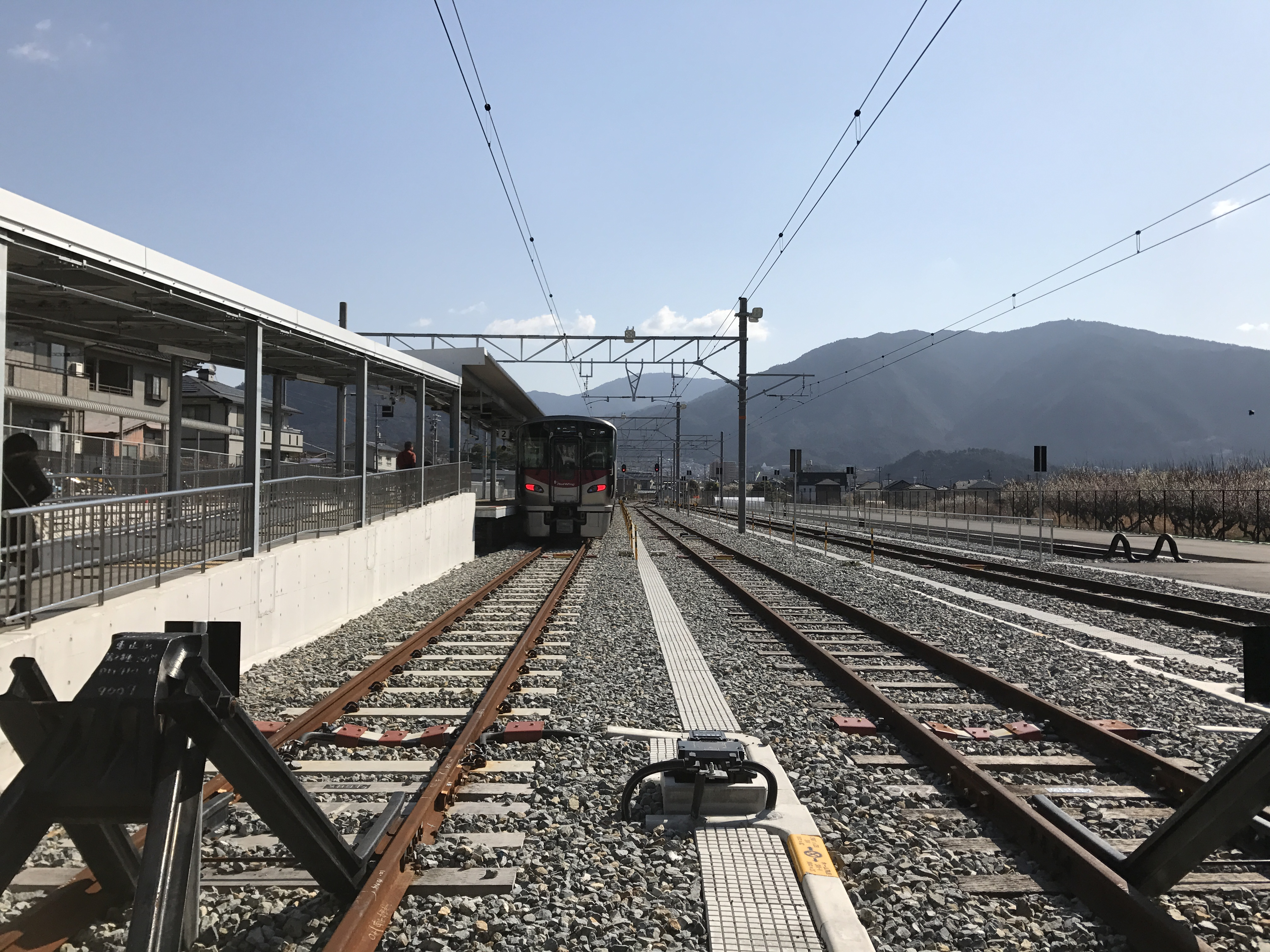
Platforms（March 2017）

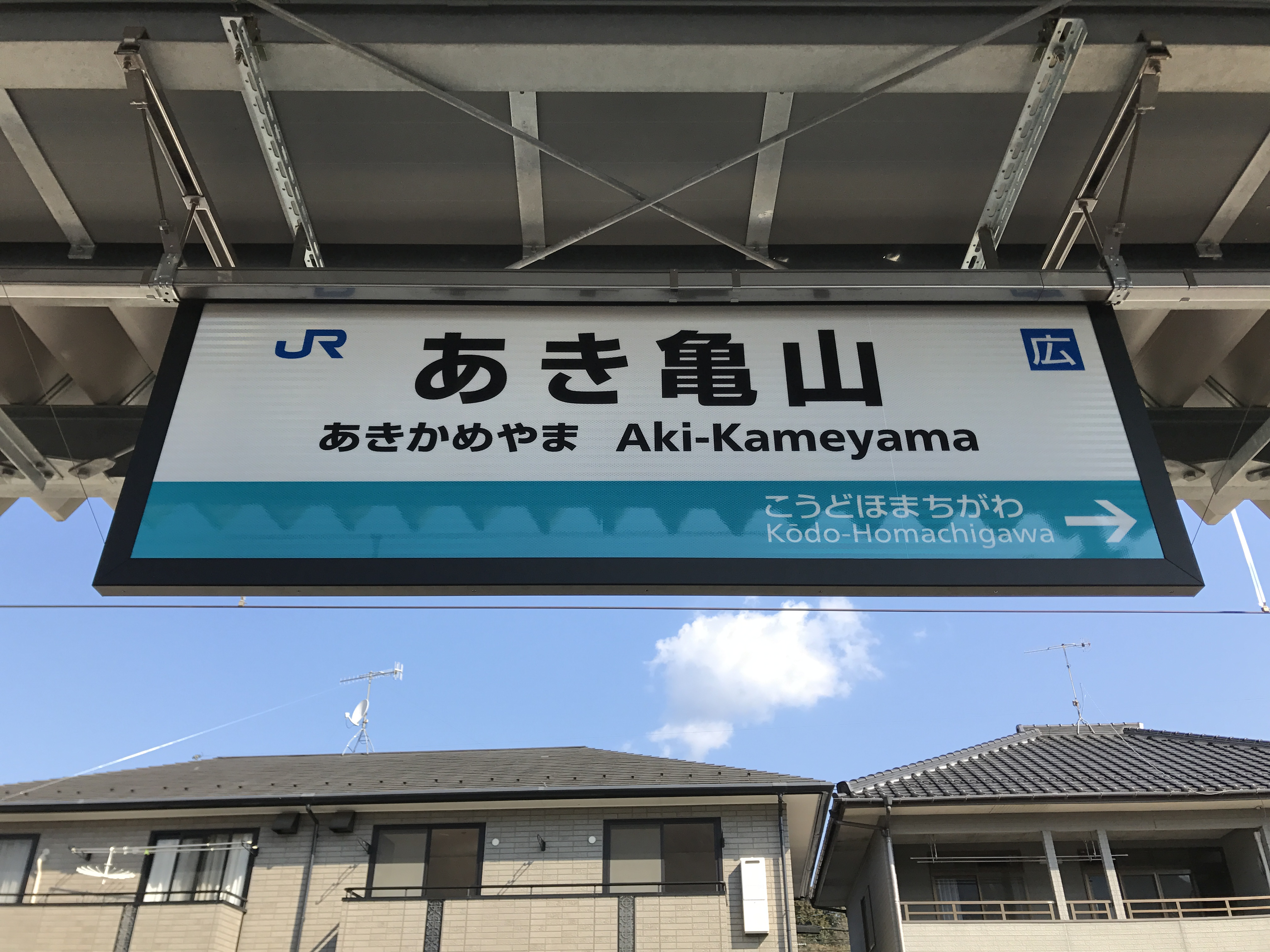
Station sign（March 2017）

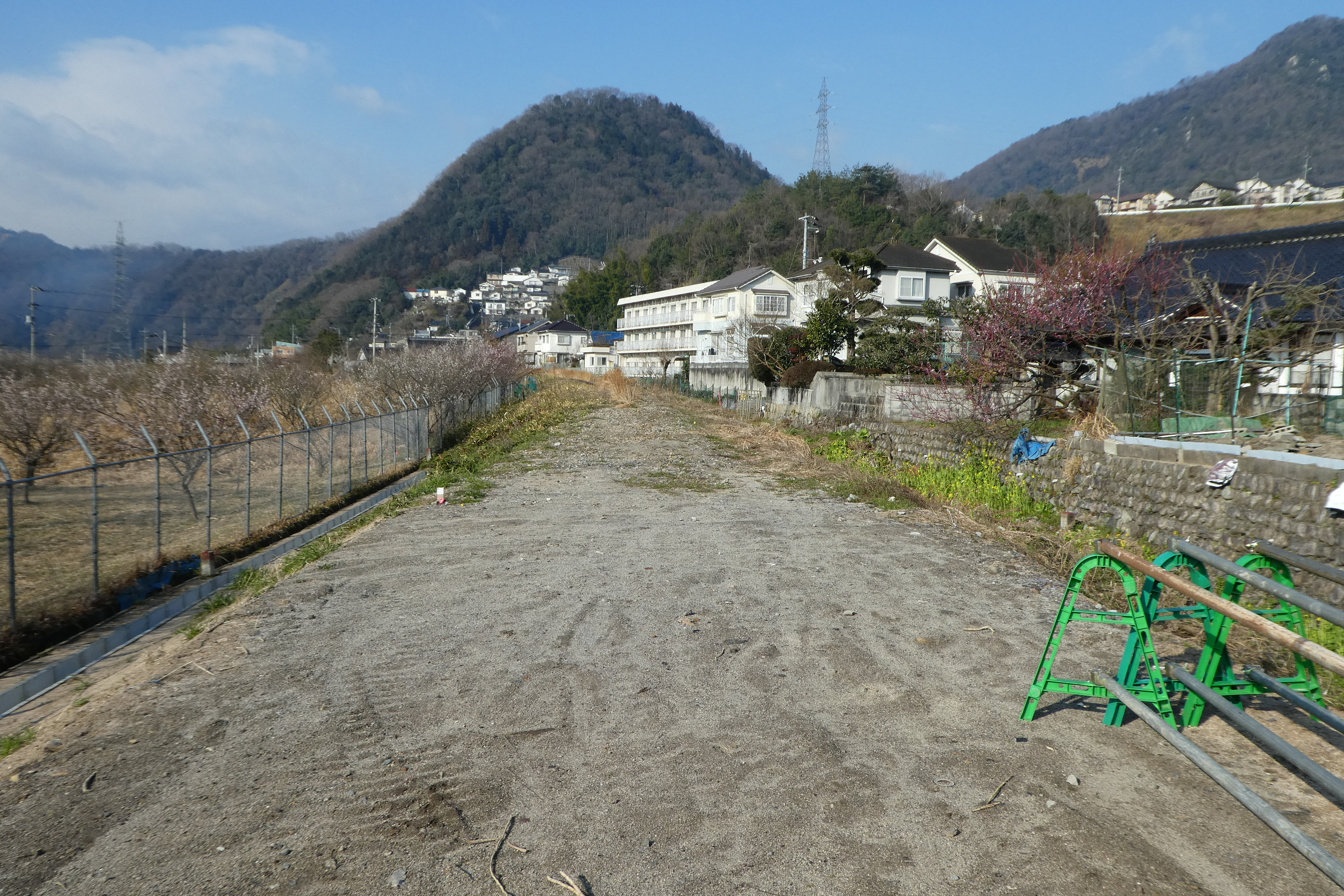
Abandoned line leading to Sandankyō Station（March 2017）

== History ==
The station opened on March 4, 2017, when the 1.6 kilometer section of the line from Kabe Station to Aki-Kameyama Station reopened after the closure in 2003.

== Passenger statistics ==
The station is used by an average of 1240 passengers daily.

== See also ==
- List of railway stations in Japan
