= Japan National Route 54 =

National highway in Japan

National Route 54
- 国道54号

Route information
- Length: 174.5 km (108.4 mi)
- Existed: 1 April 1963–present

Major junctions
- North end: National Route 9 in Matsue
- South end: National Route 2 in Naka-ku, Hiroshima

Location
- Country: Japan

Highway system
- National highways of Japan; Expressways of Japan
← National Route 53	→ National Route 55

National Route 54 is a national highway of Japan connecting Naka-ku, Hiroshima and Matsue.

== History ==
Route 54 was originally designated on 18 May 1953 as National Route 182, and this was redesignated as Route 54 when the route was promoted to a Class 1 highway.

== Route data ==
- Length: 174.5 km (108.43 mi).
