= Yatsugi Station =

Railway station in Miyoshi, Hiroshima Prefecture, Japan

Yatsugi Station 八次駅
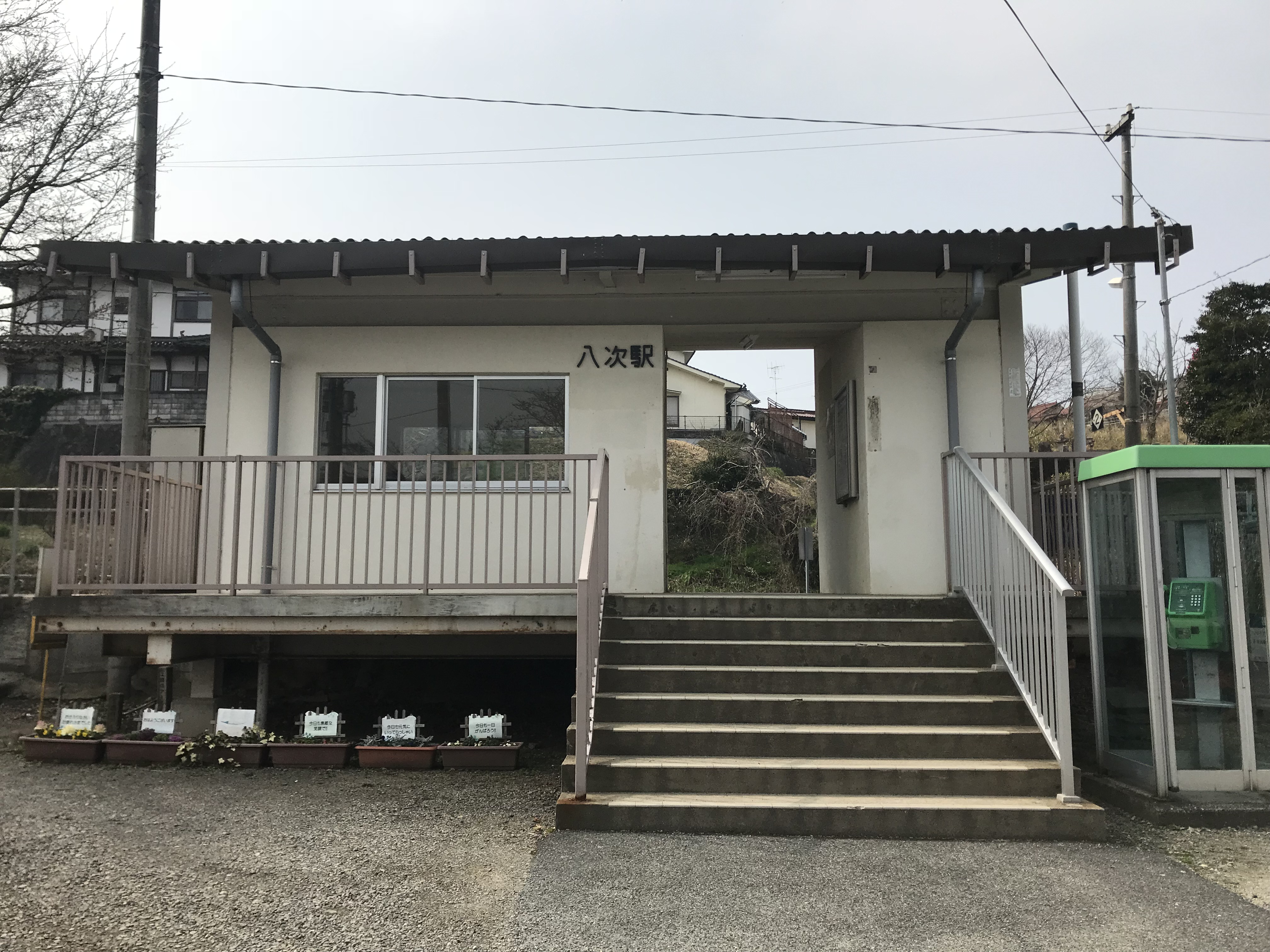
- Yatsugi Station, March 2018

General information
- Location: 140 Minamihatajikimachi, Miyoshi-shi, Hiroshima-ken 728-0017; Japan
- Coordinates: 34°48′8.55″N 132°52′44.08″E
- Owner: West Japan Railway Company
- Operator: West Japan Railway Company
- Lines: P Geibi Line; Z Geibi Line
- Distance: 88.0 km (54.7 miles) from Bitchū-Kōjiro
- Platforms: 1 side platform
- Tracks: 2
- Connections: Bus stop

Construction
- Accessible: Yes

Other information
- Status: Unstaffed
- Website: Official website

History
- Opened: 7 June 1922

Passengers
- FY2019: 99

Services
Preceding station	JR West	Following station
Miyoshi towards Hiroshima	Geibi Line Local	Kamisugi towards Niimi
Miyoshi Terminus	Fukuen Line Local	Kamisugi towards Fukuyama
Location
- Location within Hiroshima Prefecture Location within Japan

Yatsugi Station (八次駅, Yatsugi-eki) is a passenger railway station located in the city of Miyoshi, Hiroshima Prefecture, Japan. It is operated by the West Japan Railway Company (JR West).

== Lines ==
Yatsugi Station is served by the JR West Geibi Line, and is located 88.0 kilometers from the terminus of the line at Bitchū-Kōjiro and 94.4 kilometers from Niimi. Trains of the Fukuen Line also continue past the nominal terminal of the line at Shiomachi using the Geibi Line tracks to terminate at Miyoshi.

== Station layout ==
The station consists of one side platform serving a single bi-directional track. There is no station building, but only a waiting room directly on the platform. The station is unattended. Formerly, tickets could be purchased at a shop in front of the station.

== History ==
Yatsugi Station was opened on 7 June 1922. With the privatization of the Japanese National Railways (JNR) on 1 April 1987, the station came under the control of JR West.

== Passenger statistics ==
In fiscal 2019, the station was used by an average of 99 passengers daily.

== Surrounding area ==
- Miyoshi Municipal Hachiji Elementary School
- Miyoshi Municipal Hachiji Junior High School
- Hiroshima Prefectural Miyoshi High School
- Mazda Miyoshi Proving Ground
- Japan National Route 183
- Japan National Route 184

== See also ==
- List of railway stations in Japan
