= Kamisugi Station (Hiroshima) =

Railway station in Miyoshi, Hiroshima Prefecture, Japan

Kamisugi Station 神杉駅
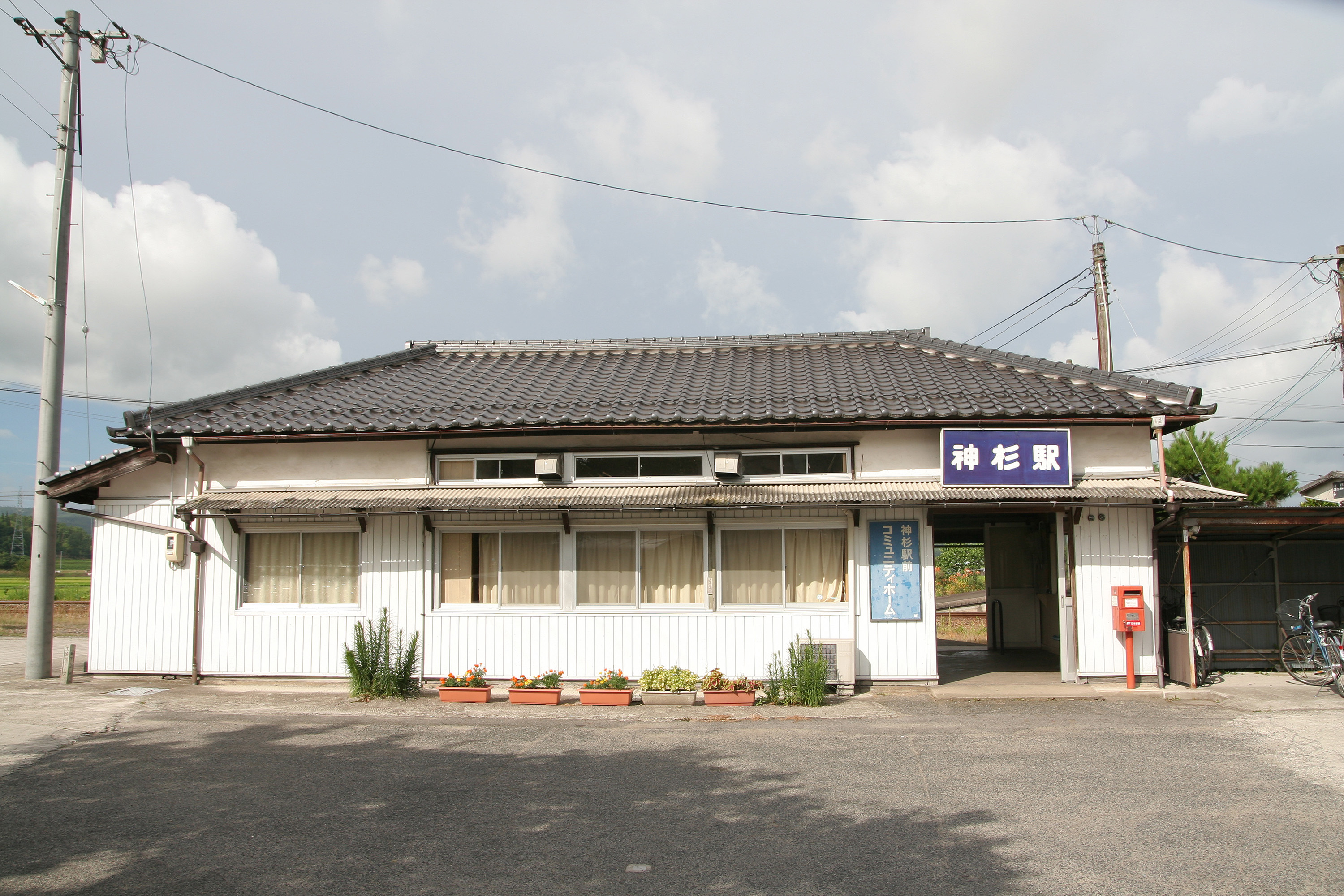
- Kamisugi Station, July 2008

General information
- Location: 1241 Takasugi-chō, Miyoshi-shi, Hiroshima-ken; Japan
- Coordinates: 34°46′51.7″N 132°54′9.22″E
- Owner: West Japan Railway Company
- Operator: West Japan Railway Company
- Lines: P Geibi Line; Z Fukuen Line
- Distance: 84.7 km (52.6 miles) from Bitchū-Kōjiro
- Platforms: 1 island platform
- Tracks: 2
- Connections: Bus stop

Construction
- Accessible: Yes

Other information
- Status: Unstaffed
- Website: Official website

History
- Opened: 7 June 1922
- Former names: Shiomachi (to 1934)

Passengers
- FY2019: 9

Services
Preceding station	JR West	Following station
Yatsugi towards Hiroshima	Geibi Line Local	Shiomachi towards Niimi
Yatsugi towards Miyoshi	Fukuen Line Local	Shiomachi towards Fukuyama
Location
- Location within Hiroshima Prefecture Location within Japan

Kamisugi Station (神杉駅, Kamisugi-eki) is a passenger railway station located in the city of Miyoshi, Hiroshima Prefecture, Japan. It is operated by the West Japan Railway Company (JR West).

== Lines ==
Kamisugi Station is served by the JR West Geibi Line, and is located 84.7 kilometers from the terminus of the line at Bitchū-Kōjiro and 91.1 kilometers from Niimi. Trains of the Fukuen Line also continue past the nominal terminal of the line at Shiomachi using the Geibi Line tracks to terminate at Miyoshi.

== Station layout ==
The station consists of one island platform connected to a wooden station building by a level crossing. The station is unattended.The station previously handled freight as well as passenger trains in its large yard.

=== Platforms ===
1	■ P Geibi Line	for Bingo-Shōbara and Bingo-Ochiai
1	■ Z Fukuen Line	for Jōge and Fuchū
2	■ P Geibi Line	for Miyoshi
2	■ Z Fukuen Line	for Miyoshi

== History ==
Kamisugi Station was opened on 7 June 1922 as Shiomachi Station (塩町駅). It was renamed on 1 January 1934. With the privatization of the Japanese National Railways (JNR) on 1 April 1987, the station came under the control of JR West.

== Passenger statistics ==
In fiscal 2019, the station was used by an average of 8 passengers daily.

== Surrounding area ==
- Miyoshi Municipal Kansugi Elementary School
- Miyoshi Fudoki Hill - Hiroshima Prefectural Museum of History and Folklore
- Jinyama Tumulus Cluster
- Japan National Route 184
- Japan National Route 375

== See also ==
- List of railway stations in Japan
