= Mirasaka Station =

Railway station in Miyoshi, Hiroshima Prefecture, Japan

Mirasaka Station 三良坂駅
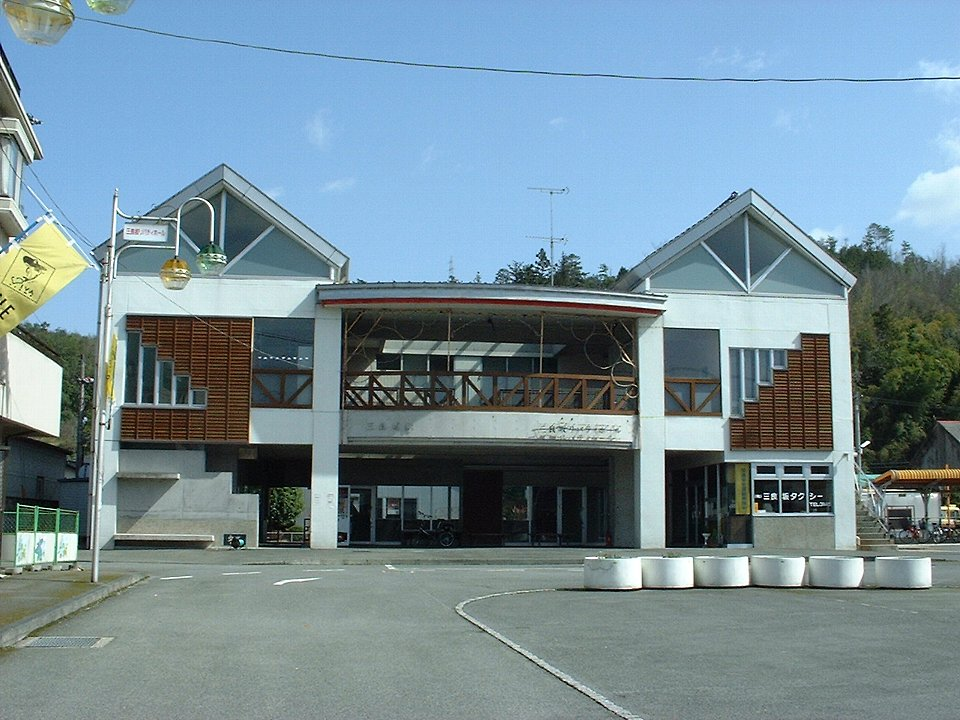
- Mirasaka Station, July 2008

General information
- Location: 989-2 Mirasaka, Mirasaka-chō, Miyoshi-shi, Hiroshima-ken 729-4304; Japan
- Coordinates: 34°45′58.17″N 132°57′27.21″E
- Owner: West Japan Railway Company
- Operator: West Japan Railway Company
- Line: Z Fukuen Line
- Distance: 73.6 km (45.7 miles) from Fukuyama
- Platforms: 1 side platform
- Tracks: 1
- Connections: Bus stop

Construction
- Structure type: Ground level
- Accessible: Yes

Other information
- Status: Unstaffed
- Website: Official website

History
- Opened: 15 November 1933

Passengers
- FY2019: 40

Services
Preceding station	JR West	Following station
Shiomachi towards Miyoshi	Fukuen Line Local	Kisa towards Fukuyama
Location
- Location within Hiroshima Prefecture Location within Japan

Mirasaka Station (三良坂駅, Mirasaka-eki) is a passenger railway station located in the city of Miyoshi, Hiroshima Prefecture, Japan. It is operated by the West Japan Railway Company (JR West).

== Lines ==
Mirasaka Station is served by the JR West Fukuen Line, and is located 73.6 kilometers from the terminus of the line at Fukuyama.

== Station layout ==
The station consists of one side platform serving a single bi-directional track. It originally was constructed with two opposed side platforms, and the remains of the abolished platform remain in situ. The station building has two floors, with rest rooms and taxi company offices on the first floor, and a multipurpose hall on the second floor. However, as a passenger station, it is unattended.

== History ==
Mirasaka Station was opened on 15 November 1933. With the privatization of the Japanese National Railways (JNR) on 1 April 1987, the station came under the control of JR West.

== Passenger statistics ==
In fiscal 2019, the station was used by an average of 40 passengers daily.

== Surrounding area ==
- Miyoshi City Hall Mirasaka office
- Japan National Route 184

== See also ==
- List of railway stations in Japan
