= Akiyaguchi Station =

Railway station in Hiroshima, Japan

Akiyaguchi Station 安芸矢口駅
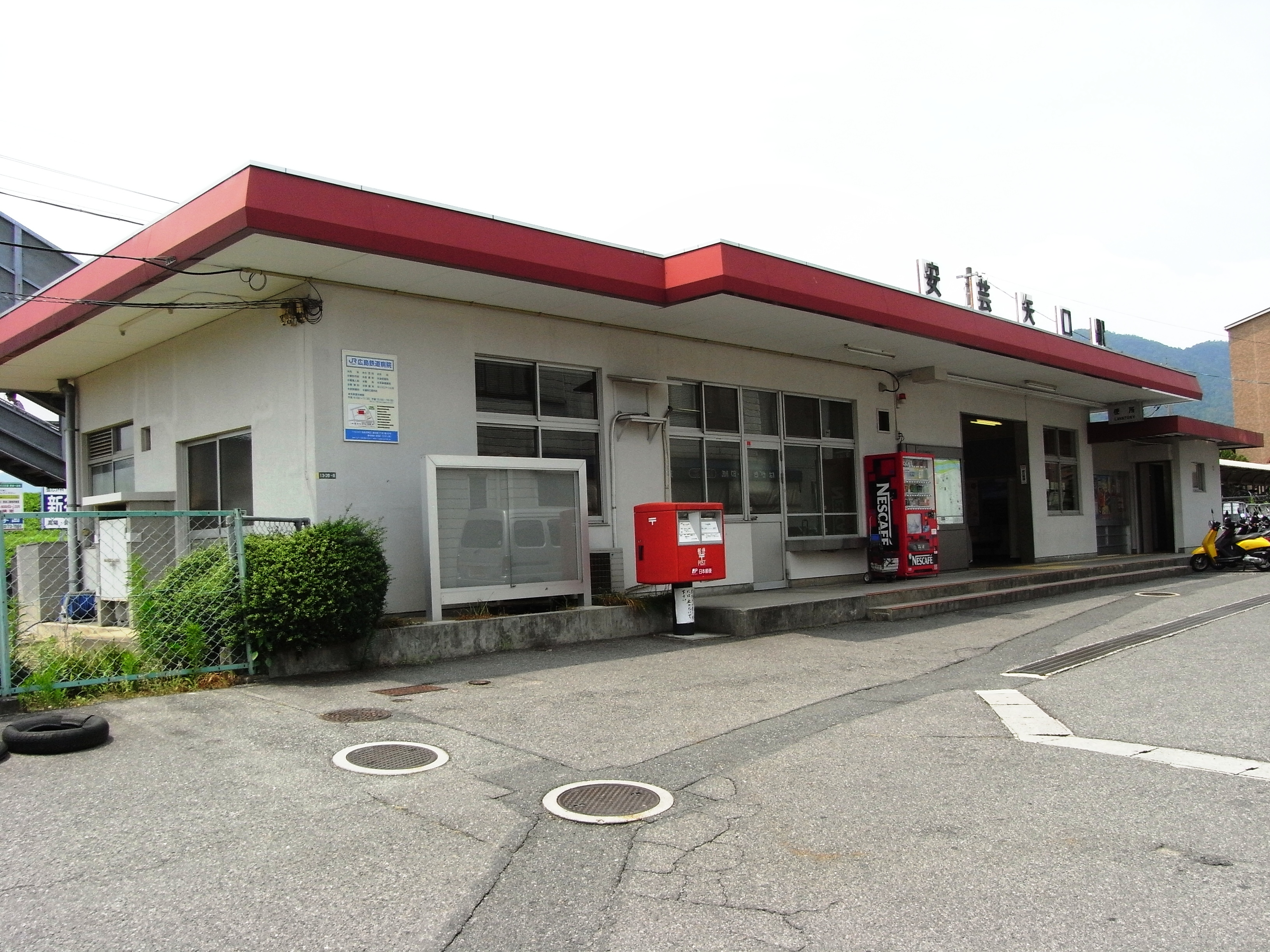
- Akiyaguchi Station building (July 13, 2008).

General information
- Location: Asakita, Hiroshima, Hiroshima; Japan
- Coordinates: 34°27′46.7″N 132°29′42.4″E
- Operator: JR West
- Line: Geibi Line

History
- Opened: April 28, 1915
- Former names: Yaguchi (until 1937)
Location

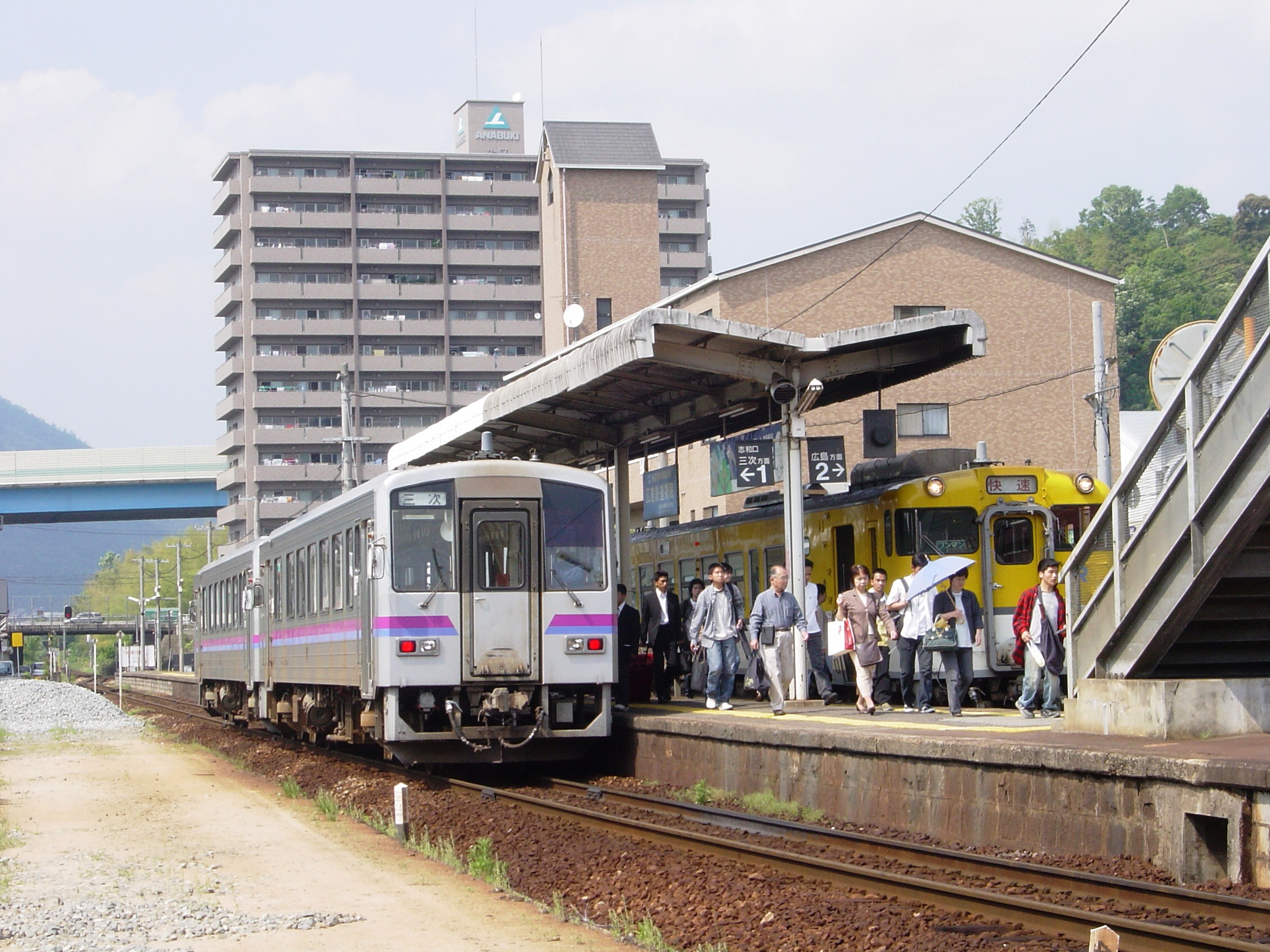
Akiyaguchi Station platform looking toward Hiroshima Station (May 15, 2005)

Akiyaguchi Station (安芸矢口駅, Akiyaguchi-eki) is a JR West Geibi Line station located in 1-chōme, Kuchita, Asakita-ku, Hiroshima, Hiroshima Prefecture, Japan. The "Aki" in the station title is from the former name of much of the current Hiroshima Prefecture.

== History ==
- 1915-04-28: Yaguchi Station opens
- 1937-07-01: The station name changes to Akiyaguchi Station
- 1987-04-01: Japanese National Railways is privatized, and Akiyaguchi Station becomes a JR West station
- 2007: Automatic ticket gates are scheduled to be installed during 2007

== Station building and platforms ==
Akiyaguchi Station features one island platform capable of handling two lines simultaneously. Trains bound for Shiwaguchi and Miyoshi are handled on the upper end (上り) of the platform, and trains bound for Hiroshima are handled on the lower end (下り). The station is operated under private contract from JR West, and has a Green Window. The Akiyaguchi Station building is a one-story concrete structure.

=== Environs ===
The area surrounding Akiyaguchi Station contains many multi-unit apartment buildings, and is considered a "bedroom community" of downtown Hiroshima City. Because of this, this station handles a high volume of passengers daily, especially in the morning and evening commuting hours on weekdays. The Ōta River is found to the west of the station, and the Asa Ōhashi, a bridge on the Sanyō Expressway, is directly north of the station.

- Suikō Apartments
- Kuchita Post Office
- Hiroshima Municipal Kuchita Junior High School
- Hiroshima Municipal Kuchita Higashi Elementary School
- Hiroshima Municipal Ochiai Elementary School
- Hiroshima Municipal Kuchita Elementary School
- Hiroshima Municipal Kawauchi Elementary School
- JR West Kabe Line Midorii Station
- JR West Kabe Line Shichikenjaya Station
- JR West Kabe Line and Hiroshima Rapid Transit Astramline Ōmachi Station
- Ōta River (太田川)

=== Highway access ===
- Sanyo Expressway Takataba Hiroshima Interchange
- Japan National Route 54
- Hiroshima Prefectural Route 37 (Hiroshima-Miyoshi Route)
- Hiroshima Prefectural Route 38 (Hiroshima-Toyohira Route)
- Hiroshima Prefectural Route 270 (Yagi-Midorii Route)
- Hiroshima Prefectural Route 271 (Yagi Route)
- Hiroshima Prefectural Route 459 (Yaguchi-Yasufuruichi Route)

== Connecting lines ==
All lines are JR West lines.

Geibi Line
Miyoshi Express (#1, 2, 5, 6, 7, 8)

No stop

Miyoshi Express (#3, 4)

Shimofukawa Station — Akiyaguchi Station — Yaga Station

Commuter Liner

No stop

Miyoshi Liner/Local

Kumura Station — Akiyaguchi Station — Hesaka Station
