= Miyoshi, Hiroshima =

Miyoshi 三次市
- City
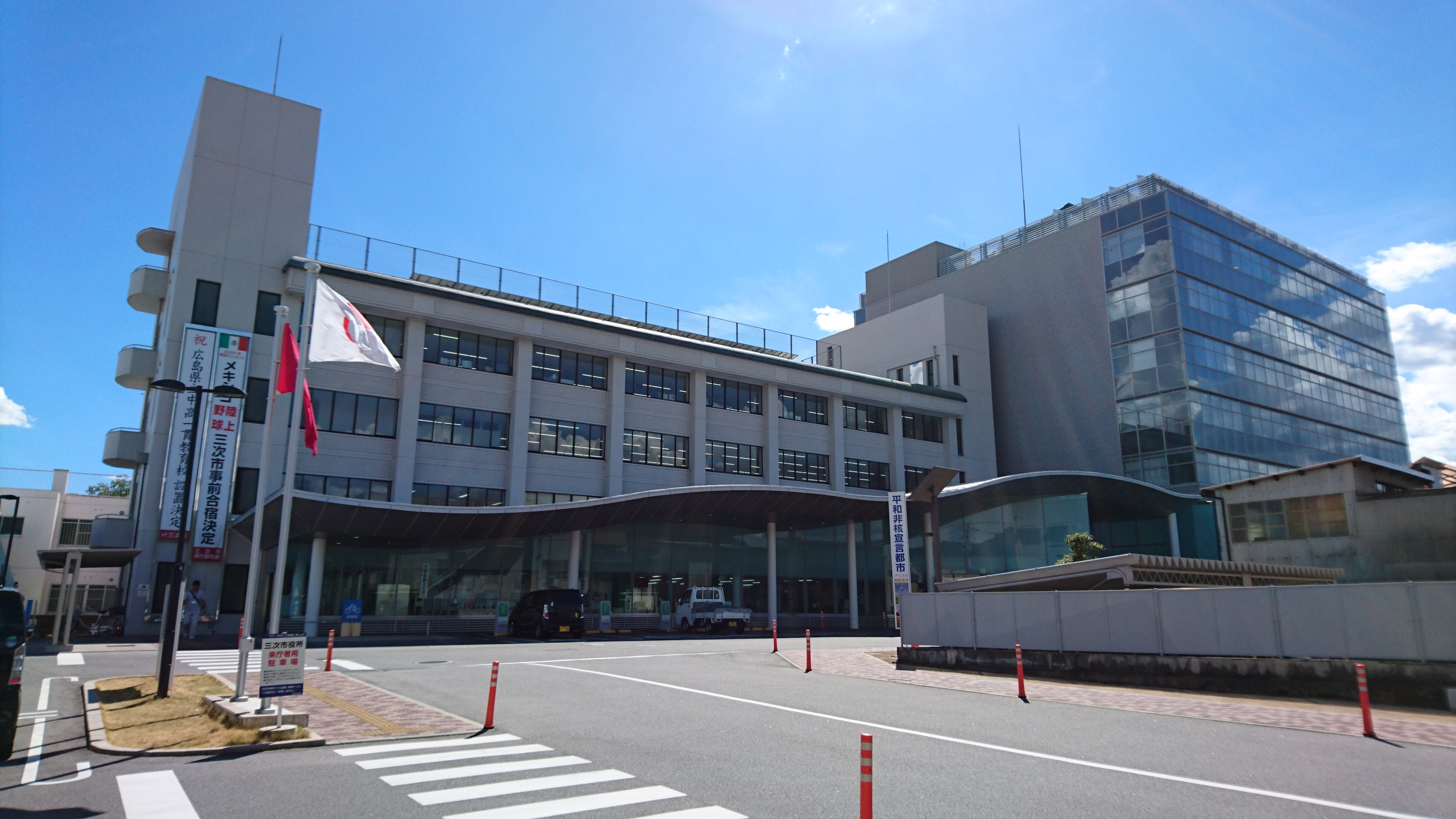
- Miyoshi City Hall

- Flag Emblem
- Interactive map of Miyoshi
- Location in Japan
- Coordinates: 34°48′N 132°51′E
- Country: Japan
- Region: Chūgoku (San'yō)
- Prefecture: Hiroshima

Government
  - Mayor: Satoshi Fukuoka

Area
  - Total: 778.14 km^{2} (300.44 sq mi)

Population (March 31, 2023)
  - Total: 49,106
  - Density: 63.107/km^{2} (163.45/sq mi)
- Time zone: UTC+09:00 (JST)
- City hall address: 2-8-1, Tōkaichi Naka, Miyoshi-shi, Hiroshima-ken 728-8501
- Climate: Cfa
- Website: www.city.miyoshi.hiroshima.jp
- Symbols
- Bird: Japanese wagtail
- Flower: Sakura
- Tree: Maple

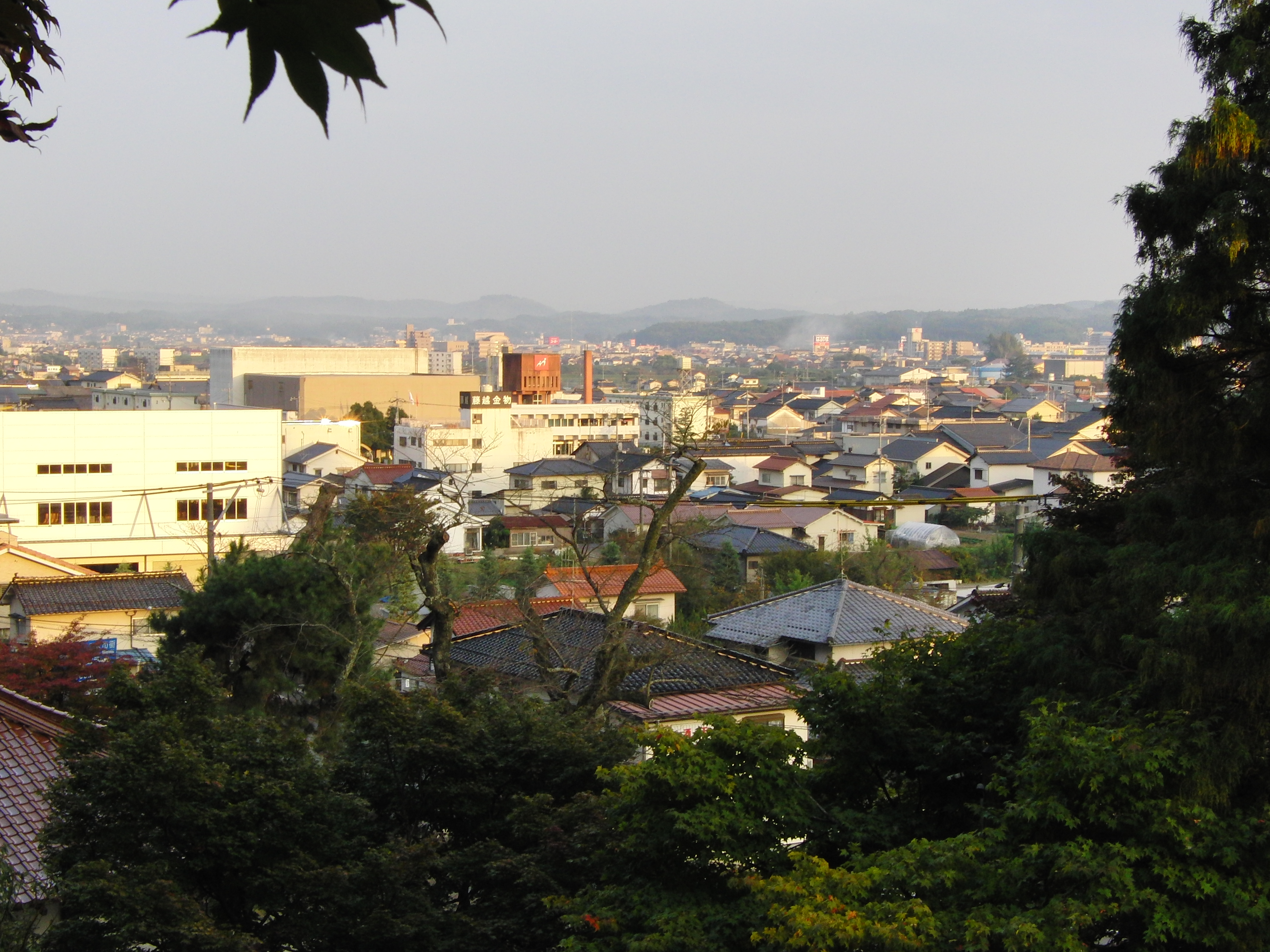
Panorama of central Miyoshi

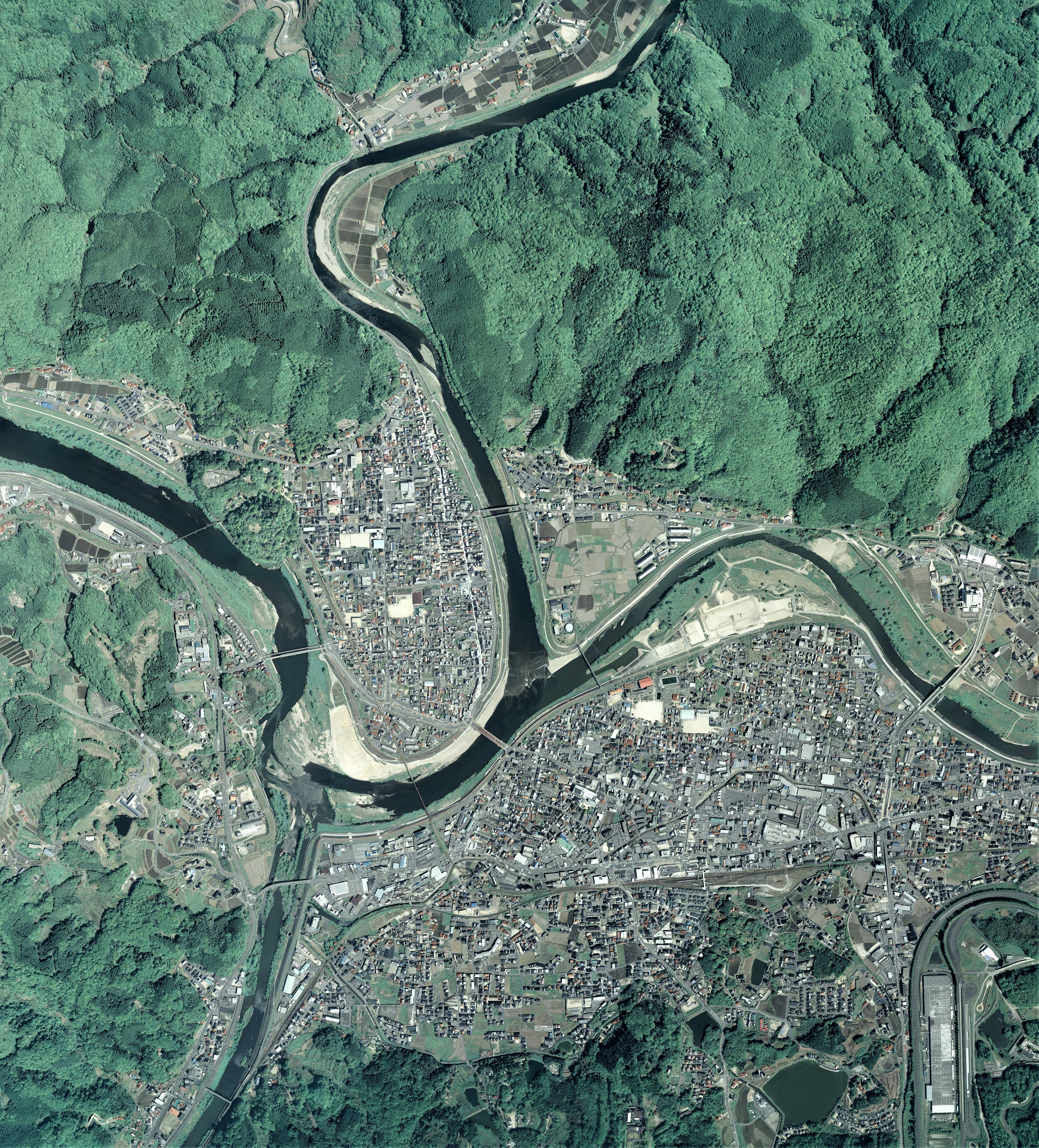
Aerial photo of central Miyoshi

Miyoshi (三次市, Miyoshi-shi) is a city located in Hiroshima Prefecture, Japan. As of 31 March 2023, the city had an estimated population of 49,106 in 23154 households and a population density of 63 persons per km^{2}. The total area of the city is 778.14 square kilometres (300.44 sq mi).

== Geography ==
Miyoshi is located almost in the middle of the Chugoku region, with the Chugoku Mountains to the north and a flat agricultural area to the south. Together with the neighboring city of Shōbara, it forms the northern part of the prefecture called the "Bihoku region". Because the tributaries of the Enokawa River meet at the Miyoshi Basin, it prospered as a river port and has long functioned as a strategic point for culture, economy, and transportation connecting the San'in and San'yō regions. About one-third of the rain that falls in Hiroshima Prefecture is collected here, and it has abundant water. Due to the confluence of rivers, fog tends to occur in this area from late autumn to early spring. The center of urban area is the Miyoshi Basin, which is located between the Chugoku Mountains and the Kibi Plateau at an elevation of 150 to 250 meters. Miyoshi developed as a twin settlement, with "Itsukaichi", as the castle town of the Miyoshi clan towards the west, and the current city center district where Miyoshi Station is located as a market town called 'Tokaichi-machi' to the east.

=== Adjoining municipalities ===
Hiroshima Prefecture

- Akitakata
- Fuchū
- Higashihiroshima
- Sera
- Shōbara

Shimane Prefecture

- Iinan
- Misato
- Ōnan

=== Demographics ===
Per Japanese census data, the population of Miyoshi in 2020 is 50,681 people. Miyoshi has been conducting censuses since 1950.

Historical population
Year	Pop.	±%
1950	93,411	—
1955	89,216	−4.5%
1960	83,030	−6.9%
1965	71,708	−13.6%
1970	65,561	−8.6%
1975	64,190	−2.1%
1980	63,582	−0.9%
1985	64,089	+0.8%
1990	63,596	−0.8%
1995	62,910	−1.1%
2000	61,635	−2.0%
2005	59,314	−3.8%
2010	56,613	−4.6%
2015	53,615	−5.3%
2020	50,681	−5.5%
Miyoshi population statistics

== Climate ==
Miyoshi has a humid subtropical climate (Köppen climate classification Cfa) characterized by cool to mild winters and hot, humid summers. The average annual temperature in Miyoshi is 13.5 °C (56.3 °F). The average annual rainfall is 1,467.0 mm (57.76 in) with July as the wettest month. The temperatures are highest on average in August, at around 25.9 °C (78.6 °F), and lowest in January, at around 1.9 °C (35.4 °F). The highest temperature ever recorded in Miyoshi was 39.1 °C (102.4 °F) on 3 August 2026; the coldest temperature ever recorded was −12.5 °C (9.5 °F) on 27 February 1981.

Climate data for Miyoshi (elevation 159 m, 1991–2020 normals, extremes 1978–present)
Month	Jan	Feb	Mar	Apr	May	Jun	Jul	Aug	Sep	Oct	Nov	Dec	Year
Record high °C (°F)	16.6 (61.9)	21.9 (71.4)	26.4 (79.5)	31.1 (88.0)	33.8 (92.8)	37.2 (99.0)	38.8 (101.8)	39.1 (102.4)	36.9 (98.4)	30.4 (86.7)	26.3 (79.3)	20.8 (69.4)	39.1 (102.4)
Mean daily maximum °C (°F)	6.8 (44.2)	8.4 (47.1)	13.0 (55.4)	19.3 (66.7)	24.3 (75.7)	27.1 (80.8)	30.6 (87.1)	32.1 (89.8)	27.6 (81.7)	21.8 (71.2)	15.5 (59.9)	9.0 (48.2)	19.6 (67.3)
Daily mean °C (°F)	1.9 (35.4)	2.8 (37.0)	6.3 (43.3)	11.9 (53.4)	17.1 (62.8)	21.2 (70.2)	25.1 (77.2)	25.9 (78.6)	21.6 (70.9)	15.1 (59.2)	9.0 (48.2)	3.9 (39.0)	13.5 (56.3)
Mean daily minimum °C (°F)	−1.4 (29.5)	−1.3 (29.7)	0.9 (33.6)	5.2 (41.4)	10.7 (51.3)	16.4 (61.5)	21.0 (69.8)	21.6 (70.9)	17.3 (63.1)	10.6 (51.1)	4.7 (40.5)	0.5 (32.9)	8.8 (47.8)
Record low °C (°F)	−10.8 (12.6)	−12.5 (9.5)	−7.5 (18.5)	−3.6 (25.5)	0.2 (32.4)	7.2 (45.0)	10.7 (51.3)	13.2 (55.8)	5.7 (42.3)	0.5 (32.9)	−2.3 (27.9)	−10.2 (13.6)	−12.5 (9.5)
Average precipitation mm (inches)	74.2 (2.92)	73.0 (2.87)	103.5 (4.07)	104.4 (4.11)	135.8 (5.35)	186.1 (7.33)	245.5 (9.67)	141.9 (5.59)	162.5 (6.40)	94.3 (3.71)	68.8 (2.71)	83.9 (3.30)	1,467 (57.76)
Average precipitation days (≥ 1.0 mm)	13.0	11.4	11.9	9.6	9.6	11.9	12.2	9.8	9.6	7.5	8.7	12.7	128.1
Mean monthly sunshine hours	85.7	105.7	149.0	177.6	198.9	146.7	158.8	187.6	140.6	134.4	105.5	82.0	1,675.1
Source: Japan Meteorological Agency (1991–2020 normals, extremes 1978–present)

== History ==
The area of Miyoshi was part on ancient Bingo Province. During the Edo Period, it was largely the territory of Hiroshima Domain. Following the Meiji restoration, the town of Miyoshi was established with the creation of the modern municipalities system on April 1, 1889. Miyoshi was raised to city status on March 31, 1954.

On April 1, 2004, Miyoshi absorbed the towns of Kisa, Mirasaka and Miwa, the villages of Funo, Kimita and Sakugi (all from Futami District), and the town of Kōnu (from Kōnu District) to create the new and expanded city of Miyoshi. Futami District was dissolved as a result of this merger.

== Government ==
Miyoshi has a mayor-council form of government with a directly elected mayor and a unicameral city council of 24 members. Miyoshi contributes one member to the Hiroshima Prefectural Assembly. In terms of national politics, the city is part of the Hiroshima 5th district of the lower house of the Diet of Japan.

== Economy ==
The economy of Miyoshi is largely agricultural, with grapes and wineries predominant. Light manufacturing is centered on automobile engines and components for Mazda, which also has its test and proving grounds located in the city.

== Education ==
Miyoshi has 22 public elementary schools, 12 public junior high schools and one public high school operated by the city government, and three public high school operated by the Hiroshima Prefectural Board of Education. The prefecture also operates one special education school for the disabled.

== Transportation ==
=== Railway ===
JR West (JR West) - Geibi Line

- Shimowachi - Shiomachi - Kamisugi - Yatsugi - Miyoshi - Nishi-Miyoshi - Shiwachi - Kamikawatachi

JR West (JR West) - Fukuen Line

- Kōnu - Kajita - Bingo-Yasuda - Kisa - Mirasaka - Shiomachi - Kamisugi - Yatsugi - Miyoshi

=== Highways ===
- Chūgoku Expressway
- Onomichi Expressway
- Matsue Expressway
- National Route 54
- National Route 183
- National Route 184
- National Route 375
- National Route 433
- National Route 434

== Sister city relations ==
- - Ya'an, Sichuan, China, since October 6, 1992
- - Americus, Georgia, United States, since May 18,1995
- - Sacheon, South Gyeongsang Province South Korea, since May 24, 2001

== Notable people from Miyoshi ==
- Daisuke Nishio, animator and movie director
- Shota Kawamoto, para-cyclist
