= Yaga Station (Hiroshima) =

Railway station in Hiroshima, Japan

Coordinates: 34°23′56.0″N 132°29′50.0″E

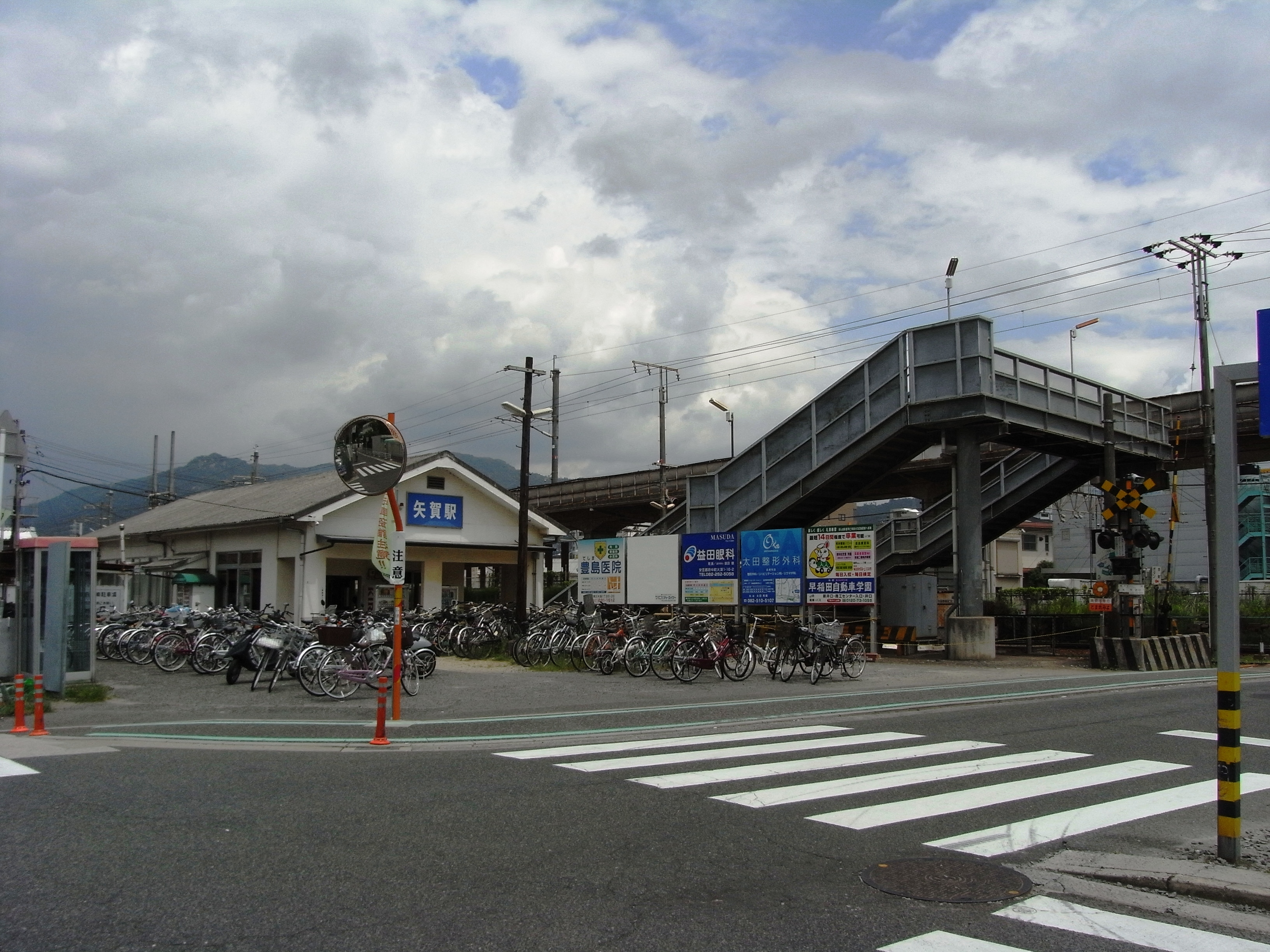
Yaga Station building (July 2008)

Yaga Station (矢賀駅, Yaga-eki) is a JR West Geibi Line station located in 5-chōme, Yaga, Higashi-ku, Hiroshima, Hiroshima Prefecture, Japan.

== History ==
- 1929-03-20: Yaga Station opens
- 1937-07-01: Switching equipment at Yaga station is expanded
- August 1941: Yaga Station closed due to World War II
- 1942-10-28: Signal cabin installed at Yaga Station
- 1943-04-02: Station status reinstated, and Yaga Station reopens
- 1987-04-01: Japanese National Railways is privatized, and Yaga Station becomes a JR West station

== Station building and platforms ==
Yaga Station features one island platform capable of handling two lines simultaneously. Trains bound for Shiwaguchi and Miyoshi are handled on the upper end (上り) of the platform, and trains bound for Hiroshima are handled on the lower end (下り). The station features a Green Window.

=== Environs ===
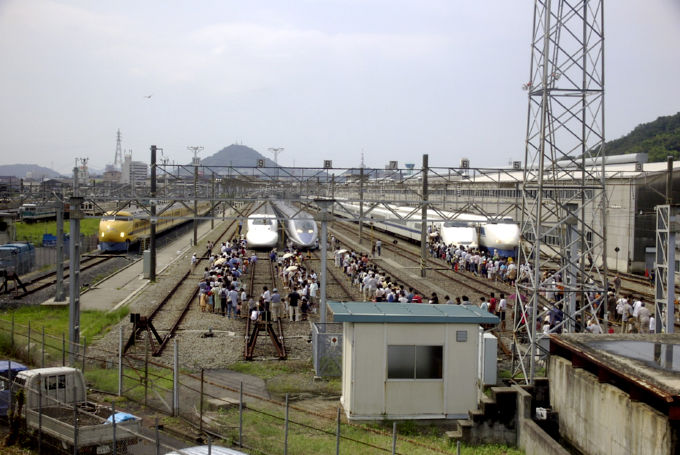
JR West Hakata Railyard, located just north of Yaga Station (September 2003).

- Kirin Beer Park Hiroshima
- Kirin Hiroshima Brewery
- Diamond City Soleil (ダイヤモンドシティ・ソレイユ)
- Hiroshima Wald 11 (movie theaters)
- Takamagahara Memorial Gardens
- Hiroshima Municipal Fuchū Elementary School
- Hiroshima Municipal Nakayama Elementary School
- Hiroshima Municipal Yaga Elementary School
- JR West Hakata Railyard, Hiroshima Branch
- JR Freight Railyard

=== Highway access ===
- Japan National Route 54
- Hiroshima Expressway Route 1 (Aki-Fuchū Route)
- Hiroshima Prefectural Route 37 (Hiroshima-Miyoshi Route)
- Hiroshima Prefectural Route 70 (Hiroshima-Nakashima Route)
- Hiroshima Prefectural Route 84 (Higashi Kaita Hiroshima Route)
- Hiroshima Prefectural Route 151 (Fuchū-Kaita Route)
- Hiroshima Prefectural Route 152 (Fuchū-Gion Route)
- Hiroshima Prefectural Route 264 (Nakayama-Onaga Route)
- Hiroshima Prefectural Route 272 (Kamimiyachō-Shinchi Route)

== Connecting lines ==
All lines are JR West lines.

Geibi Line
Miyoshi Express (#1, 2, 5, 6, 7, 8)

No stop

Miyoshi Express (#3, 4)

Akiyaguchi Station — Yaga Station — Hiroshima Station

Commuter Liner

No stop

Miyoshi Liner/Local

Hesaka Station — Yaga Station — Hiroshima Station
