= Shiomachi Station =

Railway station in Miyoshi, Hiroshima Prefecture, Japan

Shiomachi Station 塩町駅
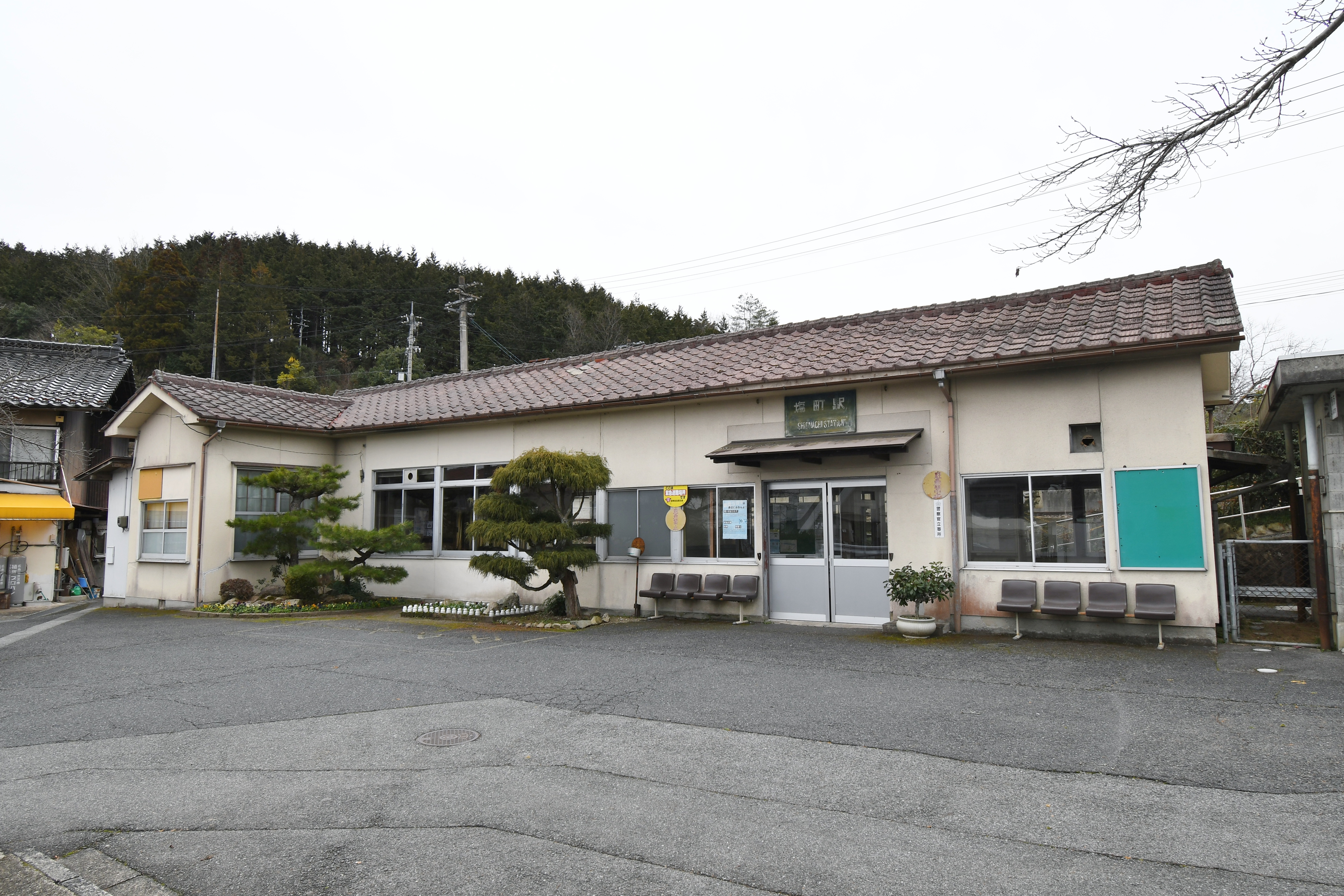
- Shiomachi Station, January 2023

General information
- Location: 2183 Shiomachi-chō, Miyoshi-shi, Hiroshima-ken 729-6205; Japan
- Coordinates: 34°46′27.91″N 132°54′50.01″E
- Owner: West Japan Railway Company
- Operator: West Japan Railway Company
- Lines: P Geibi Line; Z Geibi Line
- Distance: 83.2 km (51.7 miles) from Bitchū-Kōjiro
- Platforms: 1 island platform
- Tracks: 2
- Connections: Bus stop

Construction
- Accessible: Yes

Other information
- Status: Unstaffed
- Website: Official website

History
- Opened: 22 April 1930
- Former names: Takō (to 1934)

Passengers
- FY2019: 137

Services
Preceding station	JR West	Following station
Kamisugi towards Hiroshima	Geibi Line Local	Shimowachi towards Niimi
Kamisugi towards Miyoshi	Fukuen Line Local	Mirasaka towards Fukuyama
Location
- Location within Hiroshima Prefecture Location within Japan

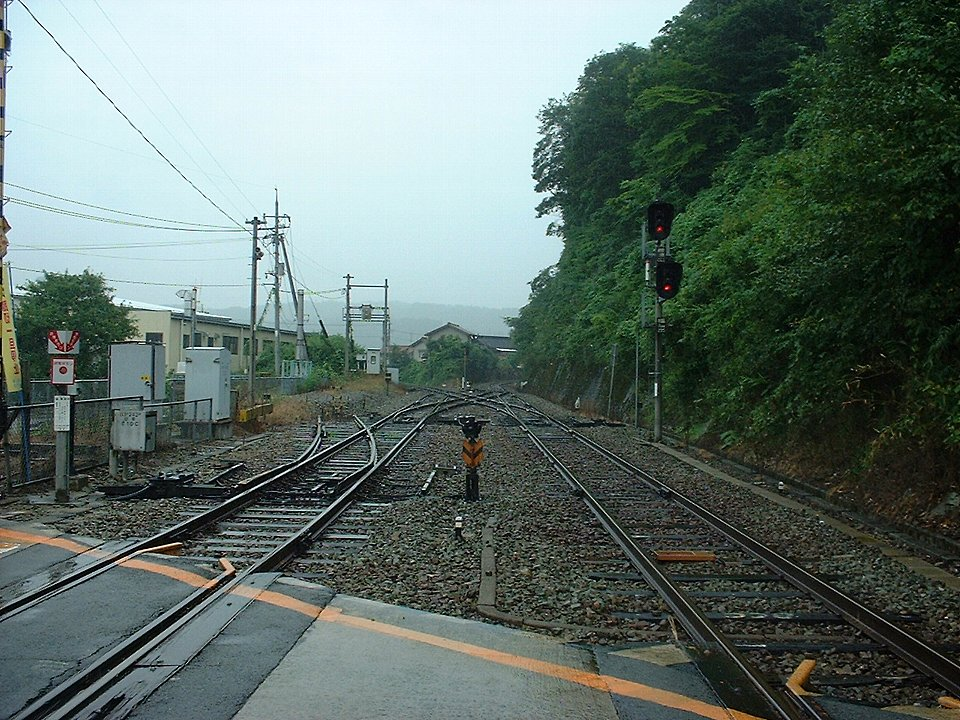
The junction of the Geibi and Fukuen Lines near Shiomachi Station.

Shiomachi Station (塩町駅, Shiomachi-eki) is a passenger railway station located in the city of Miyoshi, Hiroshima Prefecture, Japan. It is operated by the West Japan Railway Company (JR West). This station should not be confused with other stations of similar-sounding name on the Geibi Line: Shimowachi, Shiwachi, and Shiwaguchi.

== Lines ==
Shiomachi Station is served by the JR West Geibi Line, and is located 83.2 kilometers from the terminus of the line at Bitchū-Kōjiro and 89.6 kilometers from Niimi. It is also the nominal terminal of the 78.0 kilometer Fukuen Line from Fukuyama, although most trains continue past Shiomachi using the Geibi Line tracks to terminate at Miyoshi.

=== Platforms ===
1	■ P Geibi Line	for Bingo-Shōbara and Bingo-Ochiai
1	■ Z Fukuen Line	for Jōge and Fuchū
2	■ P Geibi Line	for Miyoshi
2	■ Z Fukuen Line	for Miyoshi

== Station layout ==
The station consists of one island platform connected to a wooden station building by an underground passage. The station building is used as the office of a local taxi company, but the railway portion of the building is unattended.

== History ==
Shiomachi Station was opened on 22 April 1930 as Takō Station (田幸) on the Geibi Railway. The Geibi Railway was nationalized and becomes part of the Shōbara Line on 1 June 1933. The station was renamed on 1 January 1934. Until this time, the present Kamisugi Station had been known as Shiomachi Station. With the privatization of the Japanese National Railways (JNR) on 1 April 1987, the station came under the control of JR West.

== Passenger statistics ==
In fiscal 2019, the station was used by an average of 137 passengers daily.

== Surrounding area ==
- Miyoshi Factory (manufacturing automobile parts)
- Miyoshi Municipal Shiomachi Junior High School
- Hiroshima Prefectural Miyoshi Seiryo High School
- Japan National Route 184

== See also ==
- List of railway stations in Japan
