= Hesaka Station =

Railway station in Hiroshima, Japan

Coordinates: 34°26′17.2″N 132°29′28.3″E

Hesaka Station (戸坂駅, Hesaka-eki) is a JR West Geibi Line station located in 2-chōme, Hesaka Sōda, Higashi-ku, Hiroshima, Hiroshima Prefecture, Japan.

== History ==
Hesaka Station 戸坂駅
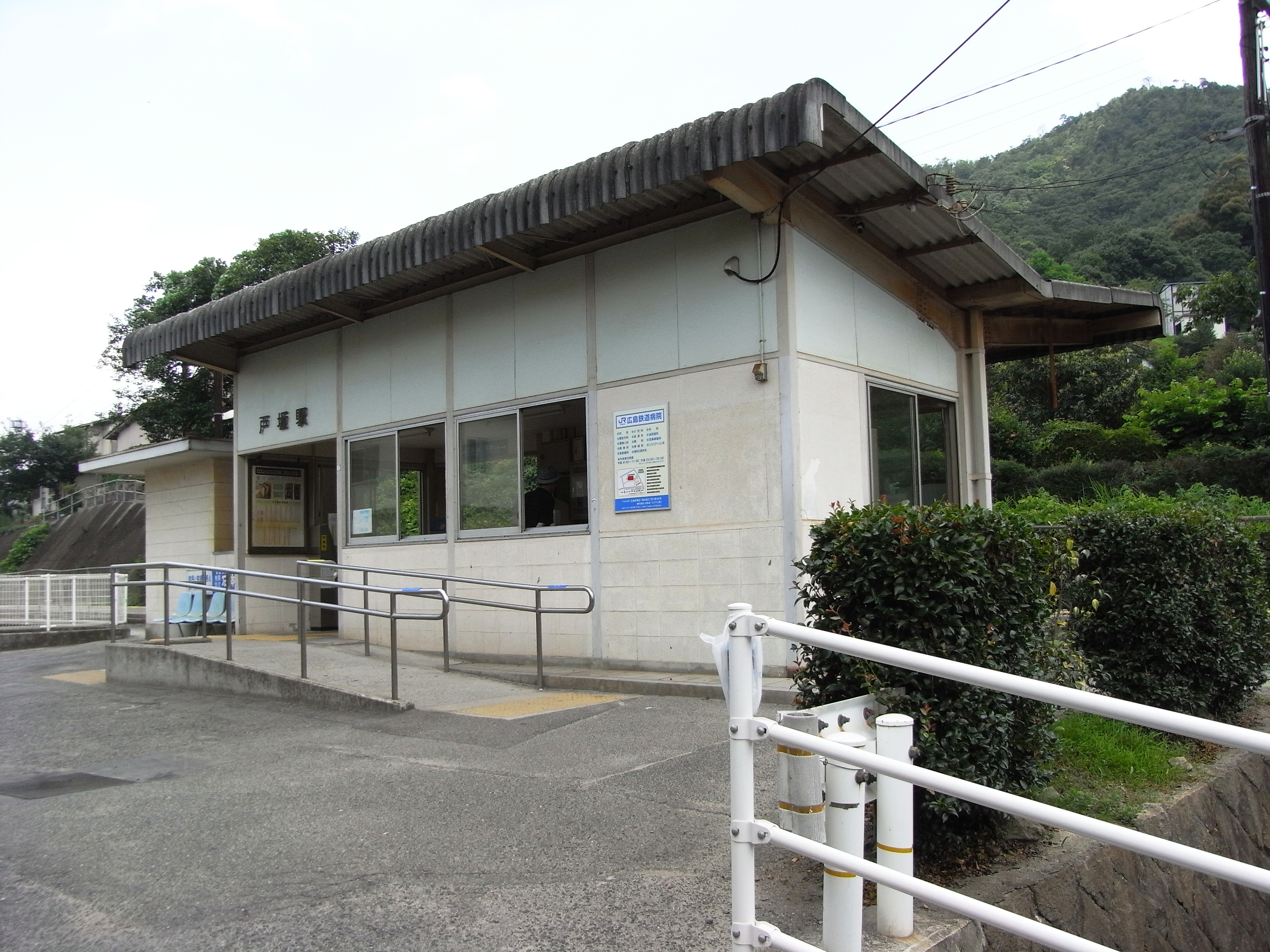
- Hesaka Station building on July 22, 2008

General information
- Location: Hesaka Sōda, Higashi-ku, Hiroshima, Hiroshima Prefecture, Japan
- Line: Geibi Line
- Platforms: 1
- Tracks: 1

History
- Opened: 25 April 1916
Location

- 1916-04-25: Hesaka Station opens
- 1987-04-01: Japanese National Railways is privatized, and Hesaka Station becomes a JR West station

== Station building and platforms ==
Hesaka Station features one side platform capable of handling one line. Trains bound for Shiwaguchi and Miyoshi are handled on the upper end (上り) of the platform, and trains bound for Hiroshima are handled on the lower end (下り). The station is unstaffed, featuring an automated ticket vending machine. The Hesaka Station building is a small waiting area with a galvanized roof.

=== Environs ===
- Hiroshima Jōhoku Gakuen (Jōhoku High School and Jōhoku Junior High School)
- Suikō Apartments
- Hiroshima Hesaka Nakamachi Post Office
- Hiroshima Municipal Gion Elementary School
- Hiroshima Municipal Hara Elementary School
- Hiroshima Municipal Hesaka Elementary School
- Hiroshima Municipal Gion Higashi Junior High School
- Ōshimo Academy Gion High School
- Hijiyama University
- Hiroshima Chūō Women's Junior College
- JR West Kabe Line Shimo-Gion Station
- JR West Kabe Line Furuichibashi Station
- Hiroshima Rapid Transit Astramline Nishihara Station
- Ōta River

=== Highway access ===
- Japan National Route 54
- Hiroshima Prefectural Route 37 (Hiroshima-Miyoshi Route)
- Hiroshima Prefectural Route 152 (Fuchū-Gion Route)
- Hiroshima Prefectural Route 277 (Furuichi-Hiroshima Route)

== Connecting lines ==
All lines are JR West lines.

Geibi Line
Miyoshi Express

No stop

Commuter Liner

No stop

Miyoshi Liner/Local

Akiyaguchi Station — Hesaka Station — Yaga Station
