= Yoshidaguchi Station =

Railway station in Akitakata, Hiroshima Prefecture, Japan

Yoshidaguchi Station 吉田口駅
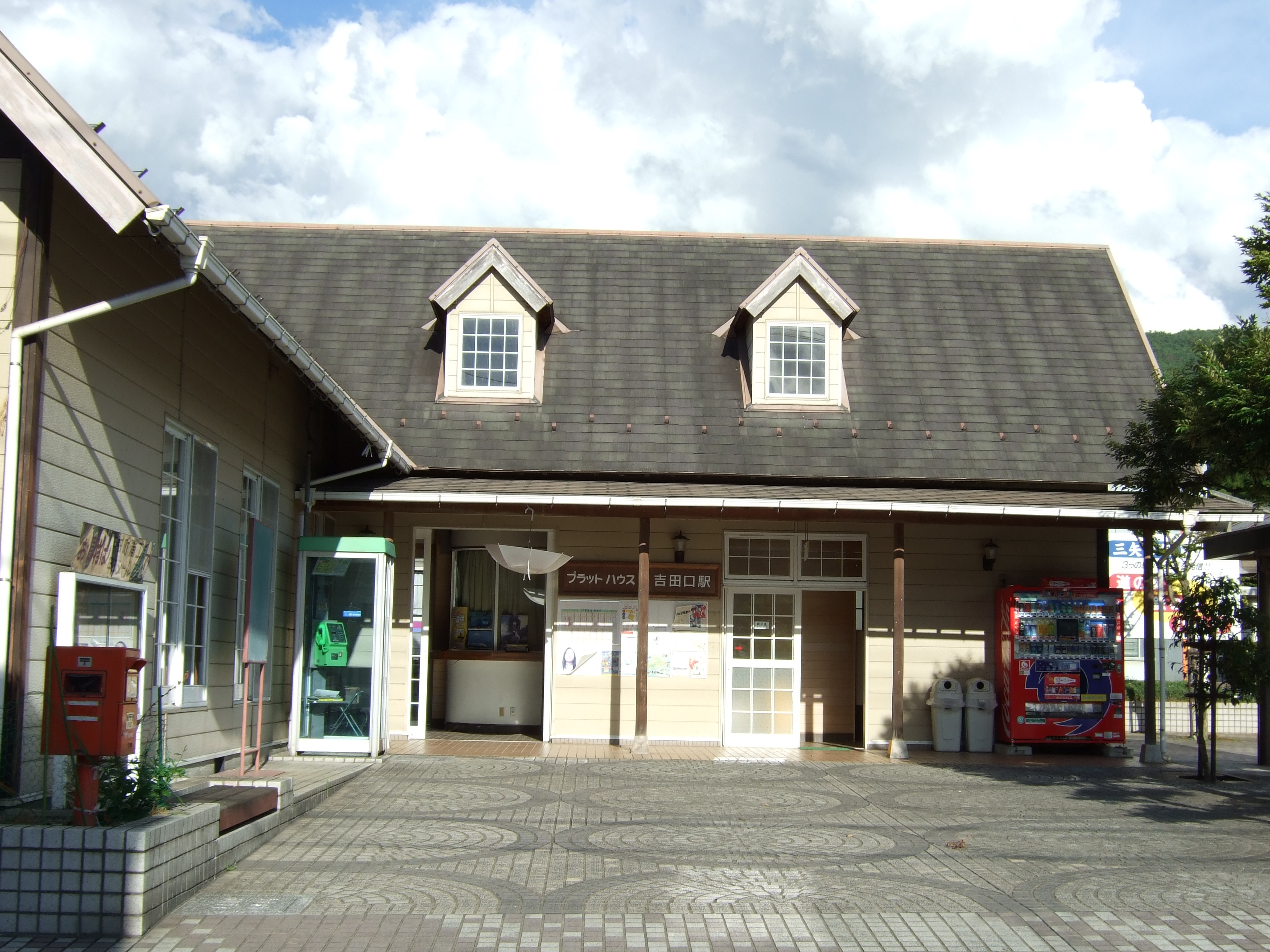
- Entrance to Yoshidaguchi Station in August 2008

General information
- Location: 240 Shimoobara Kodacho, Akitakata-shi, Hiroshima-shi 739-1103; Japan
- Coordinates: 34°39′53.17″N 132°44′44.35″E
- Owner: West Japan Railway Company
- Operator: West Japan Railway Company
- Line: P Geibi Line
- Distance: 109.9 km (68.3 miles) from Bitchū-Kōjiro
- Platforms: 1 island platform
- Tracks: 2
- Connections: Bus stop

Construction
- Structure type: At-grade
- Accessible: Yes

Other information
- Status: Unstaffed
- Website: Official website

History
- Opened: 28 April 1915

Passengers
- FY2019: 46

Services
Preceding station	JR West	Following station
Mukaihara towards Hiroshima	Geibi Line Local	Kōtachi towards Niimi
Location
- Location within Hiroshima Prefecture Location within Japan

Yoshidaguchi Station (吉田口駅, Yoshidaguchi-eki) is a passenger railway station located in the city of Akitakata, Hiroshima Prefecture, Japan. It is operated by the West Japan Railway Company (JR West).

== Lines ==
Yoshidaguchi Station is served by the JR West Geibi Line, and is located 109.9 kilometers from the terminus of the line at Bitchū-Kōjiro and 19.6 kilometers from Miyoshi.

== Station layout ==
The station consists of one island platform connected to the station building by a level crossing. The station is a multi-purpose meeting building named "Pratt House." The station is unattended.

=== Platforms ===
1	■ P Geibi Line	for Kōtachi and Miyoshi
2	■ P Geibi Line	for Shiwaguchi and Hiroshima

== History ==
Yoshidaguchi Station was opened on 28 April 1915. With the privatization of the Japanese National Railways (JNR) on 1 April 1987, the station came under the control of JR West. In November 1992 the current station building was completed.

== Passenger statistics ==
In fiscal 2019, the station was used by an average of 46 passengers daily.

== Surrounding area ==
- Yoshida Post Office
- Yoshida Kōriyama Castle ruins, a National Historic Monument, former castle of the daimyō Mōri Motonari
- Akitakata Municipal Kōta Elementary School
- Akitakata Municipal Yoshida Elementary School
- Hiroshima Prefectural Yoshida High School

== See also ==
- List of railway stations in Japan
