= Kumura Station =

Railway station in Hiroshima, Japan

Coordinates: 34°28′56.0″N 132°30′29.5″E

Kumura Station 玖村駅
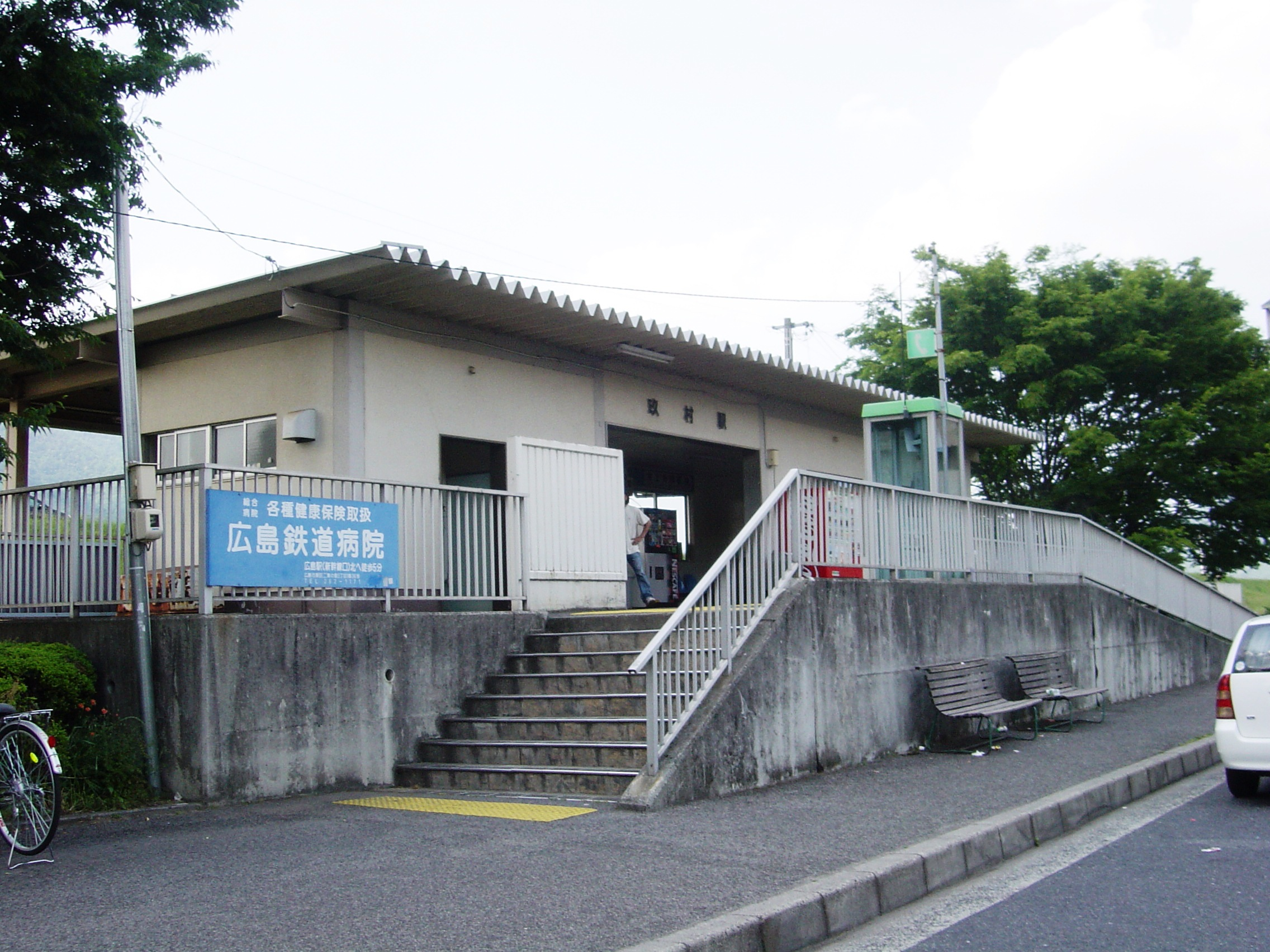
- Kumura Station building (May 15, 2005).

General information
- Location: Asakita, Hiroshima, Hiroshima; Japan
- Operator: JR West
- Line: Geibi Line

Construction
- Structure type: Ground level

History
- Opened: 1915
Location

Kumura Station (玖村駅, Kumura-eki) is a JR West Geibi Line station located in 5-chōme, Fukawa, Asakita-ku, Hiroshima, Hiroshima Prefecture, Japan.

== History ==
- 1915-04-28: Kumura Station opens
- 1987-04-01: Japanese National Railways is privatized, and Kumura Station becomes a JR West station
- 2008-05-09: Japanese newspaper and news program report on two cats found sleeping on the ticket gate machine in this station. The cats are dubbed the "Station Cats".

== Station building and platforms ==
Kumura Station features one side platform capable of handling one line. Trains bound for Shiwaguchi and Miyoshi are handled on the upper end (上り) of the platform, and trains bound for Hiroshima are handled on the lower end (下り). Tickets were formerly sold at the supermarket located in front of the station. The station is unstaffed and features an automated ticket vending machine. Kumura Station is a prefabricated building with a galvanized steel roof. As the station building is located above the road, passengers must ascend a set of stairs to access the station.

=== Environs ===
- Kōyō New Town
- Egeyama Kōen
- Hiroshima Kōyō Kanahira Post Office
- Yagi Post Office
- Hiroshima Municipal Kōyō High School
- Hiroshima Municipal Shiroyama Kita Junior High School
- Hiroshima Municipal Ochiai Elementary School
- Hiroshima Municipal Yagi Elementary School
- Hiroshima Municipal Bairin Elementary School
- JR West Kabe Line Kami-Yagi Station (1.5 km west)
- JR West Kabe Line Bairin Station (1.5 km west)
- Ōta River (太田川)
- Takase Ōhashi

=== Highway access ===
- Japan National Route 54
- Hiroshima Prefectural Route 37 (Hiroshima-Miyoshi Route)
- Hiroshima Prefectural Route 270 (Yagi-Midorii Route)
- Hiroshima Prefectural Route 271 (Yagi Route)

== Connecting lines ==
All lines are JR West lines.

Geibi Line
Miyoshi Express

No stop

Commuter Liner

No stop

Miyoshi Liner/Local

Shimofukawa Station — Kumura Station — Akiyaguchi Station
