= Mukaihara Station =

Railway station in Akitakata, Hiroshima Prefecture, Japan

Mukaihara Station 向原駅
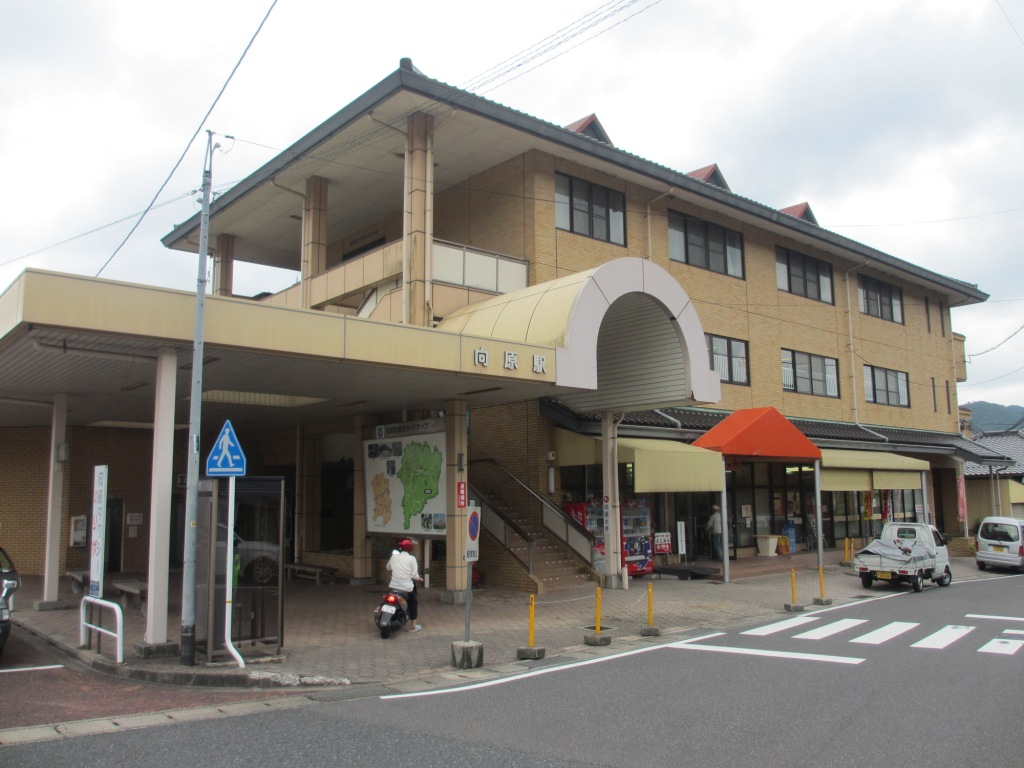
- Mukaihara Station, September 2013

General information
- Location: 73 Saka Mukaiharacho, Akitakata-shi, Hiroshima-shi 739-1201; Japan
- Coordinates: 34°36′54.77″N 132°43′11.58″E
- Owner: West Japan Railway Company
- Operator: West Japan Railway Company
- Line: P Geibi Line
- Distance: 116.1 km (72.1 miles) from Bitchū-Kōjiro
- Platforms: 1 island platform
- Tracks: 2
- Connections: Bus stop

Construction
- Accessible: Yes

Other information
- Status: Unstaffed
- Website: Official website

History
- Opened: 28 April 1915

Passengers
- FY2019: 204

Services
Preceding station	JR West	Following station
Ibaraichi towards Hiroshima	Geibi Line Local	Yoshidaguchi towards Niimi
Karuga towards Hiroshima	Geibi Line Rapid Miyoshi Liner	Kōtachi towards Niimi
Location
- Location within Hiroshima Prefecture Location within Japan

Mukaihara Station (向原駅, Mukaihara-eki) is a passenger railway station located in the city of Akitakata, Hiroshima Prefecture, Japan. It is operated by the West Japan Railway Company (JR West).

== Lines ==
Mukaihara Station is served by the JR West Geibi Line, and is located 116.1 kilometers from the terminus of the line at Bitchū-Kōjiro and 25.8 kilometers from Miyoshi.

== Station layout ==
The station consists of one island platform connected by footbridge to the second story of a large station building which includes a supermarket and the Akitakada City Local Industry Promotion Center. The ticket gates are located on the second floor. The station is unattended.

=== Platforms ===
1	■ P Geibi Line	for Kōtachi and Miyoshi
2	■ P Geibi Line	for Shiwaguchi and Hiroshima

== History ==
Mukaihara Station was opened on 28 April 1915. In March 1986 the current station building was completed. With the privatization of the Japanese National Railways (JNR) on 1 April 1987, the station came under the control of JR West.

== Passenger statistics ==
In fiscal 2019, the station was used by an average of 204 passengers daily.

== Surrounding area ==
- Akitakata City Hall Mukohara Branch (former Mukaihara Town Hall)
- Akitakata Municipal Mukaihara Junior High School
- Akitakata Municipal Mukaihara Elementary School
- Hiroshima Prefectural Mukaihara High School

== See also ==
- List of railway stations in Japan
