= Takata District, Hiroshima =

Former district in Hiroshima prefecture, Japan

Takata District (高田郡, Takata-gun) was a district located in Hiroshima Prefecture, Japan.

== Towns ==
- Kōda
- Midori
- Mukaihara
- Takamiya
- Yachiyo
- Yoshida

== Merger ==
- On March 1, 2004 - the towns of Kōta, Midori, Mukaihara, Takamiya, Yachiyo and Yoshida were merged to create the city of Akitakata. Therefore, Takata District was dissolved as a result of this merger.
