= Miwa, Hiroshima =

Dissolved municipality in Futami district, Hiroshima prefecture, Japan

Miwa (三和町, Miwa-chō) was a town located in Futami District, Hiroshima Prefecture, Japan.

As of 2003, the town had an estimated population of 3,622 and a density of 49.69 persons per km^{2}. The total area was 72.89 km^{2}.

On April 1, 2004, Miwa, along with the towns of Kisa and Mirasaka, the villages of Funo, Kimita and Sakugi (all from Futami District), and the town of Kōnu (from Kōnu District), was merged with the expanded city of Miyoshi and no longer exists as an independent municipality.
