= Kōtachi Station =

Railway station in Akitakata, Hiroshima Prefecture, Japan

Kōtachi Station 甲立駅
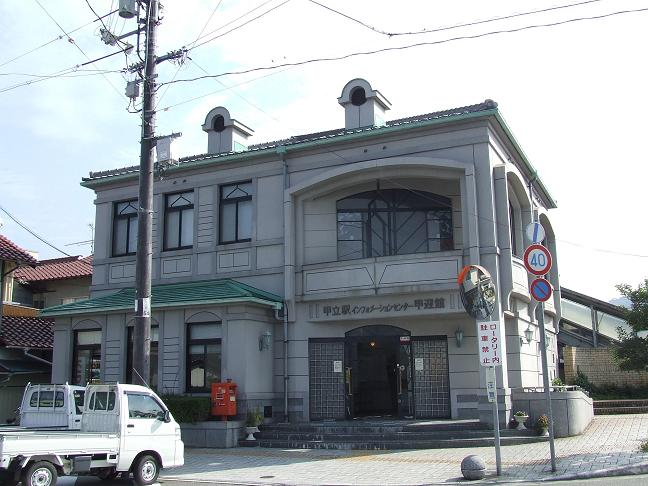
- Kōtachi Station

General information
- Location: 1994 Takatahara, Kōtachi-chō,, Akitakata-shi, Hiroshima-shi 739-1101; Japan
- Coordinates: 34°41′33.4″N 132°45′35.97″E
- Owner: West Japan Railway Company
- Operator: West Japan Railway Company
- Line: P Geibi Line
- Distance: 106.5 km (66.2 miles) from Bitchū-Kōjiro
- Platforms: 1 island platform
- Tracks: 2
- Connections: Bus stop

Construction
- Accessible: Yes

Other information
- Status: Staffed
- Website: Official website

History
- Opened: 28 April 1915

Passengers
- FY2019: 108

Services
Preceding station	JR West	Following station
Yoshidaguchi towards Hiroshima	Geibi Line Local	Kamikawatachi towards Niimi
Mukaihara towards Hiroshima	Geibi Line Rapid Miyoshi Liner	Miyoshi towards Niimi
Location
- Location within Hiroshima Prefecture Location within Japan

Kōtachi Station (甲立駅, Kōtachi-eki) is a passenger railway station located in the city of Akitakata, Hiroshima Prefecture, Japan. It is operated by the West Japan Railway Company (JR West).

== Lines ==
Kōtachi Station is served by the JR West Geibi Line, and is located 106.5 kilometers from the terminus of the line at Bitchū-Kōjiro and 16.2 kilometers from Miyoshi.

== Station layout ==
The station consists of one island platform connected the station building by a footbridge. The station building is part of the "Information Center Kōgyōkan," a building completed in 1996. The station building is operated by JA Hiroshima North. The station is located in the heart of Kōtachi-chō, and is considered a model station. The station is staffed.

=== Platforms ===
1	■ P Geibi Line	for Miyoshi and Bingo-Shōbara
2	■ P Geibi Line	for Shiwaguchi and Hiroshima

== History ==
Kōtachi Station was opened on 28 April 1915. With the privatization of the Japanese National Railways (JNR) on 1 April 1987, the station came under the control of JR West.

== Passenger statistics ==
In fiscal 2019, the station was used by an average of 108 passengers daily.

== Surrounding area ==
- Akitakata Municipal Offices, Kōtachi Branch
- Akitakata Municipal Kōta Junior High School
- Akitakata Municipal Kōtachi Elementary School
- Akitakata Municipal Kōda Higashi Elementary School
- Gōno River
- Kōrinbō (head temple of the Aki sect of Buddhism, considered a cultural treasure)
- Japan National Route 54

== See also ==
- List of railway stations in Japan
