= Akitakata =

Akitakata 安芸高田市
- City
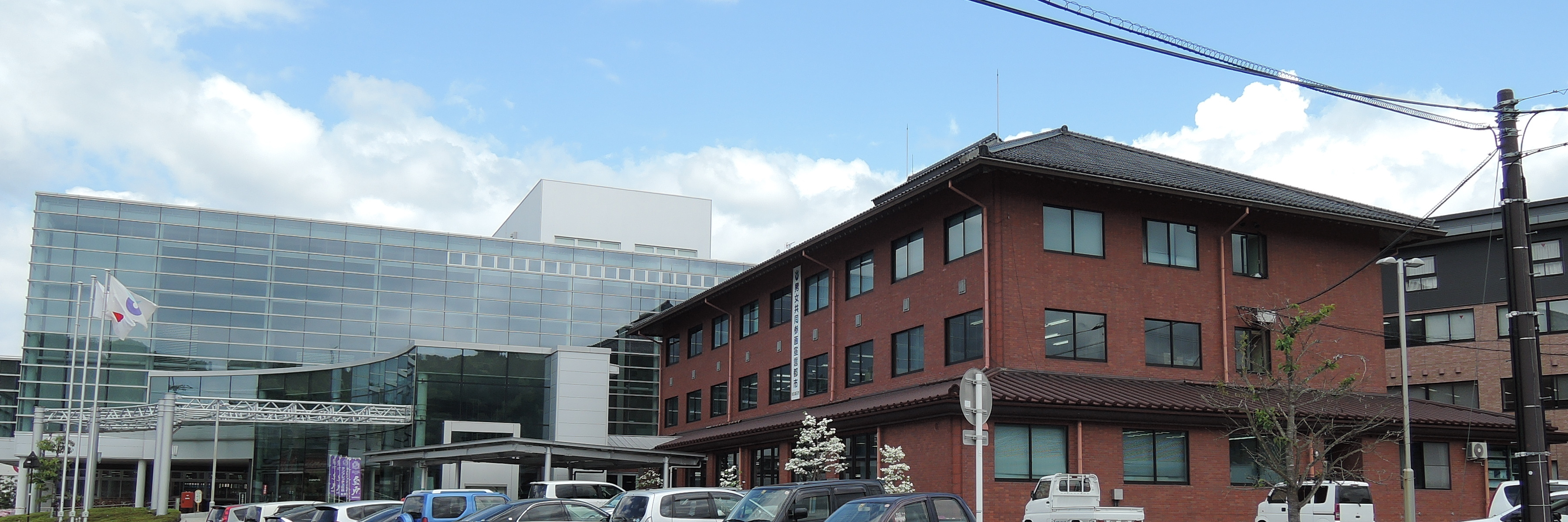
- Akitakata city hall

- Flag Emblem
- Interactive map of Akitakata
- Location in Japan
- Coordinates: 34°39′47″N 132°42′23″E
- Country: Japan
- Region: Chūgoku (San'yō)
- Prefecture: Hiroshima
- First official recorded: 9th century (official)
- Yoshida town settled: January 1, 1896
- Current city merged: March 1, 2004

Government
  - Mayor: Etsushi Fujimoto (藤本悦志) - from July 2024

Area
  - Total: 537.75 km^{2} (207.63 sq mi)

Population (May 1, 2023)
  - Total: 26,810
  - Density: 49.86/km^{2} (129.1/sq mi)
- Time zone: UTC+09:00 (JST)
- City hall address: Yoshidachō, Yoshida 791, Akitakata-shi, Hiroshima-ken 731-0592
- Website: Official website
- Symbols
- Flower: Hydrangea
- Tree: Cherry blossom

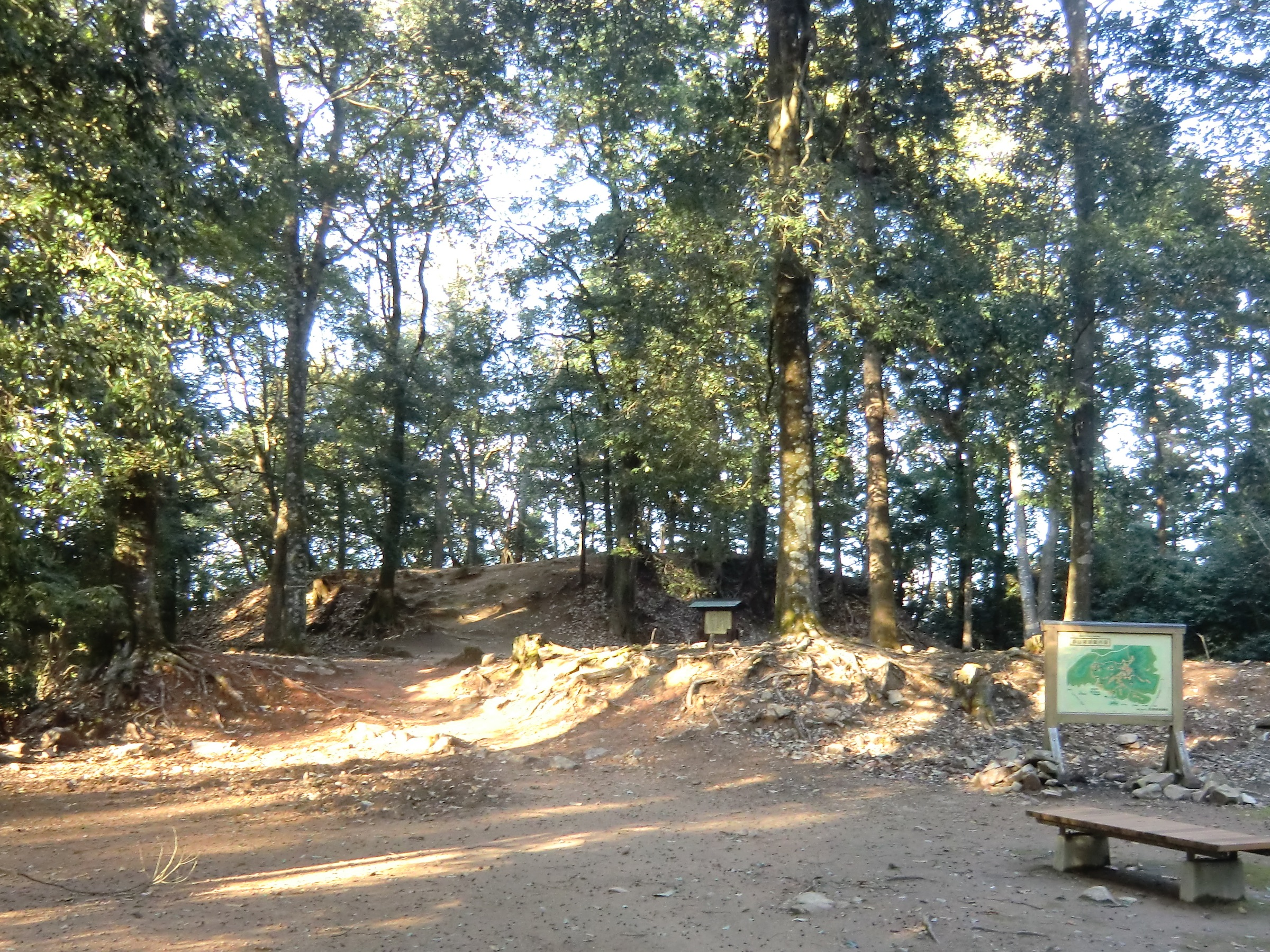
ruins of Yoshida-Koriyama Castle

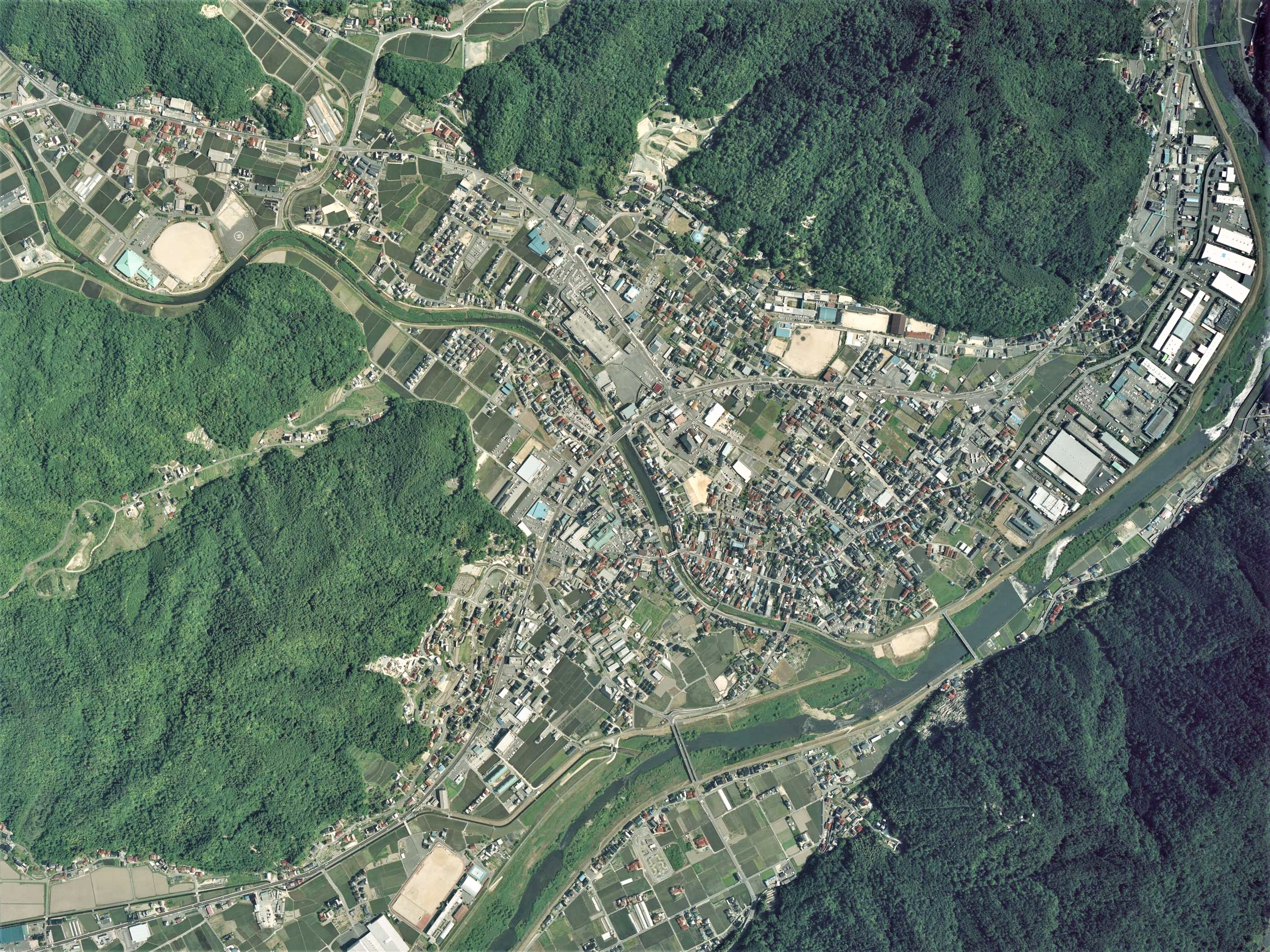
Aerial view of Yoshida urban center

Akitakata (安芸高田市, Akitakata-shi; Japanese pronunciation: [ä́.k̟ʲi̥ | tä̀.ꜜkä́.tä́(.ɕì)]) is a city located in north-central Hiroshima Prefecture, Japan. As of 1 May 2023, the city had an estimated population of 26,810 in 13,319 households and a population density of 50 persons per km^{2}. The total area of the city is 537.75 square kilometres (207.63 sq mi). The city lays claim to be the birthplace and hometown of Mōri Motonari, the Sengoku period daimyō of the 16th century.

== Geography ==
Akitakata is located in north-central Hiroshima Prefecture, and is surrounded by the Chugoku Mountains. The Midori and Takamiya neighborhoods of the city are designated as heavy snowfall areas.

=== Adjoining municipalities ===
Hiroshima Prefecture

- Hiroshima
- Higashihiroshima
- Kitahiroshima
- Miyoshi

Shimane Prefecture

- Ōnan

== Climate ==
Akitakata has a humid subtropical climate (Köppen Cfa) characterized by warm summers and cool winters with light to no snowfall. The average annual temperature in Akitakata is 13.0 °C. The average annual rainfall is 1581 mm with September as the wettest month. The temperatures are highest on average in August, at around 24.8 °C, and lowest in January, at around 1.6 °C.

== Demographics ==
Per Japanese census data, the population of Izumi has declined steadily over the past century.

Historical population
Year	Pop.	±%
1950	57,214	—
1960	49,715	−13.1%
1970	38,541	−22.5%
1980	36,984	−4.0%
1990	36,115	−2.3%
2000	34,439	−4.6%
2010	31,497	−8.5%
Higashihiroshima population statistics

== History ==
The area of Akitakata is part of ancient Aki Province. During the Sengoku period, the Mōri clan, once minor local warlords, rose under the leadership of Mōri Motonari to dominate the Chūgoku region of western Japan. The 1540-1541 Siege of Yoshida-Kōriyama Castle between the Mōri clan and the rival Amago clan occurred in what is now the Yoshida neighborhood of Akitakata. After the establishment of the Tokugawa Shogunate, the area was part of the holdings of Hiroshima Domain. Following the Meiji restoration, the area was organized into villages within Takata District, including the village of Yoshida, with the creation of the modern municipalities system on April 1, 1889. Yoshida was raised to town status on January 1, 1896. The city of Akitakata was established on March 1, 2004, from the merger Yoshida with the towns of Kōda, Midori, Mukaihara, Takamiya, Yachiyo (all from Takata District). Therefore, Takata District was dissolved as a result of this merger.

== Government ==
Akitakata has a mayor-council form of government with a directly elected mayor and a unicameral city council of 16 members. Akitakata contributes one member to the Hiroshima Prefectural Assembly. In terms of national politics, the city is part of the Hiroshima 3rd district of the lower house of the Diet of Japan.

=== Hiroshima vote-buying scandal ===
The mayor of Akitakata, Hiroshi Kodama, admitted receiving 600,000 yen from former Minister of Justice Katsuyuki Kawai and appeared at a news conference on 26 June 2020 with a shaved head to express his remorse. He resigned a week later, having stayed in office for only two and a half months. Other recipients of the cash gifts included several elected representatives in the city, amongst them the Speaker and the vice-Speaker of the Municipal Assembly.

== Economy ==
The economy of Akitaka is based on agriculture and food processing.

== Education ==
Akitakata has nine public elementary schools and six public junior high schools operated by the city government, and two public high schools operated by the Hiroshima prefectural Board of Education.

== Transportation ==
=== Railway ===
JR West (JR West) - Geibi Line

- Kōtachi - Yoshidaguchi - Mukaihara

=== Highways ===
- Chūgoku Expressway
- National Route 54
- National Route 433

== Sister cities ==
- Selwyn District, New Zealand, since 9 September 1992.

== Local attractions ==
Akitakata is a mountainous farming area known for many traditional events as well as certain food products. One such food product is Ebisu tea, a sweet fragrant tea, that comes from Mukaihara Town. Another is yuzu juice (柚子ジュース), a product of the Kawane area of Takamiya town in the northeastern part of the city.

=== Notable places ===
- Akitakata City Historical Museum
- Tajihi-Sarugake Castle ruins. Mōri Motonari spent 23 years at this location. National Historic Site
- TS-Takata Circuit
- Yoshida-Kōriyama Castle ruins, Main stronghold of the Mōri clan, National Historic Site

=== Culture ===
Kagura, an ancient traditional form of Shinto dance and music, is still alive there today. The towns of Midori and Takamiya practice the "new dance" style, which is not actually new at all, just a later emergent performance style compared to the "old style". (There is a Kagura village in Midori town called Kaguramonzentojimura where various Kagura performances and competitions begin in August and last until December.)

Akitakata City is in the countryside, and still maintains many traditional local festivals. One such is Hanadaue, or rice-planting festival where men play flutes and taiko while women sing and plant rice.
