= Kōnu, Hiroshima =

Dissolved municipality in Hiroshima prefecture, Japan

Kōnu (甲奴町, kōnu-chō) was a town located in Kōnu District, Hiroshima Prefecture, Japan.

As of 2003, the town had an estimated population of 3,114 and a density of 47.78 persons per km^{2}. The total area was 65.17 km^{2}.

On April 1, 2004, Kōnu, along with the towns of Kisa, Mirasaka and Miwa, and the villages of Funo, Kimita and Sakugi (all from Futami District), was merged with the expanded city of Miyoshi and no longer exists as an independent municipality.

The main street of Kōnu also known as "Carter Street", named for US president Jimmy Carter after his visit in the 1990s.

== Places of interest ==
- Jimmy Carter Civic Center
- Susa Shrine
- Shoganji Temple
Official seal/emblem

Official flag
