= Kimita, Hiroshima =

Dissolved municipality in Hiroshima prefecture, Japan

Kimita (君田村, Kimita-son) was a village located in Futami District, Hiroshima Prefecture, Japan.

As of 2003, the village had an estimated population of 1,923 and a density of 22.39 persons per km^{2}. The total area was 85.87 km^{2}.

On April 1, 2004, Kimita, along with the towns of Kisa, Mirasaka and Miwa, the villages of Funo and Sakugi (all from Futami District), and the town of Kōnu (from Kōnu District), was merged with the expanded city of Miyoshi and no longer exists as an independent municipality.
