= Sakugi, Hiroshima =

Village in Futami, Hiroshima, Japan

Sakugi (作木村, Sakugi-son) was a village located in Futami District, Hiroshima Prefecture, Japan.

As of 2003, the village had an estimated population of 1,942 and a density of 21.13 inhabitants per square kilometre (54.7/sq mi). The total area was 91.92 km^{2} (35.49 sq mi).

On April 1, 2004, Sakugi, along with the towns of Kisa, Mirasaka and Miwa, the villages of Funo and Kimita (all from Futami District), and the town of Kōnu (from Kōnu District), was merged with the expanded city of Miyoshi and no longer exists as an independent municipality.
