= TS-Takata Circuit =

Racetrack in Akitakata, Hiroshima, Japan

Coordinates: 34.7491°N 132.7123°E

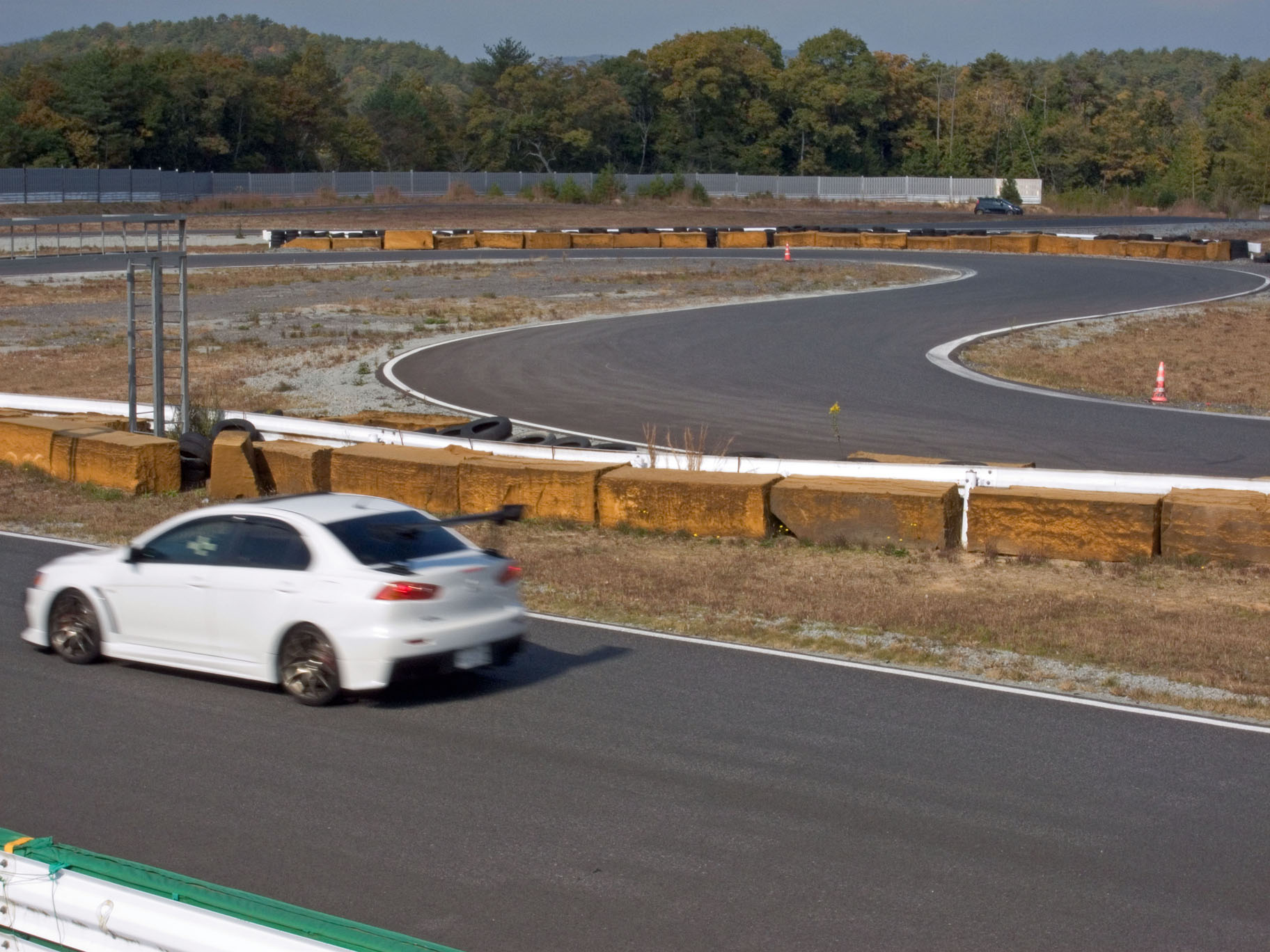
- Location: Akitakata, Hiroshima, Japan
- Opened: 2002
- Major events: All Japan Gymkhana Championship
- Length: 1.8 km (1.1 mi)

TS-Takata Circuit (TS-タカタサーキット) is a race track located in Akitakata, Hiroshima.

== History ==
TS-Takata Circuit opened in 2002 as a 1km long circuit, but in 2005 a more undulating layout was built increasing the circuit's length to 1.5km. In 2013 an extension of the track to the west was built, removing a chicane from the previous layout. The track was resurfaced and renovated in 2016.
