= Kisa, Hiroshima =

Dissolved municipality in Futami district, Hiroshima prefecture, Japan

Kisa (吉舎町, Kisa-chō) was a town located in Futami District, Hiroshima Prefecture, Japan.

As of 2003, the town had an estimated population of 4,918 and a density of 58.50 persons per km^{2}. The total area was 84.07 km^{2}.

On April 1, 2004, Kisa, along with the towns of Mirasaka and Miwa, the villages of Funo, Kimita and Sakugi (all from Futami District), and the town of Kōnu (from Kōnu District), was merged with the expanded city of Miyoshi and no longer exists as an independent municipality.

It was located 65 miles north-east of Hiroshima City. The town was divided into about a half dozen village level units, each with its own elementary and nursery schools. Okuda Genzo, a famous Japanese painter, was born in a small farmhouse in Kisa in the first half of the 20th century.

The town had a legend that it received its name when Emperor Go-Toba stopped off in Kisa on the way to an island in the Sea of Japan after he was sent there by the government for instigating a rebellion. Another theory is that it comes from kisaibe (Empress's estimate).
