= Mirasaka, Hiroshima =

Dissolved municipality in Hiroshima prefecture, Japan

Mirasaka (三良坂町, Mirasaka-chō) was a town located in Futami District, Hiroshima Prefecture, Japan.

As of 2003, the town has an estimated population of 3,801 and a density of 87.02 persons per km^{2}. The total area is 43.68 km^{2}.

On April 1, 2004, Mirasaka, along with the towns of Kisa and Miwa, the villages of Funo, Kimita and Sakugi (all from Futami District), and the town of Kōnu (from Kōnu District), was merged with the expanded city of Miyoshi into one, and no longer exists as an independent municipality.
