= Funo, Hiroshima =

Dissolved municipality in Hiroshima prefecture, Japan

Funo (布野村, Funo-son) was a village located in Futami District, Hiroshima Prefecture, Japan.

As of 2003, the village had an estimated population of 1,965 and a density of 23.66 persons per km^{2}. The total area was 83.04 km^{2}.

On April 1, 2004, Funo, along with the towns of Kisa, Mirasaka and Miwa, the villages of Kimita and Sakugi (all from Futami District), and the town of Kōnu (from Kōnu District), was merged with the expanded city of Miyoshi and no longer exists as an independent municipality.
