= Futami District, Hiroshima =

Former district in Hiroshima prefecture, Japan

Futami (双三郡, Futami-gun) was a district in Hiroshima, Japan. on April 1, 2004, all six towns and villages in this district, along with the town of Kōnu in Kōnu District, were merged with old Miyoshi to form the new Miyoshi.

As of 2003, the district has an estimated population of 18,171 and a density of 39.38 inhabitants per square kilometre (102.0/sq mi). The total area is 461.47 km^{2} (178.17 sq mi).

== Towns and villages ==
- Funo
- Kimita
- Kisa
- Mirasaka
- Miwa
- Sakugi
