= Shichikenjaya Station =

Railway station in Hiroshima, Japan

B 10 Shichikenjaya Station 七軒茶屋駅
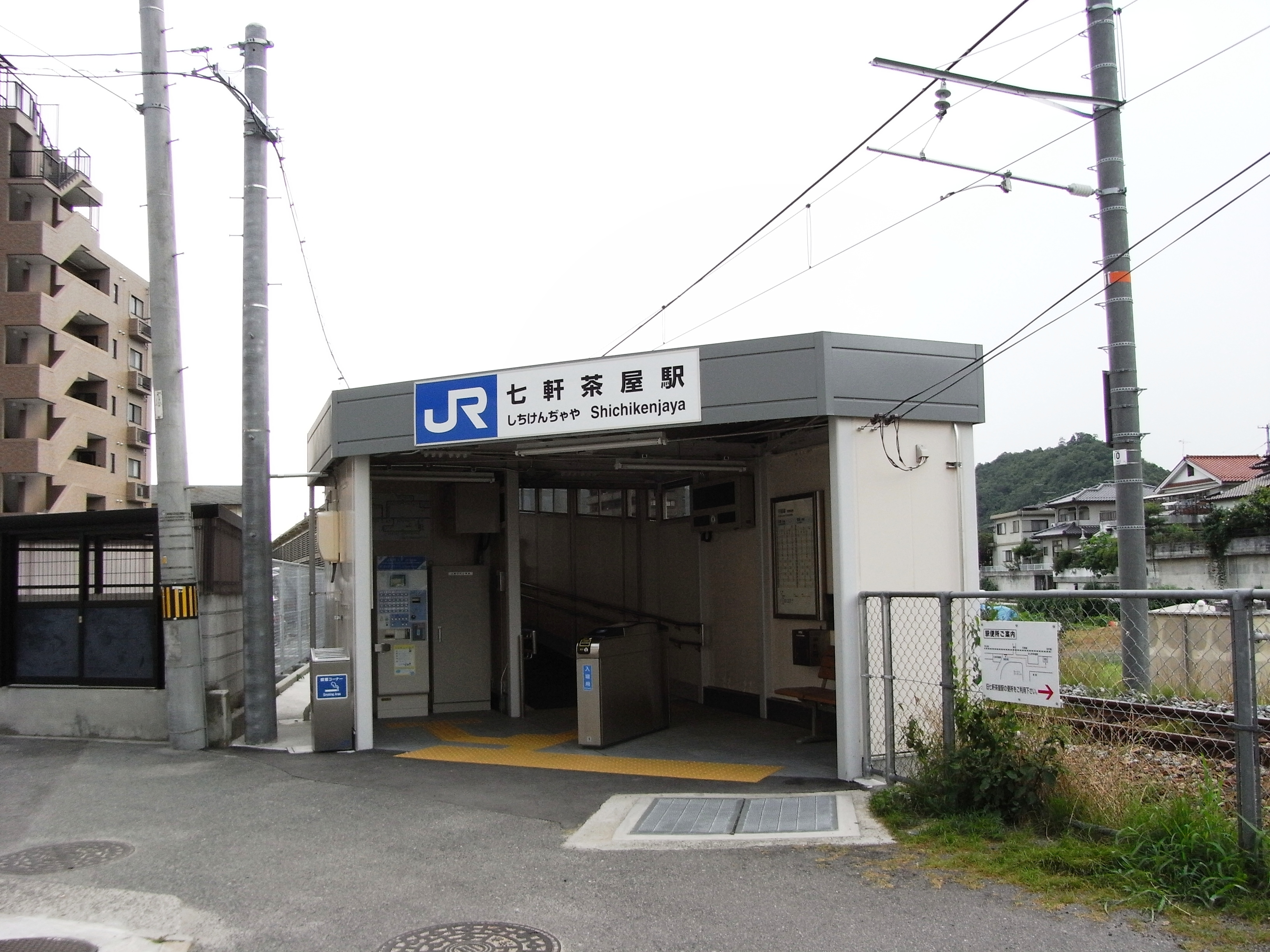
- Shichikenjaya Station building in July 2008

General information
- Location: 7 Chome-5 Midorii, Asaminami Ward, Hiroshima City, Hiroshima Prefecture; Japan
- Coordinates: 34°28′21.5″N 132°28′52.5″E
- Operator: JR West
- Line: B Kabe Line
- Platforms: 1 side platform
- Tracks: 1

Construction
- Structure type: At grade

Other information
- Station code: JR-B10
- Website: Official website

History
- Opened: December 25, 1910; 115 years ago

Passengers
- FY2020: 800 daily

Services
Preceding station	JR West	Following station
Bairin B 11 towards Aki-Kameyama	Kabe Line	Midorii B 09 towards Hiroshima
Location
- Location within Japan

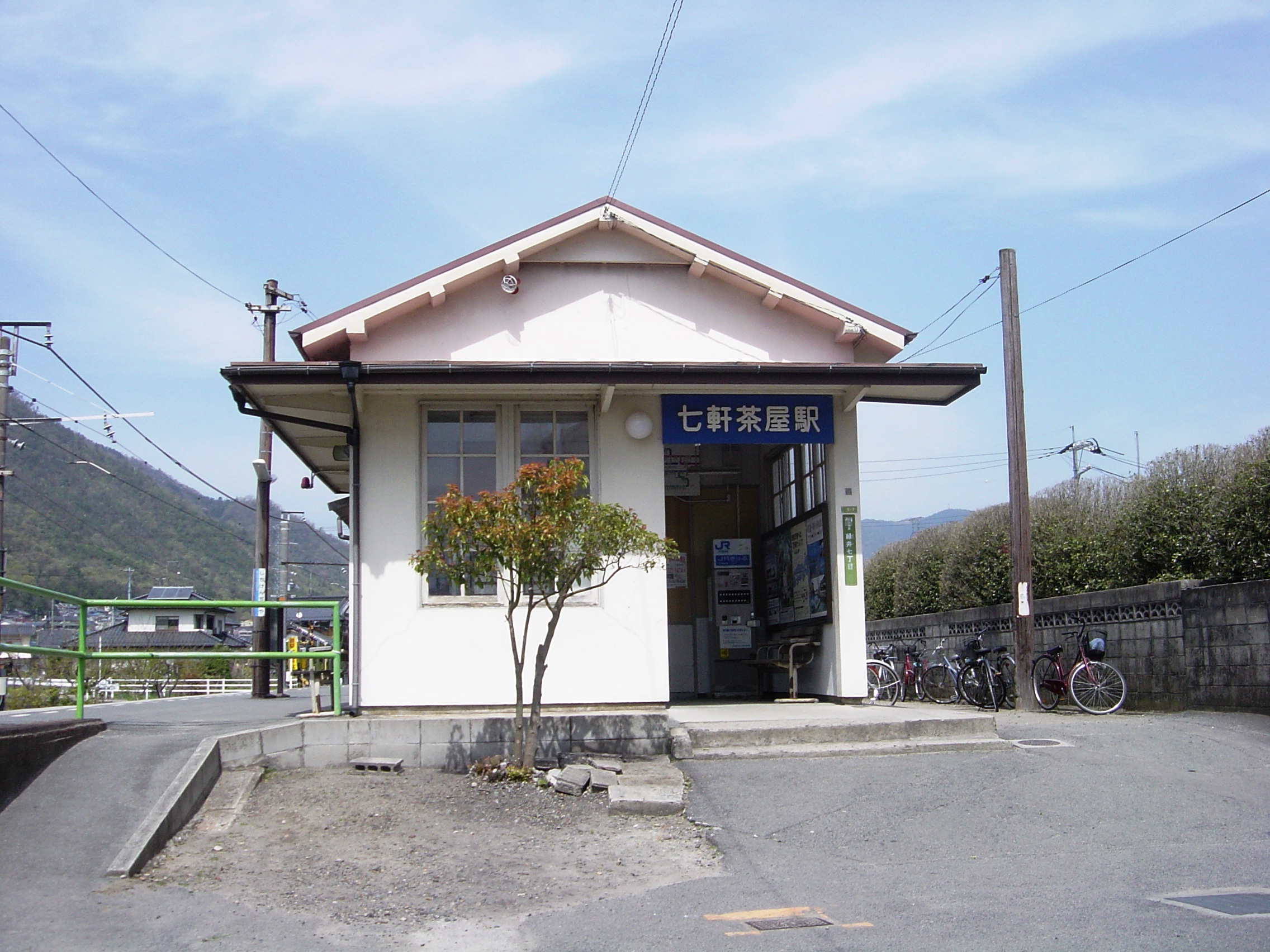
Station building in April 2005, replaced during platform extension

Shichikenjaya Station (七軒茶屋駅, Shichikenjaya-eki) is a JR West Kabe Line station located in Midorii, Asaminami-ku, Hiroshima, Hiroshima Prefecture, Japan.

== History ==
- December 25, 1910: Opened by extending the Japan Railway Hiroshima Branch Line (at that time) between Furuichibashi Station and Otagawa Bridge (current Kami-Yagi Station). Passenger station.
- March 11, 1919: The Hiroshima Branch Line of the Great Japan Railway is transferred to Kabe Railway, and becomes the company's station.
- May 1, 1926: Kabe Railway was merged with Hiroshima Electric and became the company's station.
- July 1, 1931: Hiroshima Electric Line is transferred to Hirohama Railway and becomes the company's station.
- September 1, 1936: Hirohama Railway nationalized.
- April 1, 1960: Japan Transport and Tourism Co., Ltd. entrusts station operations. Becomes a consignment station.
- May 1, 1973: National Railways (→JR) becomes a station in "Hiroshima City" in the specified metropolitan city system.
- April 1, 1987: West Japan Railway (JR West Japan) inherited by the division and privatization of the Japanese National Railways.
- October 2004: The business hours of the counter are changed and it will be open only on weekdays. In addition, the window will be closed during some hours during business hours.
- 2007:
  - July 29: ICOCA-compatible simplified automatic ticket gate installed.
  - September 1: IC card "ICOCA" will be available.
- March 15, 2008: Moved about 100m to Hiroshima, and the platform became compatible with 4-car trains. In addition, it will be an unstaffed station.
- August 20, 2014: A landslide occurred in Hiroshima City due to heavy rain in August 2014. The operation between Midorii Station and Kabe Station was suspended until August 31.

== Around the station ==
The station building is located on the right bank (west bank) of the Furukawa River, a tributary of the Otagawa River. On the west side, there is a mountainous area from Mt. Gongen (397 m above sea level) to Mt. Abu (Hiroshima Prefecture) (586 m above sea level), and there are few plains around the station. Some of the residential areas on the west side of the station are lined up on slopes facing the mountains, and this slope is thought to be an alluvial fan formed by repeated accumulations of earth and sand from past debris flows. Prefectural highway and National highway run parallel to the Kabe line on the east side of the station. In particular, roadside stores are located along the national highway, making it a major commercial area.

== Station layout ==
Shichikenjaya Station features one side platform handling one bidirectional track. The station is unstaffed, and contains an automatic ticket machine.

=== Platforms ===
1	■ Kabe Line	for Hiroshima, Kabe, Aki-Kameyama
