= Japan National Route 183 =

Road in Japan

National Route 183
- 国道183号
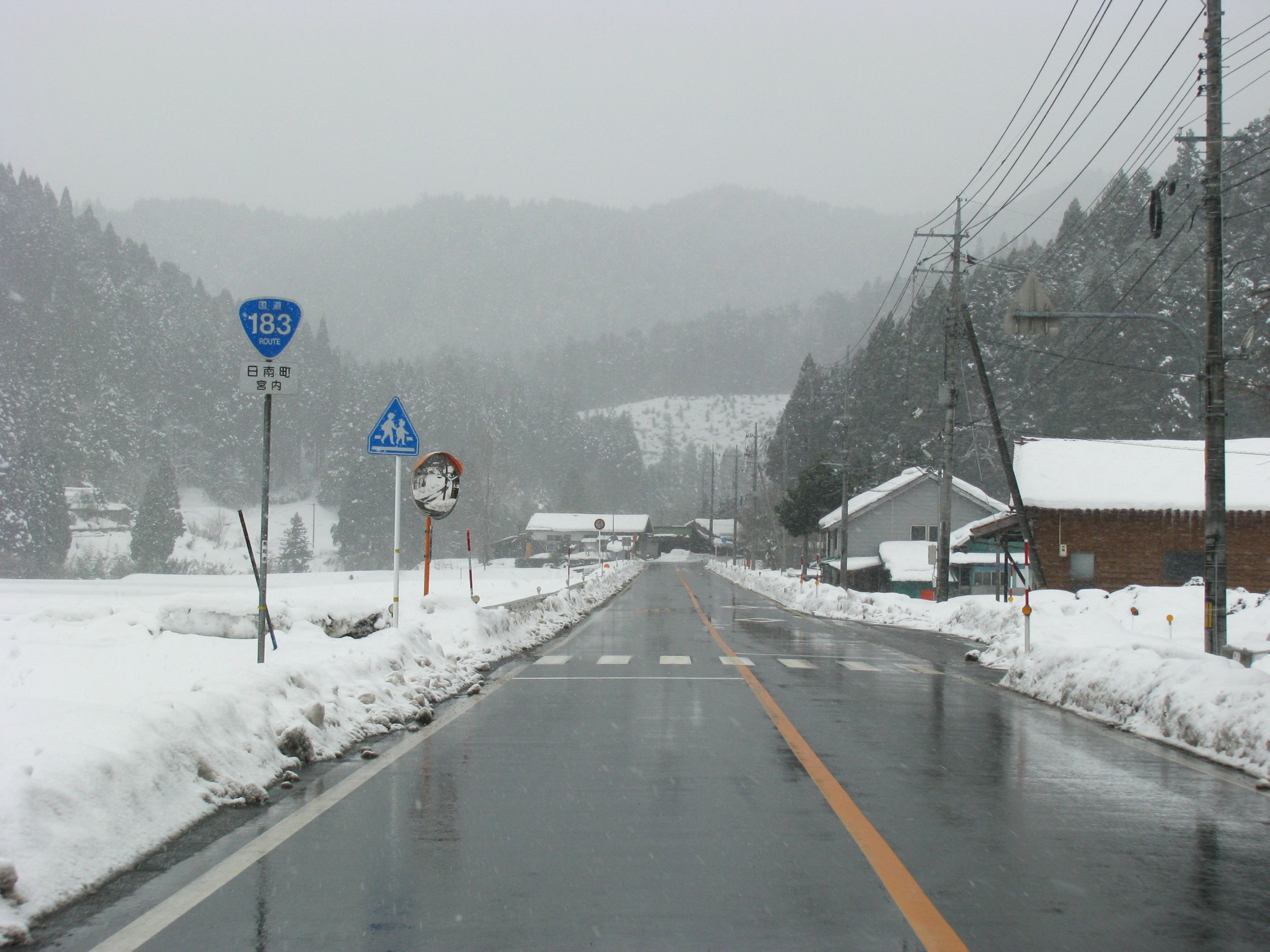

Route information
- Length: 196.4 km (122.0 mi)
- Existed: 18 May 1953–present

Major junctions
- North end: National Route 9 in Yonago
- South end: National Route 2 / National Route 54 in Naka-ku, Hiroshima

Location
- Country: Japan

Highway system
- National highways of Japan; Expressways of Japan
| ← National Route 182 | → National Route 184 |

National Route 183 is a national highway of Japan connecting Naka-ku, Hiroshima and Yonago in Japan, with a total length of 196.4 km (122.0 mi)
