= Japan National Route 184 =

National highway in Japan

National Route 184
- 国道184号
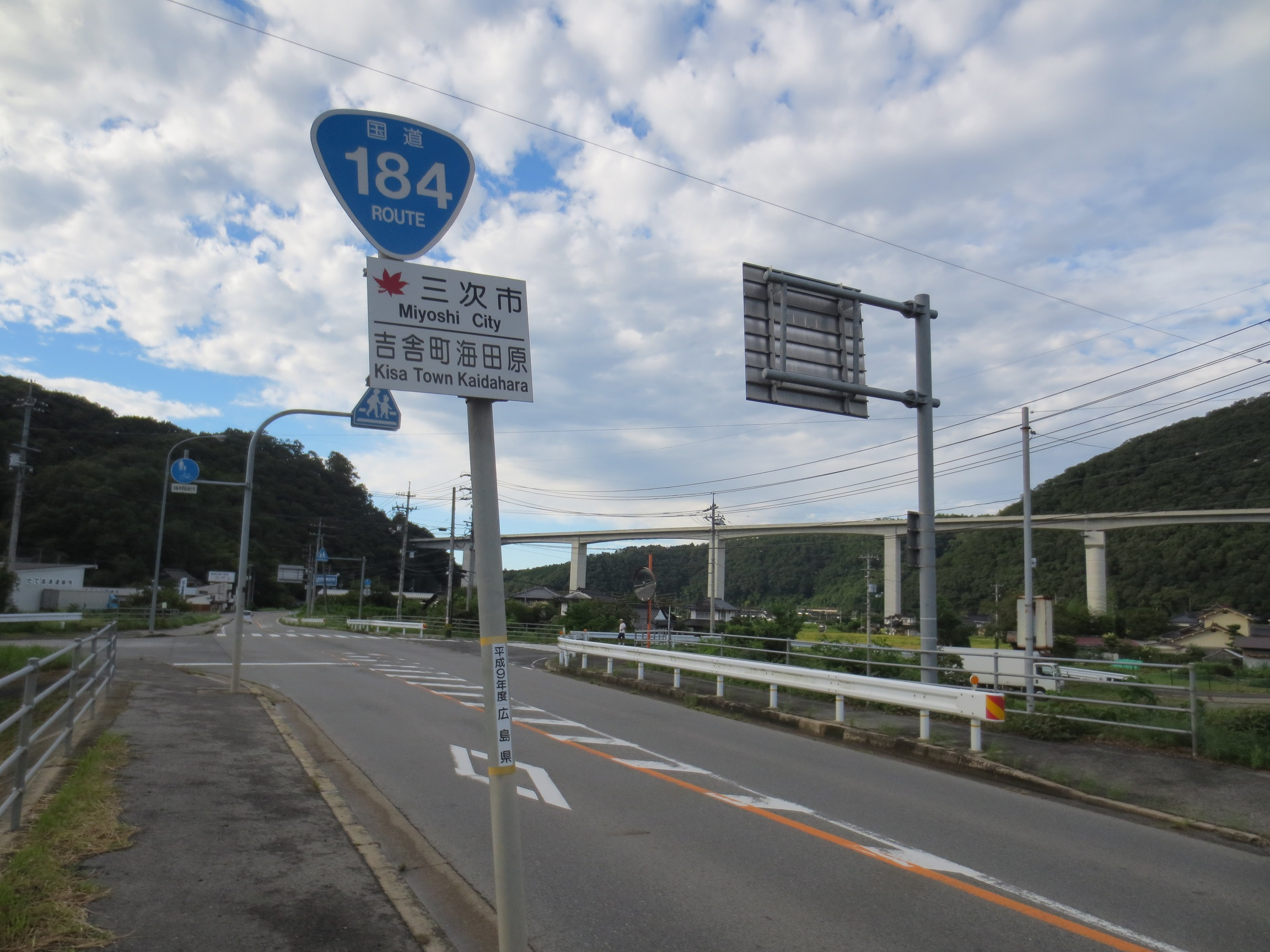

Route information
- Length: 203 km (126 mi)
- Existed: 18 May 1953–present

Major junctions
- North end: National Route 9 in Izumo
- South end: National Route 2 in Onomichi

Location
- Country: Japan

Highway system
- National highways of Japan; Expressways of Japan
← National Route 183	→ National Route 185

National Route 184 is a national highway of Japan connecting Izumo and Onomichi in Japan, with a total length of 203 km (126 mi).
