= Miyoshi Station (Hiroshima) =

Railway station in Miyoshi, Hiroshima Prefecture, Japan

Miyoshi Station 三次駅
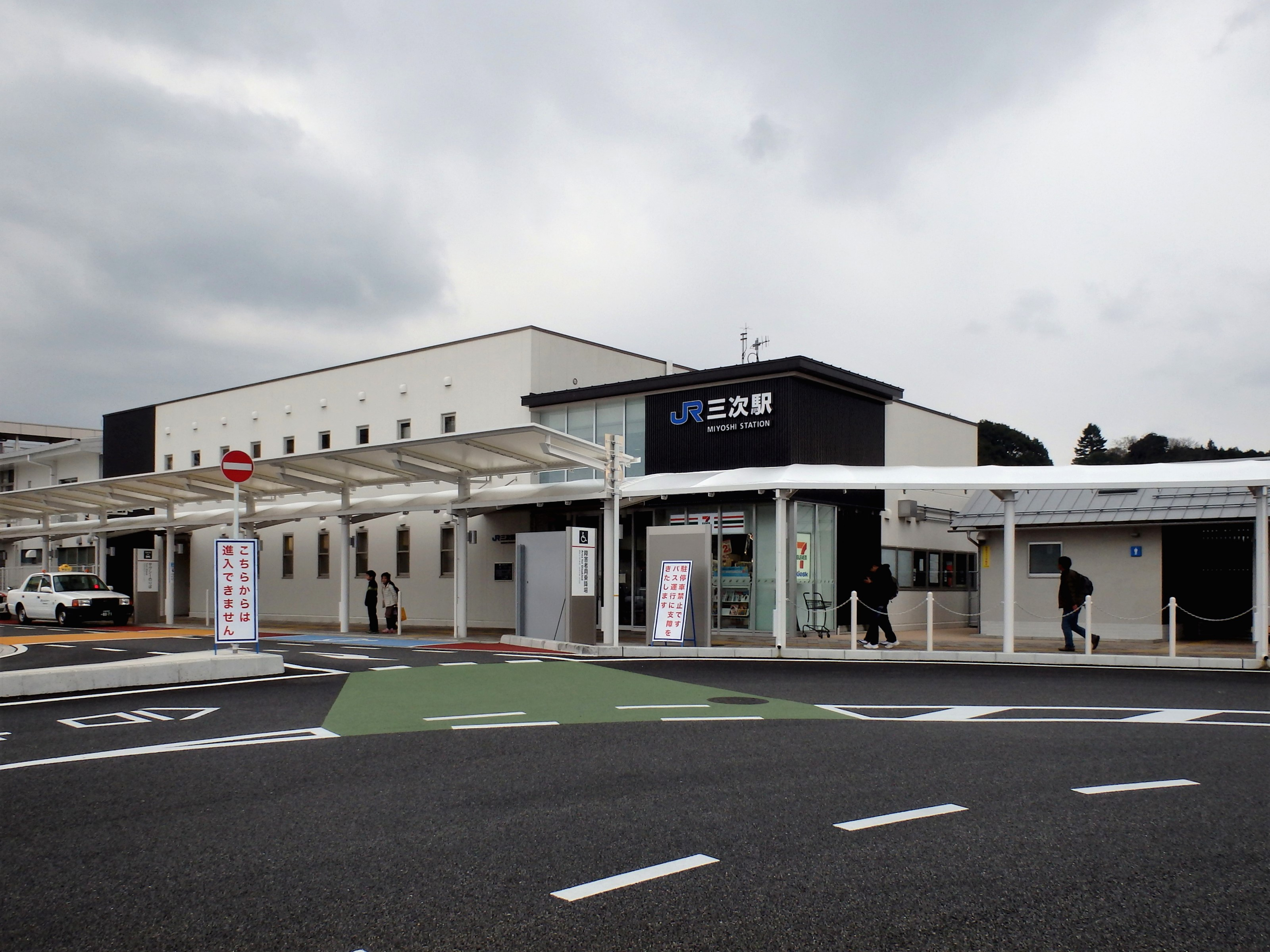
- Miyoshi Station in March 2016

General information
- Location: 1-1-1 Tōkaichi Minami, Miyoshi-shi, Hiroshima-ken 728-0014; Japan
- Coordinates: 34°48′10″N 132°51′21″E
- Operator: JR West
- Lines: P Geibi Line; Z Fukuen Line
- Distance: 90.3 km (56.1 miles) from Bitchū-Kōjiro
- Platforms: 1 side + 1 island platforms
- Connections: Bus terminal

Other information
- Status: Staffed ("Midori no Madoguchi" )
- Website: Official website

History
- Opened: 1 June 1933
- Former names: Tōkaichi (to 1933); Bingo Tōkaichi (until 1954)

Passengers
- FY2019: 433 daily
Location
- Location within Hiroshima Prefecture Location within Japan

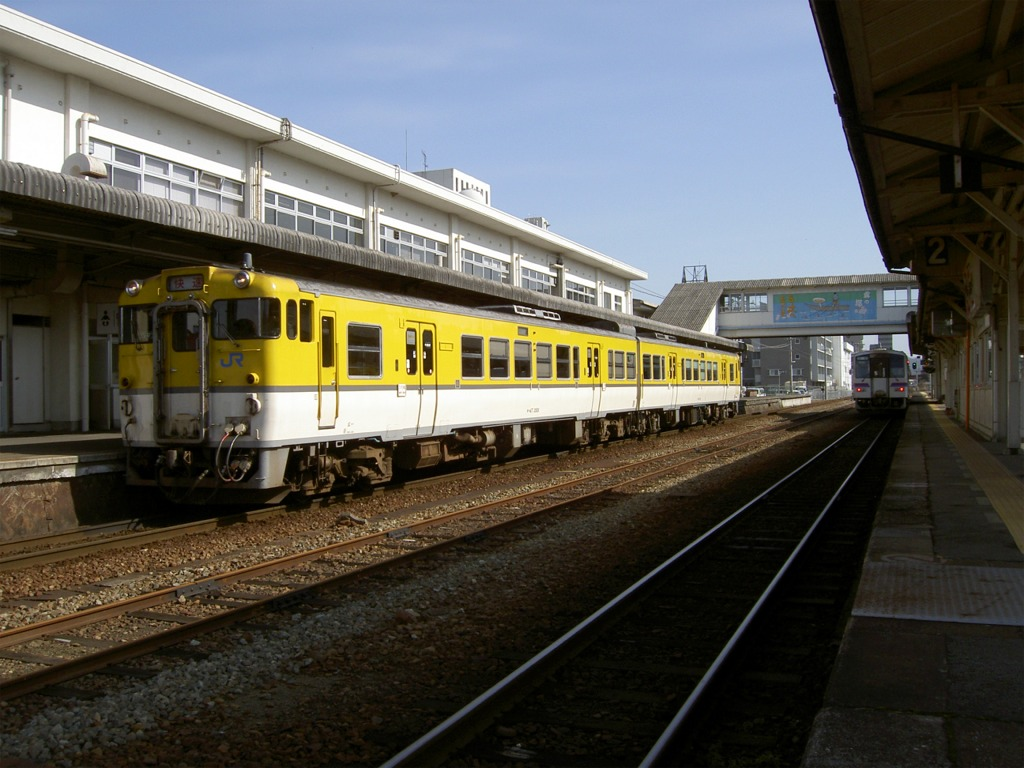
Miyoshi Station platform 1-2

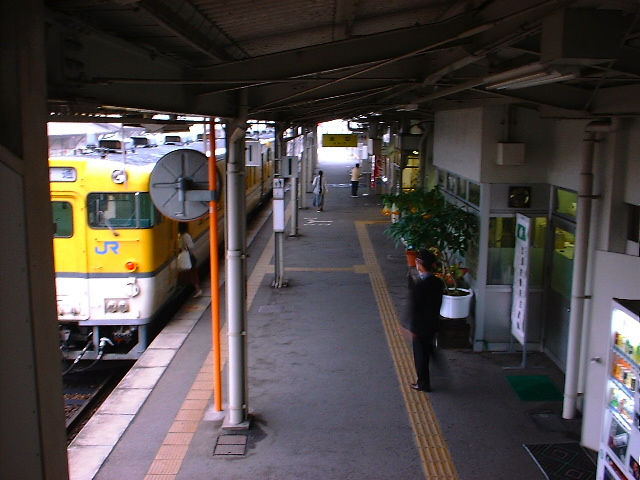
Miyoshi Station platform 1 from stairs to platforms 3-4

Miyoshi Station (三次駅, Miyoshi-eki) is a junction railway station located in the city of Miyoshi, Hiroshima, Japan. It is operated by West Japan Railway Company (JR West). Along with Niimi and Tsuyama Stations, Miyoshi is one of the major central region stations in the Chūgoku region of Japan.

== Lines ==
Miyoshi Station is served by the JR West Geibi Line, and is located 90.3 kilometers from the terminus of the line at Bitchū-Kōjiro and 96.7 kilometers from Niimi. It is also the terminus for the Fukuen Line to Fukuyama. It was also the terminal station for the Sankō Line before the line ceased operation on 31 March 2018.

== Station layout ==
Miyoshi Station is a reinforced concrete two-story building. It features two platforms which handle four lines: one side platform next to the station building and an island platform accessible via an enclosed footbridge above the tracks. The station building houses a small convenience store as well as automatic ticket vending machines and a "Midori no Madoguchi" staffed ticket office. There is a large waiting area inside the station building, as well as enclosed and unenclosed waiting areas on the platforms. There is a siding track without a platform between Platform 1 and Platform 2, and there are many train sidings on the south side of Platform 3. In the past, there was a notched platform on the Hiroshima side of the side platform that served as Platform 0 for trains on the Sanko Line.

=== Platforms ===
1	■ P Geibi Line	for Hiroshima
1	■ P Geibi Line	for Bingo-Ochiai
3	■ Z Fukuen Line	for Fuchū

== Adjacent stations ==
«	Service	»
Geibi Line
Terminus	Rapid Miyoshi Liner	Kōtachi
Yatsugi	Local	Nishi Miyoshi
Fukuen Line
Yatsugi	Local	Terminus

== History ==
The station opened on 1 June 1933, initially named Bingo Tōkaichi Station (備後十日市駅). On 10 December 1954, the station was renamed Miyoshi. With the privatization of Japanese National Railways (JNR) on 1 April 1987, the station came under the control of JR West.

The turntable located next to the station was sold to the private railway operator Tobu Railway in 2016, and installed next to Kinugawa-Onsen Station in Tochigi Prefecture for use by steam-hauled tourist trains.

The station was a terminal station of the Sankō Line. On 16 October 2015, JR West announced that it was considering closing the Sankō Line due to poor patronage. On 29 September 2016, JR West announced that the entire rail line would close on 31 March 2018. The line then closed on March 31, 2018, with an event hosted by JR West and will be replaced by a bus service.

== Passenger statistics ==
In fiscal 2019, the station was used by an average of 433 passengers daily.

== Surrounding area ==
- Miyoshi Post Office
- Miyoshi CC Plaza shopping center
- Sungreen shopping center
- Miyoshi Municipal Tōkaichi Junior High School
- Miyoshi Municipal Tōkaichi Elementary School
- Basen River
- Gōno River
- Chūgoku Expressway Miyoshi Interchange
- National Route 183
- National Route 375

== See also ==
- List of railway stations in Japan
