= List of mergers in Hiroshima Prefecture =

Here is a list of mergers in Hiroshima Prefecture, Japan since the Heisei era.

== Mergers from April 1, 1999 to Present ==
- On February 3, 2003 - the town of Shin'ichi (from Ashina District), and the town of Utsumi (from Numakuma District) were merged into the expanded city of Fukuyama. Ashina District was dissolved as a result of this merger.
- On March 1, 2003 - the town of Saeki, and the village of Yoshiwa (both from Saeki District) were merged into the expanded city of Hatsukaichi.
- On April 1, 2003 - the towns of Ōsaki, Higashino and Kinoe (all from Toyota District) were merged to create the town of Ōsakikamijima.
- On April 1, 2003 - the town of Shimokamagari (from Aki District) was merged into the expanded city of Kure.
- On March 1, 2004 - the towns of Kōta, Midori, Mukaihara, Takamiya, Yachiyo and Yoshida (all from Takata District) were merged to create the city of Akitakata. Takata District was dissolved as a result of this merger.
- On April 1, 2004 - the old city of Miyoshi absorbed the towns of Kisa, Mirasaka and Miwa, the villages of Funo, Kimita and Sakugi (all from Futami District), and the town of Kōnu (from Kōnu District) to create the new and expanded city of Miyoshi. Futami District was dissolved as a result of this merger.
- On April 1, 2004 - the town of Jōge (from Kōnu District) was merged into the expanded city of Fuchū.
- On April 1, 2004 - the town of Kawajiri (from Toyota District) was merged into the expanded city of Kure.
- On October 1, 2004 - the towns of Kōzan and Seranishi (both from Sera District) were merged into the expanded town of Sera.
- On October 1, 2004 - the towns of Kake and Togouchi, and the village of Tsutsuga (all from Yamagata District) were merged to create the town of Akiōta.
- On November 1, 2004 - the town of Etajima (from Aki District) absorbed the towns of Nōmi, Ōgaki and Okimi (all from Saeki District) to create the city of Etajima.
- On November 5, 2004 - the towns of Jinseki, Sanwa and Yuki, and the village of Toyomatsu (all from Jinseki District) were merged to create the town of Jinsekikōgen. With this merger, all villages in Hiroshima Prefecture have been dissolved.
- On February 1, 2005 - the towns of Chiyoda, Geihoku, Ōasa and Toyohira (all from Yamagata District) were merged to create the town of Kitahiroshima.
- On February 1, 2005 - the town of Numakuma (from Numakuma District) was merged into the expanded city of Fukuyama. Numakuma District was dissolved as a result of this merger.
- On February 7, 2005 - the towns of Fukutomi, Kōchi, Kurose and Toyosaka (all from Kamo District), and the town of Akitsu (from Toyota District) were merged into the expanded city of Higashihiroshima.
- On March 20, 2005 - the towns of Kurahashi, Kamagari and Ondo (all from Aki District) and the towns of Toyohama, Yasuura and Yutaka (from Toyota District) were merged into the expanded city of Kure.
- On March 22, 2005 - the old city of Mihara absorbed the town of Daiwa (from Kamo District), the town of Kui (from Mitsugi District), and the town of Hongō (from Toyota District) to create the new and expanded city of Mihara. Kamo District was dissolved as a result of this merger.
- On March 28, 2005 - the towns of Mitsugi and Mukaishima (both from Mitsugi District) were merged into the expanded city of Onomichi. Mitsugi District was dissolved as a result of this merger.
- On March 31, 2005 - the old city of Shōbara absorbed the towns of Hiwa, Kuchiwa, Saijō, Takano and Tōjō (from Hiba District), and the town of Sōryō (from Kōnu District) to create the new and expanded city of Shōbara. Hiba District and Kōnu District were both dissolved as a result of this merger.
- On April 25, 2005 - the town of Yuki (from Saeki District) was merged into the expanded city of Hiroshima, now specifically as part of Saeki Ward.
- On November 3, 2005 - the towns of Miyajima and Ōno (both from Saeki District) were merged into the expanded city of Hatsukaichi. Saeki District was dissolved as a result of this merger.
- On January 10, 2006 - the city of Innoshima, and the town of Setoda (from Toyota District) were merged into the expanded city of Onomichi.
- On March 1, 2006 - the town of Kannabe (from Fukayasu District) was merged into the expanded city of Fukuyama. Fukayasu District was dissolved as a result of this merger.
