= Hiwa Museum of Natural History =

- 庄原市立比和自然科学博物館
- Interactive map of the Hiwa Museum of Natural History area

General information
- Location: 1119-1 Hiwa, Hiwa-chō, Shōbara, Hiroshima Prefecture, Japan
- Coordinates: 34°58′59″N 132°59′10″E
- Opened: September 1951

Website
- Official website

Hiwa Museum of Natural History (庄原市立比和自然科学博物館, Shōbara Shiritsu Hiwa Shizen Kagaku Hakubutsukan) or Hiwa Natural Science Museum is a museum of the natural sciences in Shōbara, Hiroshima Prefecture, Japan.

== History ==
The museum first opened in the former town of Hiwa, now merged into the city of Shōbara, in 1951, as the Hiwa Science Museum (比和町立科学博物館). Initially located on the premises of Hiwa Junior School, the Museum became a museum-equivalent facility and then a registered museum in 1952. In 1956, it relocated to the premises of the Prefectural Shōbara Vocational High School, Hiwa Branch; then, after deregistration in 1958, in 1962 to the premises of the Hiwa Chūō Kōminkan. In 1989, with the demolition of the public hall, the Museum temporarily closed its doors while work began on the construction of a new dedicated facility. In March 1990, construction work was completed; the Museum reopened as the Hiwa Museum of Natural History (比和町立自然科学博物館) in September of the same year. A "Discovery Room" and storage facility was added to the complex in 2001, and in 2005 the Museum again became a registered museum. In 2005, with the merger of Hiwa into the expanded city of Shōbara, the Museum officially became the Shōbara City Hiwa Museum of Natural History (庄原市立比和自然科学博物館). In 2012, the earth sciences and geology annex opened.

== Publications ==
- Miscellaneous Reports of the Hiwa Museum for Natural History (比和科学博物館研究報告) (1958—)

== See also ==
- Hiroshima Prefectural Museum of History
