= Shigeki Tanaka =

Japanese long-distance runner (1931–2022)

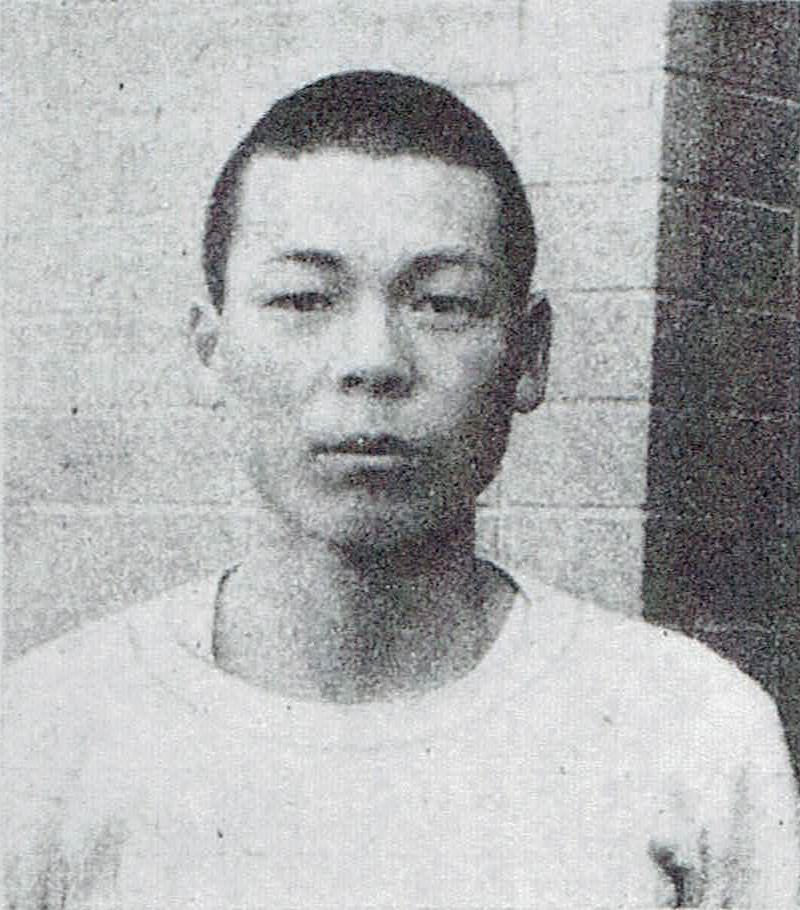
- Shigeki Tanaka
- Born: 1931; Shobara, Hiroshima, Japan
- Died: October 4, 2022 (aged 90–91)

Shigeki Tanaka (田中 茂樹, Tanaka Shigeki; 1931 – October 4, 2022) was a Japanese long-distance runner who won the 1951 Boston Marathon.

== Early life ==
Tanaka was born in 1931.

Tanaka was 13 and living 20 miles from Hiroshima at the time of the 1945 Hiroshima atomic bombing. Following his Boston Marathon victory, he recalled, "We saw a bright light and heard a little noise. But no one thought anything about it at the time ... three days later, we heard the terrible news."

He laid the groundwork for his career as a marathon runner by running 20 km from Shōbara to a Saijō municipal stadium as a high school student. He was a first-year student at Nihon University at the time of the Boston Marathon.

== 1951 Boston Marathon ==
Japanese athletes had been barred from the 1948 Summer Olympics in London and from all major international competitions after World War II. The 1951 Boston Marathon was only the second post-World War II athletic competition, after the 1951 Asian Games held a month earlier, to invite Japanese athletes. Tanaka was one of four Japanese runners invited to compete by Will Cloney of the Boston Athletic Association. The others were Japan's national champion Shunji Koyunagi, Yoshitaka Uchikawa, and Hiromi Haigo. At the time, Tanaka was 20 years old, and weighed 118 pounds. The runners stopped in Hawaii, San Francisco, and New York City en route to Boston. In each stopover they went to a movie theater and people wrapped money in paper and threw it on stage for them. Tanaka later recalled that he "felt pretty strange to receive money like that, like a beggar almost ... We bought sugar to bring back to Japan—that's how bad things were."

The four were given a welcoming ceremony arranged by servicemen at the Charlestown Naval Shipyard. Because Tanaka was from Hiroshima, The Boston Globe nicknamed him "atomic boy", which he found "a burden". Tanaka later recalled that people in the United States welcomed them warmly and both Japanese and Americans cheered him during the race.

Tanaka became the Boston Marathon's first Japanese winner. He won the event in 2:27:45, the third-fastest time in the event's history to that point. He took the lead on Heartbreak Hill and led convincingly with four miles to go. Observers expected him to break Suh Yun-bok's 1947 course record, but following his pre-race plans, Tanaka stuck to his own schedule; he did not push himself and finished comfortably. After the race, he stated through an interpreter, "I did not plan a record-breaking race, I ran only to win."

Tanaka won the marathon racing in tabi-inspired split-toe running shoes made by Onitsuka, which he thought would give him better traction.

The three other Japanese runners in the race also did very well: Shunji Koyunagi finished in 5th place, Yoshitaka Uchikawa in 8th place, and Hiromi Haigo in 9th place.

=== Reception and legacy ===
Tanaka's win inspired in Japan an enduring enthusiasm for distance running and an affection for the Boston Marathon. His win was a landmark moment in restoring the war-shattered country's dignity and honor following World War II. The race and Tanaka's victory marked the beginning of a strong athletic relationship between Japan and Boston, and the beginning of a tradition of Japanese victories in the race.

== Post-running career ==
After his running career, Tanaka worked as a salaryman for a Tokyo area department store and served as a director at the Japanese Amateur Athletics Federation until his retirement. Tanaka died on October 4, 2022.

== Medal theft ==
On May 5, 1998, Tanaka's house in Utsunomiya was ransacked and his Boston Marathon winner's medal stolen. The Boston Athletic Association awarded Tanaka a replacement medal on July 10, 1998, for his achievement as the first Japanese to win the event; the association's president Frank Porter said in a message accompanying the medal that Tanaka's victory was the beginning of Japan's strength in the race.

The stolen medal was recovered in a police raid on July 22, 1998. A 19-year-old Brazilian of Japanese ancestry was arrested on suspicion of stealing the medal and on unrelated theft and assault charges. During questioning, the suspect implicated himself in an unrelated murder and was arrested on suspicion of that crime.

The two medals were subsequently displayed at the National Stadium in Tokyo. Tanaka presented the Boston Athletic Association with a "trophy of friendship" on behalf of the town of Saijō in gratitude for replacing the stolen medal.
