= Kunikane River =

River in Japan

The Kunikane River (国兼川, Kunikane-gawa) is a river in Japan which flows from Lake Kunikane in Shōbara in Hiroshima Prefecture.
