= Bingo Province =

Former province of Japan

Map of Japanese provinces (1868) with Bingo Province highlighted

Bingo Province (備後国, Bingo no Kuni; Japanese pronunciation: [bíŋ̀.ɡò̞ (nò̞ kɯ̈̀.ɲ̟ì), -ŋò̞ (nò̞ kɯ̈̀.ɲ̟ì)]) was a province of Japan on the Inland Sea side of western Honshū, comprising what is today the eastern part of Hiroshima Prefecture. It was sometimes grouped together with Bizen and Bitchu Provinces as Bishū (備州). The 備 bi in the names of these provinces is taken from the second character in the name of Kibi Province, whose ambit also included the area that would be divided off as Mimasaka Province in the early 8th century CE. Bingo bordered Bitchū, Hōki, Izumo, Iwami, and Aki Provinces.

The ancient capital is believed to have been in the vicinity of the city of Fuchu. During the Sengoku Period, Bingo was part of the Mori clan's domains, but after the Battle of Sekigahara, Tokugawa Ieyasu reassigned it to one of his allies.

A notable landmark includes Fukuyama Castle, which was the main castle of the Bingo-Fukuyama han (clan) during the Edo period of Japanese history.

== Shrines and temples ==
Kibitsu jinja was the chief Shinto shrine (ichinomiya) of Bingo.

== Historical districts ==
- Hiroshima Prefecture
  - Ashida District (芦田郡) - merged with Hōnji District to become Ashina District (芦品郡) on October 1, 1898
  - Eso District (恵蘇郡) - merged with Mikami and Nuka Districts to become Hiba District (比婆郡) on October 1, 1898
  - Fukatsu District (深津郡) - merged with Yasuna District to become Fukayasu District (深安郡) on October 1, 1898
  - Hōnji District (品治郡) - merged with Ashida District to become Ashina District on October 1, 1898
  - Jinseki District (神石郡)
  - Kōnu District (甲奴郡) - dissolved
  - Mikami District (三上郡) - merged with Eso and Nuka Districts to become Hiba District on October 1, 1898
  - Mitani District (三谿郡) - merged with Miyoshi District to become Futami District (双三郡) on October 1, 1898
  - Mitsugi District (御調郡) - dissolved
  - Miyoshi District (三次郡) - merged with Mitani District to become Futami District on October 1, 1898
  - Nuka District (奴可郡) - merged with Eso and Mikami Districts to become Hiba District on October 1, 1898
  - Numakuma District (沼隈郡) - dissolved
  - Sera District (世羅郡)
  - Yasuna District (安那郡) - merged with Fukatsu District to become Fukayasu District on October 1, 1898
  - Yoshikatana District (吉刀郡)

== See also ==
- Fukuyama Domain
