= Kusado Sengen =

Medieval Japanese town ruins

- 草戸千軒 (Japanese)
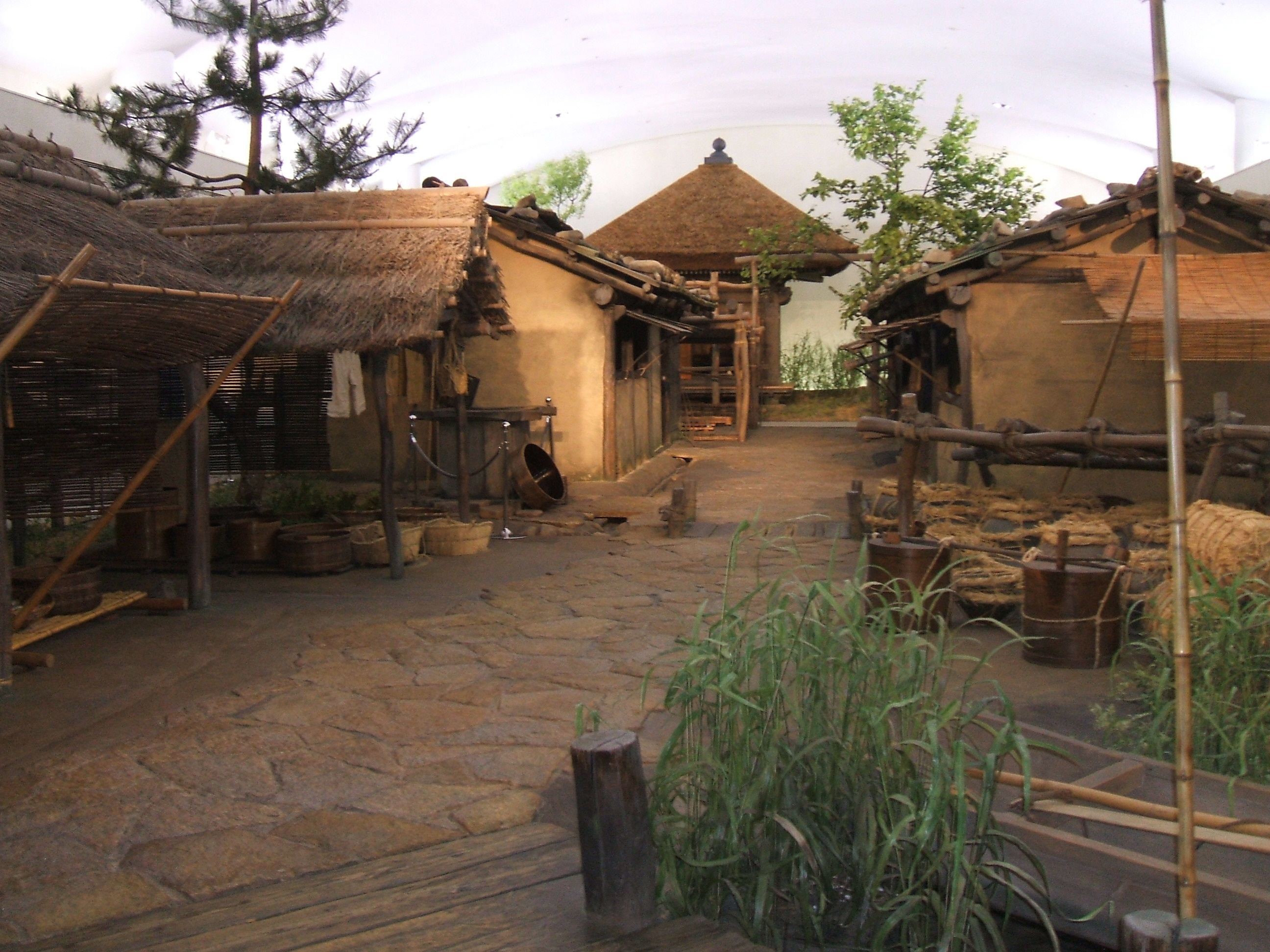
- Reconstruction of the town at the Hiroshima Prefectural Museum of History

- Location within Japan
- 34°28′30″N 133°21′00″E
- Type: Settlement
- Periods: Medieval
- Location: Fukuyama, Hiroshima Prefecture, Japan
- Region: Chūgoku

Kusado Sengen (草戸千軒, kusado sengen) is the name of a medieval town in Japan. It is located near the Ashida River in present-day Fukuyama City, Hiroshima Prefecture. Investigators believe that Kusado Sengen was a minor commercial port town on the Seto Inland Sea during the Kamakura and Muromachi periods. Exhibits and a reconstruction may be found at the Hiroshima Prefectural Museum of History.

== Discovery ==
Kusado Sengen was discovered in 1961 when a large quantity of pottery, porcelain and gravestones were discovered while attempting to re-route the Ashida River. Many historians believed that it was the site of a medieval town named Kusado Sengen. Excavation was not carried out, and the site was buried by a sandbank in the re-routed river.

== Excavation ==
Excavation of the site was started in 1961 by the Fukuyama Municipal Board of Education. Several items dating back to the Kamakura and Muromachi Periods were found, and it became obvious that the site was indeed Kusado Sengen. The Ministry of Construction planned river improvements and the construction of a dam. These plans caused the possibility that the sandbank on which the site was located might be destroyed or completely submerged. Serious and long-term investigations therefore became urgently necessary. Accordingly, the Hiroshima Prefectural Institute for the Kusado Sengen-cho Site Investigations was founded in 1973 as a research unit within the Hiroshima Prefectural Board of Education.

Many of the finds from the site that have been excavated are waterlogged and reasonably well preserved. Finds include wells, pits for garbage dumping, ditches, ponds, graves, and a wide range of objects such as pottery, wooden objects, stone objects, metal objects, bone tools, fabrics, and organic remains.

Pottery was very common amongst the finds at the site, the most common being earthenware. A great deal of imported pottery from Vietnam, Korea and China was found with it.

Many kinds of wooden objects were discovered. The majority of them were for daily activities such as eating and storage.

Lacquer ware bowls and dishes are regarded as common tableware in the town. These are believed to have been produced in the town, since a lot of lacquering tools were excavated from the site. On many of the lacquer vessels there are designs of living things such as birds and plants.

Other finds include coins and carpenters' tools.

== See also ==
- List of Historic Sites of Japan (Hiroshima)
