= Ashina District, Hiroshima =

Former district in Hiroshima prefecture, Japan

(Japan > Hiroshima Prefecture > Ashina District)

Ashina (芦品郡, Ashina-gun) was one of the districts located in Hiroshima Prefecture until 2003. The district was created on October 1, 1898, when both Ashida and Honji districts merged. On February 3, 2003, the last town, Shin'ichi (新市町; -chō) was merged into Fukuyama and the district dissolved. Currently, the district is now part of the cities of Fukuyama and Fuchū, and the town of Jinsekikōgen in Jinseki District.

== The towns and villages at the time of the creation of Ashina District (as of October 1, 1898) ==
※○ is for the towns and villages of Ashida District and ● is for the towns and villages of Honji District.

- ○Fuchū (府中町)
- ○Aji (阿字村)
- ●Abiki (網引村)
- ○Arima (有磨村)
- ○Iwatani (岩谷村)
- ●Era (江良村)
- ○Kawasa (河佐村)
- ○Kinoyama (木野山村)
- ●Kuramitsu (倉光村)
- ○Kuribu (栗生村)
- ○Kuwagi (桑木村)
- ○Kokufu (国府村)
- ●Shin'ichi (新市村)
- ●Chikata (近田村)
- ○Tsunekanemaru (常金丸村)
- ○Deguchi (出口村)
- ●Tode (戸手村)
- ●Nakashima (中島村)
- ●Hattori (服部村)
- ○Hirotani (広谷村)
- ○Fukusō (福相村)
- ○Fujio (藤尾村)
- ●Bōji (坊寺村)
- ●Managura (万能倉村)
- ○Mukabagi (行縢村)
- ●Mubeyama (宜山村)

(Total of 1 town and 25 villages)

== Timeline ==
- October 1, 1898 The district formed by the mergers of both Ashida and Honji Districts (1 town, 25 villages).
- January 1, 1907 The village of Shin'ichi gained town status to become the town of Shin'ichi (2 towns, 24 villages).
- February 1, 1913 The villages of Kinoyama, Kuwagi, and Mukabagi merged to form the village of Taishō (2 towns, 22 villages).
- July 1, 1913 The village of Deguchi gained town status to become the town of Deguchi (3 towns, 21 villages).
- July 1, 1913 The villages of Era, Kuramitsu, Nakashima, Bōji, and Managura merged to form the village of Ekiya (3 towns, 17 villages).
- April 1, 1923 The town of Fuchū absorbed parts of Habu (土生) in the village of Kuribu (3 towns, 17 villages).
- February 1, 1925 The towns of Deguchi and Fuchū merged to form the town of Fuchū (2 towns, 17 villages).
- November 3, 1947 The village of Ekiya gained town status to become the town of Ekiya (3 towns, 16 villages).
- April 1, 1949 The village of Shimokawabe from Mitsugi District merged into Ashina District (3 towns, 17 villages).
- July 1, 1949 The town of Takabuchi from Jinseki District (now the town of Jinsekikōgen) absorbs Kuwagi from the village of Taishō (3 towns, 17 villages).
- September 1, 1949 The town of Shin'ichi absorbs Sagata (相方) from the village of Fukusō (3 towns, 17 villages).
- March 31, 1954 The town of Fuchū and the villages of Iwatani, Kuribu, Kokufu, Shimokawabe, and Hirotani merged and gained city status to become the city of Fuchū (2 towns, 12 villages).
- January 1, 1955 The town of Ekiya and the villages of Chikata, Hattori, and Mubeyama merged to form the town of Ekiya (2 towns, 9 villages).
- February 1, 1955 The town of Shin'ichi and the villages of Abiki, Tsunekanemaru, and Tode merged to form the town of Shin'ichi (2 towns, 6 villages).
- March 17, 1955 The villages of Aji and Taishō each absorbs parts of Tobe in the town of Jōge in Kōnu District (now the city of Fuchū) (2 towns, 6 villages).
- March 31, 1955 The villages of Aji and Taishō merged to form the village of Kyōwa (共和村, changed the Kanji to "協和村" during the same day) (2 towns, 5 villages).
- April 1, 1955 The villages of Arima and Fukusō merged to form the town of Ashida. (3 towns, 3 villages).
- September 30, 1956 The village of Kawasa merged into the city of Fuchū (3 towns, 2 villages).
- September 30, 1956 The town of Ekiya absorbed Hōjōji in village of Kahō from Fukayasu District all but the parts of the areas merged into the town of Kamo in Fukayasu District (parts of Torigoe) (now the city of Fukuyama) (3 towns, 2 villages).
- July 1, 1959 The village of Fujio splits and merged into the town of Shin'ichi and the town of Sanwa in Jinseki District (now the town of Jinsekikōgen) (3 towns, 1 village).
- April 1, 1974 The town of Ashida merged into the city of Fukuyama (2 towns, 1 village).
- February 1, 1975 The town of Ekiya merged into the city of Fukuyama (1 town, 1 village).
- February 1, 1975 The village of Kyōwa merged into the city of Fuchū (1 town).
- February 3, 2003 The city of Fukuyama absorbs the town of Shin'ichi. Ashina District dissolved as a result.

== See also ==
- List of dissolved districts of Japan
