= Hirako =

Hirako (written: 平子) is a Japanese surname. Notable people with the surname include:

- Hiroki Hirako (平子 裕基, born 1982), Japanese speed skater
- Risa Hirako (平子 理沙, born 1971), Japanese model

== See also ==
- Hirako Station, a railway station in Shōbara, Hiroshima Prefecture, Japan
