= Yuki, Hiroshima =

Yuki, Hiroshima may refer to:

- Yuki, Hiroshima (Saeki), Japan
- Yuki, Hiroshima (Jinseki), Japan
