= Taka Station =

Railway station in Shōbara, Hiroshima Prefecture, Japan

Taka Station 高駅
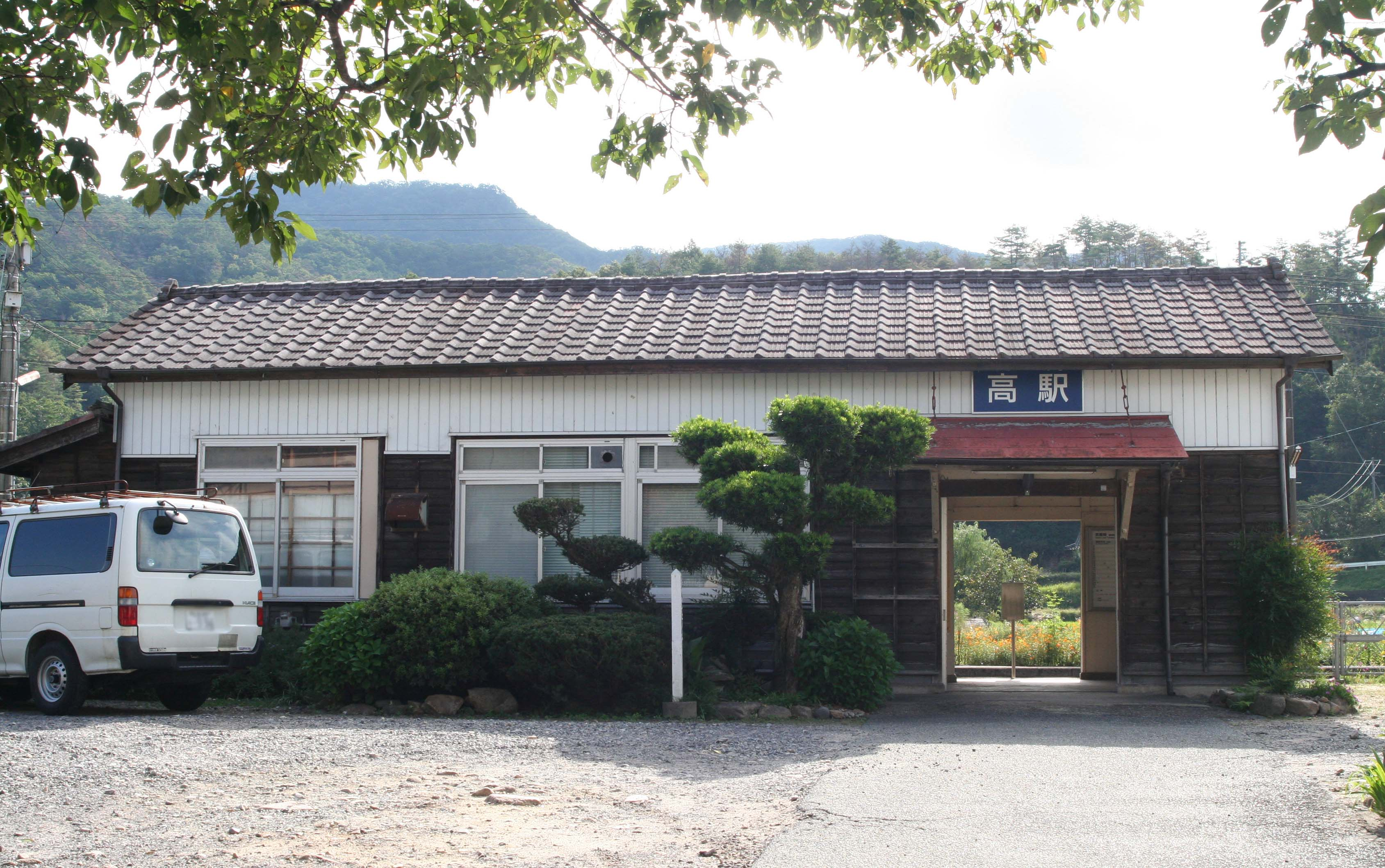
- Taka Station, October 2007

General information
- Location: 1262 Ishiba, Taka-chō, Shōbara-shi, Hiroshima-ken; Japan
- Coordinates: 34°52′40.24″N 133°4′14.02″E
- Operator: JR West
- Line: P Geibi Line
- Distance: 62.3 km (38.7 miles) from Bitchū-Kōjiro
- Platforms: 1 side platform
- Tracks: 1

Other information
- Status: Unstaffed
- Website: Official website

History
- Opened: 15 March 1934

Passengers
- 2019: 1 daily

Services
Preceding station	JR West	Following station
Bingo-Shōbara towards Hiroshima	Geibi Line Local	Hirako towards Niimi
Location
- Location within Hiroshima Prefecture Location within Japan

Taka Station (高駅, Taka-eki) is a passenger railway station located in Taka-chō, in the city of Shōbara, Hiroshima Prefecture, Japan. It is operated by the West Japan Railway Company (JR West).

== Lines ==
Taka Station is served by the Geibi Line, and is located 62.3 kilometers from the terminus of the line at Bitchū-Kōjiro and 68.7 kilometers from Niimi.

== Station layout ==
The station consists of one ground-level side platform serving single bi-directional track. It formerly had two side platforms; however, in 2010 use of one of the platforms was discontinued and the track removed, although the platform itself remains in situ. The station is unattended.

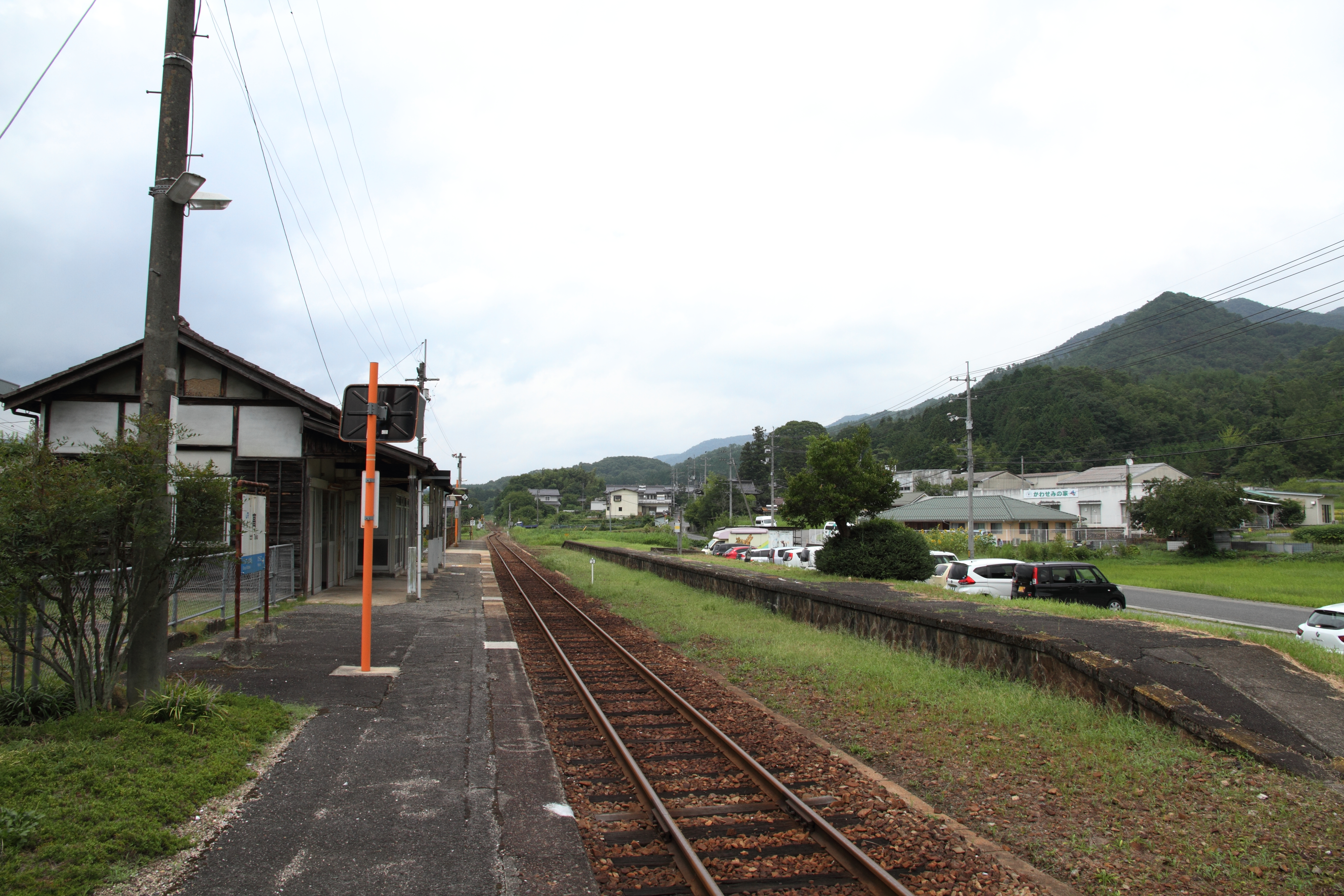

The station features a wooden station building that dates back to its original construction in 1934. While the second track and corresponding side platform were removed in 2010 to simplify maintenance, the remains of the former platform are still visible and have since been repurposed by local residents as a decorative flower bed. The station currently lacks permanent restroom facilities following the removal of its vault toilet.

== History ==
Taka Station was opened on March 15, 1934. It became part of JR West in 1987 when Japan National Railways was privatized.

Shortly after its opening as part of the Shōbara Line, the station was incorporated into the Sanshin Line on October 10, 1936, before officially becoming part of the Geibi Line on July 1, 1937.

Historically, the station handled both freight and baggage services; however, freight operations were discontinued on March 11, 1962, followed by the cessation of baggage services on September 1, 1972. The station was made unstaffed on October 31, 1983, transitioning to a simplified commission-based system (kan'i itaku) before the 1987 privatization of Japan National Railways.

== Passenger statistics ==
Taka Station has seen a long-term decline in ridership consistent with the depopulation of northern Hiroshima Prefecture.

In fiscal 2019, the station was used by an average of 1 passengers daily.

In fiscal 2020, the average daily number of boarding passengers was recorded as 0, reflecting the extreme rurality of the Tojo-Bingo-Ochiai section of the Geibi Line, which is documented as having the lowest transportation density in the entire JR West network.

== Surrounding area ==
- Shobara Municipal High Elementary School
  - Japan National Route 183

== See also ==
- List of railway stations in Japan
