= Bingo-Mikkaichi Station =

Railway station in Shōbara, Hiroshima Prefecture, Japan

Bingo-Mikkaichi Station 備後三日市駅
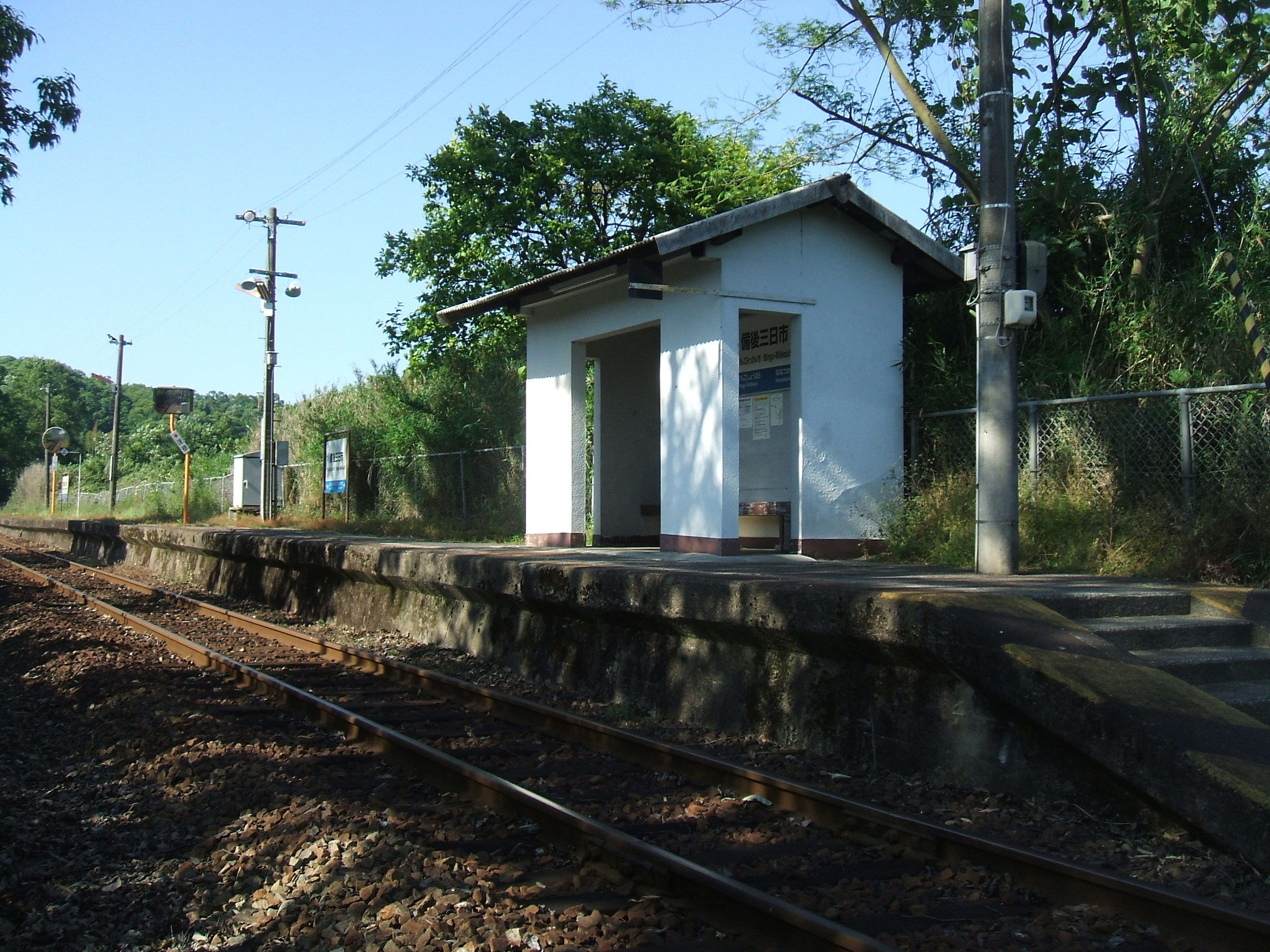
- Bingo-Mikkaichi Station in 2007

General information
- Location: Uehara-chō, Shōbara-shi, Hiroshima-ken 727-0022; Japan
- Coordinates: 34°51′16.42″N 132°59′53.9″E
- Operator: JR West
- Line: P Geibi Line
- Distance: 70.5 km (43.8 miles) from Bitchū-Kōjiro
- Platforms: 1 side platform
- Tracks: 1

Other information
- Status: Unstaffed
- Website: Official website

History
- Opened: 25 April 1930
- Former names: Mikkaichi (to 1933)

Passengers
- 2019: 1 daily

Services
Preceding station	JR West	Following station
Nanatsuka towards Hiroshima	Geibi Line Local	Bingo-Shōbara towards Niimi
Location
- Location within Hiroshima Prefecture Location within Japan

Bingo-Mikkaichi Station (備後三日市駅, Bingo-Mikkaichi-eki) is a passenger railway station located in Uehara-chō, in the city of Shōbara, Hiroshima Prefecture, Japan. It is operated by the West Japan Railway Company (JR West).

== Lines ==
Bingo-Mikkaichi Station is served by the Geibi Line, and is located 70.5 kilometers from the terminus of the line at Bitchū-Kōjiro and 76.9 kilometers from Niimi.

== Station layout ==
The station consists of one ground-level side platform serving a single bi-directional track. There is no station building, but only a small waiting room, and the station is unattended. Although a ground-level station, it is located on a hill above the neighboring hamlet.

== History ==
Bingo-Mikkaichi Station was opened on April 25, 1930 as the Mikkkaichi Stop (三日市停留場, Mikkaichi Teiryūba)on the Geibi Railway. It was renamed and elevated to a full station on June 1, 1933 when the line was nationalized. It became part of JR West on April 1, 1987 when Japan National Railways was privatized.

== Passenger statistics ==
In fiscal 2019, the station was used by an average of 1 passengers daily.

== Surrounding area ==
- Shobara Municipal Higashi Elementary School
- Hiroshima Prefectural Shobara Kakuchi High School

== See also ==
- List of railway stations in Japan
