= Ashida River =

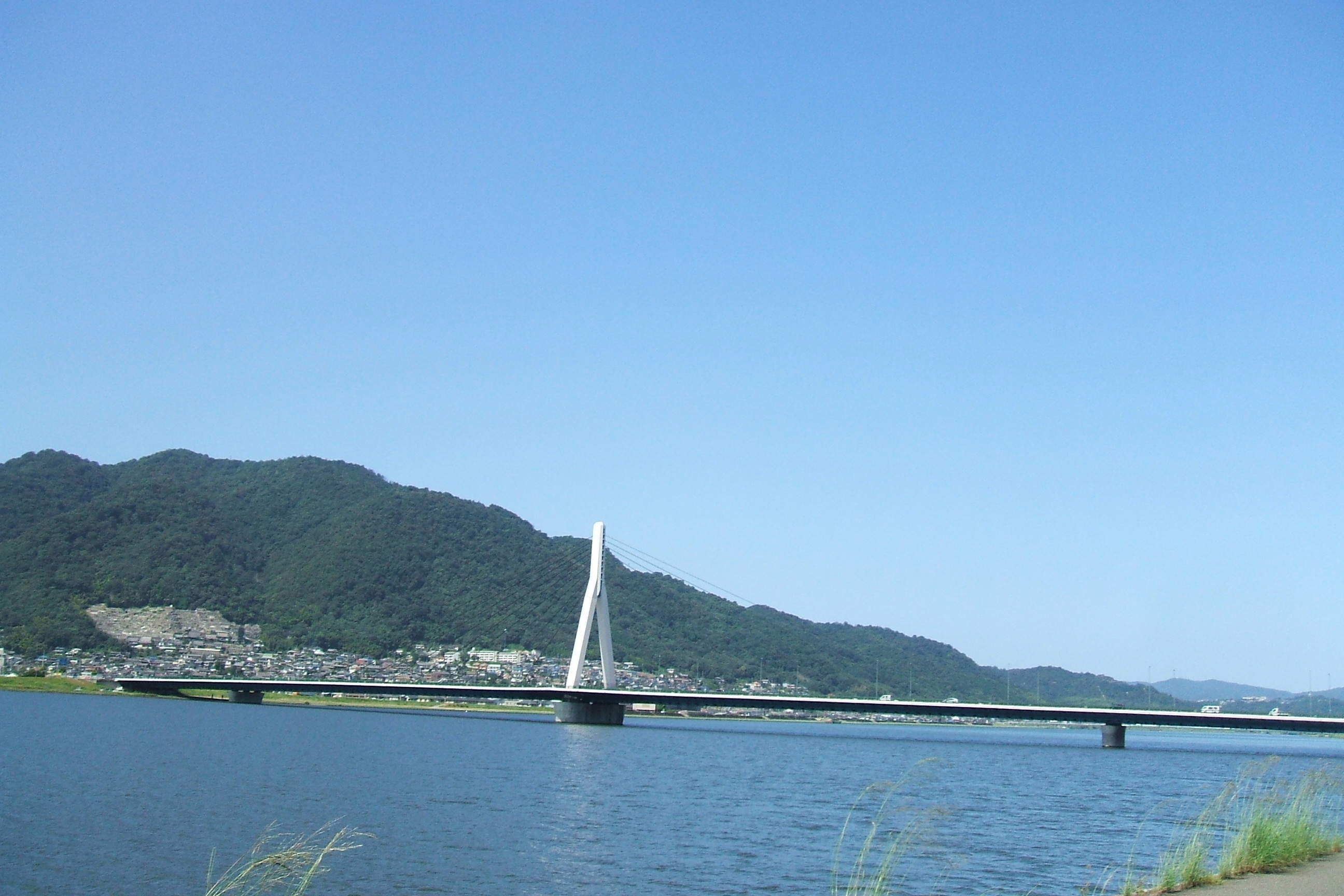

- Location within Japan
- Native name: 芦田川 (Japanese)

Location
- Country: Japan

Physical characteristics
- Source
  - location: Daiwa-chō, Mihara on the Sera Plateau in Hiroshima Prefecture
  - elevation: 570 m (1,870 ft)
- Mouth
  - location: Seto Inland Sea
  - coordinates: 34.4378°N 133.4058°E
  - elevation: 0 m (0 ft)
- Length: 86 km (53 mi)
- Basin size: 870 km^{2} (340 mi^{2})

The Ashida River (芦田川, Ashida-gawa) is a river that flows through the eastern part of Hiroshima Prefecture, Japan. The river provides the primary drainage for the Bingo region.

The source of the river is in the city of Mihara, Hiroshima and flows generally east toward Niimi, Okayama. After flowing through the Hattabara and Mikawa Dams in Fuchū, Hiroshima, the river passes through Fukuyama, Hiroshima, where it empties into the Seto Inland Sea.

== Geography and development ==
The Ashida River originates in Daiwa-chō, Mihara on the Sera Plateau in Hiroshima Prefecture in Japan. It travels for 86 kilometres (53 mi) mostly eastward through eastern Hiroshima Prefecture, and has a drainage basin of 870 square kilometres (340 mi^{2}). This river is the primary drainage for the Bingo region.

Flood retaining walls were constructed along the banks of the Ashida River in 1928. It was designated as a Class A river in 1967.

In a report from 2015, the river was ranked the worst for water quality among the thirteen Class A rivers in the Chugoku region. Since 2012, the water quality in the Ashida River has improved significantly, with tributaries showing improvements between 17 and 43 percent.

== Flora and fauna ==
In the 2020s, Okayama University conducted a study of the river to survey the population of Rhodeus suigensis in the river basin. The Japanese Ministry of the Environment had designated the species as extremely endangered. Environmental DNA analysis was utilized by the university to determine the concentration of the bitterling fish in various portions of the river.
