= Hiroshima Prefectural Museum of History =

- 広島県立歴史博物館
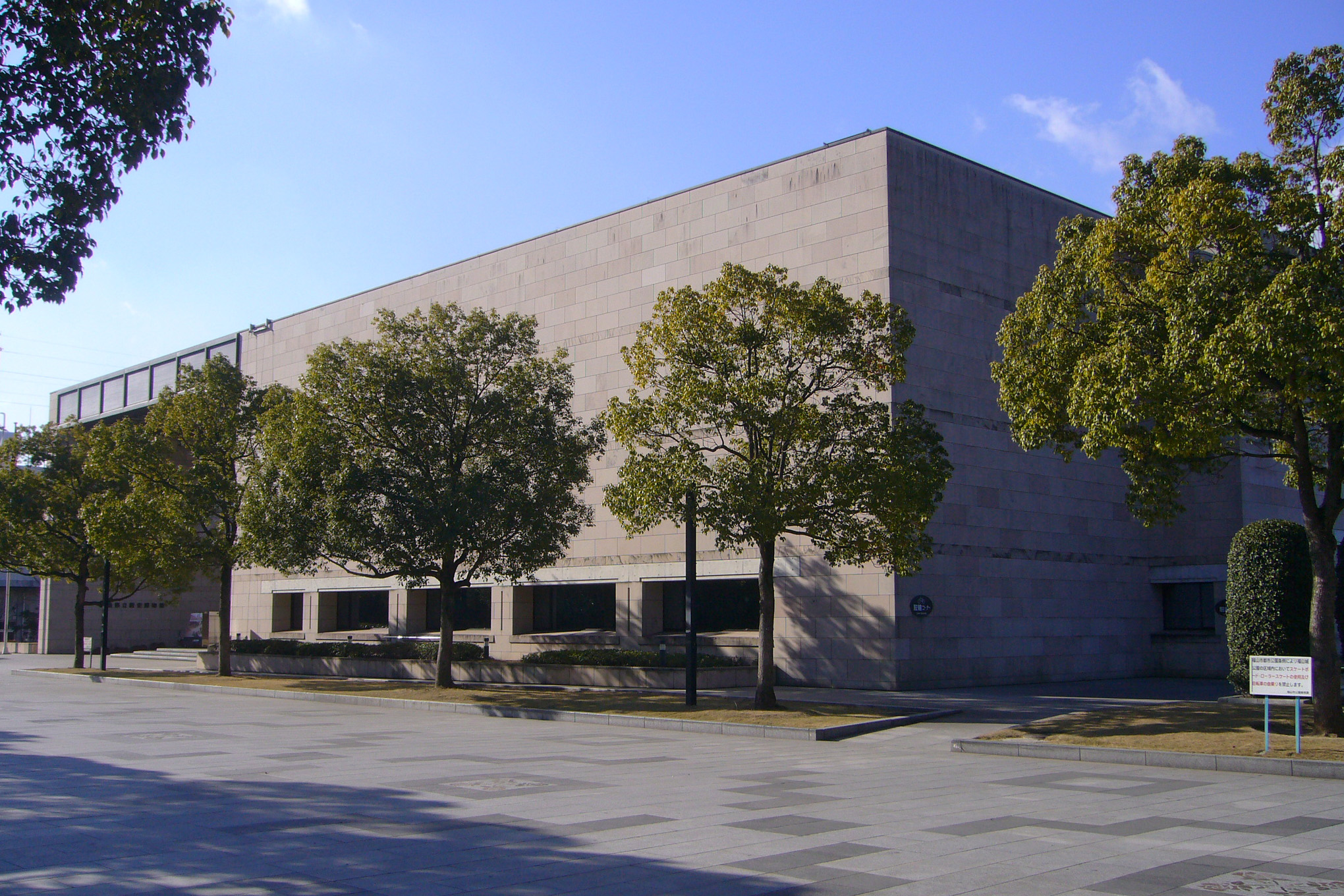
- Interactive map of the Hiroshima Prefectural Museum of History area

General information
- Location: 2-4-1 Nishi-machi,, Fukuyama, Hiroshima Prefecture, Japan
- Coordinates: 34°29′23″N 133°21′32″E
- Opened: 3 November 1989

Website
- homepage

Hiroshima Prefectural Museum of History (広島県立歴史博物館, Hiroshima Kenritsu Rekishi Hakubutsukan) is a prefectural museum in Fukuyama, Japan, dedicated to the history and culture of the Setouchi region. It has a particular focus upon the medieval settlement of Kusado Sengen. The museum opened in the grounds of Fukuyama Castle in 1989.

== See also ==
- List of Historic Sites of Japan (Hiroshima)
- Aki Province
- Bingo Province
