= Nanatsuka Station =

Railway station in Shōbara, Hiroshima Prefecture, Japan

Nanatsuka Station 七塚駅
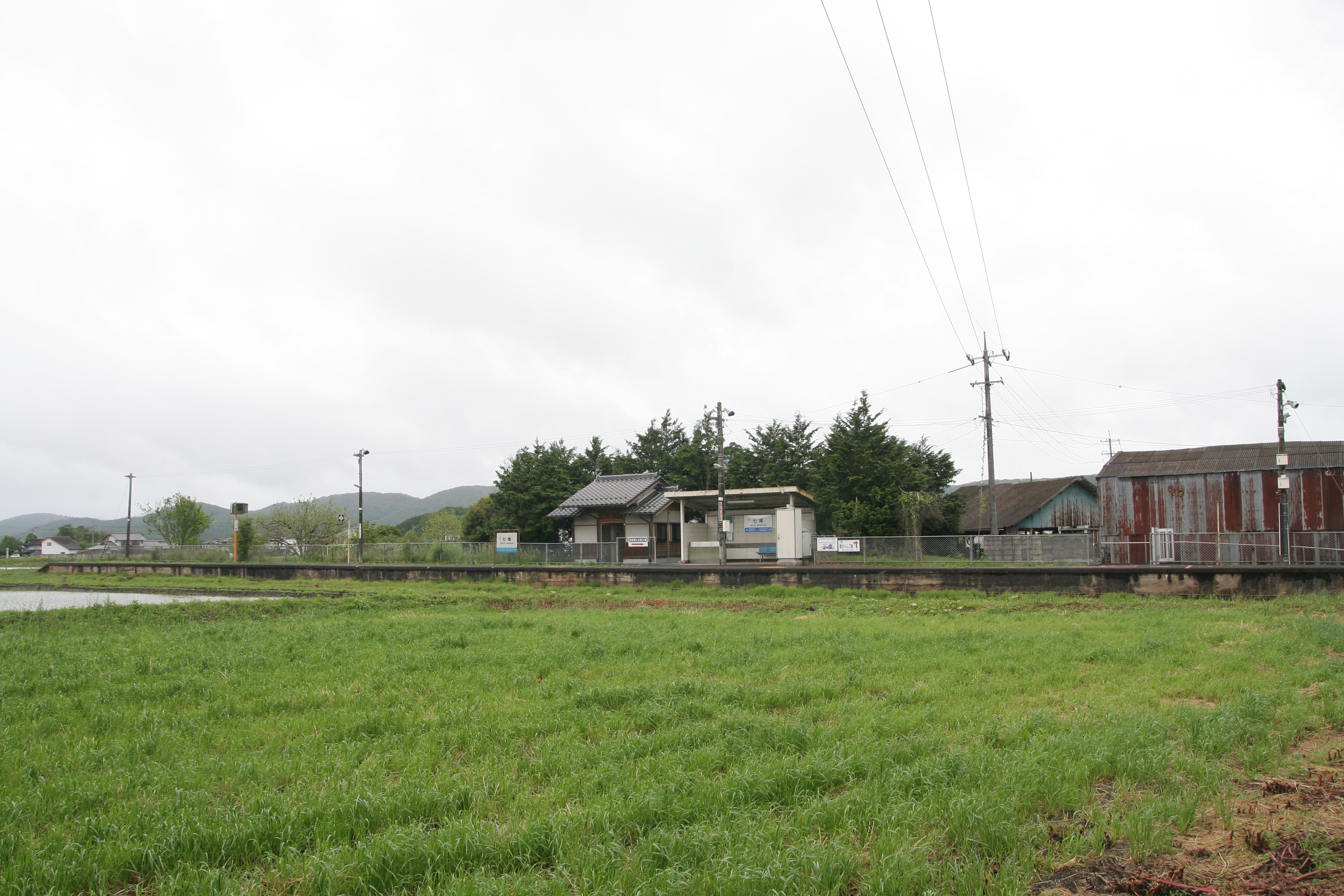
- Nanatsuka Station in May 2010

General information
- Location: Nanatsuka-chō, Shōbara-shi, Hiroshima-ken 727-0023; Japan
- Coordinates: 34°50′40.58″N 132°59′9.28″E
- Operator: JR West
- Line: P Geibi Line
- Distance: 72.2 km (44.9 miles) from Bitchū-Kōjiro
- Platforms: 1 side platform
- Tracks: 1

Other information
- Status: Unstaffed
- Website: Official website

History
- Opened: 8 December 1923

Passengers
- 2019: 4 daily

Services
Preceding station	JR West	Following station
Yamanouchi towards Hiroshima	Geibi Line	Bingo-Mikkaichi towards Niimi
Location
- Location within Hiroshima Prefecture Location within Japan

Nanatsuka Station (七塚駅, Nanatsuka-eki) is a passenger railway station located in Nanatsuka-chō, in the city of Shōbara, Hiroshima Prefecture, Japan. It is operated by the West Japan Railway Company (JR West).

== Lines ==
Nanatsuka Station is served by the Geibi Line, and is located 72.2 kilometers from the terminus of the line at Bitchū-Kōjiro and 78.6 kilometers from Niimi.

== Station layout ==
The station consists of one ground-level opposed side platform serving a single bi-directional track. There is no station building, but only waiting rom with a toilet on the platform. The station is unattended.

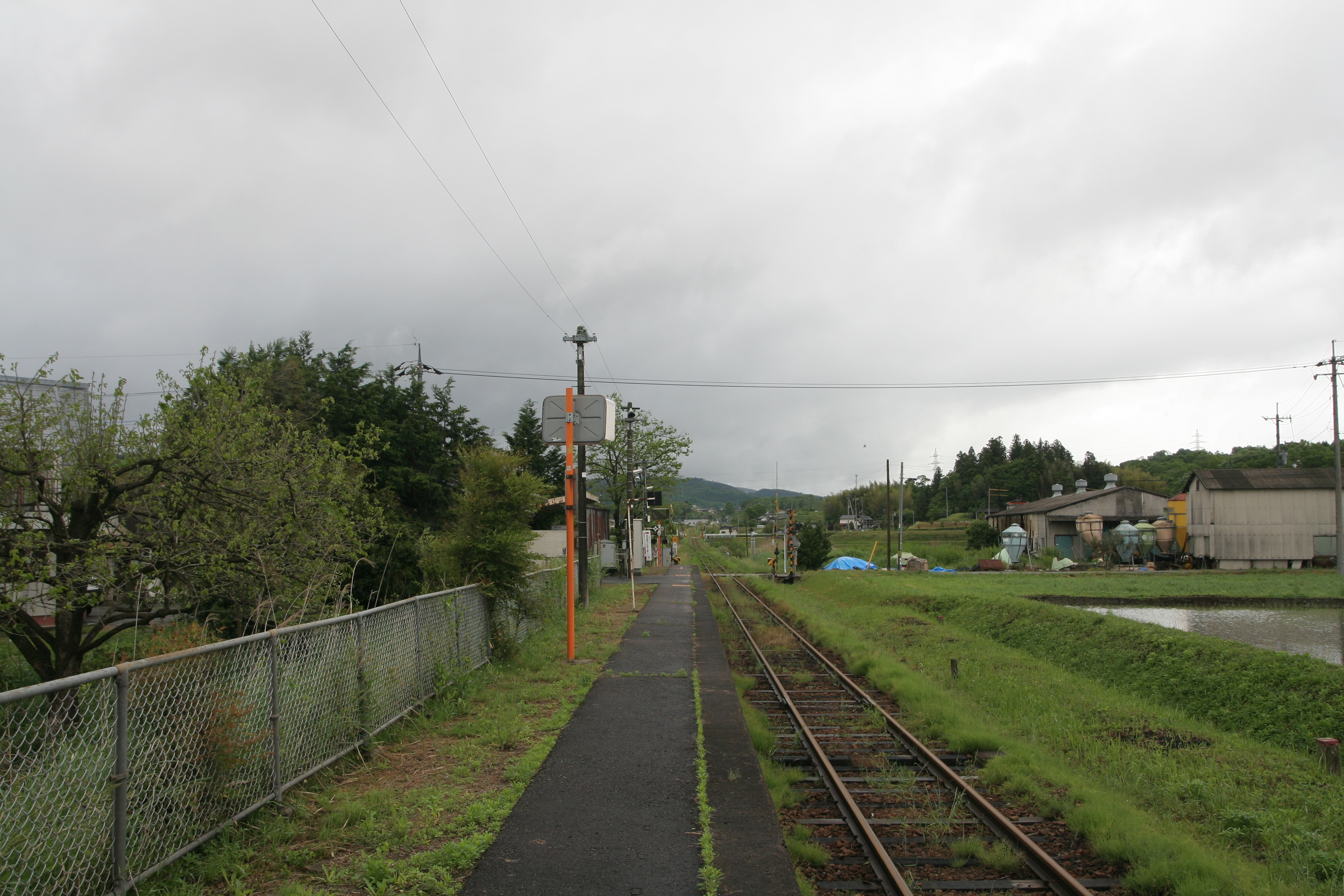
Platforms

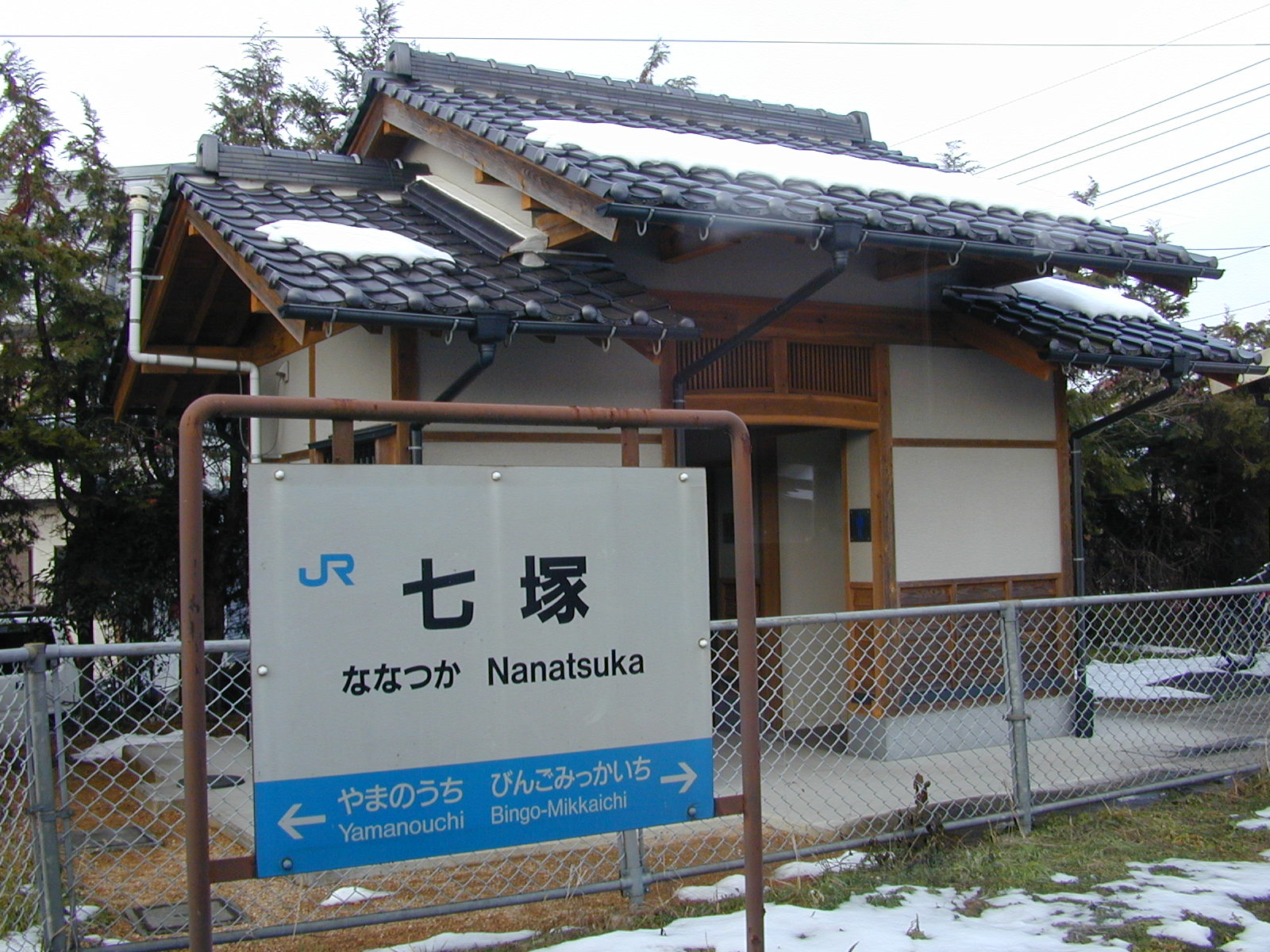
Waiting room

== History ==
Nanatsuka Station was opened on December 8, 1923 on the Geibi Railway. It became part of JR West on April 1, 1987 when Japan National Railways was privatized.

== Passenger statistics ==
In fiscal 2019, the station was used by an average of 4 passengers daily.

== Surrounding area ==
- Japan National Route 183
- National Bihoku Hillside Park

== See also ==
- List of railway stations in Japan
