= Hattabara Dam =

Dam in Hiroshima, Japan

Coordinates: 34°35′19″N 133°08′44″E

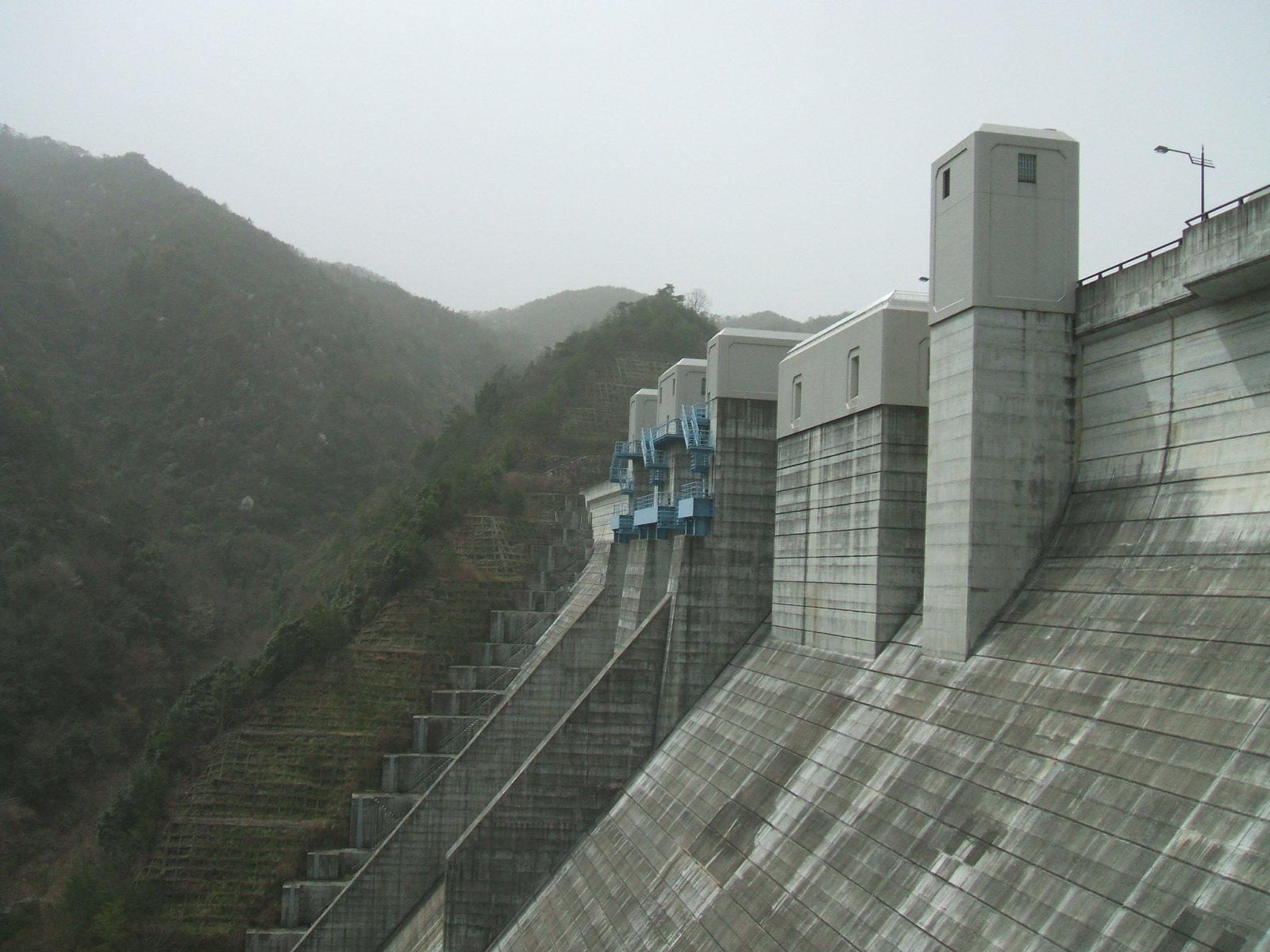
- Location: Sera, Hiroshima, Japan.
- Construction began: 1973
- Opening date: 1997

Dam and spillways
- Impounds: Ashida River
- Height: 84.9 m
- Length: 325 m

Reservoir
- Total capacity: 60,000,000 m^{3}
- Catchment area: 241.6 km^{2}
- Surface area: 261 hectares

Hattabara Dam (八田原ダム, Hattabara damu) is a dam in Sera, Hiroshima Prefecture, Japan.

== Description ==
The dam was built for the functional expansion of control facilities to quickly ascertain weather information and related matters, and confirm the safety of the river in discharge. Furthermore, management was made more efficient to more accurately carry out dam control. It was necessary for dam control to continue its adequate control always paying attention to meteorological information, river flow rate, dam storage capacity, and related matters, at all times.
