= Mikawa Dam =

Dam in Hiroshima Prefecture, Japan

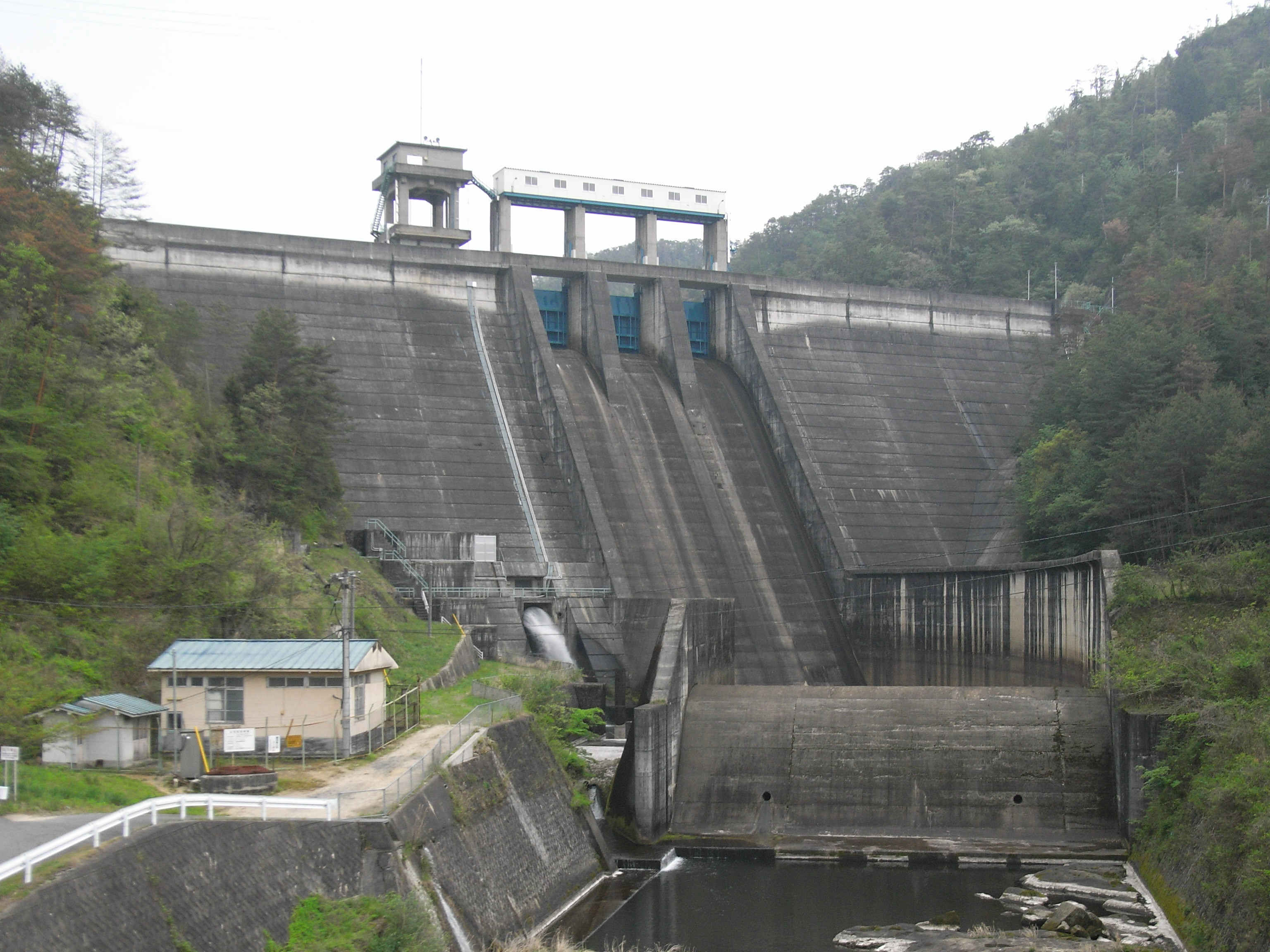
- Interactive map of Mikawa Dam
- Location: Hiroshima Prefecture, Japan.
- Coordinates: 34°36′57″N 133°06′16″E
- Construction began: 1949
- Opening date: 1960

Dam and spillways
- Impounds: Ashida River
- Height: 53 m
- Length: 154.2 m

Reservoir
- Total capacity: 12,698,000 m^{3}
- Catchment area: 108.0 km^{2}
- Surface area: 77 hectares

Mikawa Dam is a dam in the Hiroshima Prefecture of Japan.
