= Takano, Hiroshima =

Dissolved municipality in Hiroshima prefecture, Japan

Takano (高野町, Takano-chō) was a town located in Hiba District, Hiroshima Prefecture, Japan.

As of November 2021, the town had a population of 1,593 and a density of 10.00 persons per km^{2}. The total area was 159.18 km^{2}.

On March 31, 2005, Takano, along with the towns of Hiwa, Kuchiwa, Saijō and Tōjō (all from Hiba District), and the town of Sōryō (from Kōnu District), was merged into the expanded city of Shōbara.
