= Jinseki, Hiroshima =

Dissolved municipality in Hiroshima prefecture, Japan

Jinseki (神石町, Jinseki-chō) was a town located in Jinseki District, Hiroshima Prefecture, Japan.

As of 2003, the town had an estimated population of 2,746 and a density of 26.41 persons per km^{2}. The total area was 103.98 km^{2}.

On November 5, 2004, Jinseki, along with the towns of Sanwa and Yuki, and the village of Toyomatsu (all from Jinseki District), was merged to create the town of Jinsekikōgen.
