= Kannabe, Hiroshima =

Dissolved municipality in Hiroshima prefecture, Japan

Kannabe (神辺町, Kannabe-chō) was a town located in Fukayasu District, Hiroshima Prefecture, Japan.

As of 2003, the town had an estimated population of 40,498 and a density of 712.87 persons per km^{2}. The total area was 56.81 km^{2}.

On March 1, 2006, Kannabe was merged into the expanded city of Fukuyama.
