= Numakuma, Hiroshima =

Dissolved municipality in Hiroshima prefecture, Japan

Numakuma (沼隈町, Numakuma-chō) was a town located in Numakuma District, Hiroshima Prefecture, Japan.

== Population ==
As of 2003, the town had an estimated population of 12,511 and a density of 404.49 persons per km^{2}. The total area was 30.93 km^{2}.

== Merge ==
On February 1, 2005, Numakuma was merged into the expanded city of Fukuyama.
