= Saijō, Hiroshima (Shōbara) =

Saijō 西城町
- Municipal division
- Flag Seal

- Location in Japan
- Coordinates: 34°56′23.6322″N 133°7′4.0758″E
- Country: Japan
- Region: Chūgoku (San'yō)
- Prefecture: Hiroshima Prefecture
- District: Hiba

Area
  - Total: 226.91 km^{2} (87.61 sq mi)

Population (November 2021)
  - Total: 3,146
  - Density: 13.86/km^{2} (35.91/sq mi)
- Time zone: UTC+09:00 (JST)
- City hall address: 737-3 Ōsa, Saijō-chō, Shōbara-shi, Hiroshima-ken; 729-5792
- Website: www.city.shobara.hiroshima.jp
- Symbols
- Bird: Lesser cuckoo
- Flower: Taniutsugi
- Tree: Japanese yew

Saijō (西城町, Saijō-chō) was a town located in Hiba District, Hiroshima Prefecture, Japan. The site of a feudal castle from the Sengoku period, it was first incorporated as a town in 1898. It then went through several mergers with other towns and villages in the area before being incorporated itself into the city of Shōbara in March 2005. It is now a municipal division within Shōbara.

There are three elementary schools, a junior high school, and a high school located in Saijō. The area is served by the JR West Geibi and Kisuki railway lines. Saijō is located on Japan National Route 183 and 314, and is crossed by three major Hiroshima Prefectural Highways and ten smaller prefectural highways.

== Etymology ==
The name of Saijō (西城町, Saijō-chō), which literally means "West Castle Town", is derived from the castle which was built in the area by a feudal lord during the Sengoku period. A comparable castle was built in the nearby Tōjō (which means "East Castle Town"). Neither castle is still standing, though you can view parts of the ruins (mostly foundation and other walls).

== History ==
During the 5th century A.D., a kofun grave chamber was constructed in the area. On February 10, 1898, the village of Saijō was incorporated into the town of Saijō. On October 1 of the same year, the districts of Ezo, Nuka, and Mikami, along with the town of Saijō and the villages of Mikoto and Yahoko, were combined to create Hiba District.

A new town of Saijō was created on February 11, 1942, when the original town of Saijō and the village of Mikoto merged. Due to geographic considerations, the Miino Yukiasa section of Yahoko Village was split off on December 1, 1953, and merged with Hachikawa Village in the Nita District of Shimane Prefecture.

The town of Saijō reincorporated on March 31, 1954, when it merged with the village of Yahoko. Fifty-one years later, the towns of Saijō, Hiwa, Kuchiwa, Takano, and Tōjō from Hiba District, Hiroshima, and the town of Sōryō (from Kōnu District) all merged with the city of Shōbara. After 106 years of independent history, the town of Saijō ceased to exist, and it became a municipal division within Shōbara.

== Demographics ==
As of November 2021, the town had a population of 3,146 and a density of 13.86 persons per km^{2}. The total area was 226.91 km^{2}.

== Education ==
There are currently four public schools in operation in Saijō.

Saijō Elementary School (庄原市立西城小学校, Shōbara Shiritsu Saijō Shogakkō) is located near the south end of the main part of town, just across the river from Route 183. Mikoto Elementary School (庄原市立美古登小学校, Shōbara Shiritsu Mikoto Shogakkō) is located just off Route 183, southwest of Hibayama Station.

Saijō Junior High School (庄原市立西城中学校, Shōbara Shiritsu Saijō Chūgakkō) stands atop a hill overlooking the main business district and the Shōbara Municipal Saijō Shimin Hospital. The high school, Saijō Shisui High School (広島県立西城紫水高等学校, Hiroshima Kenritsu Saijō Shisui Kōtō Gakkō) is located on top of a hill to the southwest of the junior high school, and directly above and to the northwest of Saijō Elementary School. It was previously named Hiroshima Prefectural Saijō Trades High School (広島県立西城商業高等学校, Hiroshima Kenritsu Saijō Shōgyō Kōtō Gakkō).

== Transportation ==
=== Highways ===
Japan National Route 314 travels south from Shimane Prefecture, then turns east toward Okayama Prefecture after briefly joining Japan National Route 183 for about 1 km at Bingo-Ochiai Station. The Hibayama Onsen is located on Route 314 about halfway between Bingo-Ochiai Station and Yuki Station. Route 314 originates in Fukuyama, Hiroshima and terminates in Unnan, Shimane.

Japan National Route 183 originates in Naka-ku, Hiroshima and terminates in Yonago, Tottori. It travels through Saijō northeast from near Hirako Station, generally following the Geibi Line until the Geibi Line turns southeast at the Yahoko Post Office. Route 183 instead continues northeast past the turnoff for Dōgoyama Takahara Ski Resort before entering Tottori Prefecture.

The following prefectural highways serve Saijō:

- Hiroshima Prefectural Highway 26 Shin'ichi Nanamagari Saijō Route (広島県道26号新市七曲西城線, Hiroshima Kendō 26-gō Shin'ichi Nanamagari Saijō Sen)
- Hiroshima Prefectural Highway 57 Tōjō-Saijō Route (広島県道57号東城西城線, Hiroshima Kendō 57-gō Tōjō-Saijō Sen)
- Hiroshima Prefectural Highway 58 Saijō-Hiwa Route (広島県道58号西城比和線, Hiroshima Kendō 58-gō Saijō-Hiwa Sen)
- Hiroshima Prefectural Highway 233 Bingo-Saijō Taxi Stop Route (広島県道233号備後西城停車場線, Hiroshima Kendō 233-gō Bingo-Saijō Teishajō Sen)
- Hiroshima Prefectural Highway 234 Bingo-Ochiai Taxi Stop Route (広島県道234号備後落合停車場線, Hiroshima Kendō 234-gō Bingo-Ochiai Teishajō Sen)
- Hiroshima Prefectural Highway 235 Dōgoyama Taxi Stop Route (広島県道235号道後山停車場線, Hiroshima Kendō 235-gō Dōgoyama Teishajō Sen)
- Hiroshima Prefectural Highway 250 Dōgoyama Park Route (広島県道250号道後山公園線, Hiroshima Kendō 250-gō Dōgoyama Kōen Sen)
- Hiroshima Prefectural Highway 254 Hibayama Park Route (広島県道254号比婆山公園線, Hiroshima Kendō 254-gō Hibayama Kōen Sen)
- Hiroshima Prefectural Highway 255 Hibayama Park Moriwaki Route (広島県道255号比婆山公園森脇線, Hiroshima Kendō 255-gō Hibayama Kōen Moriwaki Sen)
- Hiroshima Prefectural Highway 256 Hibayama Kenmin no Mori Route (広島県道256号比婆山県民の森線, Hiroshima Kendō 256-gō Hibayama Kenmin no Mori Sen)
- Hiroshima Prefectural Highway 444 Yuki-Onuka Route (広島県道444号油木小奴可線, Hiroshima Kendō 444-gō Yuki-Onuka Sen)
- Hiroshima Prefectural Highway 445 Nakazako-Kawakita Route (広島県道445号中迫川北線, Hiroshima Kendō 445-gō Nakazako-Kawakita Sen)
- Hiroshima Prefectural Highway 446 Ueki-Misaka Route (広島県道446号植木三坂線, Hiroshima Kendō 446-gō Ueki-Misaka Sen)

=== Railways ===
JR West operates multiple stations along two rail lines in Saijō. Along the Geibi, service in Saijō begins with Hirako Station about 4.2 kilometres (2.6 mi) southwest of Bingo-Saijō Station, located in the heart of Saijō. Hibayama Station is next as you go north, located about 800 metres (2,600 ft) north of Mikoto Elementary School.

Bingo-Ochiai Station, located 5.6 kilometres (3.5 mi) north of Hibayama, connects with the Kisuki Line and is just a few hundred meters south of the Akagi Internal Medicine Clinic. The next station is Dōgoyama Station, located 6.8 kilometres (4.2 mi) by rail (though only about 3 kilometres (1.9 mi) via Japan National Route 314). Dōgoyama Station gives quick access to Takaohara Ski Resort, Snow Resort Nekoyama, and Dōgoyama Takahara Ski Resort (all within 7 kilometres (4.3 mi)), as well as Kurokan Park and the Suzuran no Yu onsen (both within 6 kilometres (3.7 mi)).

The Kisuki Line travels 6.6 kilometres (4.1 mi) from Bingo-Ochiai Station to Yuki Station before going to Miinohara Station in Shimane Prefecture.
