= Toyomatsu, Hiroshima =

Dissolved municipality in Japan

Toyomatsu (豊松村, Toyomatsu-son) was a village located in Jinseki District, Hiroshima Prefecture, Japan. The village maintained their village status since the end of 19th century.

On November 5, 2004, Toyomatsu, along with the towns of Jinseki, Sanwa and Yuki (all from Jinseki District), was merged to create the town of Jinsekikōgen. It was the last municipality in Hiroshima Prefecture to act as a village and due to the disbanding this village, all villages have been dissolved within Hiroshima Prefecture (only the third case following Hyōgo and Kagawa Prefectures).

== Timeline ==
- April 1, 1889 - The village was established. The village area includes 有木, 上豊松, 笹尾, 下豊松, 中平.
- July 1, 1897 - The villages of Arugi, Kamitoyomatsu, Sasao, Shimotoyomatsu, and Nakadaira were merged to create the village of Toyomatsu.
- In the mid-1950s - Toyomatsu and Yuki town had a merger discussion. but that did not come true.
- November 5, 2004 - Toyomatsu, along with the towns of Jinseki, Sanwa and Yuki (all from Jinseki District), was merged to create the town of Jinsekikōgen and the village dissolved.

== Geography ==
- River
  - Senwa River flows in north of the village. One of the Takahashi River's branch.
- Mountains
  - Yonamiyama (米見山, Elevation 663m)

== Famous and historic place ==
- 仙養ヶ原 (Senyōgahara)
- Lucky Buddha (幸運仏)
- Toyomatsu Paper Plane Tower (とよまつ紙ヒコーキ・タワー)

== Industry ==
- Agriculture is main industry. special products are konnyaku potato and tomato.

== Localities ==
- Arugi (有木)
- Kamitoyomatsu (上豊松)
- Sasao (笹尾)
- Shimotoyomatsu (下豊松)
- Nakadaira (中平)

== Education (as per November 4, 2004 data) ==
- Elementary schools
  - Toyomatsu Village Elementary School
- Middle Schools
  - Toyomatsu Village Middle School
