= Tōjō, Hiroshima =

Dissolved municipality in Hiroshima prefecture, Japan

Tōjō (東城町, Tōjō-chō) was a town located in Hiba District, Hiroshima Prefecture, Japan.

As of November 2021, the town had a population of 7,145 and a population density of 23.43 persons per square kilometer. The total area was 304.92 km^{2}.

On March 31, 2005, Tōjō, along with the towns of Hiwa, Kuchiwa, Saijō and Takano (all from Hiba District), and the town of Sōryō (from Kōnu District), was merged into the expanded city of Shōbara.
