= Sōryō, Hiroshima =

Dissolved municipality in Hiroshima prefecture, Japan

Sōryō (総領町, Sōryō-chō) was a town located in Kōnu District, Hiroshima Prefecture, Japan.

As of November 2021, the town had a population of 1,212 and a density of 17.16 persons per km^{2}. The total area was 70.61 km^{2}.

On March 31, 2005, Sōryō, along with the towns of Hiwa, Kuchiwa, Saijō, Takano and Tōjō (all from Hiba District), was merged into the expanded city of Shōbara.
