= Jōge, Hiroshima =

Town in Kōnu, Hiroshima, Japan

Jōge (上下町, Jōge-chō) was a town located in Kōnu District, Hiroshima Prefecture, Japan.

== Population ==
As of 2004, the town had an estimated population of 5,966 and a density of 69.75 persons per km^{2}. The total area was 85.53 km^{2}.

== Merge ==
On April 1, 2004, Jōge was merged into the expanded city of Fuchū and no longer exists as an independent municipality.

== Places of interest ==
- Okina-za
- Yano Hot Spring
- White Wall Street
