= Kuchiwa, Hiroshima =

Dissolved municipality in Hiroshima prefecture, Japan

Kuchiwa (口和町, Kuchiwa-chō) was a town located in Hiba District, Hiroshima Prefecture, Japan.

As of November 2021, the town had a population of 1,864 and a density of 16.93 persons per km^{2}. The total area was 110.13 km^{2}.

On March 31, 2005, Kuchiwa, along with the towns of Hiwa, Saijō, Takano and Tōjō (all from Hiba District), and the town of Sōryō (from Kōnu District), was merged into the expanded city of Shōbara.
