= Hiwa, Hiroshima =

Dissolved municipality in Hiroshima prefecture, Japan

Hiwa (比和町, Hiwa-chō) was a town located in Hiba District, Hiroshima Prefecture, Japan.

As of November 2021, the town had a population of 1,229 and a density of 9.36 persons per km^{2}. The total area was 131.30 km^{2}.

On March 31, 2005, Hiwa, along with the towns of Kuchiwa, Saijō, Takano and Tōjō (all from Hiba District), and the town of Sōryō (from Kōnu District), was merged into the expanded city of Shōbara.
