= Jinsekikōgen, Hiroshima =

Jinsekikōgen 神石高原町
- Town
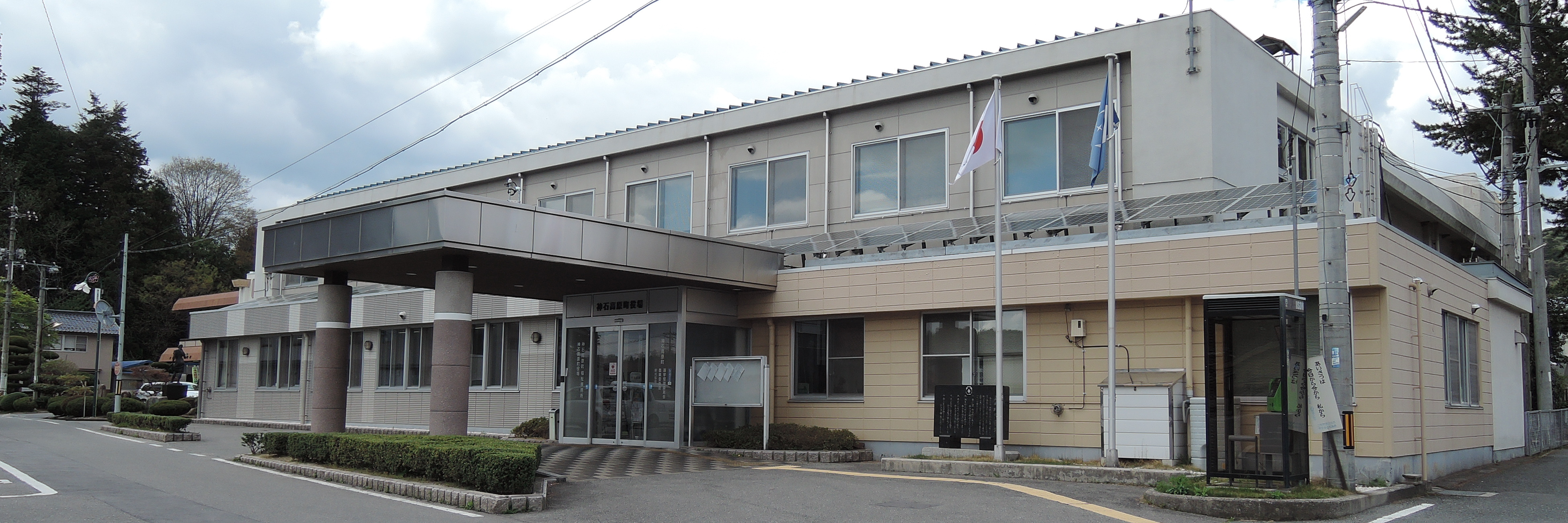
- Jinsekikōgen town hall

- Flag Emblem
- Interactive map of Jinsekikōgen
- Location in Japan
- Coordinates: 34°42′13″N 133°14′52″E
- Country: Japan
- Region: Chūgoku; San'yō
- Prefecture: Hiroshima
- District: Jinseki

Area
  - Total: 381.98 km^{2} (147.48 sq mi)

Population (April 1, 2023)
  - Total: 8,166
  - Density: 21.38/km^{2} (55.37/sq mi)
- Time zone: UTC+09:00 (JST)
- City hall address: 2025 Kobatake, Jinsekikōgen-chō, Jinseki-gun, Hiroshima-ken 720-1522
- Climate: Cfa
- Website: Official website
- Symbols
- Flower: Echinops setifer
- Tree: Japanese Dogwood

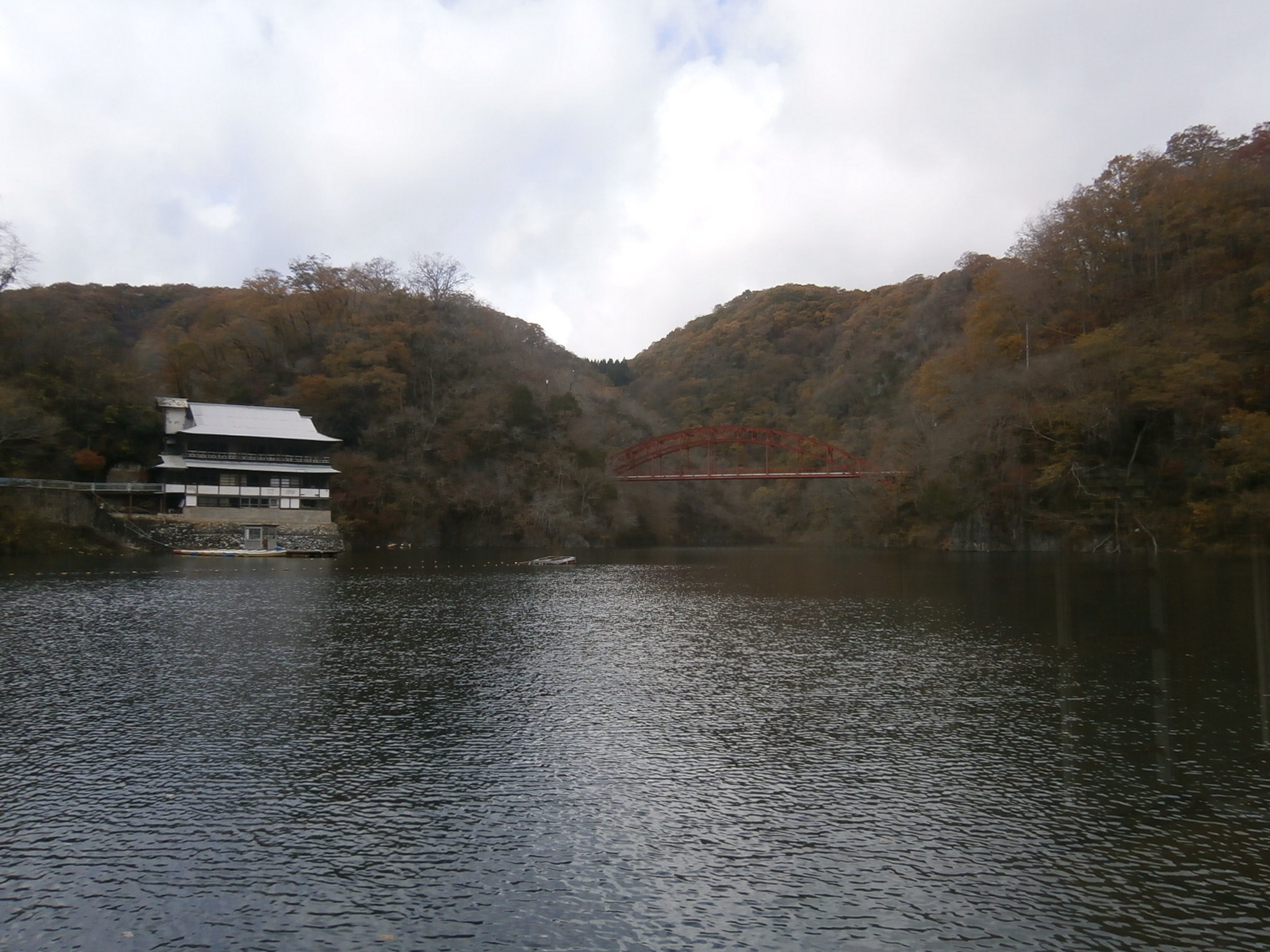
Sakurabashi Bridge at Lake Taishaku

Jinsekikōgen (神石高原町, Jinsekikōgen-chō) is a town located in Jinseki District, Hiroshima Prefecture, Japan. As of 1 April 2023, the town had an estimated population of 8,166 in 3781 households, and a population density of 21 persons per km^{2} in 7,269 households. The total area of the town is 381.98 km^{2} (147.48 sq mi).

== Geography ==
Jinsekikōgen is located in eastern Hiroshima. The town area is generally located on a plateau with an elevation of 400 to 700 meters, and consists of basalt and red soil layers. Part of the area forms a limestone karst plateau, and the rivers that flow through this area carve out valleys. The surrounding highlands came to be known as the Jinseki Plateau.

=== Neighboring municipalities ===
Hiroshima Prefecture

- Fuchū
- Fukuyama
- Shōbara

Okayama Prefecture

- Ibara
- Takahashi

=== Climate ===
Jinsekikōgen has a humid subtropical climate (Köppen climate classification Cfa) characterized by cool to mild winters and hot, humid summers. The average annual temperature in Jinsekikōgen is 11.3 °C (52.3 °F). The average annual rainfall is 1,365.9 mm (53.78 in) with July as the wettest month. The temperatures are highest on average in August, at around 23.4 °C (74.1 °F), and lowest in January, at around 0.0 °C (32.0 °F). The highest temperature ever recorded in Jinsekikōgen was 34.9 °C (94.8 °F) on 15 August 2024; the coldest temperature ever recorded was −16.3 °C (2.7 °F) on 28 February 1981.

Climate data for Yuki, Jinsekikōgen (1991−2020 normals, extremes 1978−present)
Month	Jan	Feb	Mar	Apr	May	Jun	Jul	Aug	Sep	Oct	Nov	Dec	Year
Record high °C (°F)	14.7 (58.5)	18.7 (65.7)	22.3 (72.1)	28.3 (82.9)	30.5 (86.9)	32.1 (89.8)	34.6 (94.3)	34.9 (94.8)	33.9 (93.0)	28.2 (82.8)	24.3 (75.7)	18.6 (65.5)	34.9 (94.8)
Mean daily maximum °C (°F)	4.7 (40.5)	6.0 (42.8)	10.5 (50.9)	16.5 (61.7)	21.4 (70.5)	24.1 (75.4)	27.6 (81.7)	28.8 (83.8)	24.7 (76.5)	19.1 (66.4)	13.3 (55.9)	7.3 (45.1)	17.0 (62.6)
Daily mean °C (°F)	0.0 (32.0)	0.7 (33.3)	4.2 (39.6)	9.8 (49.6)	14.8 (58.6)	18.8 (65.8)	22.8 (73.0)	23.4 (74.1)	19.2 (66.6)	12.9 (55.2)	7.0 (44.6)	2.0 (35.6)	11.3 (52.3)
Mean daily minimum °C (°F)	−4.2 (24.4)	−4.1 (24.6)	−1.7 (28.9)	2.7 (36.9)	8.1 (46.6)	13.8 (56.8)	18.7 (65.7)	19.2 (66.6)	14.7 (58.5)	7.5 (45.5)	1.6 (34.9)	−2.4 (27.7)	6.2 (43.1)
Record low °C (°F)	−13.4 (7.9)	−16.3 (2.7)	−10.9 (12.4)	−6.6 (20.1)	−3.0 (26.6)	2.3 (36.1)	7.9 (46.2)	9.8 (49.6)	0.8 (33.4)	−3.6 (25.5)	−5.9 (21.4)	−11.3 (11.7)	−16.3 (2.7)
Average precipitation mm (inches)	46.5 (1.83)	52.9 (2.08)	96.6 (3.80)	104.5 (4.11)	137.1 (5.40)	177.8 (7.00)	225.5 (8.88)	136.9 (5.39)	170.7 (6.72)	100.0 (3.94)	65.0 (2.56)	55.1 (2.17)	1,365.9 (53.78)
Average precipitation days (≥ 1.0 mm)	7.8	8.7	10.9	9.6	10.4	11.8	11.6	9.4	9.9	7.6	7.5	8.8	114
Mean monthly sunshine hours	107.8	119.0	165.6	191.2	210.5	153.1	156.2	187.8	146.8	168.8	140.0	118.4	1,867.8
Source: Japan Meteorological Agency

=== Demographics ===
Per Japanese census data, the population of Jinsekikōgen in 2020 is 8,250 people. Jinsekikōgen has been conducting censuses since 1960.

Historical population
Year	Pop.	±%
1960	28,244	—
1965	23,297	−17.5%
1970	19,479	−16.4%
1975	17,114	−12.1%
1980	15,732	−8.1%
1985	14,834	−5.7%
1990	14,016	−5.5%
1995	13,218	−5.7%
2000	12,512	−5.3%
2005	11,590	−7.4%
2010	10,362	−10.6%
2015	9,217	−11.0%
2020	8,250	−10.5%
Jinsekikōgen population statistics

== History ==
The area of Jinsekikōgen is part of ancient Bingo Province, but has close cultural and economic ties neighboring Bitchū Province. During the early Edo period, it was part of the holdings of the Mizuno clan of Fukuyama Domain under the Tokugawa shogunate; however, after the attainder of that domain, most of the area became an exclave of Nakatsu Domain of Buzen Province. Following the Meiji restoration, the area was organized into villages with the creation of the modern municipalities system on April 1, 1889. Jinsekikōgen was created on November 5, 2004, from the merger of the towns of Jinseki, Yuki and Sanwa, and the village of Toyomatsu. Before Toyomatsu was incorporated, it was the last remaining village within Hiroshima Prefecture.

== Government ==
Jinsekikōgen has a mayor-council form of government with a directly elected mayor and a unicameral town council of 12 members. Jinsekikōgen, together with neighboring Fuchū, contributes one member to the Hiroshima Prefectural Assembly. In terms of national politics, the town is part of Hiroshima 5th district of the lower house of the Diet of Japan.

== Economy ==
The economy of Jinsekikōgen is largely agricultural (tomatoes, rice, konnyaku, grapes, perilla, etc.). The town is noted for its "Jinseki beef". Mining of limestone and gravel, textiles, Hydroelectric power generation, Waste disposal and forestry all play roles in the local economy.

== Education ==
Jinsekikōgen has five public elementary schools and two public middle schools operated by the town government, and one public high school operated by the Hiroshima Prefectural Board of Education.

== Transportation ==
=== Railway ===
Jinsekikōgen has no passenger rail service.The nearest train stations are Jōge Station of Michinoue Station on the JR West Fukuen Line or Tōjō Station (Hiroshima) on the JR West Geibi Line.

=== Highway ===
- National Route 182
- National Route 314

== Local attractions ==
- Taishakugawa Dam
