= Hirako Station =

Railway station in Shōbara, Hiroshima Prefecture, Japan

Hirako Station 平子駅
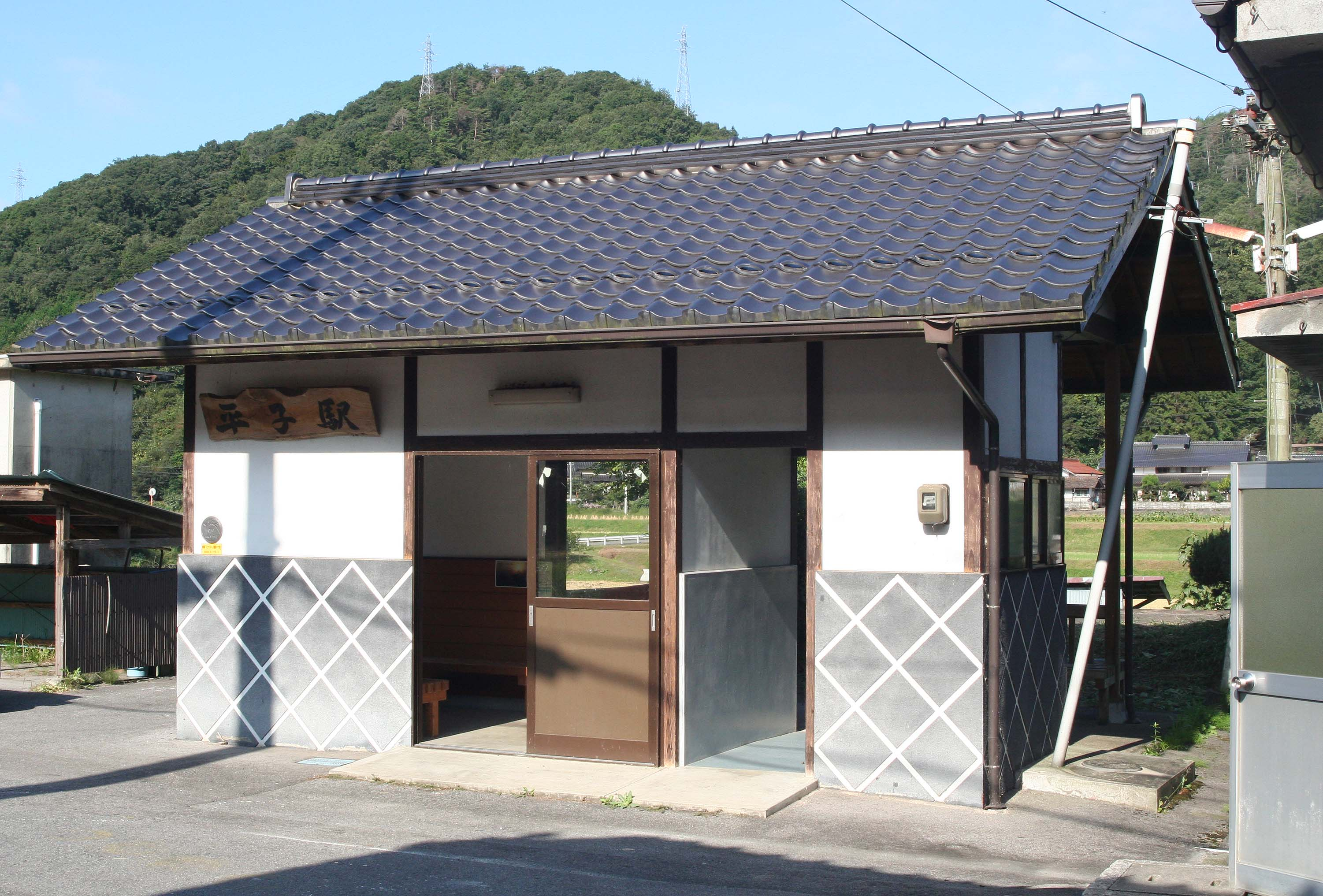
- Hirako Station (September 2007)

General information
- Location: Hirako, Saijō-chō, Shōbara-shi, Hiroshima-ken 729-5723; Japan
- Coordinates: 34°54′45.84″N 133°6′0.67″E
- Operator: JR West
- Line: P Geibi Line
- Distance: 57.4 km (35.7 miles) from Bitchū-Kōjiro
- Platforms: 1 side platform
- Tracks: 1

Other information
- Status: Unstaffed
- Website: Official website

History
- Opened: February 1, 1952

Passengers
- 2019: 4 daily

Services
Preceding station	JR West	Following station
Taka towards Hiroshima	Geibi Line Local	Bingo Saijō towards Niimi
Location
- Location within Hiroshima Prefecture Location within Japan

Hirako Station (平子駅, Hirako-eki) is a passenger railway station located in Hirako, Saijō-chō, in the city of Shōbara, Hiroshima Prefecture, Japan. It is operated by the West Japan Railway Company (JR West).

== Lines ==
Hirako Station is served by the Geibi Line, and is located 57.4 kilometers from the terminus of the line at Bitchū-Kōjiro and 63.8 kilometers from Niimi.

== Station layout ==
The station consists of one ground-level side platform serving a single bi-directional track. The station is unattended.

== History ==
Hiroko Station was opened on February 1, 1952. It became part of JR West on April 1, 1987 when Japan National Railways was privatized.

== Passenger statistics ==
In fiscal 2019, the station was used by an average of 4 passengers daily.

== Surrounding area ==
- Japan National Route 183
- Saijō River

== See also ==
- List of railway stations in Japan
