= Kōnu District, Hiroshima =

Former district in Hiroshima prefecture, Japan

Kōnu (甲奴郡, kōnu-gun) was a district located in Hiroshima Prefecture.

On March 31, 2005, the town of Sōryō, along with the towns of Hiwa, Kuchiwa, Saijō, Takano and Tōjō (all from Hiba District), was merged into the expanded city of Shōbara. Therefore, Kōnu District was dissolved as a result of this merger. The previous territory of the district is now the cities of Shōbara, Fuchū, Miyoshi, and the town of Jinsekikōgen in Jinseki District.

== The towns and villages once part of Kōnu District (at the 1889 municipal status enforcement) ==
- Arida (有田村)
- Arifuku (有福村)
- Inaga (井永村)
- Inakusa (稲草村)
- Ogaya (岡屋村)
- Ozuka (小塚村)
- Kajita (梶田村)
- Kamiryōke (上領家村)
- Kamedani (亀谷村)
- Kiya (木屋村)
- Kurome (黒目村)
- Goka (五箇村)
- Kohori (小堀村)
- Sakura (佐倉村)
- Shinami (階見村)
- Shimoryōke (下領家村)
- Jōge (上下村)
- Tarōmaru (太郎丸村)
- Chiwa (知和村)
- Tomasu (斗升村)
- Nakaryōke (中領家村)
- Nishino (西野村)
- Nukuyu (抜湯村)
- Fukuda (福田村)
- Futamori (二森村)
- Hongō (本郷村)
- Mizunaga (水永村)
- Yasuda (安田村)
- Yano (矢野村)

(Total of 29 villages)

== Timeline (since 1889) ==
- April 1, 1889 Municipal status enforced. At this time, they were 29 villages.
- October 1, 1895 The villages of Inaga, Okaya, Sakura, Tomasu, and Mizunaga merged to form the village of Kiyotake (清岳村) (25 villages).
- October 1, 1895 The villages of Kajita, Nishino, Fukuda, and Hongō merged to form the village of Kōnu (22 villages).
- October 1, 1895 The villages of Arifuku, Ozuka, Kohori, and Futamori merged to form the village of Yoshino (19 villages).
- May 7, 1897 The village of Jōge gained town status to become the town of Jōge (1st) (1 town, 18 villages)
- January 1, 1912 The villages of Inakusa, Kiya, and Shimoryōke merged to form the village of Tabusa(田総村) (1 town, 16 villages).
- November 1, 1912 The villages of Arida, Tarōmaru, Chiwa, Nukuyu, and Yasuda merged to form the village of Kamikawa (1 town, 12 villages)
- February 1, 1913 The villages of Kamiryōke, Kamedani, Kurome, Goka, and Nakaryōke merged to form the village of Ryōke (1 town, 8 villages).
- March 31, 1954 The town of Jōge and the villages of Kiyotake, Yano, Yoshino, and parts of、Shinami merged to form the town of Jōge (2nd) (1 town, 4 villages).

※The remaining parts of the village of Shinami merged into the village of (now the town of Jinsekikōgen).

- March 31, 1955 The villages of Tabusa and Ryōke merged to form the town of Sōryō (2 towns, 2 villages).
- March 31, 1955 The villages of Kōnu and parts of Kamikawa merged to form the town of Kōnu (1st) (3 towns)

※The remaining parts of the village of Kamikawa (the localities of Chiwa and several parts of the localities of Tarōmaru and Yasuda) merged into the town of Yoshiki (now the city of Miyoshi).

- October 10, 1958 The town of Kōnu (1st) absorbed the village of Hirosada (from Sera District) to create the town of Kōnu (2nd) (3 towns)
- April 1, 2004 -The town of Jōge was merged into the expanded city of Fuchū (2 towns).
- April 1, 2004 - The town of Kōnu (2nd), along with towns of Kisa, Mirasaka and Miwa, the villages of Funo, Kimita and Sakugi (all from Futami District), was merged into the expanded city of Miyoshi (2nd) (1 town).
- March 31, 2005 - The town of Sōryō, along with the towns of Hiwa, Kuchiwa, Saijō, Takano and Tōjō (all from Hiba District), was merged into the expanded city of Shōbara (2nd). Therefore, Kōnu District was dissolved as a result of this merger.

== See also ==
- List of dissolved districts of Japan
