= Hiba District, Hiroshima =

Former district in Hiroshima prefecture, Japan

Hiba (比婆郡, Hiba-gun) was a district located in Hiroshima Prefecture, Japan.

As of 2003, the district had an estimated population of 21,448 and a density of 23.00 persons per km^{2}. The total area was 932.44 km^{2}.

== Former towns and villages ==
- Hiwa
- Kuchiwa
- Saijō
- Takano
- Tōjō

== Merger ==
- On March 31, 2005 - the towns of Hiwa, Kuchiwa, Saijō, Takano and Tōjō, along with the town of Sōryō (from Kōnu District), were merged into the expanded city of Shōbara.
