= Sanwa, Hiroshima =

Town in Hiroshima Prefecture, Japan

Sanwa (三和町, Sanwa-chō) was a town located in Jinseki District, Hiroshima Prefecture, Japan.

== Population ==
As of 2003, the town had an estimated population of 4,397 and a density of 34.50 persons per km^{2}. The total area was 127.46 km^{2}.

== History ==
On November 5, 2004, Sanwa, along with the towns of Jinseki and Yuki, and the village of Toyomatsu (all from Jinseki District), was merged to create the town of Jinsekikōgen.
