= Fukayasu District, Hiroshima =

District in Hiroshima Prefecture, Japan

Fukayasu (深安郡, Fukayasu-gun) was a district located in Hiroshima Prefecture, Japan.

On October 1, 1898, the district was formed by the mergers of both Fukatsu and Yasuna Districts.

On March 1, 2006, the last remaining town of Kannabe was merged into the expanded city of Fukuyama. Therefore, Fukayasu District was dissolved as a result of this merger. The entire district is now within the city of Fukuyama.

== The list of towns and villages at the time of the creation of Fukayasu District (October 1, 1898) ==
Note: "○" is for the towns and villages of Fukatsu District and "●" is for the towns and villages of Yasuna District.

- ○Fukuyama (福山町)
- ○Ichi (市村)
- ○Oōtsuno (大津野村)
- ○Kasuga (春日村)
- ○Kamiiwanari (上岩成村)
- ●Kamitakeda (上竹田村)
- ●Kamo (加茂村)
- ●Kawakita (川北村)
- ○Kawaguchi (川口村)
- ●Kawaminami (川南村)
- ○Kinoshō (木之庄村)
- ○Shimoiwanari (下岩成村)
- ●Shimokamo (下加茂村)
- ●Shimotakeda (下竹田村)
- ○Senda (千田村)
- ●Chūjō (中条村)
- ○Tsubou (坪生村)
- ○Teshiro (手城村)
- ○Nakatsuhara (中津原村)
- ○Narazu (奈良津村)
- ○Nogami (野上村)
- ○Hikino (引野村)
- ●Hirose (広瀬村)
- ○Fukatsu (深津村)
- ●Hōjōji (法成寺村)
- ○Honjō (本庄村)
- ●Michinoue (道上村)
- ●Mino (御野村)
- ○Miyoshi (三吉村)
- ○Moriwake (森脇村)
- ●Yahiro (八尋村)
- ●Yamano (山野村)
- ●Yuda (湯田村)
- ○Yoshizu (吉津村)

(Total of 1 town and 33 villages)

== Timeline ==
- October 1, 1898 - Both Fukatsu and Yasuna District were merged to create Fukayasu District (1 town, 33 villages).
- April 1, 1913 - The villages of Nogami and Miyoshi were merged into the town of Fukuyama (1 town, 31 villages).
- July 1, 1916 - The town of Fukuyama was elevated to city status to become the city of Fukuyama (31 villages).
- March 1, 1929 - The villages of Kawakita and Kawaminami were merged to create the town of Kannabe (1 town, 29 villages).
- January 1, 1933 - The villages of Kawaguchi, Kinoshō, Teshiro, Narazu, Fukatsu, Honjō and Yoshizu were merged into the city of Fukuyama (1 town, 22 village).
- October 1, 1938 - The villages of Kamiiwanari, Shimoiwanari, Nakatsuhara, and Moriwake were merged to create the village of Gyōkō (1 town, 19 villages, the village was named after the imperial visit of the emperor in November 1930)
- February 11, 1941 - The villages of Kamitakeda, Shimotakeda and Yahiro were merged to create the village of Takehiro (竹尋村) (1 town, 17 villages).
- October 1, 1941 - The villages of Shimokamo and Hōjōji were merged to create the village of Kahō (1 town, 16 villages).
- March 31, 1954 - The town of Kannabe absorbed the villages of Takehiro, Chūjō, Michinoue, Mino and Yuda to create the town of Kannabe (1 town, 11 villages).
- March 31, 1955 - The villages of Kamo absorbed the villages of Hirose and Yamano to create the town of Kamo (2 towns, 8 villages).
- March 31, 1955 - The villages of Oōtsuno, Kasuga and Tsubou were merged to create the town of Fukayasu (3 towns, 5 villages).
- September 30, 1956 - The villages of Ichi, Senda, Hikino and Gyōkō were merged into the city of Fukuyama (3 towns, 1 village).
- September 30, 1956 - The village of Kahō was dissolved and split into the town of Kamo (the locality of Shimokamo and parts of the locality of Torigoe in Hōjōji), and the town of Ekiya (from Ashina District) (remaining parts of the locality of Hōjōji) (respectively) (3 towns).
- January 1, 1962 - The town of Fukayasu was merged into the city of Fukuyama (2 towns).
- February 1, 1975 - The town of Kamo was merged into the city of Fukuyama (1 town).

※At the same time, the town of Ekiya (from Ashina District) was also merged into the city of Fukuyama.

- March 1, 2006 - The town of Kannabe was merged into the expanded city of Fukuyama. Fukayasu District was dissolved as a result of this merger.
