= Shōbara =

Shōbara 庄原市
- City
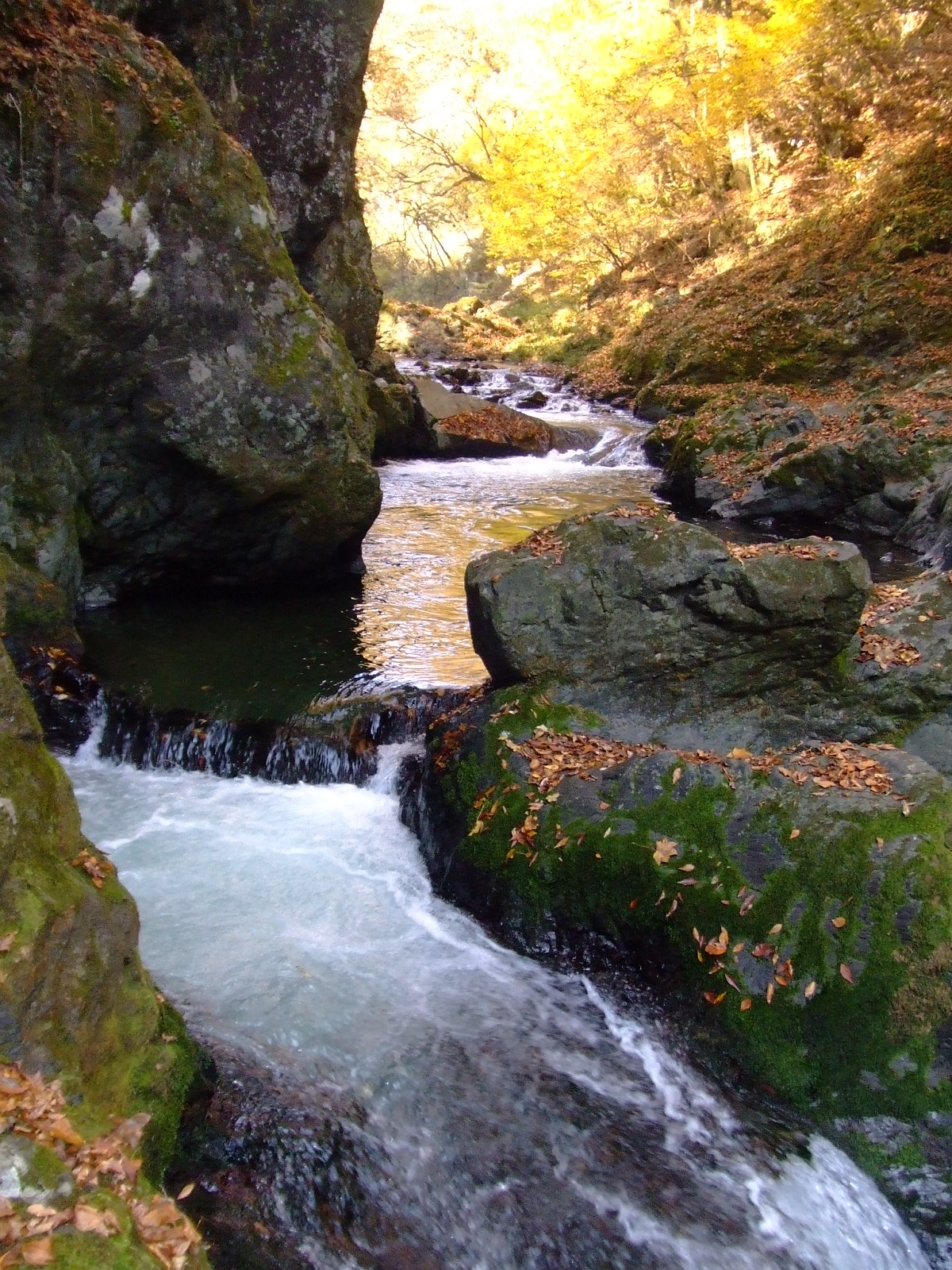
- Taishaku Valley

- Flag Seal
- Location of Shōbara in Hiroshima Prefecture

- Location in Japan
- Coordinates: 34°51′16″N 133°01′09″E
- Country: Japan
- Region: Chūgoku (San'yō)
- Prefecture: Hiroshima
- First official recorded: 507 AD（official confirmed）
- Town settled: October 1, 1898
- City settled: March 31, 1954

Government
  - Mayor: Kyōsuke Hachitani (八谷恭介) - April 2025

Area
  - Total: 1,246.49 km^{2} (481.27 sq mi)

Population (March 31, 2023)
  - Total: 32,343
  - Density: 25.947/km^{2} (67.203/sq mi)
- Time zone: UTC+09:00 (JST)
- City hall address: 1-10-1 Nakamoto-chō, Shōbara-shi, Hiroshima-ken 727-8501
- Climate: Cfa
- Website: Official website
- Symbols
- Flower: Sakura
- Tree: Siebold's beech

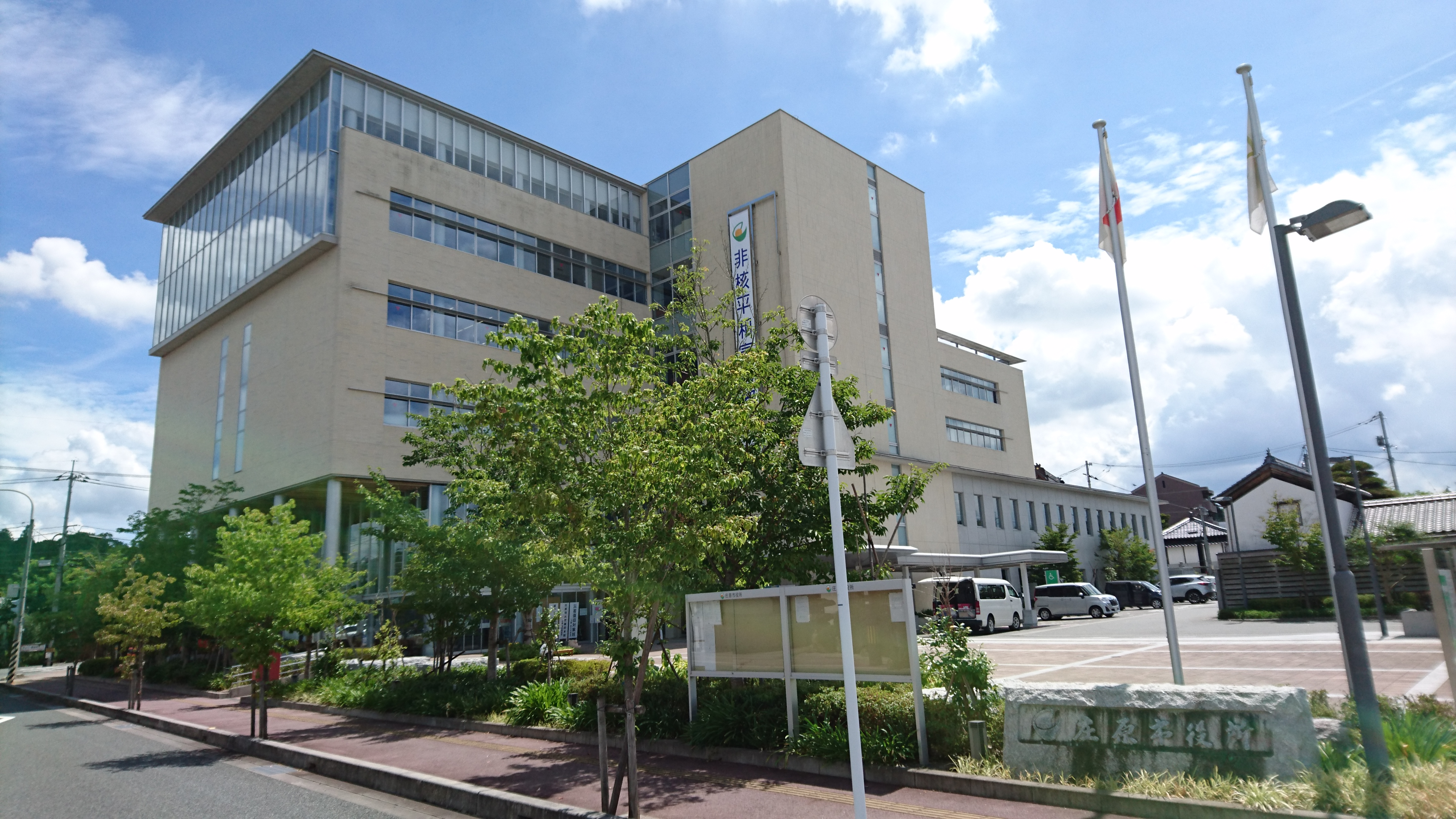
Shōbara City Hall

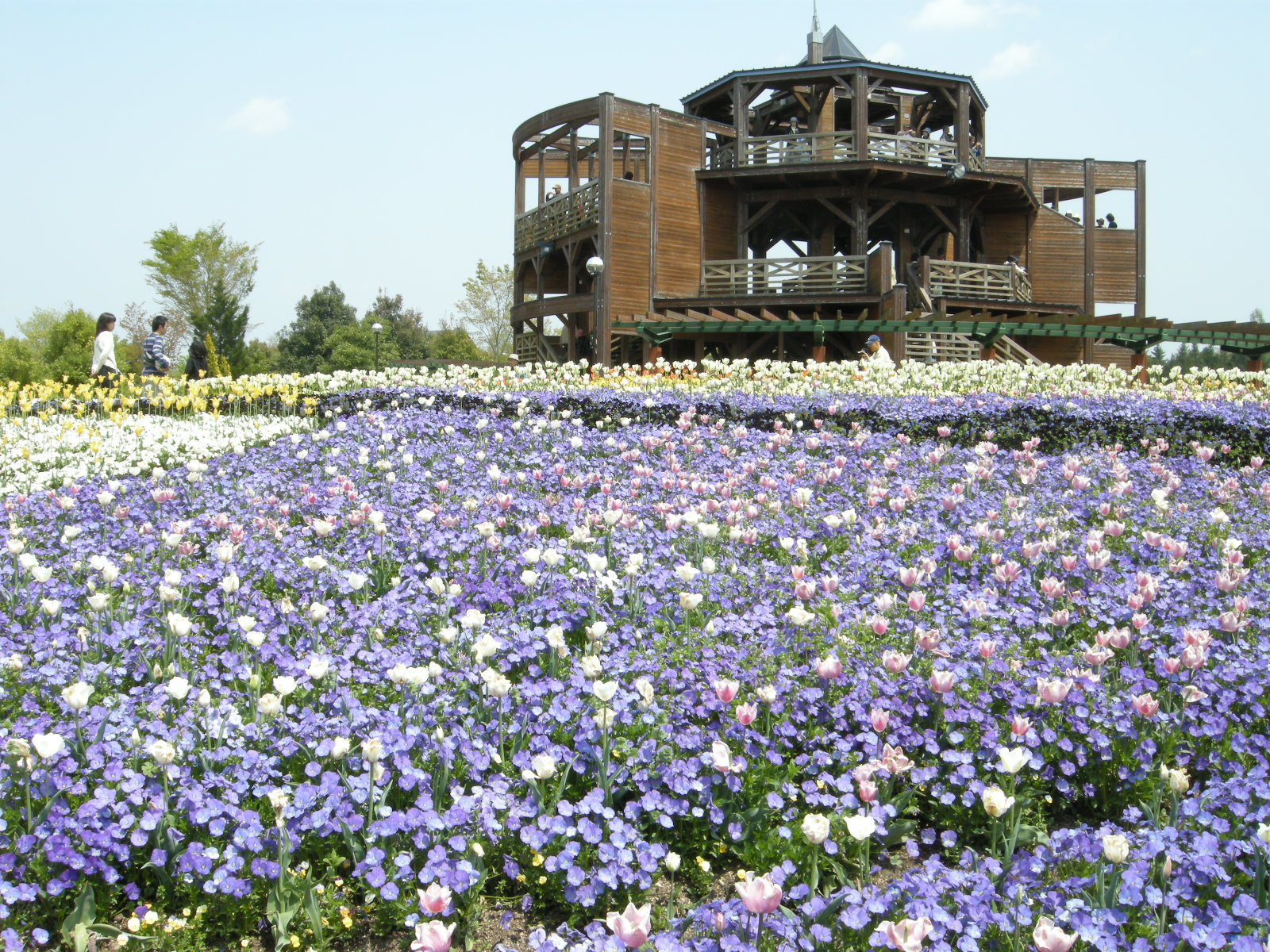
Bihoku-kyuryo Park

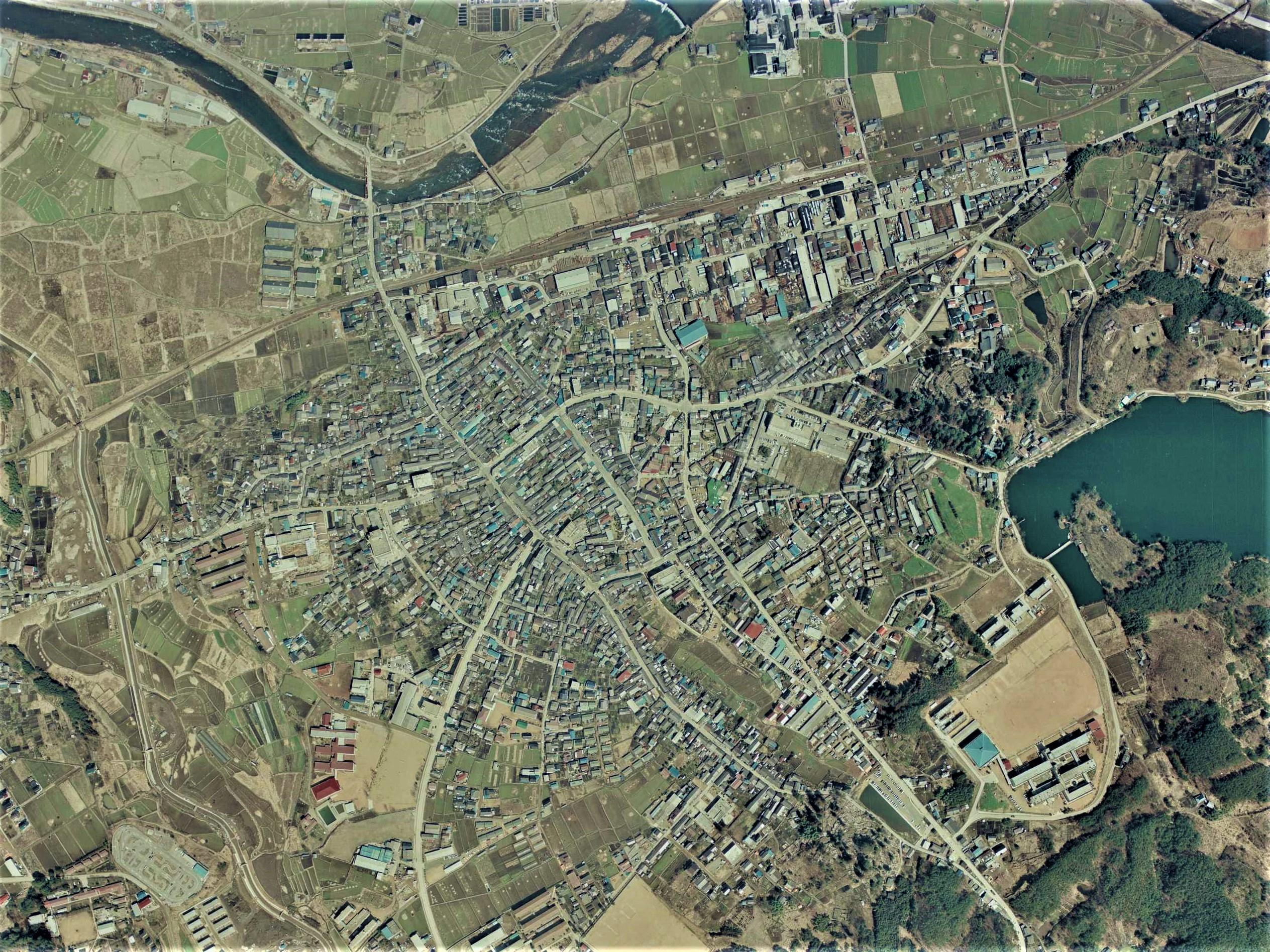
Shobara city center area aerial photograph

Shōbara (庄原市, Shōbara-shi) is a city in Hiroshima Prefecture, Japan. As of 31 March 2023, the city had an estimated population of 32,343 in 14984 households and a population density of 26 persons per km^{2}. The total area of the city is 1,246.49 square kilometres (481.27 sq mi).

== Geography ==
Shōbara is located in the Chugoku Mountains in the northeast corner of Hiroshima Prefecture.

=== Neighboring municipalities ===
Hiroshima Prefecture

- Fuchū
- Jinsekikōgen
- Miyoshi

Okayama Prefecture

- Niimi
- Takahashi

Shimane Prefecture

- Okuizumo
- Unnan

Tottori Prefecture

- Nichinan

=== Demographics ===
Per Japanese census data, the population of Shōbara in 2020 is 33,633 people. Shōbara has been conducting censuses since 1920.

Historical population
Year	Pop.	±%
1950	90,957	—
1955	88,748	−2.4%
1960	81,162	−8.5%
1965	67,983	−16.2%
1970	60,072	−11.6%
1975	56,336	−6.2%
1980	53,506	−5.0%
1985	52,157	−2.5%
1990	50,624	−2.9%
1995	48,539	−4.1%
2000	45,678	−5.9%
2005	43,149	−5.5%
2010	40,255	−6.7%
2015	37,000	−8.1%
2020	33,633	−9.1%
Shōbara population statistics

== Climate ==
Shōbara has a humid subtropical climate (Köppen climate classification Cfa) characterized by cool to mild winters and hot, humid summers. The average annual temperature in Shōbara is 12.7 °C (54.9 °F). The average annual rainfall is 1,488.8 mm (58.61 in) with July as the wettest month. The temperatures are highest on average in August, at around 25.0 °C (77.0 °F), and lowest in January, at around 1.0 °C (33.8 °F). The highest temperature ever recorded in Shōbara was 38.1 °C (100.6 °F) on 5 August 2021; the coldest temperature ever recorded was −18.5 °C (−1.3 °F) on 26 February 1991.

Climate data for Shōbara (1991–2020 normals, extremes 1976–present)
Month	Jan	Feb	Mar	Apr	May	Jun	Jul	Aug	Sep	Oct	Nov	Dec	Year
Record high °C (°F)	15.6 (60.1)	21.4 (70.5)	25.5 (77.9)	30.4 (86.7)	32.8 (91.0)	36.5 (97.7)	37.7 (99.9)	38.1 (100.6)	35.8 (96.4)	30.0 (86.0)	26.6 (79.9)	19.8 (67.6)	38.1 (100.6)
Mean daily maximum °C (°F)	6.0 (42.8)	7.8 (46.0)	12.6 (54.7)	19.1 (66.4)	23.7 (74.7)	26.3 (79.3)	29.7 (85.5)	31.2 (88.2)	26.8 (80.2)	21.0 (69.8)	14.8 (58.6)	8.3 (46.9)	19.0 (66.2)
Daily mean °C (°F)	1.0 (33.8)	2.0 (35.6)	5.6 (42.1)	11.4 (52.5)	16.4 (61.5)	20.3 (68.5)	24.2 (75.6)	25.0 (77.0)	20.6 (69.1)	14.2 (57.6)	8.2 (46.8)	3.0 (37.4)	12.7 (54.9)
Mean daily minimum °C (°F)	−2.6 (27.3)	−2.5 (27.5)	−0.2 (31.6)	4.4 (39.9)	9.8 (49.6)	15.4 (59.7)	20.2 (68.4)	20.7 (69.3)	16.1 (61.0)	9.2 (48.6)	3.3 (37.9)	−0.8 (30.6)	7.7 (45.9)
Record low °C (°F)	−11.7 (10.9)	−13.8 (7.2)	−8.5 (16.7)	−4.8 (23.4)	−1.5 (29.3)	5.1 (41.2)	9.1 (48.4)	12.4 (54.3)	3.5 (38.3)	−1.0 (30.2)	−4.2 (24.4)	−10.1 (13.8)	−13.8 (7.2)
Average precipitation mm (inches)	71.2 (2.80)	71.9 (2.83)	101.4 (3.99)	105.5 (4.15)	140.5 (5.53)	187.5 (7.38)	249.9 (9.84)	147.6 (5.81)	164.8 (6.49)	96.2 (3.79)	68.9 (2.71)	83.6 (3.29)	1,488.8 (58.61)
Average precipitation days (≥ 1.0 mm)	12.5	11.2	11.6	9.9	10.0	11.7	12.5	9.9	10.1	7.9	8.9	12.7	128.8
Mean monthly sunshine hours	89.2	106.1	154.8	181.4	196.0	139.8	147.1	180.8	143.7	153.3	124.9	93.5	1,718.9
Source: Japan Meteorological Agency (1991–2020 normals, extremes 1976–present)

Climate data for Takano, Shōbara (1991–2020 normals, extremes 1978–present)
Month	Jan	Feb	Mar	Apr	May	Jun	Jul	Aug	Sep	Oct	Nov	Dec	Year
Record high °C (°F)	13.1 (55.6)	18.4 (65.1)	22.9 (73.2)	27.8 (82.0)	30.5 (86.9)	34.2 (93.6)	35.1 (95.2)	34.6 (94.3)	32.1 (89.8)	28.0 (82.4)	23.6 (74.5)	18.6 (65.5)	35.1 (95.2)
Mean daily maximum °C (°F)	3.4 (38.1)	4.7 (40.5)	9.4 (48.9)	16.3 (61.3)	21.2 (70.2)	24.0 (75.2)	27.3 (81.1)	28.6 (83.5)	24.2 (75.6)	18.7 (65.7)	12.8 (55.0)	6.3 (43.3)	16.4 (61.5)
Daily mean °C (°F)	−0.5 (31.1)	−0.1 (31.8)	3.5 (38.3)	9.3 (48.7)	14.5 (58.1)	18.5 (65.3)	22.5 (72.5)	23.1 (73.6)	18.8 (65.8)	12.5 (54.5)	6.9 (44.4)	1.7 (35.1)	10.9 (51.6)
Mean daily minimum °C (°F)	−4.4 (24.1)	−4.7 (23.5)	−2.1 (28.2)	2.3 (36.1)	7.8 (46.0)	13.6 (56.5)	18.6 (65.5)	18.9 (66.0)	14.3 (57.7)	7.2 (45.0)	1.7 (35.1)	−2.2 (28.0)	5.9 (42.6)
Record low °C (°F)	−17.0 (1.4)	−18.5 (−1.3)	−14.9 (5.2)	−8.5 (16.7)	−3.6 (25.5)	2.4 (36.3)	5.3 (41.5)	8.9 (48.0)	0.1 (32.2)	−3.2 (26.2)	−6.4 (20.5)	−15.4 (4.3)	−18.5 (−1.3)
Average precipitation mm (inches)	147.9 (5.82)	128.0 (5.04)	150.9 (5.94)	134.4 (5.29)	156.9 (6.18)	211.3 (8.32)	294.5 (11.59)	170.1 (6.70)	189.6 (7.46)	125.9 (4.96)	104.5 (4.11)	158.0 (6.22)	1,969.4 (77.54)
Average snowfall cm (inches)	208 (82)	163 (64)	77 (30)	3 (1.2)	0 (0)	0 (0)	0 (0)	0 (0)	0 (0)	0 (0)	6 (2.4)	118 (46)	578 (228)
Average precipitation days (≥ 1.0 mm)	19.0	16.1	14.8	11.5	10.6	12.6	13.5	11.3	11.6	9.7	12.3	17.9	161.6
Mean monthly sunshine hours	51.3	66.3	128.4	178.1	196.7	140.5	134.1	160.3	128.2	143.7	108.3	69.7	1,504.1
Source: Japan Meteorological Agency (1991–2020 normals, extremes 1978–present)

== History ==
The Shōbara area is part of ancient Bingo Province. During the Edo Period, it was part of the holdings of Hiroshima Domain. Following the Meiji restoration, the village of Shōbara was established within Mikami District, Hiroshima with the creation of the modern municipalities system on April 1, 1889. Mikami District became part of Hiba District, Hiroshima on October 1, 1898 at which time Shōbara was raised to town status. On March 31, 1954 Shōbara merged with the villages of Takamura, Honda, Shikinobu, Yamauchi-Higashi, Yamauchi-Nishi, and Yamauchi-Kita and was raised to city status.

On March 31, 2005, the towns of Hiwa, Kuchiwa, Saijō, Takano, and Tōjō (all from Hiba District), and the town of Sōryō (from Kōnu District) were merged into Shōbara. Hiba District and Kōnu District were both dissolved as a result of this merger.

== Government ==
Shōbara has a mayor-council form of government with a directly elected mayor and a unicameral city council of 20 members. Shōbara contributes one member to the Hiroshima Prefectural Assembly. In terms of national politics, the city is part of the Hiroshima 5th district of the lower house of the Diet of Japan.

== Economy ==
The main economic activities in Shōbara are agriculture, mining (kaolinite, limestone) and hydroelectric power generation.

== Education ==
Shōbara has 18 public elementary schools, and seven public junior high schools operated by the city government, and five public high school operated by the Hiroshima Prefectural Board of Education. The prefecture also operates one special education school for the disabled and one agricultural college. The Prefectural University of Hiroshima has a campus in Shōbara.

== Transportation ==
=== Railway ===
JR West (JR West) - Geibi Line

- Tōjō - Bingo-Yawata - Uchina - Onuka - Dōgoyama - Bingo-Ochiai - Hibayama - Bingo-Saijō - Hirako - Taka - Bingo-Shōbara - Bingo-Mikkaichi - Nanatsuka - Yamanouchi

JR West (JR West) - Kisuki Line

- Yuki - Bingo-Ochiai

=== Highways ===
- Chūgoku Expressway
- Matsue Expressway
- National Route 182
- National Route 183
- National Route 314
- National Route 432

== Sister city relations ==
- Mianyang, Sichuan, China since September 29, 1990.

== Local attractions ==
- Taishaku Valley

== Noted people from Shōbara ==
- Ikuo Kamei, politician
- Shizuka Kamei, politician
- Shinsuke Sato, director, screenwriter
- Kōji Seo, manga artist
