= Jinseki District, Hiroshima =

District in Hiroshima prefecture, Japan

Coordinates: 34°45′29″N 133°15′54″E

Location of Jinseki District in Hiroshima Prefecture

Jinseki (神石郡, Jinseki-gun) is a district located in Hiroshima Prefecture, Japan. The district has an estimated population of 11,863. The total area is 381.81 km^{2}. (As of March 31, 2007)

The district has one town

- Jinsekikōgen

== District villages as of incorporation in 1889 ==
- Age
- Arugi
- Ueno
- Ono
- Kami
- Kamitoyomatsu
- Kameishi
- Kitsuwa
- Kusagi
- Kurumi
- Kobatake (location of district offices until 1889)
- Sasao
- Shimotoyomatsu
- Shinsaka
- Sumomo
- Takafuta
- Takamitsu
- Tandō
- Chikada
- Chichikino
- Tsunemitsu
- Nakadaira
- Nagato
- Hanazumi
- Fukunaga
- Furukawa
- Maki
- Mitsusue
- Mitsunobu
- Yuki

(30 villages in all)

== Timeline ==
- 1889年 4月1日 市町村制施行。当時の町村数は30村。
- July 1, 1897 The villages of Arugi, Kamitoyomatsu, Sasao, Shimotoyomatsu, and Nakadaira merge to form Toyomatsu Village (26 villages in district)
- July 11, 1897 Ueno, Sumomo, Chikada, and Hanazumi Villages merge to form Sen'yō Village (23 villages in district)
- August 1, 1917 Yuki Village becomes a town (1 town, 22 villages in district)
- 1940年 11月10日 草木・田頭・福永・牧各村が合併（新設合併）し、牧村（2代）が成立する（1町19村）。
- 1942年 4月1日 阿下・上・亀石・小畠・常光各村が合併（新設合併）し、小畠村（2代）が成立する（1町15村）。
- 1943年 4月1日 高光・古川両村が合併（新設合併）し、高光村（2代）が成立する（1町14村）。
- 1944年 1月1日 木津和・高蓋・父木野・光末・光信各村が合併（新設合併）し、高蓋村（2代）が成立する（1町10村）。
- 1949年 7月1日 高蓋村が 芦品郡 大正村桑木（くわぎ）を編入する。
- March 31, 1954 The village of Takafuta added parts of the village of Shinami in Kōnu District.
- 1954年 11月3日 高光・牧両村が合併（新設合併）し、神石町 が成立する（2町8村）。
- 1955年 3月31日 来見・小畠・高蓋各村が合併（新設合併）し、三和町 が成立する（3町5村）。
- 1955年3月31日 神石町が永渡村を編入する（3町4村）。
- April 1, 1955 The town of Yuki and the village of Ono and parts of Shinsaka油木町（初代）及び小野村全域、新坂村のうち新免・三坂の各一部が合併（新設合併）し、油木町（2代）が成立する（3町2村）。
- March 31, 1956 The town of Yuki and the village of Senyō merged to form the town of Yuki (3rd Generation) (3 towns, 1 village).
- July 1, 1959 The town of Sanwa added parts of the village of Fujio from Asashina District.
- November 5, 2004 The towns of Sanwa, Jinseki and Yuki, and the village of Toyomatsu merged to form the new town of Jinsekikōgen (1 town).
