= Futagozuka Kofun (Fukuyama) =

- 二子塚古墳 (Japanese)
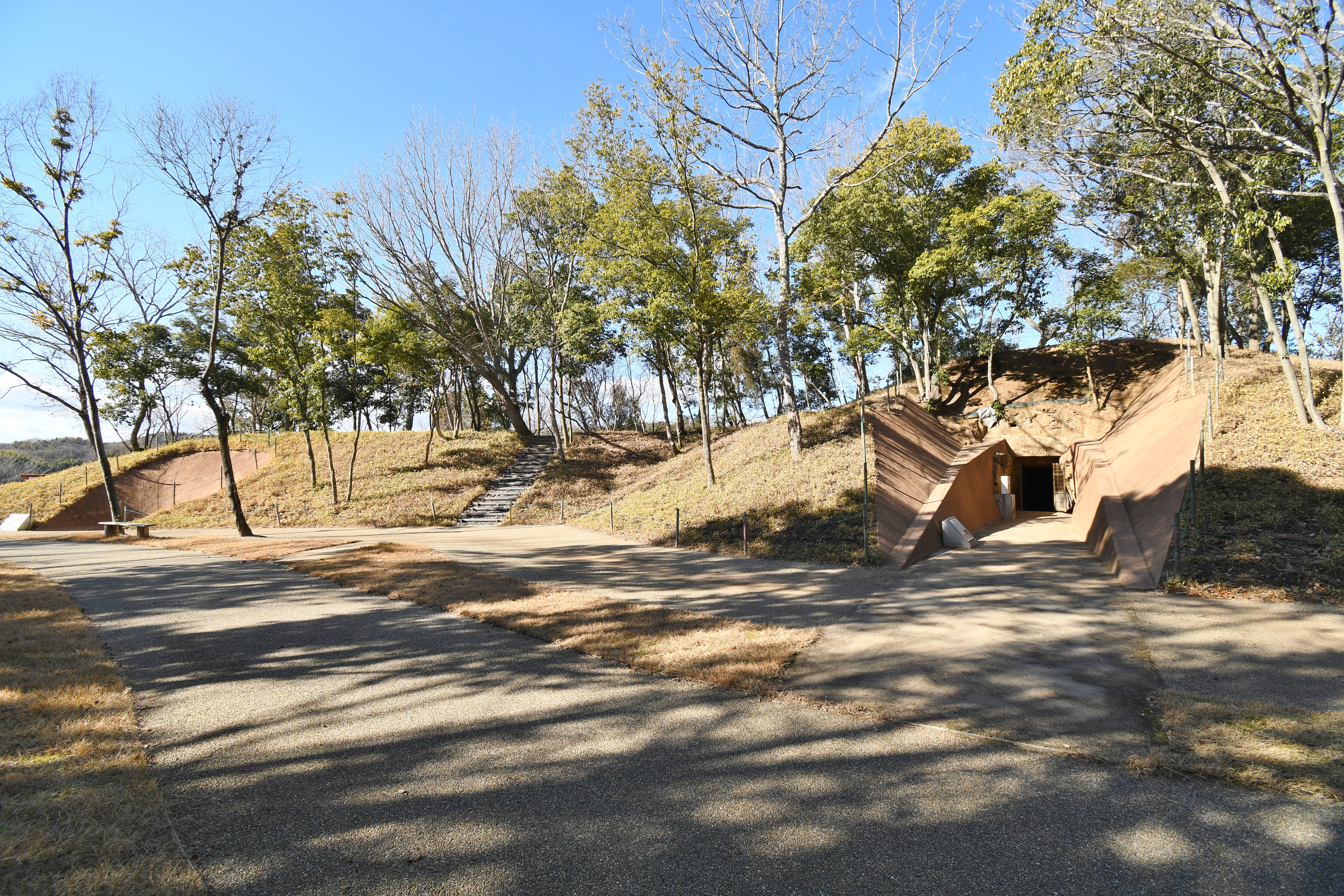
- Futagozuka Kofun

- Futagozuka Kofun Futagozuka Kofun (Fukuyama) (Japan)
- 34°33′12.5″N 133°18′44.4″E
- Type: Kofun
- Periods: Kofun period
- Location: Fukuyama, Hiroshima, Japan
- Region: San'yō region

History
- Built: late 6th to early 7th century

Site notes
- Public access: Yes (no facilities)
- National Historic Site of Japan

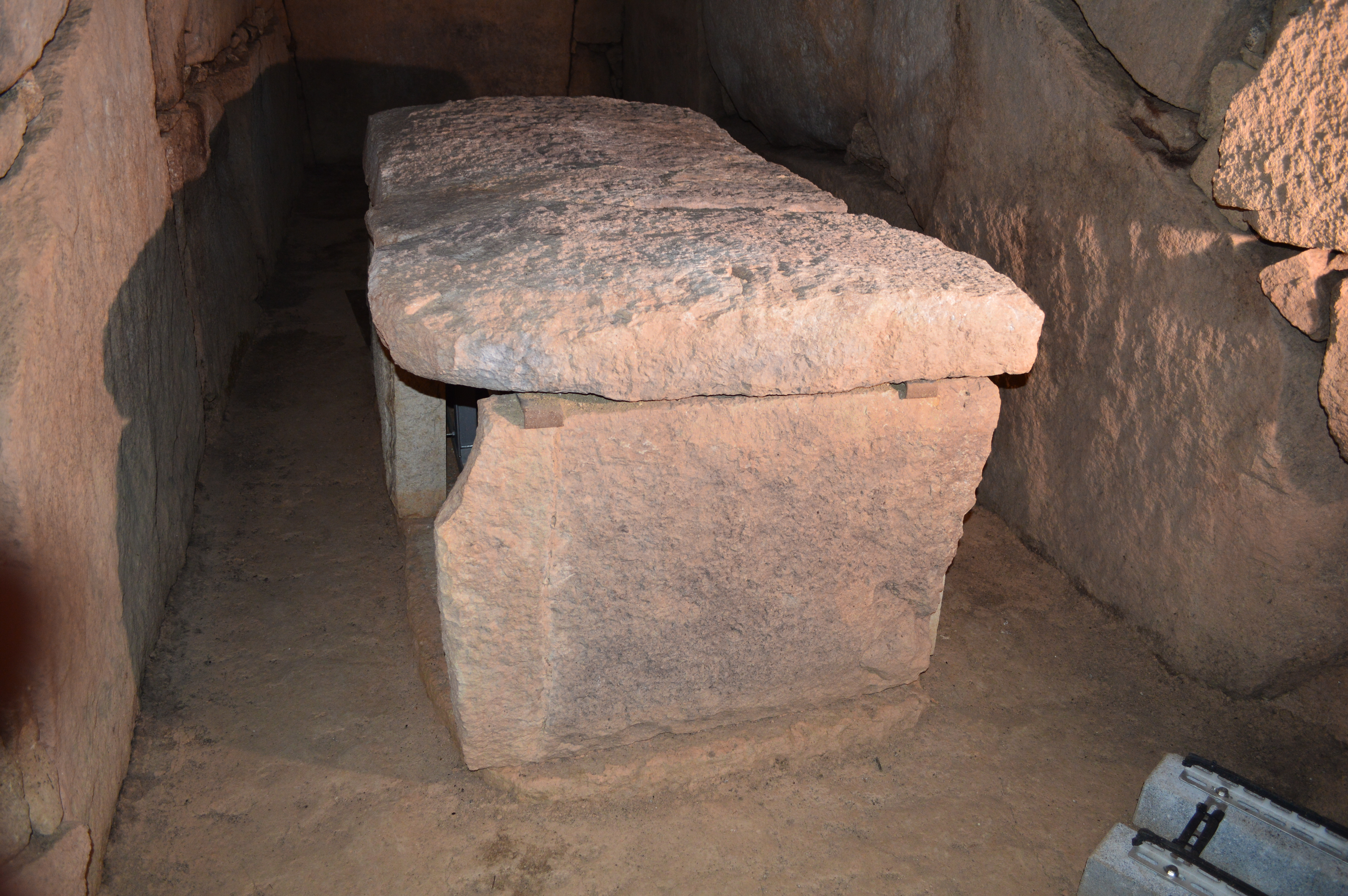
Futagozuka Kofun sarcophagus

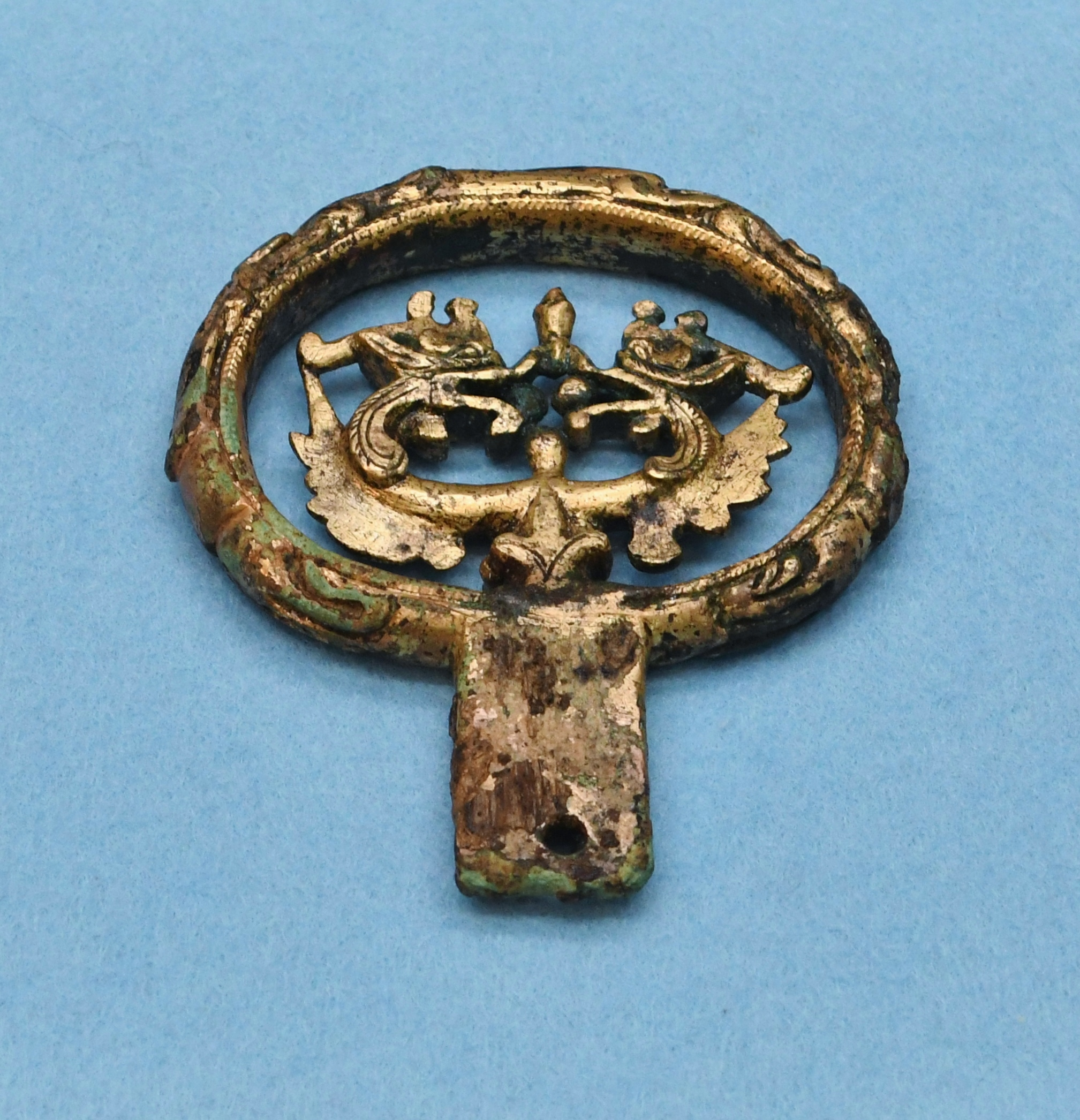
Futagozuka Kofun gilt-bronze double dragon ring pommel

Futagozuka Kofun (二子塚古墳) is a Kofun period keyhole-shaped burial mound, located in the Nakashima Ekiyacho neighborhood of the city of Fukuyama, Hiroshima in the San'yō region of Japan. The tumulus was designated a National Historic Site of Japan in 2009. It is noted for the large quantity of grave goods discovered.

== Overview ==
The Futagozuka Kofun is a zenpō-kōen-fun (前方後円墳), which is shaped like a keyhole, having one square end and one circular end, when viewed from above. It is located on a low hill about 50 meters above sea level orientated west-southwest. The ancient San'yōdō highway passes through the southern foot of the tumulus, and it is located at a strategic point for east–west traffic The tumulus is 68 meters long, with a posterior circular diameter of 41 meters, anterior width of 30 meters, and six meters in height. It is surrounded by a moat ranging from 1.6 to four meters in width and 1.8 meters deep. No haniwa or fukiishi were present at the site. The tumulus contains burial chambers in both its anterior and posterior portions. The passage to the anterior burial chamber is 12.5 meters long, making it one of the largest in the prefecture. The sarcophagus is made of tuff stone quarried in Harima Province. From 2002 to 2005, the Fukuyama City Board of Education conducted an archaeological excavation, finding that the sarcophagus had been damaged by grave robbers in antiquity and that the burial chamber had been considerably disturbed. Iron nails were found in the back of the burial chamber, suggesting that a wooden coffin was placed separately from the sarcophagus. Despite the robbery and lack of relic in situ, a considerable quantity of grave goods were still found.

These include weapons such as a gilt-bronze double dragon ring pommel from an iron sword, iron spears, and iron arrowheads, horse gear such as saddle fittings, iron nails, and knives. The gilt-bronze twin dragon ring pommel has a design in which two dragons face each other and each holds a ball in its mouth, which is unique in Japan. As for earthenware, both Haji ware and Sue ware were excavated from various places in the chamber. The Sue ware was identified as coming from kilns in Izumi Province, and date the first burial in the burial chamber to the end of the 6th century to the beginning of the 7th century. In addition, it is highly likely that additional burials were carried out in the early to mid 7th century, making this one of the final Kofun to be used in western Japan.

In the Bizen and Bitchū Provinces, huge keyhole-shaped burial mounds were built in the early and middle Kofun period, but in Bingo Province, this burial mound suddenly appeared at a later date. The fact that the sarcophagus was made of Tatsuyama stone from Harima, which was used for keyhole-shaped burial mounds in the Kinai region, instead of the locally mined wave-shaped stone indicates a strong connection with the Yamato regime in the former Kingdom of Kibi around the 7th century.

The site is open to the public at all times, but is privately owned. It is located about eight minutes on foot from Chikata Station on the JR West Fukuen Line.

== See also ==
- List of Historic Sites of Japan (Hiroshima)
