= Managura Station =

Railway station in Fukuyama, Hiroshima Prefecture, Japan

Managura Station 万能倉駅
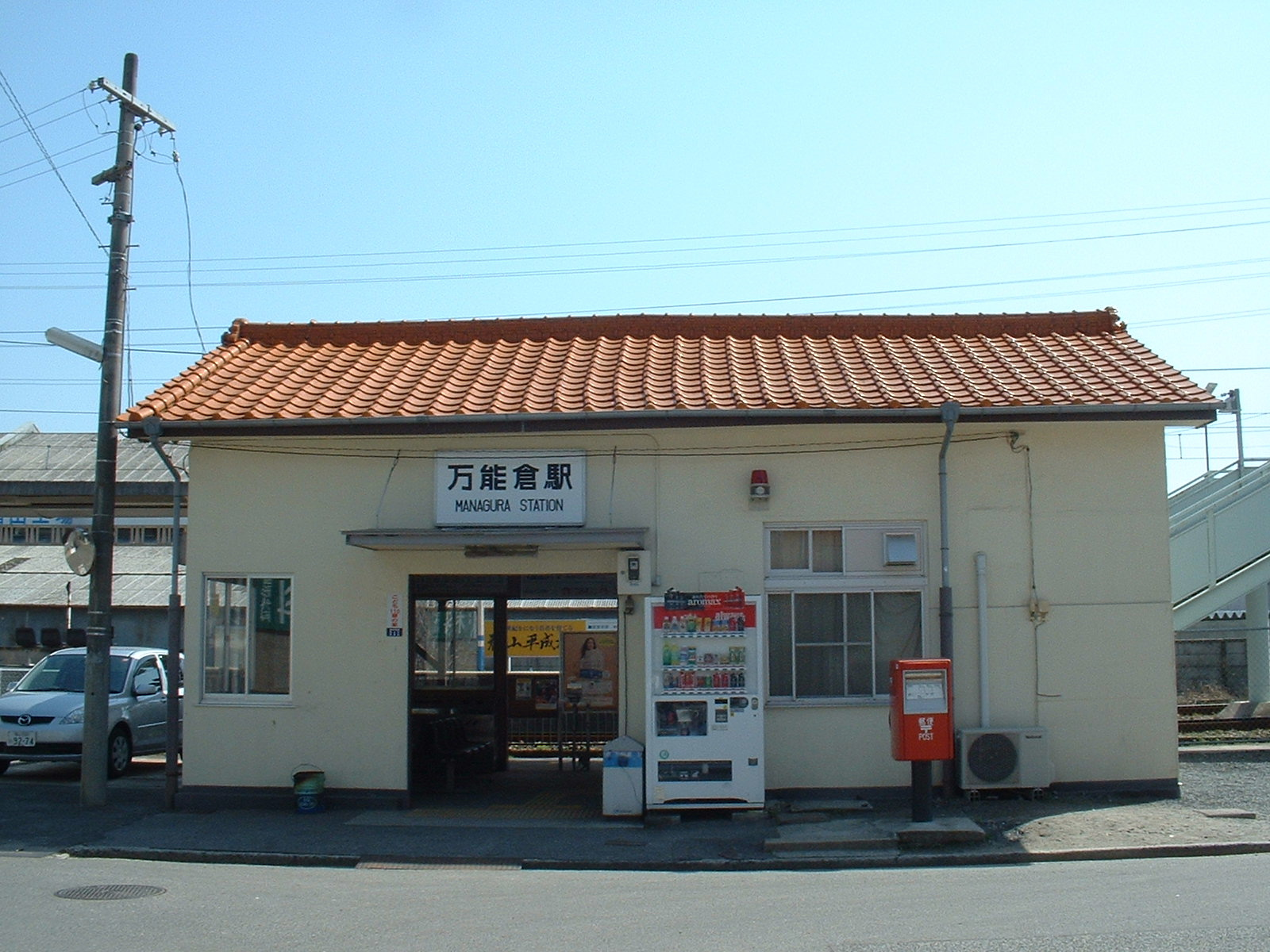
- Managura Station, March 2006

General information
- Location: 145-2 Managura Ekiya-chō, Fukuyama-shi, Hiroshima-ken 720-1131; Japan
- Coordinates: 34°33′3.87″N 133°20′17.3″E
- Owner: West Japan Railway Company
- Operator: West Japan Railway Company
- Line: Z Fukuen Line
- Distance: 6.1 km (3.8 miles) from Fukuyama
- Platforms: 1 island platform
- Tracks: 2
- Connections: Bus stop

Construction
- Structure type: Ground level
- Accessible: Yes

Other information
- Status: Unstaffed
- Website: Official website

History
- Opened: 21 July 1914

Passengers
- FY2019: 794 daily

Services
Preceding station	JR West	Following station
Ekiya towards Miyoshi	Fukuen Line Local	Michinoue towards Fukuyama
Location
- Location within Hiroshima Prefecture Location within Japan

Managura Station (万能倉駅, Managura-eki) is a passenger railway station located in the city of Fukuyama, Hiroshima Prefecture, Japan. It is operated by the West Japan Railway Company (JR West).

== Lines ==
Managura Station is served by the JR West Fukuen Line, and is located 13.4 kilometers from the terminus of the line at Fukuyama.

== Station layout ==
The station consists of one island platform connected to the station building by an open footbridge. The station is unattended.

=== Platforms ===
1	■ Z Fukuen Line	for Fukuyama
2	■ Z Fukuen Line	for Kannabe and Fuchū

== History ==
Managura Station was opened on 21 July 1914. With the privatization of the Japanese National Railways (JNR) on 1 April 1987, the station came under the control of JR West.

== Passenger statistics ==
In fiscal 2019, the station was used by an average of 794 passengers daily.

== Surrounding area ==
- Fukuyama Heisei University
- Hiroshima Prefectural Fukuyama Kita Special Needs School

== See also ==
- List of railway stations in Japan
