= Takagi Station (Hiroshima) =

Railway station in Fuchū, Hiroshima Prefecture, Japan

Takagi Station 高木駅
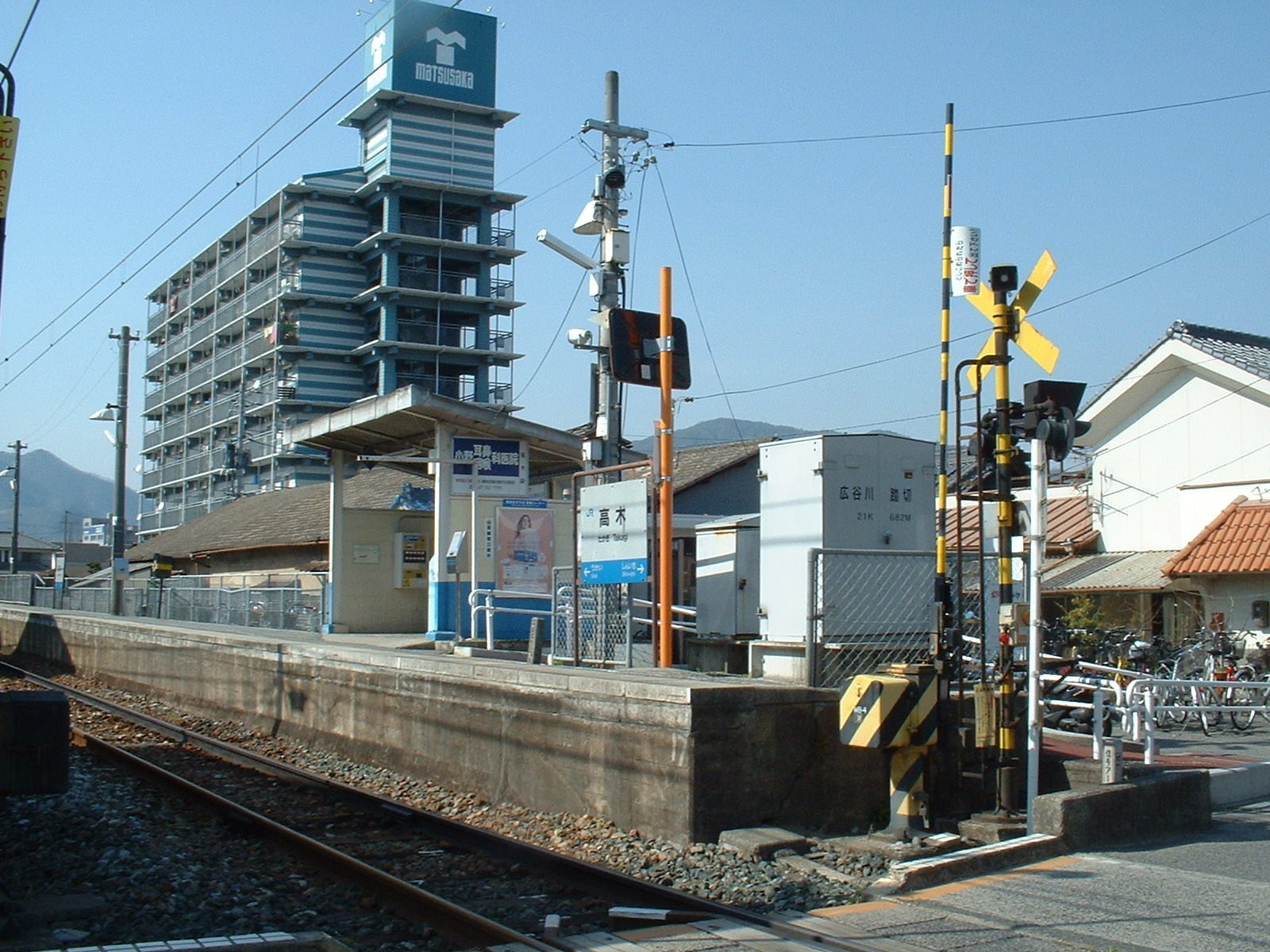
- Takagi Station, March 2006

General information
- Location: 39-5 Takagi-chō, Fuchū-shi, Hiroshima-ken 726-0013; Japan
- Coordinates: 34°33′46.14″N 133°15′13.22″E
- Owner: West Japan Railway Company
- Operator: West Japan Railway Company
- Line: Z Fukuen Line
- Distance: 21.7 km (13.5 miles) from Fukuyama
- Platforms: 1 side platform
- Tracks: 1
- Connections: Bus stop

Construction
- Structure type: Ground level
- Accessible: Yes

Other information
- Status: Unstaffed
- Website: Official website

History
- Opened: 21 July 1914

Passengers
- FY2019: 264

Services
Preceding station	JR West	Following station
Ukai towards Miyoshi	Fukuen Line Local	Shin-ichi towards Fukuyama
Location
- Location within Hiroshima Prefecture Location within Japan

Takagi Station (高木駅, Takagi-eki) is a passenger railway station located in the city of Fuchū, Hiroshima Prefecture, Japan. It is operated by the West Japan Railway Company (JR West).

== Lines ==
Takagi Station is served by the JR West Fukuen Line, and is located 21.7 kilometers from the terminus of the line at Fukuyama.

== Station layout ==
The station consists of one side platform serving a single bi-directional track. There is no station building and the station is unattended. An automatic ticket vending machine is installed in the waiting area on the platform.

== History ==
Takagi Station was opened on 21 July 1914 as the Takagi Stop (高木停留場, Takagi teiryūba). It was elevated to a full passenger station on 1 September 1933. With the privatization of the Japanese National Railways (JNR) on 1 April 1987, the station came under the control of JR West.

== Passenger statistics ==
In fiscal 2019, the station was used by an average of 264 passengers daily.

== Surrounding area ==
- Fuchu City Public Health and Welfare Center
- Fuchu Municipal Kokufu Elementary School

== See also ==
- List of railway stations in Japan
