= Tode Station =

Railway station in Fukuyama, Hiroshima Prefecture, Japan

Tode Station 戸手駅
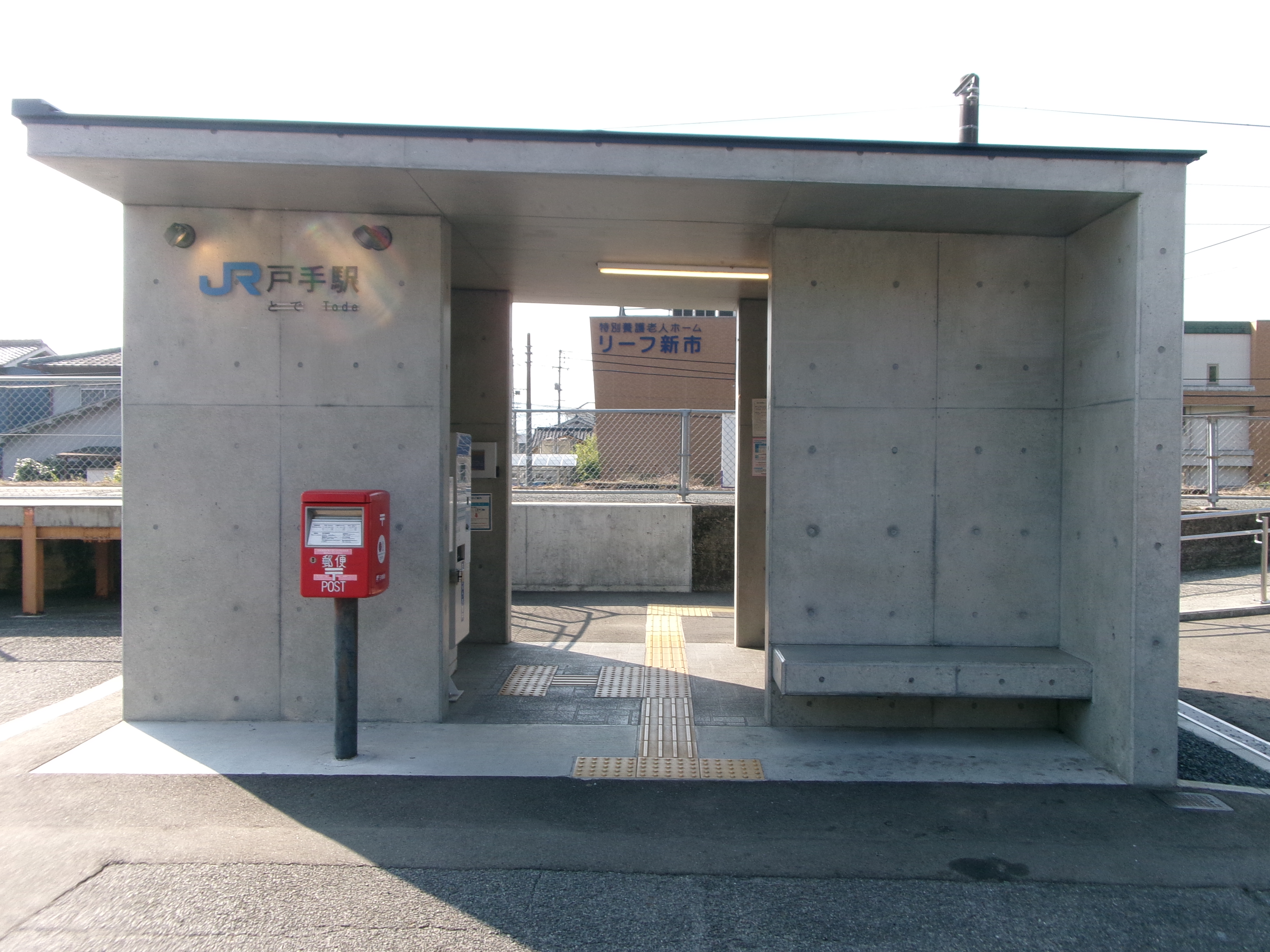
- Tode Station, November 2023

General information
- Location: Tode Shinichi-chō, Fukuyama-shi, Hiroshima-ken 729-3101; Japan
- Coordinates: 34°32′47.5″N 133°18′3.41″E
- Owner: West Japan Railway Company
- Operator: West Japan Railway Company
- Line: Z Fukuen Line
- Distance: 17.0 km (10.6 miles) from Fukuyama
- Platforms: 1 side platform
- Tracks: 1
- Connections: Bus stop

Construction
- Structure type: Ground level
- Accessible: Yes

Other information
- Status: Unstaffed
- Website: Official website

History
- Opened: 21 July 1914

Services
Preceding station	JR West	Following station
Kamitode towards Miyoshi	Fukuen Line Local	Chikata towards Fukuyama
Location
- Location within Hiroshima Prefecture Location within Japan

Tode Station (戸手駅, Tode-eki) is a passenger railway station located in the city of Fukuyama, Hiroshima Prefecture, Japan. It is operated by the West Japan Railway Company (JR West).

== Lines ==
Tode Station is served by the JR West Fukuen Line, and is located 17.0 kilometers from the terminus of the line at Fukuyama.

== Station layout ==
The station consists of one side platform serving a single bi-directional track. It formerly had two opposed side platforms, and the remains of the abandoned platform remain in situ. A concrete waiting room was constructed in February 2021. The station is unattended.

== History ==
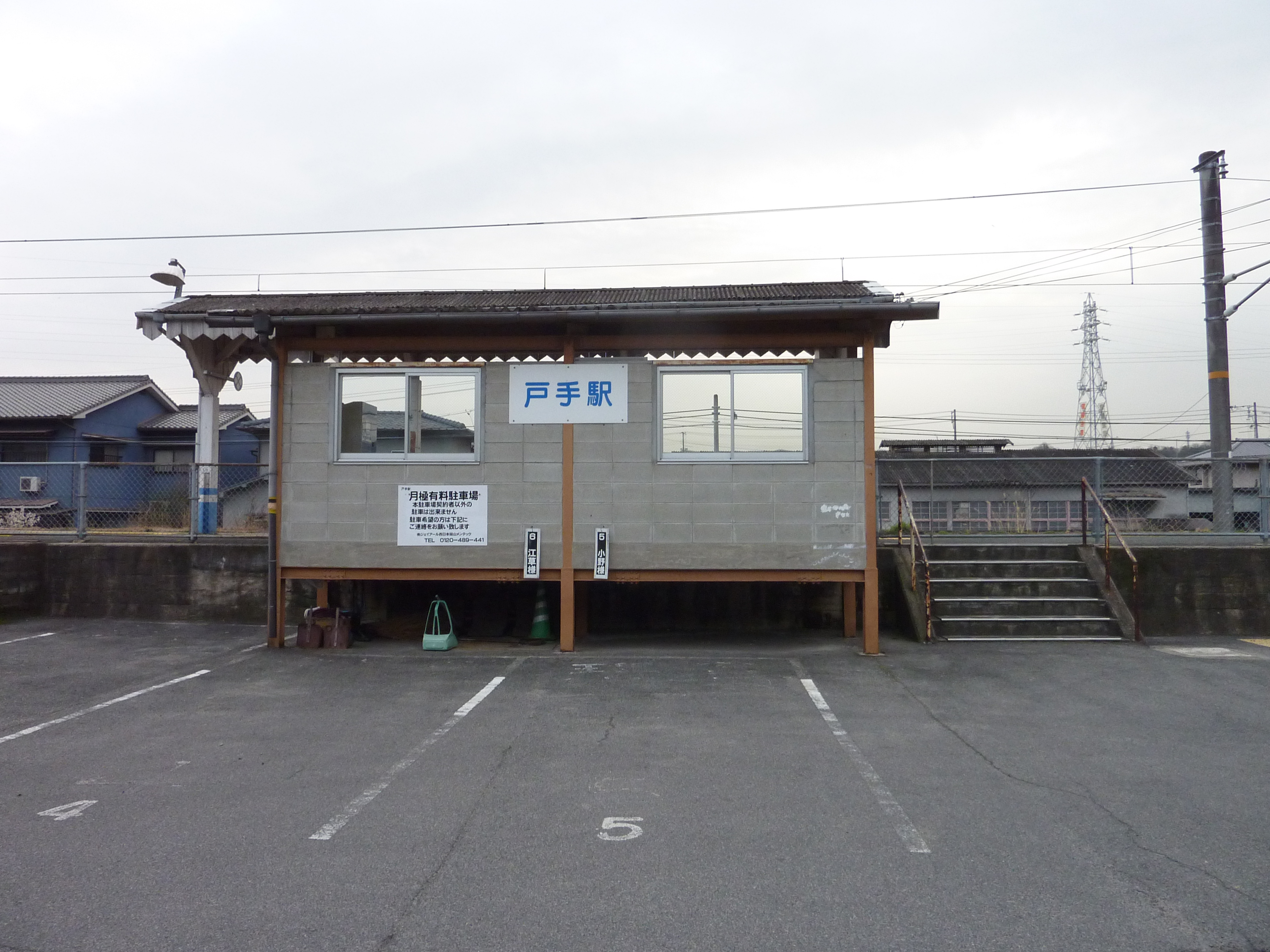
Tode Station, March 2010

Tode Station was opened on 21 July 1914 as the Tode Stop (戸手停留場, Tode teiryūba). It was elevated to a full station on 12 January 1925. With the privatization of the Japanese National Railways (JNR) on 1 April 1987, the station came under the control of JR West.

== Surrounding area ==
- Japan National Route 486
- Hiroshima Prefectural Ashina Manabi Gakuen High School

== See also ==
- List of railway stations in Japan
