= Chikata Station =

Railway station in Fukuyama, Hiroshima Prefecture, Japan

Chikata Station 近田駅
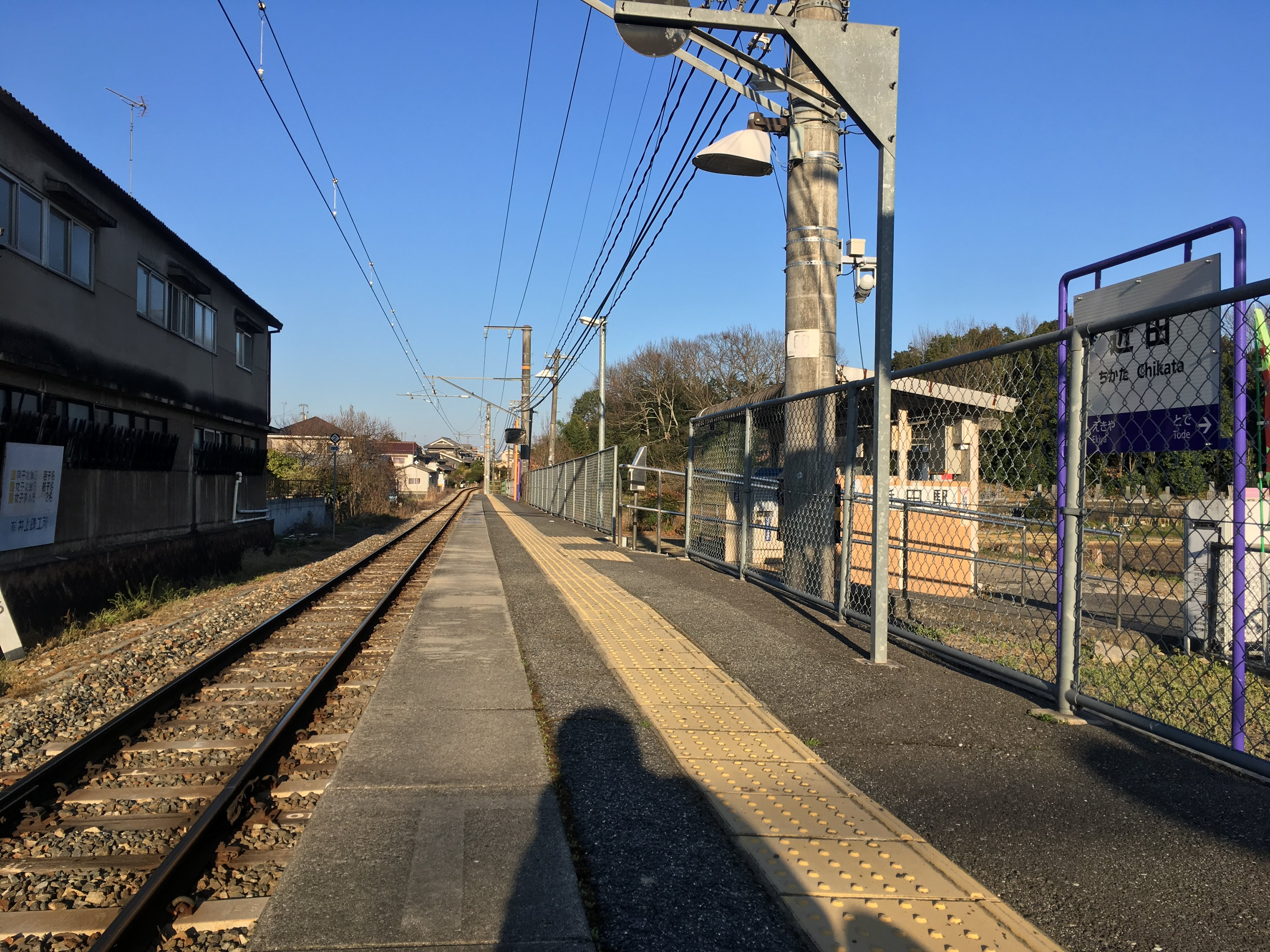
- Chikata Station, March 2019

General information
- Location: 547-7 Chikata Ekiya-chō, Fukuyama-shi, Hiroshima-ken 720-1133; Japan
- Coordinates: 34°32′18″N 133°18′39.45″E
- Owner: West Japan Railway Company
- Operator: West Japan Railway Company
- Line: Z Fukuen Line
- Distance: 16.0 km (9.9 miles) from Fukuyama
- Platforms: 1 side platform
- Tracks: 1
- Connections: Bus stop

Construction
- Structure type: Ground level
- Accessible: Yes

Other information
- Status: Unstaffed
- Website: Official website

History
- Opened: 21 July 1914

Services
Preceding station	JR West	Following station
Tode towards Miyoshi	Fukuen Line Local	Ekiya towards Fukuyama
Location
- Location within Hiroshima Prefecture Location within Japan

Chikata Station (近田駅, Chikata-eki) is a passenger railway station located in the city of Fukuyama, Hiroshima Prefecture, Japan. It is operated by the West Japan Railway Company (JR West).

== Lines ==
Chikata Station is served by the JR West Fukuen Line, and is located 16.0 kilometers from the terminus of the line at Fukuyama.

== Station layout ==
The station consists of one side platform serving a single bi-directional track. There is no station building, only a small shelter on the platform, and the station is unattended.

== History ==
Chikata Station was opened on 21 July 1914. With the privatization of the Japanese National Railways (JNR) on 1 April 1987, the station came under the control of JR West.

== Surrounding area ==
- Fukuyama Heisei University
- Hiroshima Prefectural Fukuyama Kita Special Needs School

== See also ==
- List of railway stations in Japan
