= Ekiya Station =

Railway station in Fukuyama, Hiroshima Prefecture, Japan

Ekiya Station 駅家駅
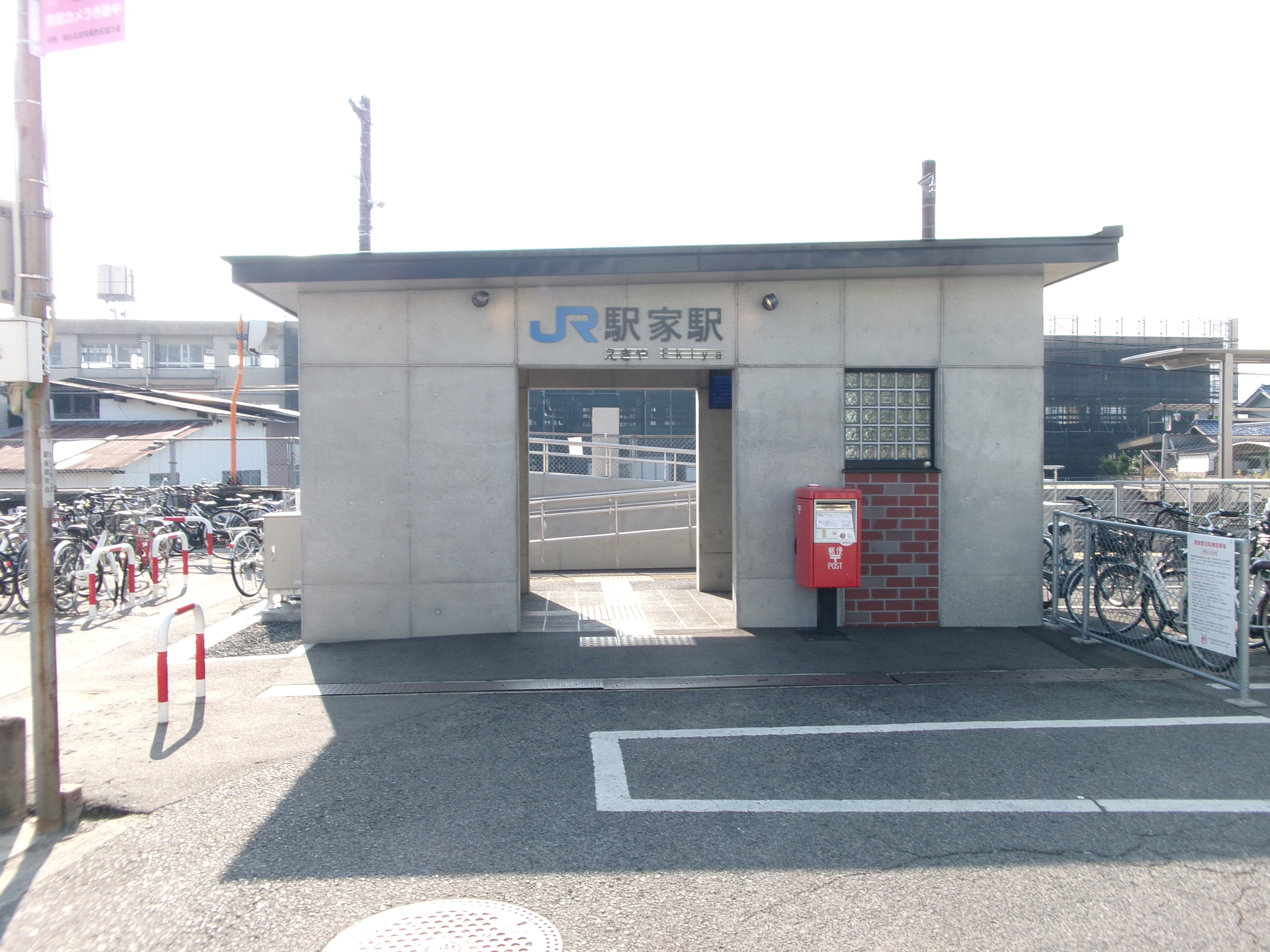
- Ekiya Station, November 2023

General information
- Location: 89-4 Kuramitsu, Ekiya-chō, Fukuyama-shi, Hiroshima-ken; Japan
- Coordinates: 34°32′56.68″N 133°19′33.19″E
- Owner: West Japan Railway Company
- Operator: West Japan Railway Company
- Line: Z Fukuen Line
- Distance: 14.6 km (9.1 miles) from Fukuyama
- Platforms: 1 side platform
- Tracks: 1
- Connections: Bus stop

Construction
- Structure type: Ground level
- Accessible: Yes

Other information
- Status: Unstaffed
- Website: Official website

History
- Opened: 21 July 1914

Passengers
- FY2019: 726 daily

Services
Preceding station	JR West	Following station
Chikata towards Miyoshi	Fukuen Line Local	Managura towards Fukuyama
Location
- Location within Hiroshima Prefecture Location within Japan

Ekiya Station (駅家駅, Ekiya-eki) is a passenger railway station located in the city of Fukuyama, Hiroshima Prefecture, Japan. It is operated by the West Japan Railway Company (JR West).

== Lines ==
Ekiya Station is served by the JR West Fukuen Line, and is located 14.6 kilometers from the terminus of the line at Fukuyama.

== Station layout ==
This is an above-ground station (stop) with a single side platform located on the right side of the single track when facing toward Fuchu. The station building, a wooden structure built before World War II, was in use until February 2, 2021. The men's and women's flush toilet was in use until September 2020, when it was demolished to make way for the station building reconstruction. The site is now used as a bicycle parking lot. A new concrete station building was put into service on February 3, 2021. The station is currently unstaffed and managed by Fukuyama Station, but until February 29, 2020, JR West Okayama Mentech was entrusted with station operations.

== History ==
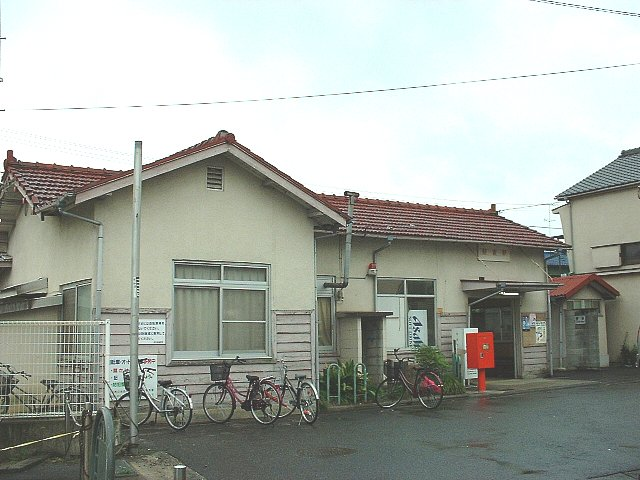
Ekiya Station, February 2006

Eikya Station was opened on 21 July 1914. With the privatization of the Japanese National Railways (JNR) on 1 April 1987, the station came under the control of JR West.

== Passenger statistics ==
In fiscal 2019, the station was used by an average of 726 passengers daily.

== Surrounding area ==
- Japan National Route 486
- Fukuyama City Northern Branch office
- Fukuyama Municipal Ekiya Elementary School
- Fukuyama Municipal Station House Kita Elementary School
- Fukuyama Municipal Ekiya Nishi Elementary School

== See also ==
- List of railway stations in Japan
