= Kajita Station =

Railway station in Miyoshi, Hiroshima Prefecture, Japan

Kajita Station 梶田駅
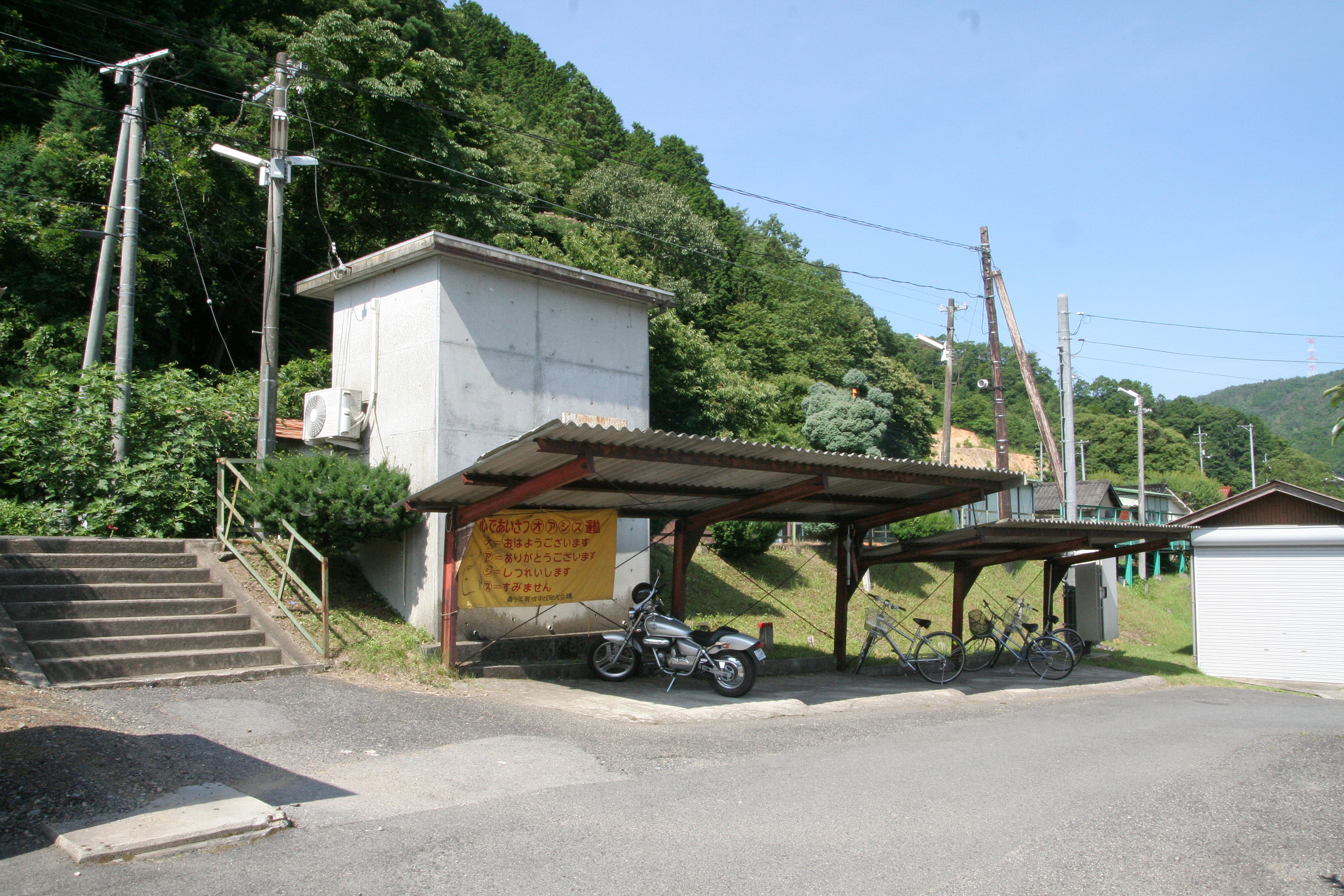
- Kajita Station, July 2008

General information
- Location: Kajita Kōnu-chō, Miyoshi-shi, Hiroshima-ken 729-4105; Japan
- Coordinates: 34°42′30.63″N 133°3′31.59″E
- Owner: West Japan Railway Company
- Operator: West Japan Railway Company
- Line: Z Fukuen Line
- Distance: 57.1 km (35.5 miles) from Fukuyama
- Platforms: 1 side platform
- Tracks: 1
- Connections: Bus stop

Construction
- Structure type: Ground level
- Accessible: Yes

Other information
- Status: Unstaffed
- Website: Official website

History
- Opened: 1 October 1963

Passengers
- FY2019: 5

Services
Preceding station	JR West	Following station
Bingo-Yasuda towards Miyoshi	Fukuen Line Local	Kōnu towards Fukuyama
Location
- Location within Hiroshima Prefecture Location within Japan

Kajita Station (梶田駅, Kajita-eki) is a passenger railway station located in the city of Miyoshi, Hiroshima Prefecture, Japan. It is operated by the West Japan Railway Company (JR West).

== Lines ==
Kajita Station is served by the JR West Fukuen Line, and is located 57.1 kilometers from the terminus of the line at Fukuyama.

== Station layout ==
The station consists of one side platform serving a single bi-directional track. There is no station building and the station is unattended.

== History ==
Kajita Station was opened on 1 October 1963. With the privatization of the Japanese National Railways (JNR) on 1 April 1987, the station came under the control of JR West.

== Passenger statistics ==
In fiscal 2019, the station was used by an average of 5 passengers daily.

== Surrounding area ==
- Hiroshima Prefectural Road No. 27 Kisa Abuki Line
- Hiroshima Prefectural Route 425 Kajita Sirasaka Line

== See also ==
- List of railway stations in Japan
