= Bingo-Yasuda Station =

Railway station in Miyoshi, Hiroshima Prefecture, Japan

Bingo-Yasuda Station 備後安田駅
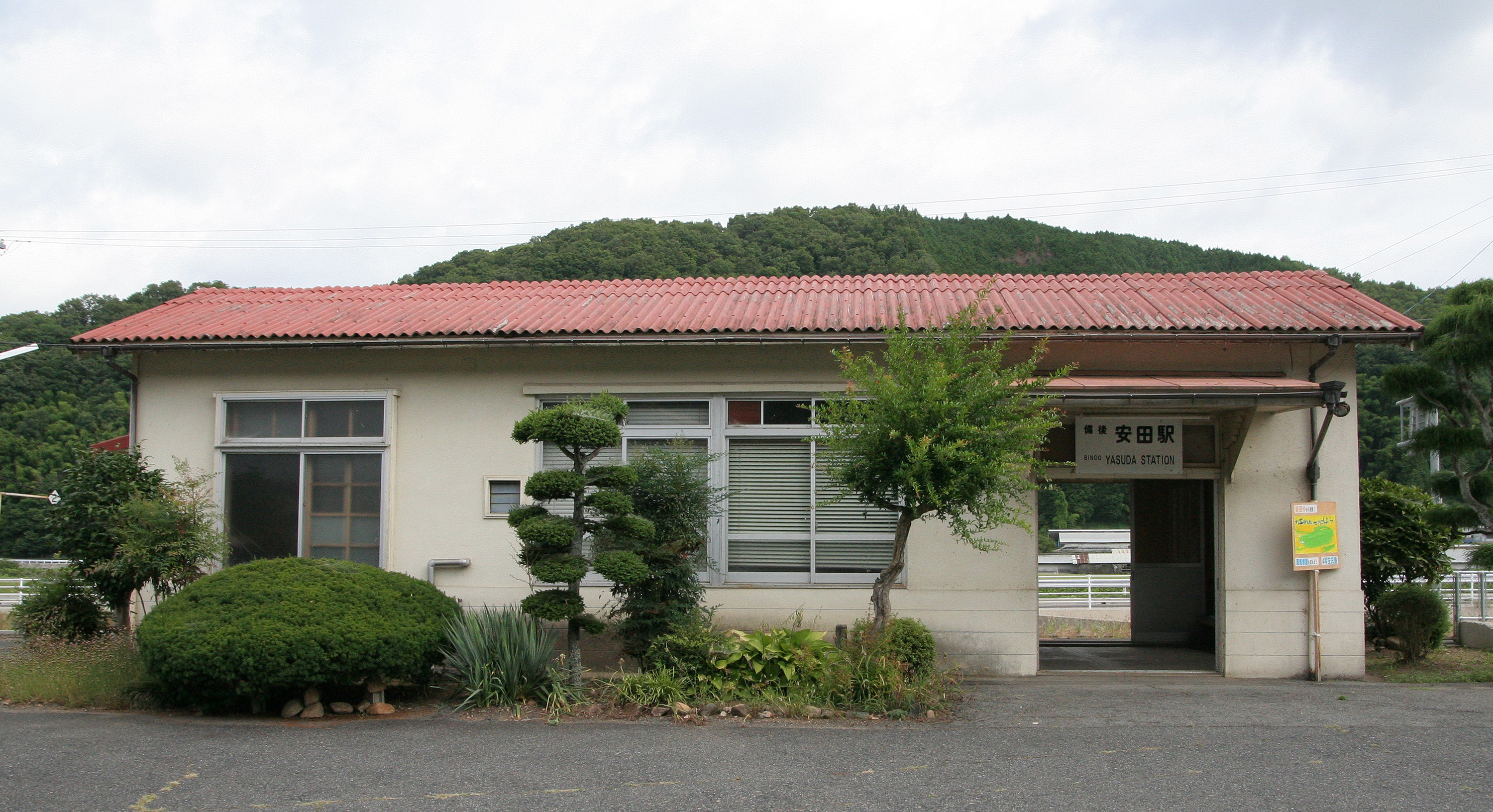
- Bingo-Yasuda Station, July 2008

General information
- Location: 1568-1 Yasuda Kisa-chō, Miyoshi-shi, Hiroshima-ken 729-4203; Japan
- Coordinates: 34°44′27.79″N 133°02′1.42″E
- Owner: West Japan Railway Company
- Operator: West Japan Railway Company
- Line: Z Fukuen Line
- Distance: 62.3 km (38.7 miles) from Fukuyama
- Platforms: 1 side platform
- Tracks: 1
- Connections: Bus stop

Construction
- Structure type: Ground level
- Accessible: Yes

Other information
- Status: Unstaffed
- Website: Official website

History
- Opened: 15 November 1935

Passengers
- FY2019: 7

Services
Preceding station	JR West	Following station
Kisa towards Miyoshi	Fukuen Line	Kajita towards Fukuyama
Location
- Location within Hiroshima Prefecture Location within Japan

Bingo-Yasuda Station (備後安田駅, Bingo-Yasuda-eki) is a passenger railway station located in the city of Miyoshi, Hiroshima Prefecture, Japan. It is operated by the West Japan Railway Company (JR West).

== Lines ==
Bingo-Yasuda Station is served by the JR West Fukuen Line, and is located 62.3 kilometers from the terminus of the line at Fukuyama.

== Station layout ==
The station consists of one side platform serving a single bi-directional track. The station is unattended.

== History ==
Bingo-Yasuda Station was opened on 15 November 1935. With the privatization of the Japanese National Railways (JNR) on 1 April 1987, the station came under the control of JR West.

== Passenger statistics ==
In fiscal 2019, the station was used by an average of 7 passengers daily.

== Surrounding area ==
- Miyoshi Municipal Yasuda Elementary School
- Hiroshima Prefectural Route 425 Kajita Sirasaka Line
- Hiroshima Prefectural Route 426 Taromaru Kisa Line

== See also ==
- List of railway stations in Japan
