= Michinoue Station =

Railway station in Fukuyama, Hiroshima Prefecture, Japan

Michinoue Station 道上駅
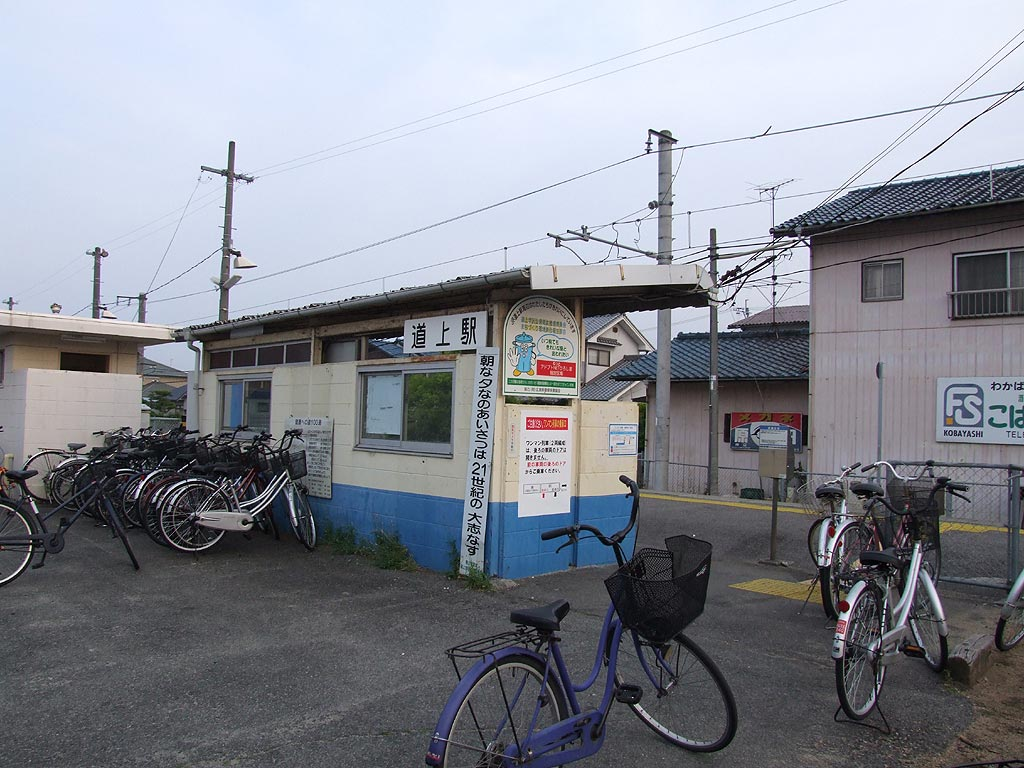
- Michinoue Station, May 2008

General information
- Location: 754-5 Michinoue, Fukuyama-shi, Hiroshima-ken 720-2104; Japan
- Coordinates: 34°33′12.46″N 133°21′41.82″E
- Owner: West Japan Railway Company
- Operator: West Japan Railway Company
- Line: Z Fukuen Line
- Distance: 11.3 km (7.0 miles) from Fukuyama
- Platforms: 1 side platform
- Tracks: 1
- Connections: Bus stop

Construction
- Structure type: Ground level
- Accessible: Yes

Other information
- Status: Unstaffed
- Website: Official website

History
- Opened: 21 July 1914

Passengers
- FY2019: 708 daily

Services
Preceding station	JR West	Following station
Managura towards Miyoshi	Fukuen Line Local	Yudamura towards Fukuyama
Location
- Location within Hiroshima Prefecture Location within Japan

Michinoue Station (道上駅, Michinoue-eki) is a passenger railway station located in the city of Fukuyama, Hiroshima Prefecture, Japan. It is operated by the West Japan Railway Company (JR West).

== Lines ==
Michinoue Station is served by the JR West Fukuen Line, and is located 11.3 kilometers from the terminus of the line at Fukuyama.

== Station layout ==
The station consists of one side platform serving a single bi-directional track. There is no station building, and the station is unattended.

== History ==
Michinoue Station was opened on 21 July 1914 as the Michinoue Stop (道上停留場, Michinoue teiryūba). It was elevated to a full station on 29 June 1920. With the privatization of the Japanese National Railways (JNR) on 1 April 1987, the station came under the control of JR West.

== Passenger statistics ==
In fiscal 2019, the station was used by an average of 708 passengers daily.

== Surrounding area ==
- Fukuyama City Kannabe Nishi Junior High School
- Japan National Route 182

== See also ==
- List of railway stations in Japan
