= Kisa Station =

Railway station in Miyoshi, Hiroshima Prefecture, Japan

Kisa Station 吉舎駅
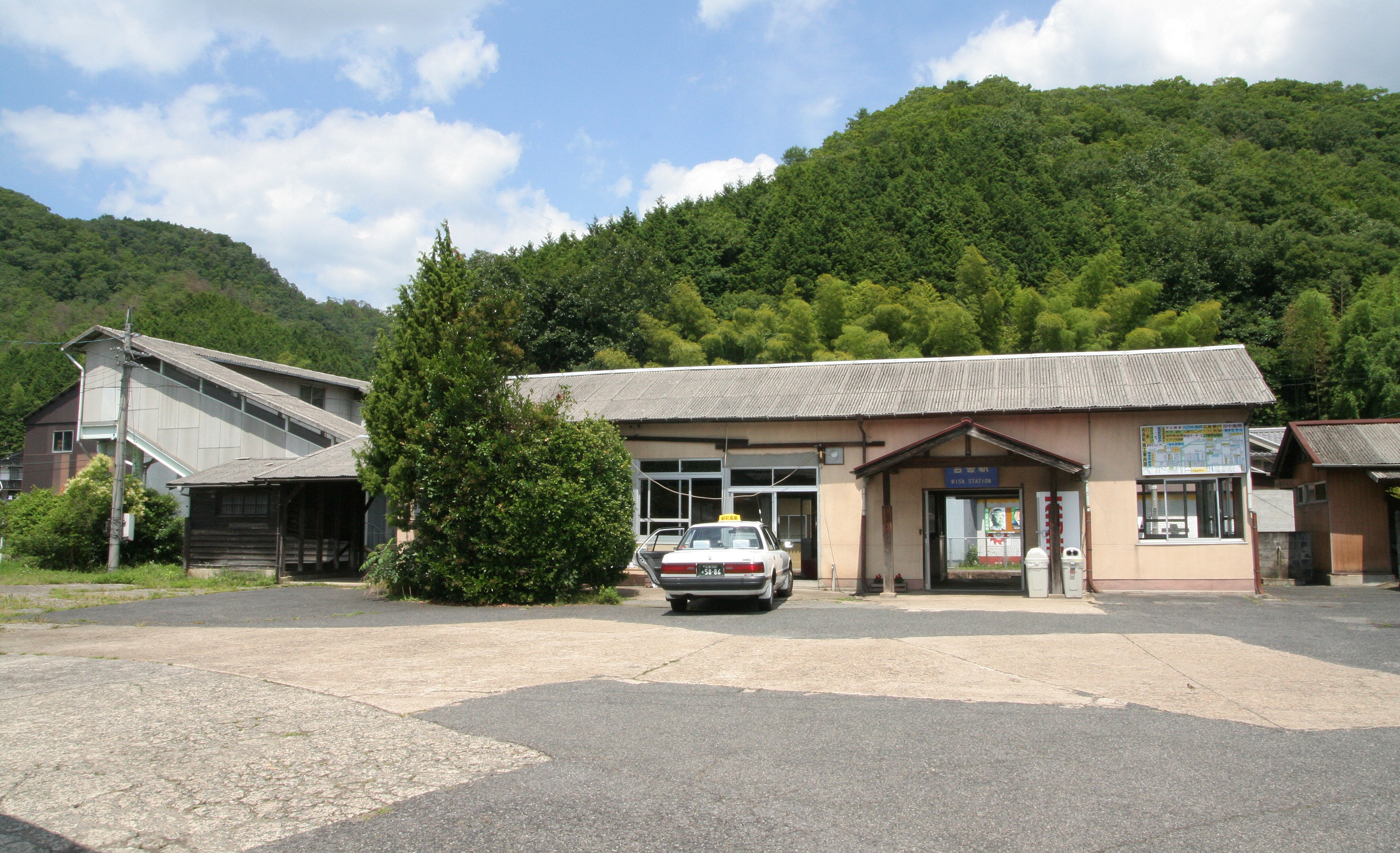
- Kisa Station, July 2008

General information
- Location: 677-3 Mitama Kisa-chō, Miyoshi-shi, Hiroshima-ken 729-4204; Japan
- Coordinates: 34°43′39.46″N 132°59′26.78″E
- Owner: West Japan Railway Company
- Operator: West Japan Railway Company
- Line: Z Fukuen Line
- Distance: 67.3 km (41.8 miles) from Fukuyama
- Platforms: 2 side platforms
- Tracks: 2
- Connections: Bus stop

Construction
- Structure type: Ground level
- Accessible: Yes

Other information
- Status: Unstaffed
- Website: Official website

History
- Opened: 15 November 1933

Passengers
- FY2019: 133

Services
Preceding station	JR West	Following station
Mirasaka towards Miyoshi	Fukuen Line Local	Bingo-Yasuda towards Fukuyama
Location
- Location within Hiroshima Prefecture Location within Japan

Kisa Station (吉舎駅, Kisa-eki-eki) is a passenger railway station located in the city of Miyoshi, Hiroshima Prefecture, Japan. It is operated by the West Japan Railway Company (JR West).

== Lines ==
Kisa Station is served by the JR West Fukuen Line, and is located 67.3 kilometers from the terminus of the line at Fukuyama.

== Station layout ==
The station consists of two ground-level opposed side platforms connected to the wooden station building by a footbridge. The station is unattended.

=== Platforms ===
1	■ Z Fukuen Line	for Fuchū and Fukuyama
2	■ Z Fukuen Line	for Miyoshi

== History ==
Kisa Station was opened on 15 November 1933. With the privatization of the Japanese National Railways (JNR) on 1 April 1987, the station came under the control of JR West.

== Passenger statistics ==
In fiscal 2019, the station was used by an average of 133 passengers daily.

== Surrounding area ==
- Japan National Route 184
- Miyoshi City Hall Kisa Branch
- Hiroshima Prefectural Nisshokan High School
- Miyoshi Municipal Kisa Junior High School
- Miyoshi Municipal Kisa Elementary School
- Kisa Museum of History and Folklore

== See also ==
- List of railway stations in Japan
