= Shin-ichi Station =

Railway station in Fukuyama, Hiroshima Prefecture, Japan

Shin-ichi Station 新市駅
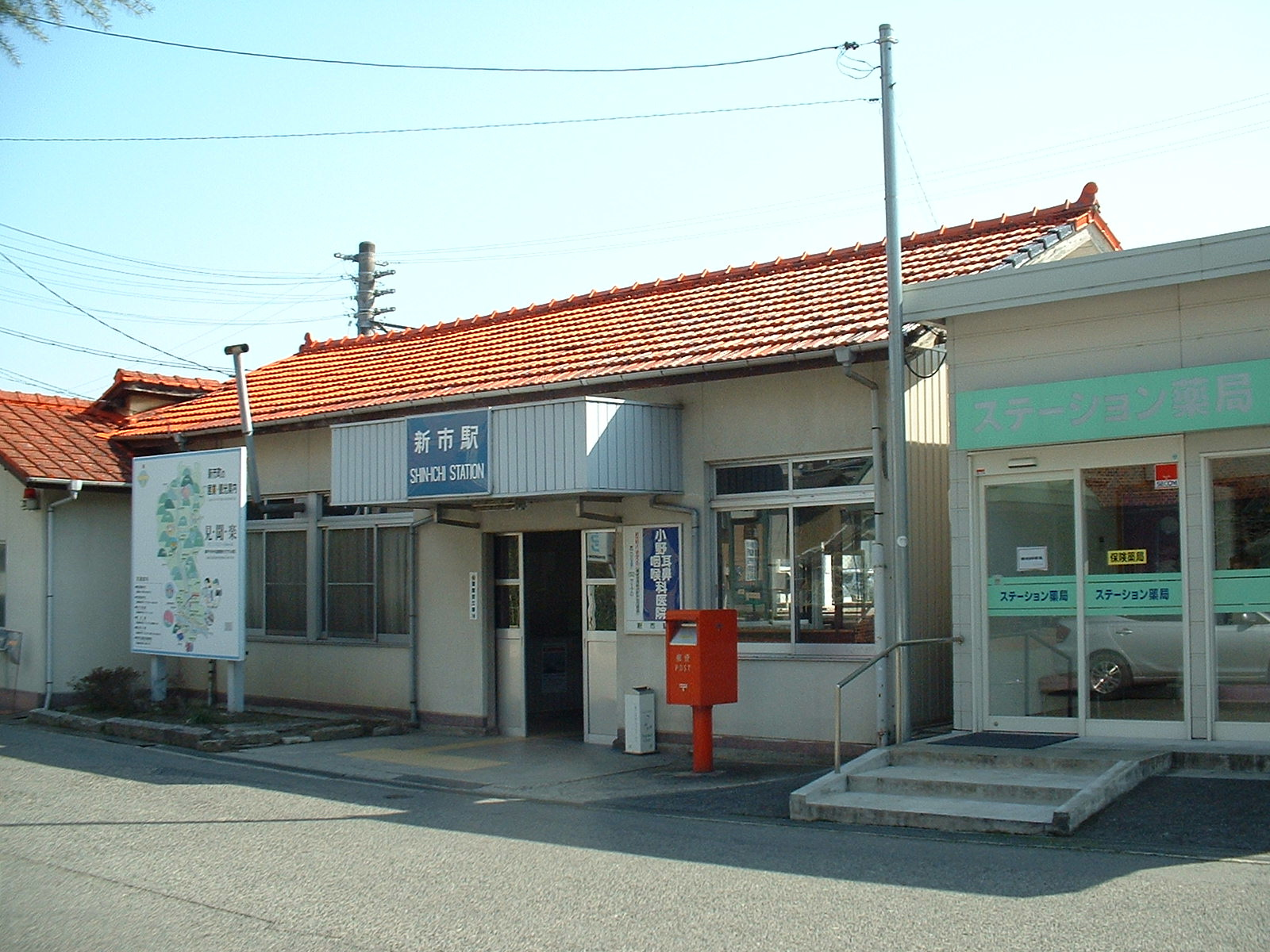
- Shin-ichi Station, March 2006

General information
- Location: 513-2 Shin'ichi Shin'ichi-chō, Fukuyama-shi, Hiroshima-ken 729-3103; Japan
- Coordinates: 34°33′15.92″N 133°16′10.25″E
- Owner: West Japan Railway Company
- Operator: West Japan Railway Company
- Line: Z Fukuen Line
- Distance: 20.0 km (12.4 miles) from Fukuyama
- Platforms: 2 side platforms
- Tracks: 2
- Connections: Bus stop

Construction
- Structure type: Ground level
- Accessible: Yes

Other information
- Status: Unstaffed
- Website: Official website

History
- Opened: 21 July 1914

Services
Preceding station	JR West	Following station
Takagi towards Miyoshi	Fukuen Line Local	Kamitode towards Fukuyama
Location
- Location within Hiroshima Prefecture Location within Japan

Shin-ichi Station (新市駅, Shin-ichi-eki) is a passenger railway station located in the city of Fukuyama, Hiroshima Prefecture, Japan. It is operated by the West Japan Railway Company (JR West).

== Lines ==
Shin-ichi Station is served by the JR West Fukuen Line, and is located 20.0 kilometers from the terminus of the line at Fukuyama.

== Station layout ==
The station consists of two unnumbered ground-level side platforms connected to the station building by a footbridge. The station is unattended.

=== Platforms ===
1	■ Z Fukuen Line	for Fukuyama
2	■ Z Fukuen Line	for Fuchū and Miyoshi

== History ==
Shin-ichi Station was opened on 21 July 1914. With the privatization of the Japanese National Railways (JNR) on 1 April 1987, the station came under the control of JR West.

== Surrounding area ==
- Fukuyama City Shin'ichi Branch
- Fukuyama Municipal Shinichi Elementary School
- Ashida River
- Kibitsu jinja (ichinomiya of Bingo Province)

== See also ==
- List of railway stations in Japan
