= Ukai Station =

Railway station in Fuchū, Hiroshima Prefecture, Japan

Ukai Station 鵜飼駅
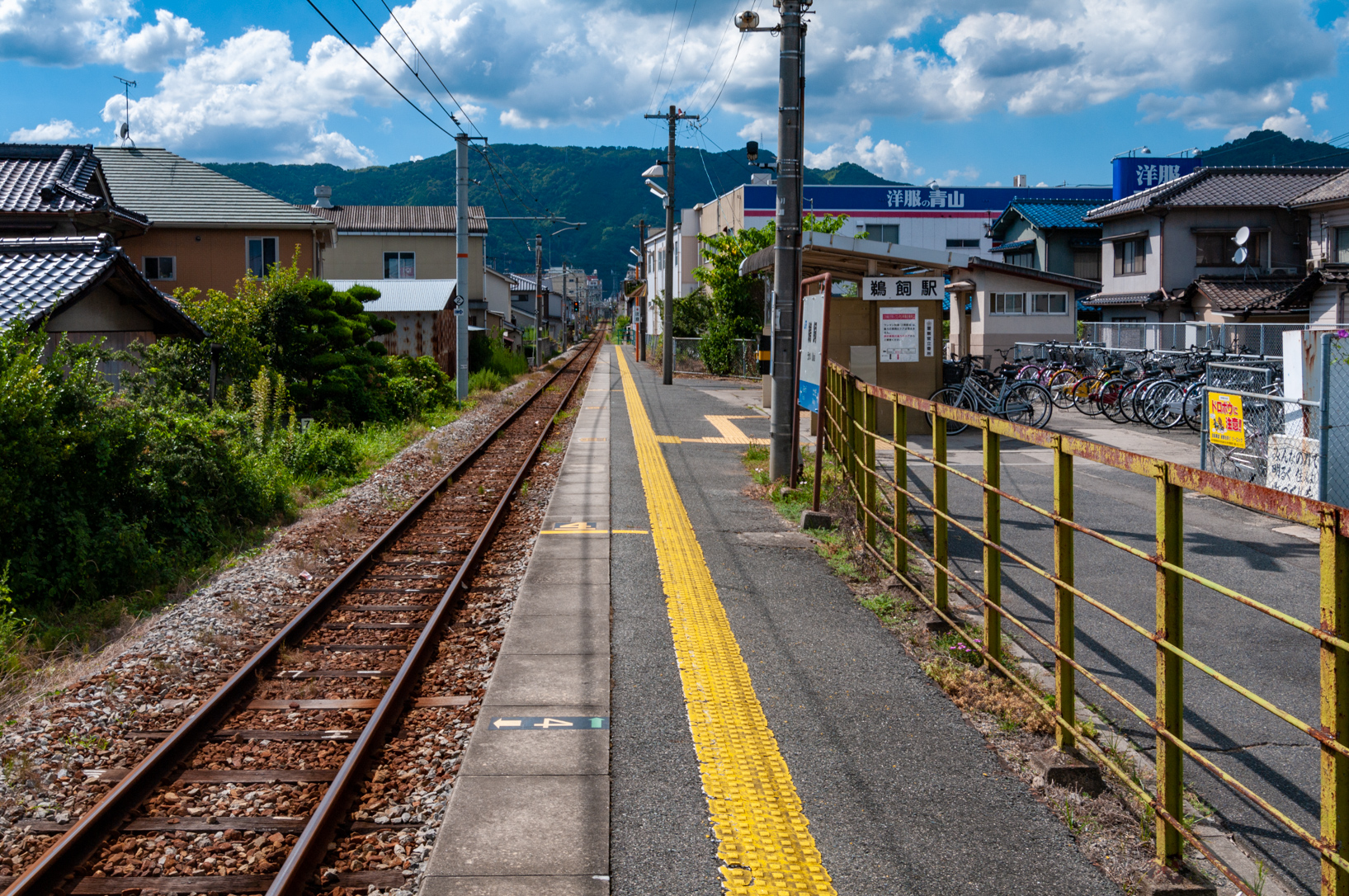
- Ukai Station, August 2008

General information
- Location: 45-10 Ukai-chō, Fuchū-shi, Hiroshima-ken 726-0002; Japan
- Coordinates: 34°34′4.36″N 133°14′40.85″E
- Owner: West Japan Railway Company
- Operator: West Japan Railway Company
- Line: Z Fukuen Line
- Distance: 22.7 km (14.1 miles) from Fukuyama
- Platforms: 1 side platform
- Tracks: 1
- Connections: Bus stop

Construction
- Accessible: Yes

Other information
- Status: Unstaffed
- Website: Official website

History
- Opened: 21 July 1914

Passengers
- FY2019: 327

Services
Preceding station	JR West	Following station
Fuchū towards Miyoshi	Fukuen Line Local	Takagi towards Fukuyama
Location
- Location within Hiroshima Prefecture Location within Japan

Ukai Station (鵜飼駅, Ukai-eki) is a passenger railway station located in the city of Fuchū, Hiroshima Prefecture, Japan. It is operated by the West Japan Railway Company (JR West).

== Lines ==
Ukai Station is served by the JR West Fukuen Line, and is located 22.7 kilometers from the terminus of the line at Fukuyama.

== Station layout ==
The station consists of one side platform serving a single-bi-directional track. These is no station building and the station is unattended. An automatic ticket vending machine is installed in the waiting area on the platform.

== History ==
Ukai Station was opened on 21 July 1914 as the Ukai Stop (鵜飼停留場, Ukai teiryūb). It was elevated to a full station on 12 January 1923. With the privatization of the Japanese National Railways (JNR) on 1 April 1987, the station came under the control of JR West.

== Passenger statistics ==
In fiscal 2019, the station was used by an average of 327 passengers daily.

== Surrounding area ==
- Hiroshima Prefectural Fuchu Police Station
- Fuchu Summary Court
- Fuchu Tax Office
- Fuchu Labor Standards Inspection Office
- Fuchu Municipal Hospital

== See also ==
- List of railway stations in Japan
