= Yudamura Station =

Railway station in Fukuyama, Hiroshima Prefecture, Japan

Yudamura Station 湯田村駅
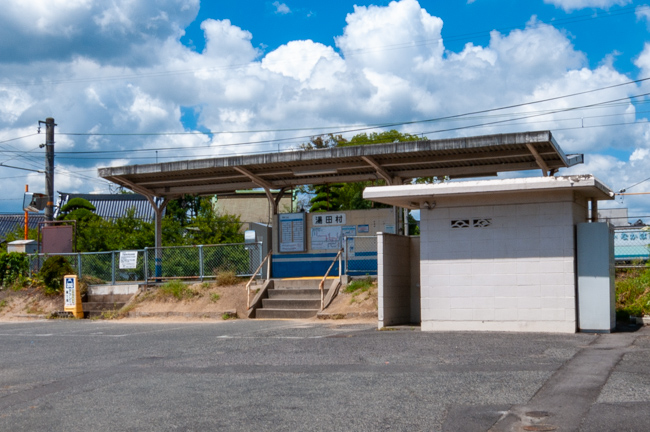
- Yudamura Station, August 2010

General information
- Location: 770-3 Tokuda, Kannabe-chō, Fukuyama-shi, Hiroshima-ken 720-2126; Japan
- Coordinates: 34°33′7″N 133°22′15.57″E
- Owner: West Japan Railway Company
- Operator: West Japan Railway Company
- Line: Z Fukuen Line
- Distance: 10.4 km (6.5 miles) from Fukuyama
- Platforms: 1 side platform
- Tracks: 1
- Connections: Bus stop

Construction
- Structure type: Ground level
- Accessible: Yes

Other information
- Status: Unstaffed
- Website: Official website

History
- Opened: 21 July 1914

Passengers
- FY2019: 842 daily

Services
| Preceding station | JR West | Following station |
|---|---|---|
| Michinoue towards Miyoshi | Fukuen Line Local | Kannabe towards Fukuyama |
Location
- Location within Hiroshima Prefecture Location within Japan

Yudamura Station (湯田村駅, Yudamura-eki) is a passenger railway station located in the city of Fukuyama, Hiroshima Prefecture, Japan. It is operated by the West Japan Railway Company (JR West).

== Lines ==
Yudamura Station is served by the JR West Fukuen Line, and is located 10.4 kilometers from the terminus of the line at Fukuyama.

== Station layout ==
The station consists of one side platform serving a single bi-directional track. There is no station building, but only a large weather shelter. The station is unattended.

== History ==
Yudamura Station was opened on 21 July 1914 as the Yudamura Stop (湯田村停留所, Yudamura teiryūjo). It was upgraded to a full passenger station on 1 September 1933. With the privatization of the Japanese National Railways (JNR) on 1 April 1987, the station came under the control of JR West.

== Passenger statistics ==
In fiscal 2019, the station was used by an average of 842 passengers daily.

== Surrounding area ==
- Hiroshima Prefectural Kanbe Asahi High School
- Fukuyama City Kannabe Nishi Junior High School
- Fukuyama Municipal Yuda Elementary School
- Fukuyama City Kannabe Civic Exchange Center (Fukuyama City Hall Kannabe Branch)
- Japan National Route 486

== See also ==
- List of railway stations in Japan
