= Makoto Izumitani =

Japanese drummer

- Origin: Fukuyama, Hiroshima, Hiroshima Prefecture, Japan
- Genres: Pop, Rock, R&B, Jazz, Country music, Hip Hop
- Occupation(s): Session musician, Drummer
- Years active: 1991 – Present

Makoto Izumitani (born August 28, 1972 in Fukuyama, Hiroshima, Japan) is a drummer.

== Performances ==
He performed at the 47th Grammy Awards at Staples Center, BRIT Awards at Earls Court Exhibition Centre, American Music Award at Shrine Auditorium, MTV Europe Music Awards 2004 in Rome Italy, Billboard Music Award at MGM Grand Las Vegas, as well as on Saturday Night Live, Late Night with David Letterman, Good Morning America, and Jimmy Kimmel Live!.

He has performed live concerts at Madison Square Garden, Universal Amphitheatre, Angel Stadium, Arrowhead Pond, and London Coliseum.

He has performed with Gwen Stefani, Eve, Missing Persons, Rickie Lee Jones, Michael Landau, John Beasley, Jimmy Johnson, Dawayne Bailey, Louis Johnson.

== Records ==
In 2004, Izumitani played drums on the International deluxe/limited edition of Gwen Stefani's album Love.Angel.Music.Baby. He played two tracks "What You Waiting For? (Live)" & "Harajuku Girls (Live)" on this album. These tracks were originally recorded by Guy Charbonneau on Le Mobile for live from LAUNCH.com. In late 2007, Izumitani played drums on the studio version of Japanese pop-star Ayumi Hamasaki's 43rd single Together When... with bass player Chris Chaney. This song not only debuted at number one with over 3 million downloads, but also claimed the top position on the monthly download charts. In 2008 the album Guilty (Ayumi Hamasaki album) including Together When... sold over 1,800,000 units worldwide.

== Gear ==
He plays Gretsch Drums, Avedis Zildjian Company, Remo, Vater Percussion.
