= Bingo-Honjō Station =

Railway station in Fukuyama, Hiroshima Prefecture, Japan

Bingo-Honjō Station 備後本庄駅
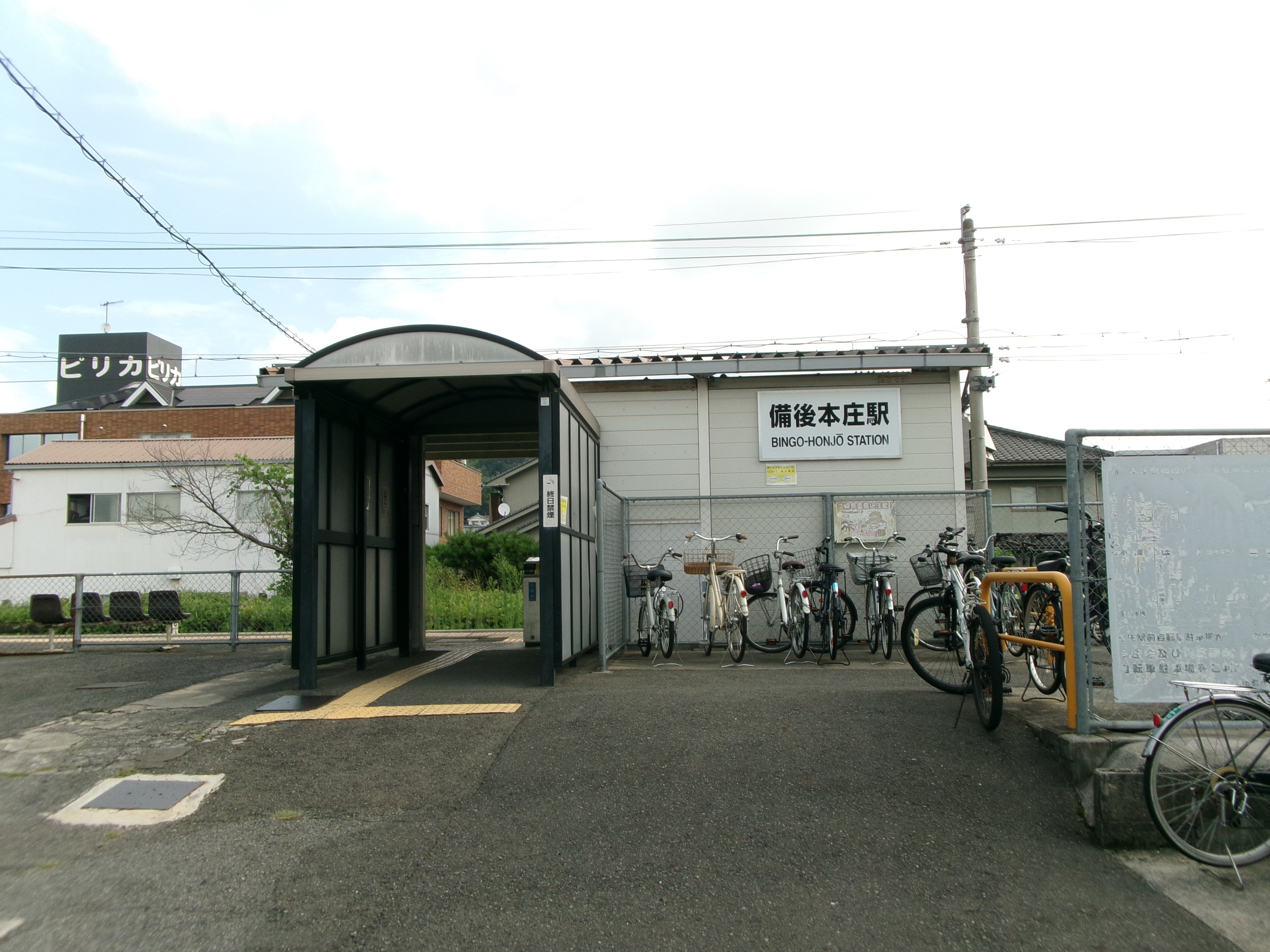
- Bingo-Honjō Station

General information
- Location: 3-chōme-30 Honjōchōnaka, Fukuyama-shi, Hiroshima-ken 720-0076; Japan
- Coordinates: 34°29′35.93″N 133°20′42.34″E
- Owner: West Japan Railway Company
- Operator: West Japan Railway Company
- Line: Z Fukuen Line
- Distance: 1.8 km (1.1 miles) from Fukuyama
- Platforms: 1 side platform
- Tracks: 1
- Connections: Bus stop

Construction
- Structure type: Ground level
- Accessible: Yes

Other information
- Status: Unstaffed
- Website: Official website

History
- Opened: 1 February 1940

Passengers
- FY2019: 435 daily

Services
Preceding station	JR West	Following station
Yokoo towards Miyoshi	Fukuen Line Local	Fukuyama Terminus
Location
- Location within Hiroshima Prefecture Location within Japan

Bingo-Honjō Station (備後本庄駅, Bingo-Honjō-eki) is a passenger railway station located in the city of Fukuyama, Hiroshima Prefecture, Japan. It is operated by the West Japan Railway Company (JR West).

== Lines ==
Bingo-Honjō Station is served by the JR West Fukuen Line, and is located 1.8 kilometers from the terminus of the line at Fukuyama.

== Station layout ==
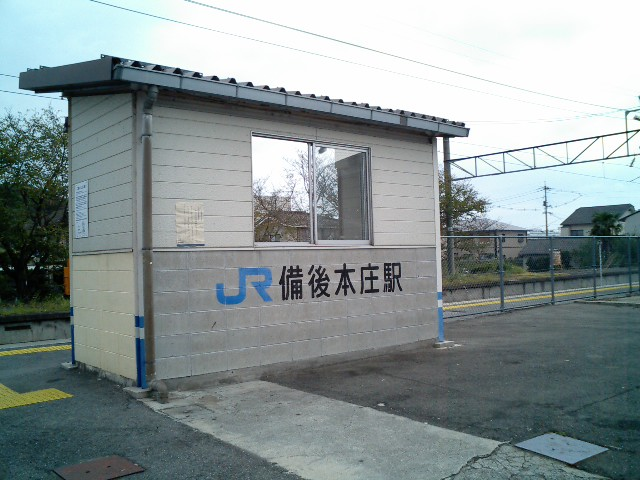
The old station building before the introduction of ICOCA (October 2005)

The station consists of one side platform serving a single bi-directional track. It was originally built with two opposed side platforms; now sakura trees have been planted on the platform no longer in use. The station is unattended.

== History ==
Bingo-Honjō Station was opened on 1 February 1940. With the privatization of the Japanese National Railways (JNR) on 1 April 1987, the station came under the control of JR West.

== Passenger statistics ==
In fiscal 2019, the station was used by an average of 435 passengers daily.

== Surrounding area ==
- Fukuyama City University Kitahonjo Campus

== See also ==
- List of railway stations in Japan
