= Fukuen Line =

Railway line in Hiroshima prefecture, Japan

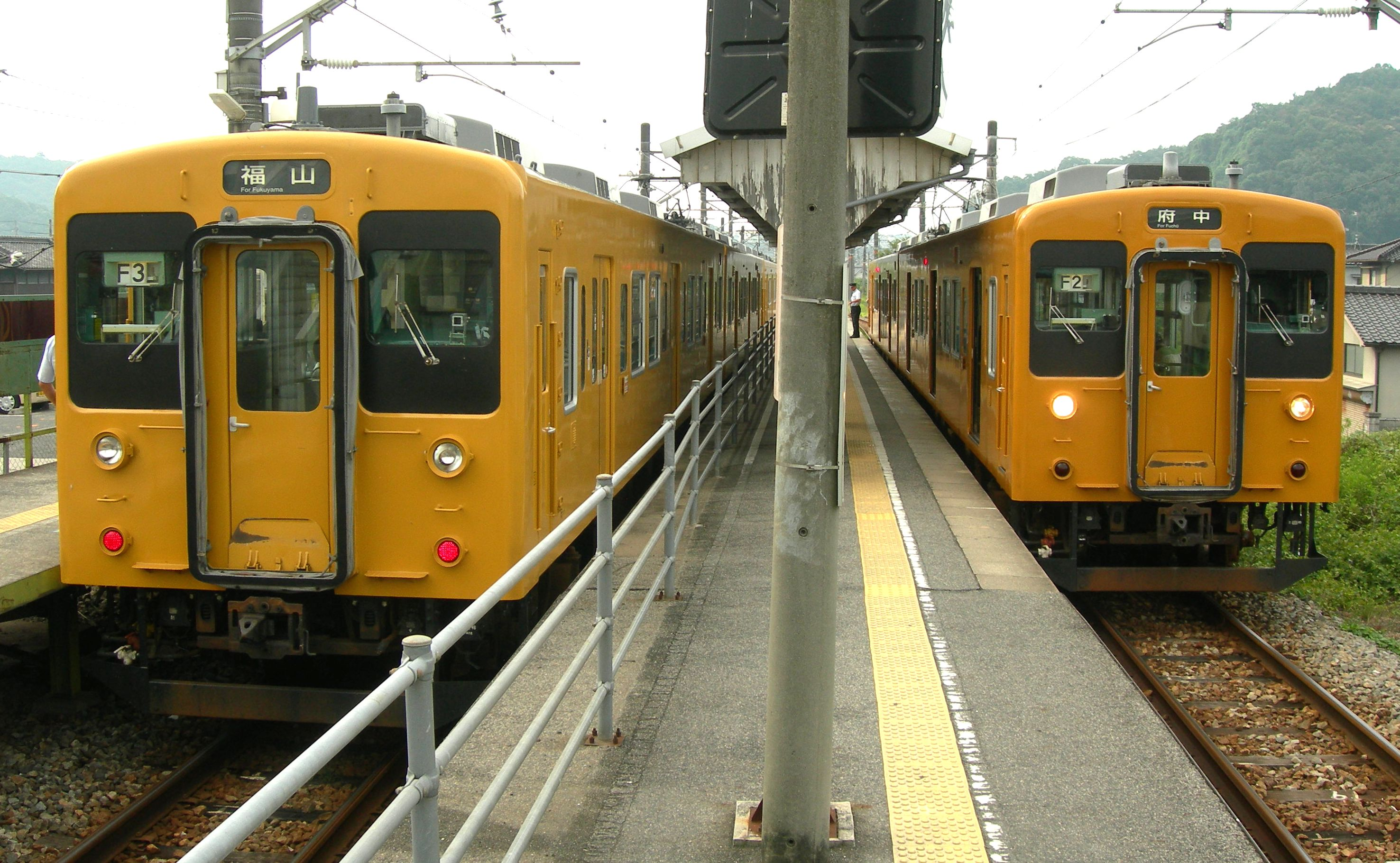
- 105 series EMUs at Yokoo Station, July 2011

Overview
- Native name: 福塩線
- Owner: JR West
- Locale: Hiroshima Prefecture
- Termini: Fukuyama; Shiomachi
- Stations: 27

Service
- Type: Heavy rail
- Operator(s): JR West

History
- Opened: July 21, 1914; 111 years ago

Technical
- Line length: 78.0 km (48.5 mi)
- Track gauge: 1,067 mm (3 ft 6 in)
- Electrification: 1,500 V DC, overhead lines (Fukuyama–Fuchū)

The Fukuen Line (福塩線, Fukuen-sen) is a railway line in Hiroshima Prefecture, Japan, operated by the West Japan Railway Company (JR West). It connects Fukuyama Station in Fukuyama to Miyoshi Station in Miyoshi.

== Stations ==
Line	Name		Distance (km)	Transfers	Location	
Fukuen Line	Fukuyama	福山	0.0	Sanyō Shinkansen; Sanyō Main Line	Fukuyama	Hiroshima
Fukuen Line	Bingo-Honjō	備後本庄	1.8		Fukuyama	Hiroshima
Fukuen Line	Yokoo	横尾	6.1		Fukuyama	Hiroshima
Fukuen Line	Kannabe	神辺	8.4	Ibara Railway Ibara Line	Fukuyama	Hiroshima
Fukuen Line	Yudamura	湯田村	10.4		Fukuyama	Hiroshima
Fukuen Line	Michinoue	道上	11.3		Fukuyama	Hiroshima
Fukuen Line	Managura	万能倉	13.4		Fukuyama	Hiroshima
Fukuen Line	Ekiya	駅家	14.6		Fukuyama	Hiroshima
Fukuen Line	Chikata	近田	16.0		Fukuyama	Hiroshima
Fukuen Line	Tode	戸手	17.0		Fukuyama	Hiroshima
Fukuen Line	Kamitode	上戸手	18.8		Fukuyama	Hiroshima
Fukuen Line	Shin-ichi	新市	20.0		Fukuyama	Hiroshima
Fukuen Line	Takagi	高木	21.7		Fuchū	Hiroshima
Fukuen Line	Ukai	鵜飼	22.7		Fuchū	Hiroshima
Fukuen Line	Fuchū	府中	23.6		Fuchū	Hiroshima
Fukuen Line	Shimo-Kawabe	下川辺	27.9		Fuchū	Hiroshima
Fukuen Line	Nakahata	中畑	31.8		Fuchū	Hiroshima
Fukuen Line	Kawasa	河佐	34.9		Fuchū	Hiroshima
Fukuen Line	Bingo-Mikawa	備後三川	42.4		Sera, Sera	Hiroshima
Fukuen Line	Bingo-Yano	備後矢野	46.6		Fuchū	Hiroshima
Fukuen Line	Jōge	上下	50.3		Fuchū	Hiroshima
Fukuen Line	Kōnu	甲奴	54.7		Miyoshi	Hiroshima
Fukuen Line	Kajita	梶田	57.1		Miyoshi	Hiroshima
Fukuen Line	Bingo-Yasuda	備後安田	62.3		Miyoshi	Hiroshima
Fukuen Line	Kisa	吉舎	67.3		Miyoshi	Hiroshima
Fukuen Line	Mirasaka	三良坂	73.6		Miyoshi	Hiroshima
Fukuen Line	Shiomachi	塩町	78.0	Geibi Line	Miyoshi	Hiroshima
Geibi Line	Shiomachi	塩町	78.0	Geibi Line	Miyoshi	Hiroshima
Geibi Line	Kamisugi	神杉	79.5		Miyoshi	Hiroshima
Geibi Line	Yatsugi	八次	82.8		Miyoshi	Hiroshima
Geibi Line	Miyoshi	三次	85.1	Geibi Line	Miyoshi	Hiroshima

=== Former connecting lines ===
- Sankō Line (closed 1 April 2018) – Miyoshi Station

== Rolling stock ==
- 105 series 2-car EMUs (Fukuyama–Fuchū)
- KiHa 120-300 single-car DMUs (Fuchū–Miyoshi)

== History ==
The Ryobi Light Railway opened a 762 mm (2 ft 6 in) gauge line to Fuchu in 1914, and electrified it at 750 V DC in 1927. The company was nationalised in 1933, the same year the Japanese Government Railway opened the Shiomachi to Kisa section of the line (then as an extension of the Geibi Line). The Fukuyama to Fuchu section was regauged to 1,067 mm (3 ft 6 in) in 1935, the year the Kisa to Joge section opened. The two sections were connected with the opening of the Fuchu to Joge section in 1938.

The Fuchu to Shimo-Kawabe section was electrified in 1954, and whilst the voltage on the Fukuyama to Fuchu section was increased to 1500 V DC in 1961, the Fuchu to Shimo-Kawabe electrification was decommissioned the following year.

Freight services ceased in 1986, and in 1989, the 6,123 m Hattabara Tunnel and associated deviation were commissioned, shortening the route by 1.4 km.

Wanman driver only operation commenced on the non-electrified section between Fuchū and Miyoshi on 1 April 1991, using KiHa 120-300 DMUs. Driver-only operation commenced on the electrified section between Fukuyama and Fuchū on 14 March 1992, using 105 series EMUs.
