= Fukuyama Heisei University =

Coordinates: 34°32′58″N 133°20′52″E

- 福山平成大学
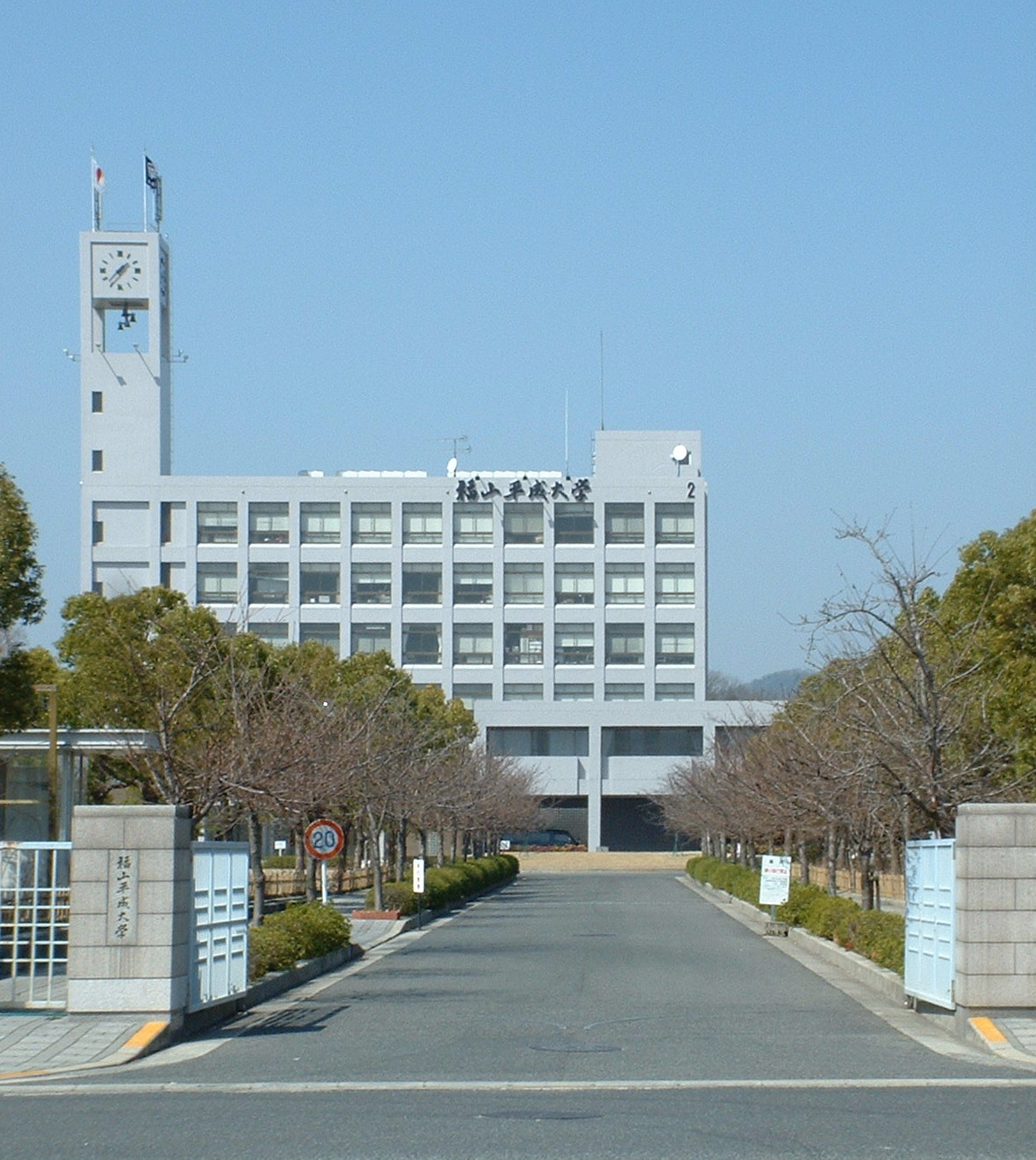
- Fukuyama Heisei University
- Type: Private
- Established: 1994
- Location: Fukuyama, Hiroshima, Japan
- Website: www.heisei-u.ac.jp

Fukuyama Heisei University (福山平成大学, Fukuyama heisei daigaku) is a private university in Fukuyama, Hiroshima, Japan, established in 1994.

In 2024 the university had over 1100 students and offered undergraduate and postgraduate courses in Business, Health and Nursing.

In 2025, the university was rated as the 571st best in Japan.
