= Fukuyama, Hiroshima =

Fukuyama 福山
- Core city
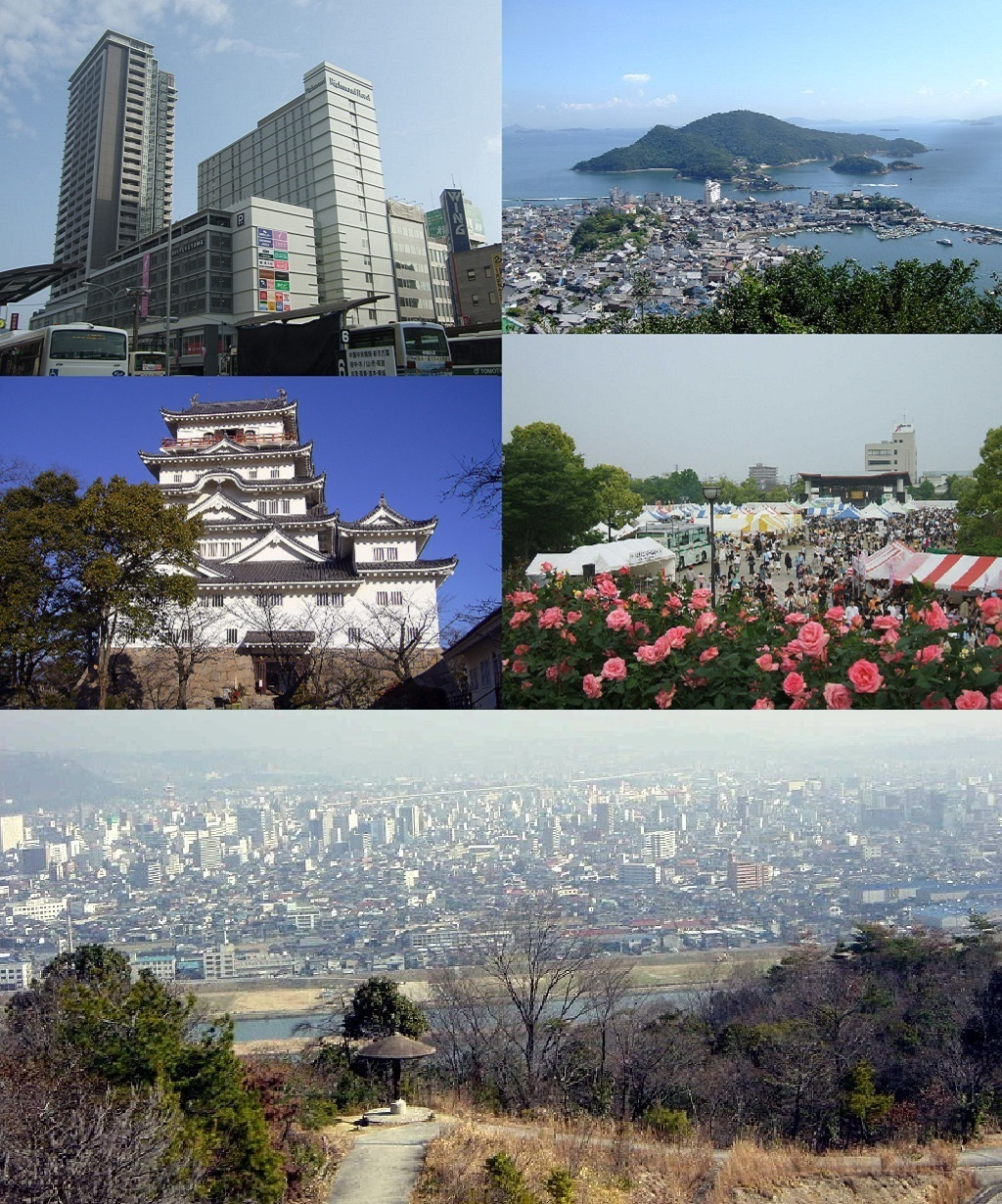
INES Fukuyama	Tomonoura
Fukuyama Castle	Fukuyama Rose Festival
Fukuyama city distant view
- Flag Emblem
- Interactive map of Fukuyama
- Location in Japan
- Coordinates: 34°29′09″N 133°21′44″E
- Country: Japan
- Region: Chūgoku (San'yō)
- Prefecture: Hiroshima

Government
  - Mayor: Naoki Edahiro

Area
  - Total: 518.14 km^{2} (200.05 sq mi)

Population (March 31, 2023)
  - Total: 459,160
  - Density: 886.17/km^{2} (2,295.2/sq mi)
- Time zone: UTC+09:00 (JST)
- City hall address: 3-5 Higashi-Sakura-cho, Fukuyama-shi, Hiroshima-ken 720-8501
- Climate: Cfa
- Website: Official website
- Symbols
- Flower: Rose, Chrysanthemum
- Mammal: Bat
- Tree: Chinaberry tree, Mokusei Kusunoki

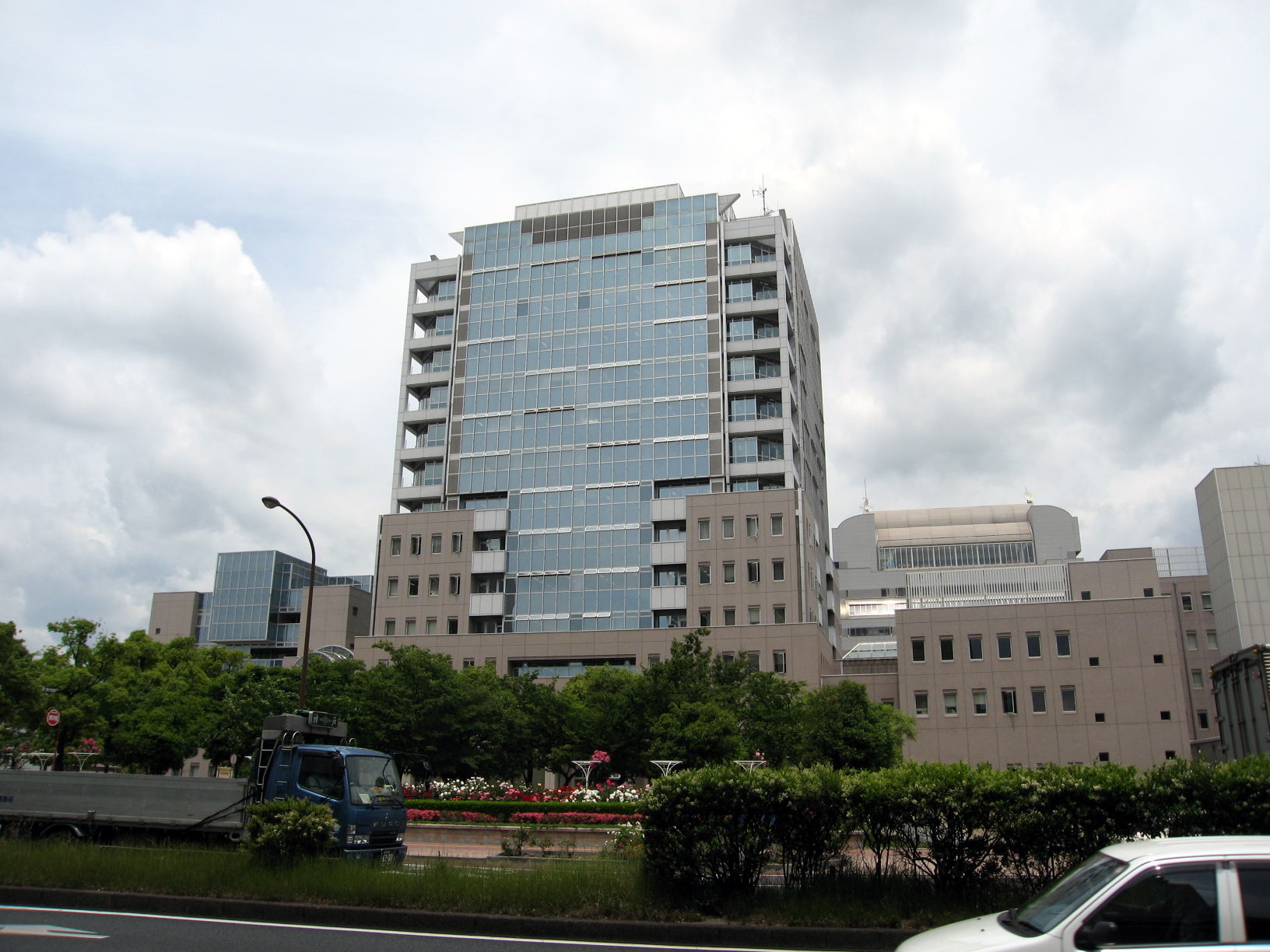
Fukuyama City Hall

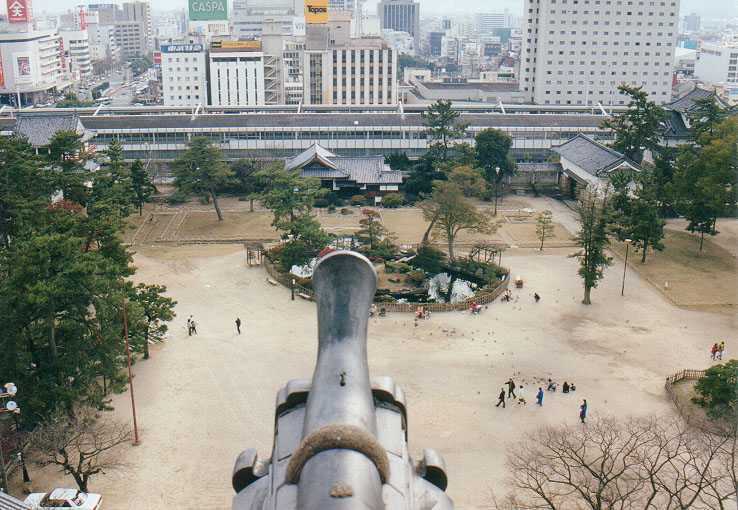
City view from Fukuyama Castle

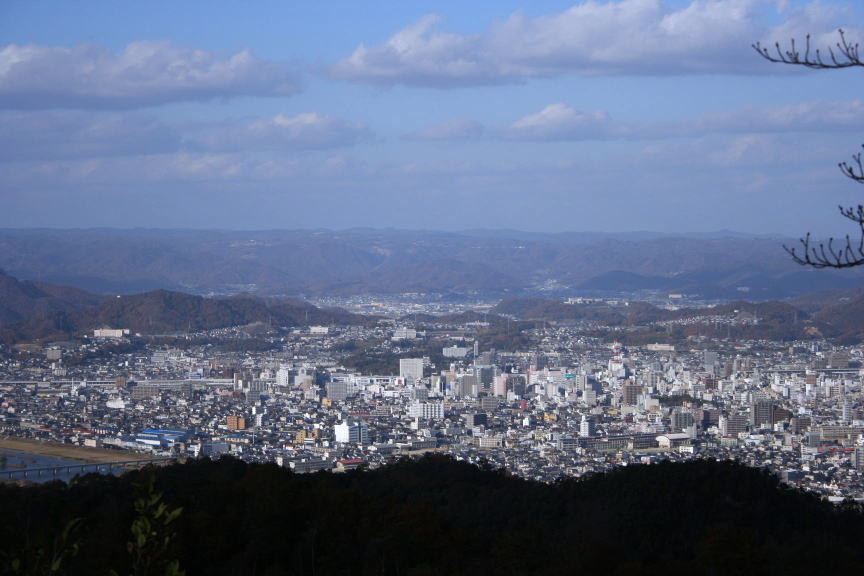
Panorama of Fukuyama

Fukuyama (Japanese: 福山, romanized: Fukuyama) is a city in Hiroshima Prefecture, Japan. As of 31 March 2023, the city had an estimated population of 459,160 in 214259 households and a population density of 890 persons per km^{2}. The total area of the city is 518.14 square kilometres (200.05 sq mi). After Hiroshima, it is the largest city in Hiroshima Prefecture. The city's symbol is the rose and it holds an annual Rose Festival in the month of May. The official mascot of Fukuyama is an anthropomorphic rose child by the name of Rola.

== Geography ==
Fukuyama City is located in southeastern Hiroshima Prefecture. The center of the city is located in the Fukuyama Plain, which has been built by land reclamation projects since the Edo period, and the delta area that spreads out at the mouth of the Ashida River, which flows north and south through the city. The southern end of the city faces the Seto Inland Sea, and the northern mountainous area, which is the southern end of the so-called 'Jinseki Plateau', at the southwestern end of the Kibi Plateau with an elevation of 400 to 500 meters in connected to the Chugoku Mountains. The highest peak in the city is Mt. Kyonoue at 611 meters above sea level. This is the basin of the Oda River, a tributary of the Takahashi River that flows into Kurashiki, Okayama. The urban area is roughly divided into the former Fukuyama city, the eastern (Zao, Kasuga) district, the southern (Tomo, Numakuma) district, the Matsunaga (former Matsunaga City) district, and the northern (Kannabe, Ekiya, Kamo) districts. Fukuyama expanded by incorporated neighboring municipalities one after another, but because the eastern part was blocked by the prefectural border and the southern part by the sea, the city limits expanded to the north and west.

=== Neighboring municipalities ===
Hiroshima Prefecture

- Jinsekikōgen
- Fuchū
- Onomichi

Okayama Prefecture

- Ibara
- Kasaoka

=== Climate ===
Fukuyama has a humid subtropical climate (Köppen climate classification Cfa) with very warm summers and cool winters. Precipitation is significant throughout the year, but is somewhat lower in winter.

Climate data for Fukuyama (1991−2020 normals, extremes 1942−present)
Month	Jan	Feb	Mar	Apr	May	Jun	Jul	Aug	Sep	Oct	Nov	Dec	Year
Record high °C (°F)	17.4 (63.3)	23.6 (74.5)	24.7 (76.5)	28.6 (83.5)	32.4 (90.3)	34.7 (94.5)	38.2 (100.8)	38.5 (101.3)	36.7 (98.1)	32.2 (90.0)	27.1 (80.8)	21.4 (70.5)	38.5 (101.3)
Mean maximum °C (°F)	14.5 (58.1)	16.8 (62.2)	20.5 (68.9)	25.3 (77.5)	29.2 (84.6)	31.8 (89.2)	35.1 (95.2)	36.0 (96.8)	33.6 (92.5)	28.6 (83.5)	22.6 (72.7)	17.1 (62.8)	36.2 (97.2)
Mean daily maximum °C (°F)	9.8 (49.6)	10.5 (50.9)	13.9 (57.0)	19.2 (66.6)	24.0 (75.2)	27.0 (80.6)	30.9 (87.6)	32.8 (91.0)	28.8 (83.8)	23.3 (73.9)	17.5 (63.5)	12.1 (53.8)	20.8 (69.5)
Daily mean °C (°F)	4.6 (40.3)	5.2 (41.4)	8.5 (47.3)	13.7 (56.7)	18.7 (65.7)	22.5 (72.5)	26.6 (79.9)	27.9 (82.2)	24.0 (75.2)	18.0 (64.4)	12.0 (53.6)	6.8 (44.2)	15.7 (60.3)
Mean daily minimum °C (°F)	0.0 (32.0)	0.4 (32.7)	3.2 (37.8)	8.1 (46.6)	13.3 (55.9)	18.5 (65.3)	22.9 (73.2)	23.9 (75.0)	19.9 (67.8)	13.3 (55.9)	7.1 (44.8)	2.1 (35.8)	11.1 (51.9)
Mean minimum °C (°F)	−4.1 (24.6)	−3.9 (25.0)	−2.0 (28.4)	1.2 (34.2)	7.3 (45.1)	13.3 (55.9)	19.2 (66.6)	20.1 (68.2)	13.8 (56.8)	7.0 (44.6)	1.2 (34.2)	−3.1 (26.4)	−4.7 (23.5)
Record low °C (°F)	−8.1 (17.4)	−9.2 (15.4)	−5.9 (21.4)	−1.8 (28.8)	2.8 (37.0)	8.0 (46.4)	13.2 (55.8)	15.8 (60.4)	8.0 (46.4)	1.5 (34.7)	−2.4 (27.7)	−6.7 (19.9)	−9.2 (15.4)
Average precipitation mm (inches)	38.5 (1.52)	47.0 (1.85)	83.7 (3.30)	91.6 (3.61)	117.7 (4.63)	174.5 (6.87)	198.0 (7.80)	95.2 (3.75)	136.0 (5.35)	91.1 (3.59)	55.1 (2.17)	43.3 (1.70)	1,171.7 (46.13)
Average snowfall cm (inches)	trace	3 (1.2)	trace	0 (0)	0 (0)	0 (0)	0 (0)	0 (0)	0 (0)	0 (0)	0 (0)	trace	4 (1.6)
Average precipitation days (≥ 1.0 mm)	4.7	6.5	9.0	8.8	8.5	10.5	9.6	6.4	8.1	6.5	5.6	5.4	89.6
Average snowy days (≥ 1 cm)	0.2	1.0	0.1	0	0	0	0	0	0	0	0	0.2	1.5
Average relative humidity (%)	69	68	67	66	68	75	76	73	73	72	73	72	71
Mean monthly sunshine hours	139.8	138.6	174.8	191.4	211.5	162.4	193.5	221.8	165.6	174.3	150.7	145.6	2,069.8
Source: Japan Meteorological Agency

=== Demographics ===
Per Japanese census data, the population of Fukuyama in 2020 is 460,930 people. Fukuyama has been conducting censuses since 1960.

Historical population
Year	Pop.	±%
1960	281,701	—
1965	301,376	+7.0%
1970	355,264	+17.9%
1975	405,677	+14.2%
1980	425,675	+4.9%
1985	441,502	+3.7%
1990	445,403	+0.9%
1995	453,791	+1.9%
2000	456,908	+0.7%
2005	459,087	+0.5%
2010	461,471	+0.5%
2015	464,811	+0.7%
2020	460,930	−0.8%
Fukuyama population statistics

== History ==
The Fukuyama area is part of ancient Bingo Province, but until large-scale land reclamation projects in the Edo Period, it was largely tidal flats or part of the sea. An exception was the Ekiya neighborhood of northern Fukuyama, which was a post station on the old Sanyōdō highway. In the Edo Period, Fukuyama Castle and its surrounding castle town was founded as a castle town in 1619 by Mizuno Katsunari, a cousin of Shōgun Tokugawa Ieyasu. Mizuno was given command of a territory consisting of southern Bingo Province and southwestern Bitchū Province. The Mizuno were later replaced by the Abe clan. Following the Meiji restoration, the town of Fukuyama was established on April 1, 1889, with the creation of the modern municipalities system.

Fukuyama Town became Fukuyama City on July 1, 1916. The population of the city at that time was 32,356. In 1933, ten villages from surrounding Fukayasu District were merged into Fukuyama. Two additional villages from Numakuma District were similarly merged in 1942. On August 8, 1945 (two days after the atomic-bombing of Hiroshima), 91 American B-29 bombers made an air raid on Fukuyama, destroying much of the city.

On March 31, 1954, several towns and villages in Kōrimatsu District merged to found the city of Matsunaga. Matsunaga City would eventually merge with Fukuyama City on May 1, 1966. Several towns and villages from the Fukayasu District merged into Fukuyama in 1956, and Fukayasu Town merged in 1962. On April 1, 1974, Ashida Town in Ashina District merged with Fukuyama, followed by Kamo Town, Fukayasu District and Ekiya Town, Ashina District on February 1, 1975,.

Fukuyama was promoted to core city status on April 1, 1998, with greater local autonomy.

Several other surrounding towns and districts subsequently merged with Fukuyama:

- February 3, 2003, Utsumi Town in Numakuma District and Shin'ichi Town in Ashina District, thereby dissolving Ashina District
- February 1, 2005 Numakuma Town, dissolving Numakuma District
- March 1, 2006 Kannabe Town in Fukayasu District, dissolving the district

== Government ==
Fukuyama has a mayor-council form of government with a directly elected mayor and a unicameral city council of 38 members. Fukuyama contributes ten members to the Hiroshima Prefectural Assembly.

In terms of national politics, Fukuyama is part of the Hiroshima 6th district of the lower house of the Diet of Japan. Prior to 2022, the city was part of Hiroshima 7th district.

== Economy ==
Fukuyama is a major center for heavy industry, notably steel. JFE Steel West Japan Works Fukuyama Area (former Nippon Kokan Fukuyama Works), which was completed in 1961, is not only the company's largest manufacturing base, but also the world's largest steelworks. Fukuyama is also a major manufacturing base for textiles, processed food, electronic equipment, pumps, cranes, machine inspection equipment, food trays, and rubber.

== Education ==
=== Colleges and universities ===
- Fukuyama City University
- Fukuyama Heisei University
- Fukuyama University, The university offers many courses of study, but is best known for its excellent pharmacology program.

=== Primary and secondary schools ===
Fukuyama has 74 public elementary schools, 34 public junior high schools and one public high school operated by the city government. The city has 13 public high schools operated by the Hiroshima Prefectural Board of Education and one by the national government. There are also the private elementary schools, five private junior high schools and seven private high schools. The prefecture also operates three special education schools for the disabled.

=== Other ===
The Holocaust Education Center in Fukuyama, inaugurated on June 17, 1995, is dedicated to the memory of 1.5 million children who were murdered in the Holocaust. It has the distinction of being the first institution in Japan devoted to Holocaust education.

== Transportation ==
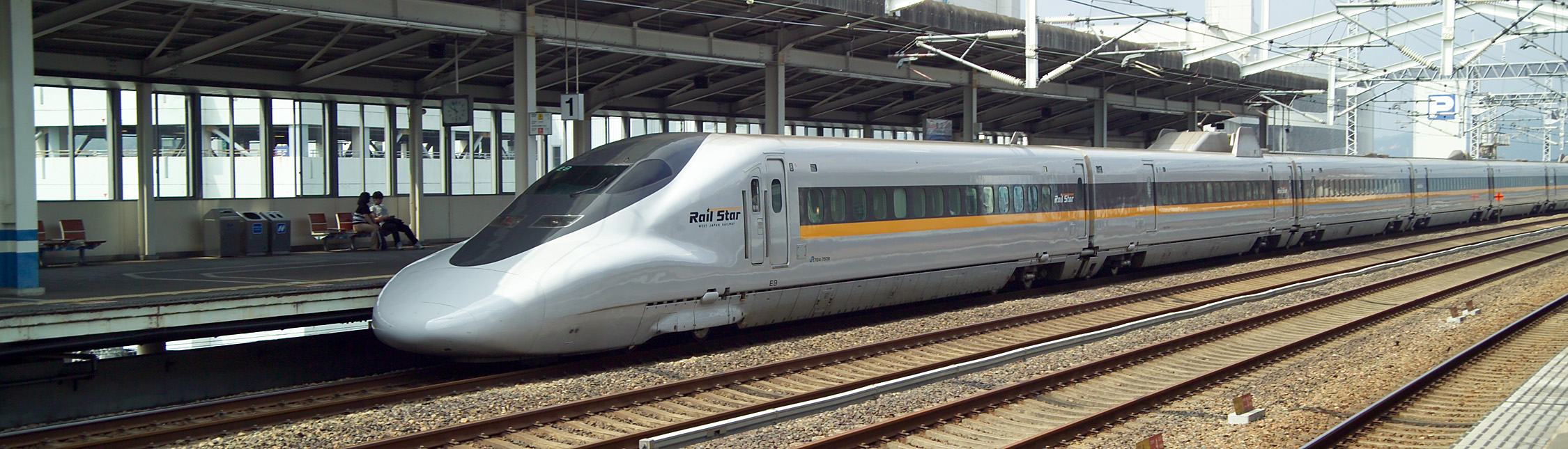
Fukuyama Station on the Sanyo Shinkansen

=== Railway ===
JR West – San'yō Shinkansen

- Fukuyama

JR West (JR West) - San'yō Main Line

- Daimon - Higashi-Fukuyama - Fukuyama - Bingo-Akasaka - Matsunaga

JR West (JR West) - Akō Line

- Fukuyama - Bingo-Honjō - Yokoo - Kannabe - Yudamura - Michinoue - Managura - Ekiya - Chikata - Tode - Kamitode - Shin-ichi

Ibara Railway Company

- Goryō - Yuno - Kannabe

=== Highways ===
- San'yō Expressway
- National Route 2
- National Route 182
- National Route 313
- National Route 314
- National Route 486

== Sister city relations ==
- Hamilton, Ontario, Canada
- Kazanlak, Bulgaria
- Maui, Hawaii, United States
- Okazaki, Aichi, Japan
- Pohang City, North Gyeongsang, South Korea
- Tacloban City, Philippines

== Local attractions ==
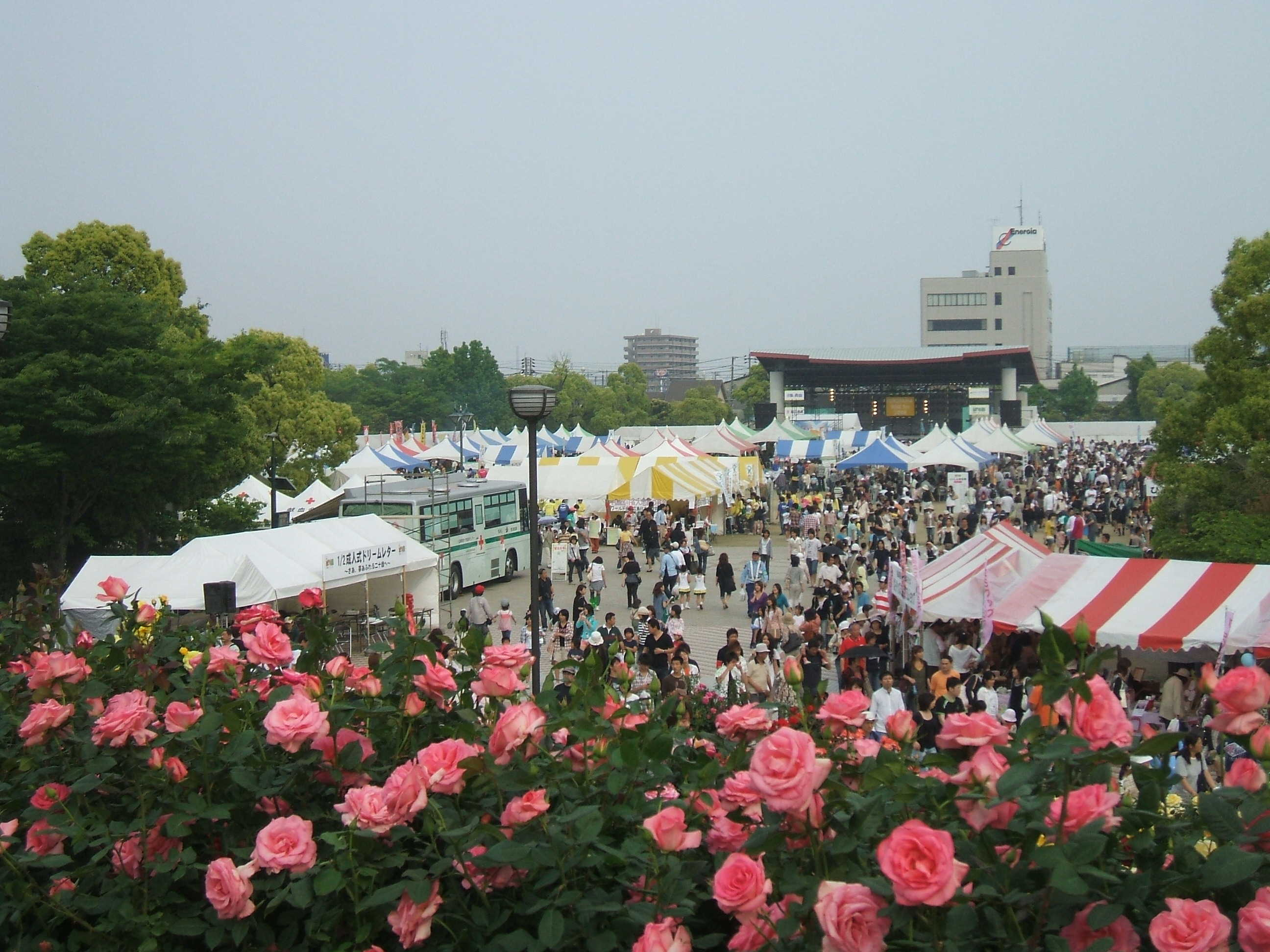
Fukuyama Rose Festival

- Fukuyama Castle
- Fukuyama Hachimangū Shinto shrine
- Kusado Sengen, a medieval town excavated in the Ashida River
- Myōōin - Buddhist temple with two national treasures.
- Taichōrō - temple hall on the hill behind the ferry terminal was built at the end of the 17th century to house a Korean delegation, which would at times pay its respects.
- Tomonoura - fishing port of numerous temples and shrines; approximately 30 minutes south of Fukuyama by bus (14 km from Fukuyama).
- Uono-sato - snack-food factory that processes most of the locally-caught fish. One can observe workers make chikuwa (ground-fish snacks) and senbei (rice crackers).

== Notable people from Fukuyama, Hiroshima ==
- Mana Endo, Japanese professional tennis player
- Anri Sugihara, Japanese gravure idol
- Jun Fukuyama, Japanese voice actor and singer (Code Geass, Love, Chunibyo & Other Delusions, Persona 5, Osomatsu-san, Assassination Classroom, Working!!, K, Oresuki and Jewelpet)
- Hirotaka Egusa, Nippon Professional Baseball pitcher
- Soji Shimada, Japanese mystery writer
- NOCCHi, Japanese singer, dancer and J-Pop idol, member of J-Pop girlgroup Perfume (Real Name: Ayano Ōmoto, Nihongo: 大本 彩乃, Ōmoto Ayano)
- Takuya Mitsuda, Japanese manga artist (Major)
- Kotomi Kyono, Japanese actress and J-Pop singer
- Yuhki Kamatani, Japanese manga artist and illustrator (Nabari no Ou)
- Fumiaki Kobayashi, Japanese politician representing Hiroshima 7th district in the House of Representatives, the lower house of the National Diet, for the Liberal Democratic Party (LDP)
- Masuji Ibuse, Japanese author (Black Rain)
- Tatsuo Kawai, Japanese diplomat and author
- Katsuhisa Fujii, retired mixed martial artist and professional wrestler
- Makoto Hashi, former Japanese professional wrestler
- Makoto Izumitani, Japanese drummer
- Yuji Shimada, a Japanese mixed martial arts and professional wrestling referee, professional wrestling booker, authority figure and occasional wrestler
- Kazuhiro Nakamura, retired Japanese mixed martial artist
- Hiroyuki Nakano, Japanese film director
- Naomi Nishida, Japanese actress (Nabbie's Love)
- Masanori Sera, Japanese singer and actor
- Kotaro Miyachi, Japanese former professional tennis player
- Hiroshi Miyazawa, Japanese politician, former governor of Hiroshima Prefecture, younger brother of Kiichi Miyazawa and father of Yoichi Miyazawa
- Kiichi Miyazawa, Japanese politician, former Prime Minister of Japan, older brother of Hiroshi Miyazawa and uncle of Yoichi Miyazawa
- Yoichi Miyazawa, Japanese politician, member of the Liberal Democratic Party (LDP), son of Hiroshi Miyazawa and nephew of Kiichi Miyazawa
- Konami, Japanese professional wrestler (Real Name: Konami Takemoto, Nihongo: 竹本 小波, Takemoto Konami)
- Kenji Imaizumi, Japanese professional shogi player ranked 5-dan
