= Fukuyama Station =

Railway station in Fukuyama, Hiroshima Prefecture, Japan

W 14 X 14 Fukuyama Station 福山駅
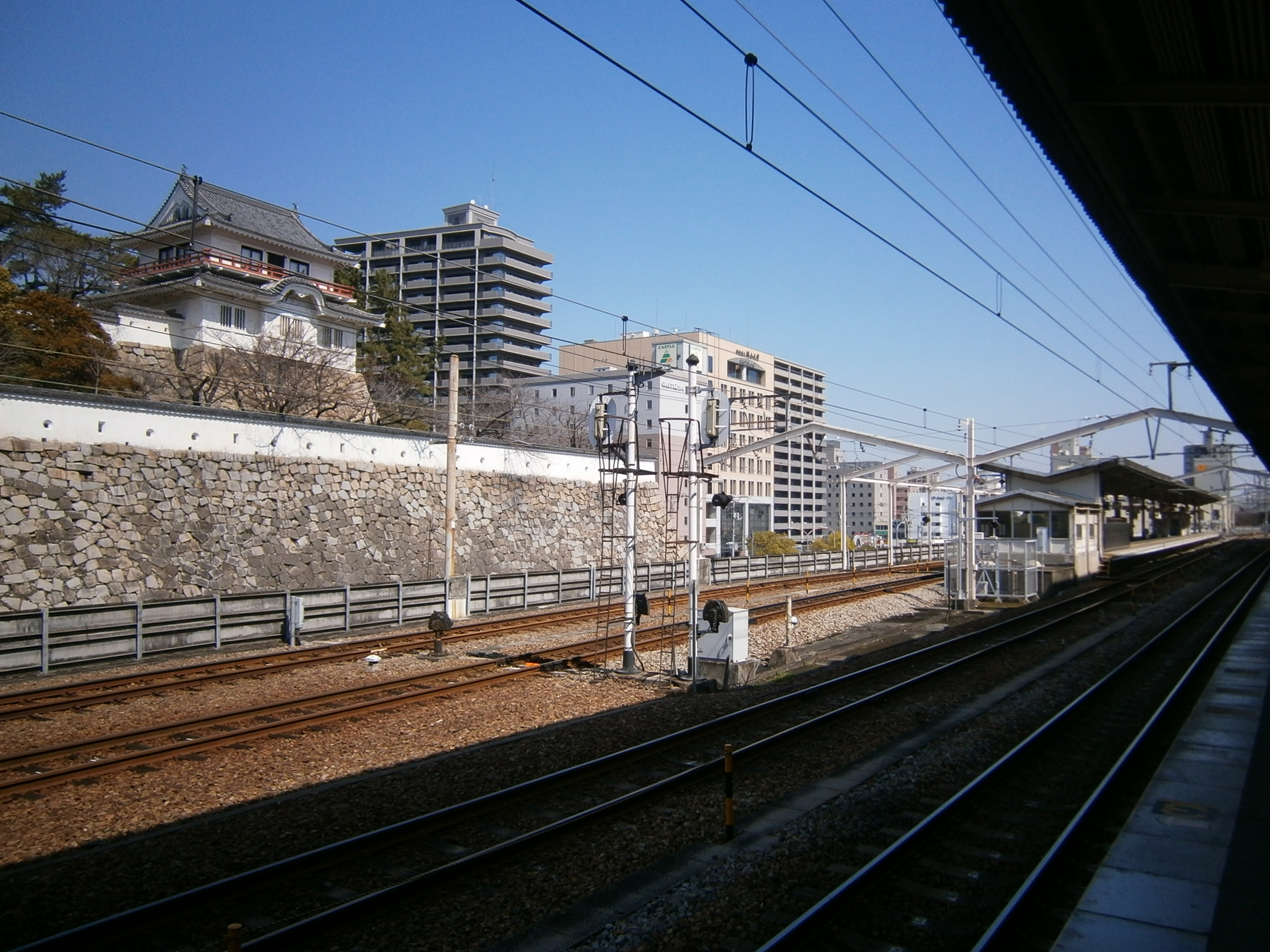
- The urban platforms of Fukuyama Station

General information
- Location: 30 Sannomaruchō, Fukuyama-shi, Hiroshima-ken 720-0066; Japan
- Coordinates: 34°29′21.2″N 133°21′41.6″E
- Owner: West Japan Railway Company
- Operator: West Japan Railway Company
- Lines: San'yō Shinkansen; W X San'yō Line; Z Fukuen Line
- Distance: 791.5 km (491.8 miles) from Tokyo
- Platforms: 2 side + 3 island platforms
- Tracks: 8
- Connections: Bus stop

Construction
- Structure type: Elevated
- Accessible: Yes

Other information
- Status: Staffed (Midori no Madoguchi)
- Station code: JR-W14, JR-X14
- Website: Official website

History
- Opened: 11 September 1891; 134 years ago

Passengers
- 2020: 14,619 daily (boarding only)

Services
| Preceding station | JR West | Following station |
|---|---|---|
| Hiroshima towards Hakata | San'yō Shinkansen Mizuho | Okayama towards Shin-Ōsaka |
| Hiroshima towards Hakata | San'yō Shinkansen Sakura | Okayama towards Shin-Ōsaka |
| Hiroshima towards Hakata | San'yō Shinkansen Nozomi | Okayama towards Shin-Ōsaka |
| Mihara towards Hakata | San'yō Shinkansen Hikari | Shin-Kurashiki towards Shin-Ōsaka |
| Shin-Onomichi towards Hakata or Hakataminami | San'yō Shinkansen Kodama | Shin-Kurashiki towards Shin-Ōsaka |

W X Z Other lines
| Preceding station | JR West | Following station |
|---|---|---|
| Bingo-Honjō towards Miyoshi | Fukuen Line Local | Terminus |
| Bingo-Akasaka towards Shimonoseki | San'yō Line Local | Higashi-Fukuyama towards Iwakuni |
| Terminus | San'yō Line Rapid Sun Liner | Kasaoka towards Okayama |
| Mihara towards Shimonoseki | San'yō Line West Express Ginga | Kurashiki towards Osaka |
Location
- Location within Hiroshima Prefecture Location within Japan

Fukuyama Station (福山駅, Fukuyama-eki) is a passenger railway station located in the city of Fukuyama, Hiroshima Prefecture, Japan. It is operated by the West Japan Railway Company (JR West).

== Lines ==
Fukuyama Station is served by the San'yō Shinkansen and is 238.6 kilometers from Shin-Osaka and 791.5 km from Tokyo. It is also served by the San'yō Main Line, and is located 201.7 kilometers from the terminus of the line at Kobe and is the southern terminus of the 85.1 kilometer Fukuen Line to Miyoshi.

== Station layout ==
The San'yō Shinkansen has two elevated opposed side platforms on the outer edge, with two tracks in the middle for through trains on the third floor of the station building. Station facilities are located on the second floor, and the conventional lines have a total of three island platforms serving six tracks on the ground level. The station has a Midori no Madoguchi staffed ticket office.

=== Platforms ===
| 1 | ■ San'yō Shinkansen | for Hiroshima, Hakata and Kagoshima-Chūō |
| 2 | ■ San'yō Shinkansen | for Shin-Osaka and Tokyo |

| 3, 4 | ■ X San'yō Main Line | for Onomichi and Mihara |
| 5, 6 | ■ W San'yō Main Line | for Kurashiki and Okayama |
| 7, 8 | ■ Z Fukuen Line | for Kannabe, Fuchū and Mihara |

== History ==
Fukuyama Station opened on 11 September 1891. With the privatization of the Japanese National Railways (JNR) on 1 April 1987, the station came under the control of JR West.

During the mid-20th century, the station was a hub for Fukuyama Transporting services, and lent its name to that company.

== Passenger statistics ==
In fiscal 2019, the station was used by an average of 21,187 passengers daily.

== Surrounding area ==
The station was built next to the main courtyard of Fukuyama Castle. The main tower of the castle is within sight of the platforms.

Other points of note in the vicinity of the station include:

- Fukuyama University
- Fukuyama Auto & Clock Museum

== See also ==
- List of railway stations in Japan
