= Mitani Station (Okayama) =

Railway station in Yakage, Okayama Prefecture, Japan

Mitani Station 三谷駅
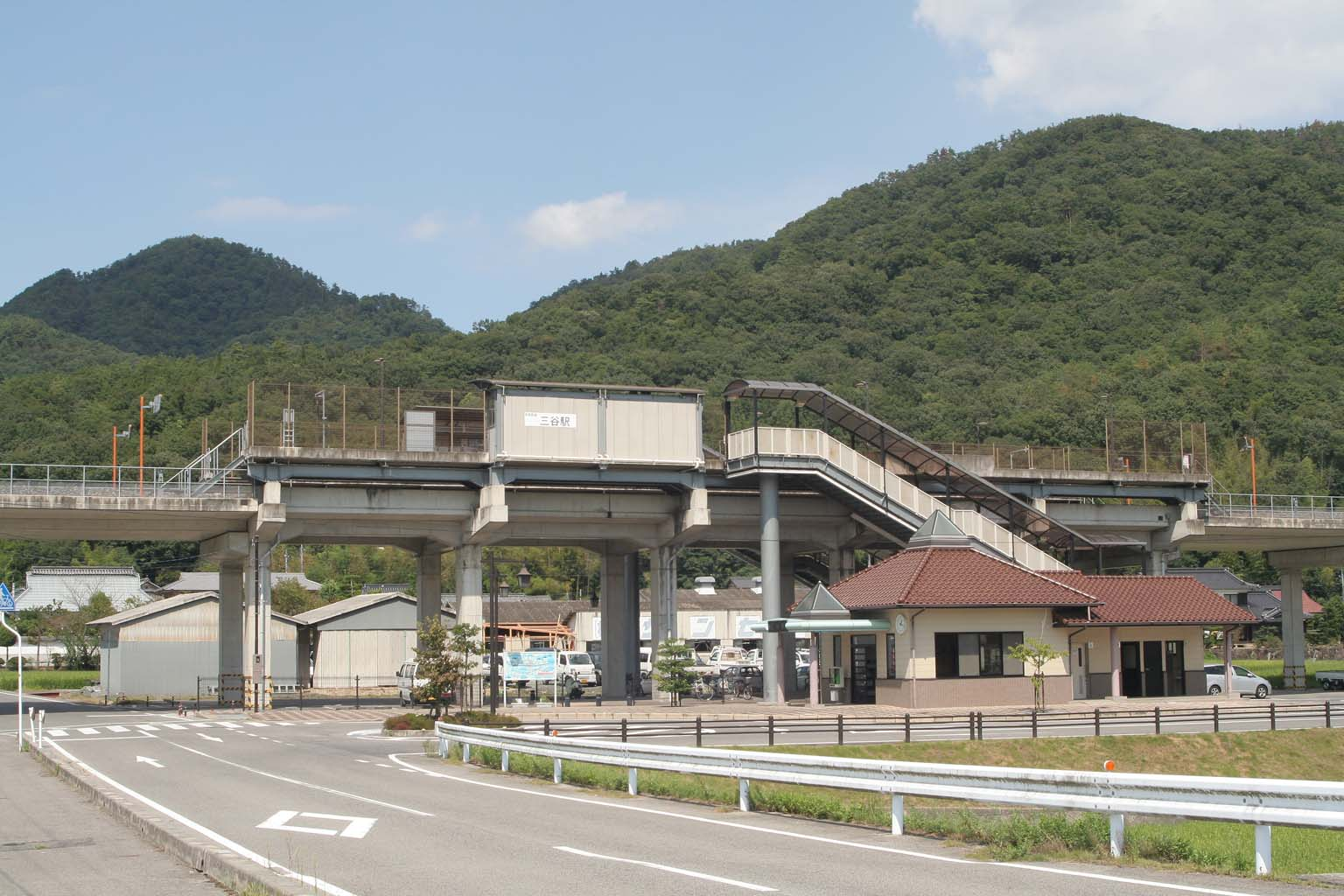
- Mitani Station, September 2007

General information
- Location: Higashiminari, Yakage-chō, Oda-gun, Okayama-ken 714-1211; Japan
- Coordinates: 34°36′58.90″N 133°37′10.71″E
- Operator: Ibara Railway Company
- Line: ■ Ibara Line
- Distance: 15.1 km (9.4 miles) from Sōja
- Platforms: 2 side platform
- Tracks: 2

Other information
- Status: Unstaffed
- Website: Official website

History
- Opened: 11 January 1999

Passengers
- 2018: 65 daily
Location
- Location within Okayama Prefecture Location within Japan

Mitani Station (三谷駅, Mitani-eki) is a passenger railway station located in the town of Yakage, Okayama Prefecture, Japan. It is operated by the third sector transportation company, Ibara Railway Company).

== Lines ==
Mitani Station is served by the Ibara Line, and is located 15.1 kilometers from the terminus of the line at Sōja.

== Station layout ==
The station consists of two opposed elevated side platforms, with the station building located underneath; however, it is not necessary to go through the station building to enter and exit the platform. The station is unattended.

=== Platforms ===
| 1 | ■ Ibara Line | for Ibara and Kannabe |
| 2 | ■ Ibara Line | for Kiyone and Sōja |

== Adjacent stations ==
| « | Service | » |
Ibara Railway
Ibara Line
| Bitchū-Kurese | - | Yakage |

== History ==
Mitani Station was opened on January 11, 1999, with the opening of the Ibara Line.

== Passenger statistics ==
In fiscal 2018, the station was used by an average of 65 passengers daily.

== Surrounding area ==
- Yakage Municipal Mitani Elementary School
- Japan National Route 486

== See also ==
- List of railway stations in Japan
