= Yakage Station =

Railway station in Yakage, Okayama Prefecture, Japan

Yakage Station 矢掛駅
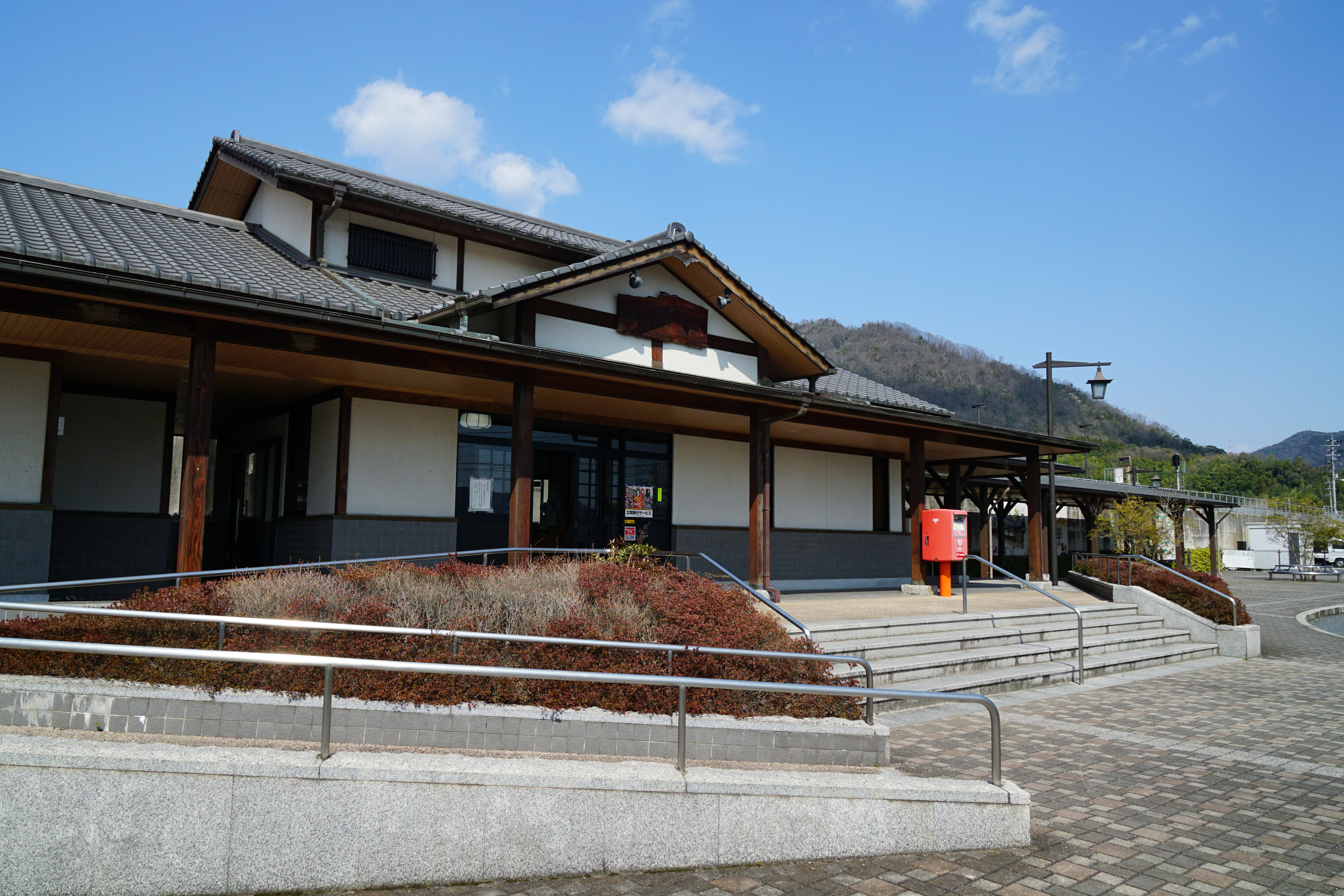
- Yakage Station, September 2007

General information
- Location: Yakage, Yakage-chō, Oda-gun, Okayama-ken 714-1201; Japan
- Coordinates: 34°37′45.32″N 133°35′23.60″E
- Operator: Ibara Railway Company
- Line: ■ Ibara Line
- Distance: 18.2 km (11.3 miles) from Sōja
- Platforms: 1 island platform
- Tracks: 2

Other information
- Status: Staffed
- Website: Official website

History
- Opened: 11 January 1999

Passengers
- 2018: 733 daily
Location
- Location within Okayama Prefecture Location within Japan

Yakage Station (矢掛駅, Yakage-eki) is a passenger railway station located in the town of Yakage, Okayama Prefecture, Japan. It is operated by the third sector transportation company, Ibara Railway Company).

== Lines ==
Yakage Station is served by the Ibara Line, and is located 18.2 kilometers from the terminus of the line at Sōja.

== Station layout ==
The station consists of one elevated island platform. The station building on the southwest side of the platform is a Japanese-style building inspired by the post town of Yakage. The station is staffed.

=== Platforms ===
1	■ Ibara Line	for Ibara and Kannabe
2	■ Ibara Line	for Kiyone and Sōja

== Adjacent stations ==
«	Service	»
Ibara Railway
Ibara Line
Mitani	-	Oda

== History ==
Yakage Station was opened on January 11, 1999 with the opening of the Ibara Line.

== Passenger statistics ==
In fiscal 2018, the station was used by an average of 733 passengers daily.

== Surrounding area ==
- Yakage Town Hall
- Yakage Cultural Center
- Okayama Prefectural Yakage High School

== See also ==
- List of railway stations in Japan
