= Kibinomakibi Station =

Railway station in Kurashiki, Okayama Prefecture, Japan

Kibinomakibi Station 吉備真備駅
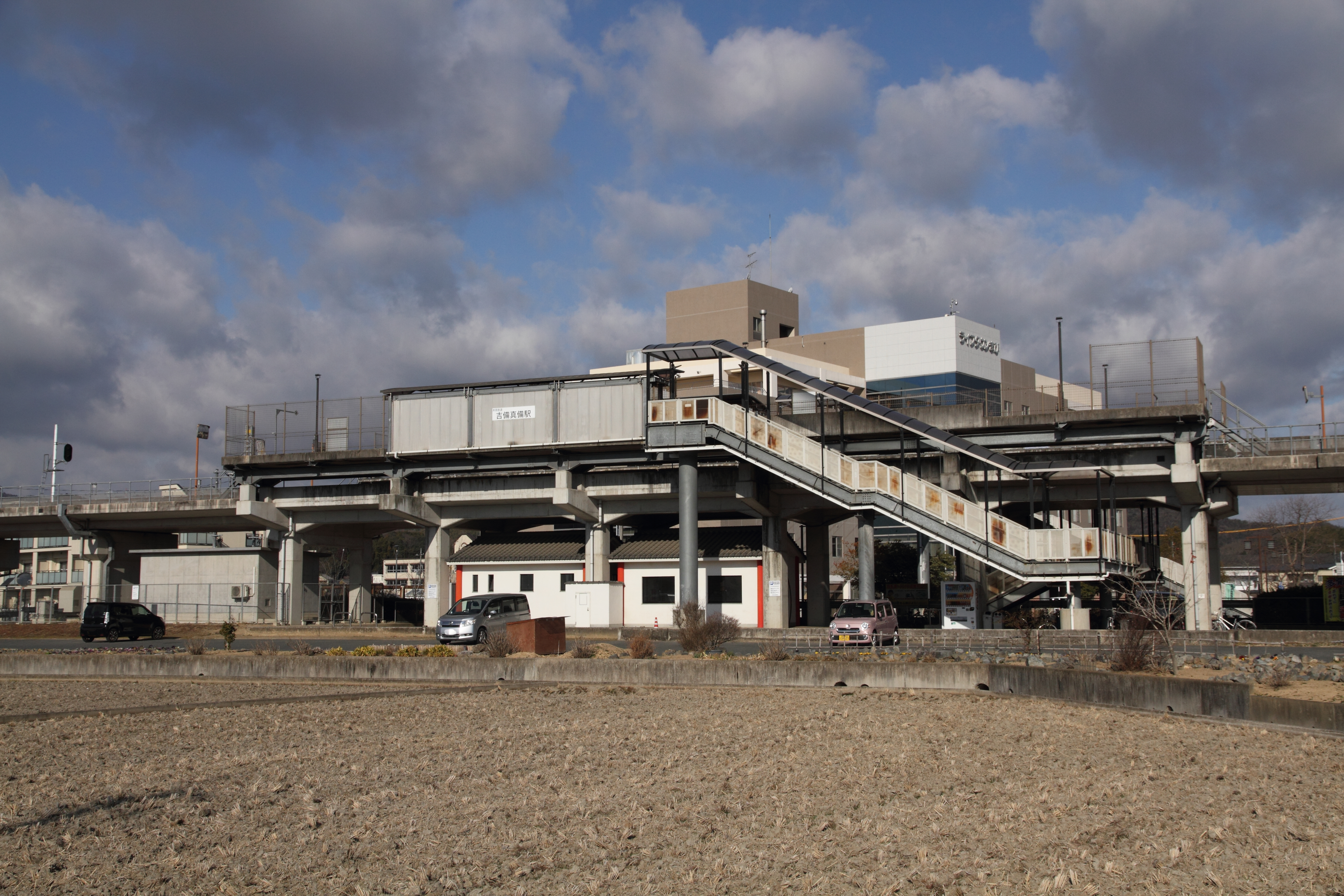
- Kibinomakibi Station, February 2022

General information
- Location: Mabi-chō, Kurashiki-shi, Okayama-ken 710-1301; Japan
- Coordinates: 34°37′36.60″N 133°41′31.08″E
- Operator: Ibara Railway Company
- Line: ■ Ibara Line
- Distance: 8.2 km (5.1 miles) from Sōja
- Platforms: 2 side platforms
- Tracks: 2

Other information
- Status: Staffed
- Website: Official website

History
- Opened: 11 January 1999

Passengers
- 2018: 514 daily
Location
- Location within Okayama Prefecture Location within Japan

Kibinomakibi Station (吉備真備駅, Kibinomakibi-eki) is a passenger railway station located in the city of Kurashiki, Okayama Prefecture, Japan. It is operated by the third sector transportation company, Ibara Railway Company). The station was named after Kibi no Makibi, an 8th Century scholar and statesman from the region.

== Lines ==
Kibinomakibi Station is served by the Ibara Line, and is located 8.2 kilometers from the terminus of the line at Sōja.

== Station layout ==
The station consists of two elevated side platforms with the station facilities underneath. The station is staffed.

=== Platforms ===
1	■ Ibara Line	for Ibara and Kannabe
2	■ Ibara Line	for Kiyone and Sōja

== Adjacent stations ==
«	Service	»
Ibara Railway
Ibara Line
Kawabejuku	-	Bitchū-Kurese

== History ==
Kibinomakibi Station was opened on January 11, 1999 with the opening of the Ibara Line.

== Passenger statistics ==
In fiscal 2018, the station was used by an average of 514 passengers daily.

== Surrounding area ==
- Kurashiki City Hall Mabi Branch (former Mabi Town Hall)
- Okayama Prefectural Kurashiki Makibi Support School
- Kurashiki City Mabi Junior High School
- Kurashiki Municipal Yata Elementary School

== See also ==
- List of railway stations in Japan
