= List of railway stations named after people =

This is a list of railway stations named after people. It details the name of the railway station, its location and eponym. All these facilities' names end with "station", unless otherwise noted.

Railway station	Location	Country	Eponym
Anderson Regional Transportation Center	Woburn, Massachusetts	United States	James R. "Jimmy" Anderson
Anzen (安善)	Yokohama, Kanagawa	Japan	Yasuda Zenjirō (安田善次郎)
Asano (浅野)	Yokohama, Kanagawa	Japan	Asano Sōichirō (浅野総一郎)
Bray Daly	Bray	Ireland	Edward Daly
Cork Kent	Cork	Ireland	Thomas Kent
Denfert-Rochereau	Paris	France	Pierre Philippe Denfert-Rochereau
Diridon	San Jose, California	United States	Rod Diridon Sr.
Drogheda MacBride	Drogheda	Ireland	John MacBride
Dublin Connolly	Dublin	Ireland	James Connolly
Dublin Heuston	Dublin	Ireland	Seán Heuston
Dublin Pearse	Dublin	Ireland	Patrick Pearse and Willie Pearse
Dún Laoghaire/Mallin	Dún Laoghaire	Ireland	Michael Mallin
Dundalk Clarke	Dundalk	Ireland	Tom Clarke
Fatmawati Indomaret MRT station	Cilandak, South Jakarta	Indonesia	Fatmawati
Federico Lacroze	Buenos Aires	Argentina	Federico Lacroze
Galway Ceannt	Galway	Ireland	Éamonn Ceannt
Haji Nawi MRT station	Cilandak, South Jakarta	Indonesia	Haji Nawi
Jerusalem Yitzhak Navon	Jerusalem	Israel	Yitzhak Navon
Juanda Station	Gambir, Jakarta	Indonesia	Djuanda Kartawidjaja
Joseph Scelsi Intermodal Transportation Center	Pittsfield, Massachusetts	United States	Joseph Scelsi
Kibinomakibi (吉備真備)	Kurashiki, Okayama	Japan	Kibi no Makibi (吉備真備)
Kilkenny MacDonagh	Kilkenny	Ireland	Thomas MacDonagh
Lelylaan	Amsterdam	Netherlands	Cornelis Lely
Limerick Colbert	Limerick	Ireland	Con Colbert
London St Pancras	London, England	United Kingdom	Saint Pancras
Manchester Victoria	Manchester, England	United Kingdom	Queen Victoria
Martin Luther King Jr. Plaza	Toledo, Ohio	United States	Martin Luther King Jr.
Montpellier Saint-Roch	Montpellier	France	Saint Roch
Moynihan Train Hall	New York City	United States	Daniel Patrick Moynihan
Ogilvie Transportation Center	Chicago	United States	Richard B. Ogilvie
Puratchi Thalaivar Dr. M.G. Ramachandran Central Railway Station	Chennai	India	M. G. Ramachandran
Puratchi Thalaivar Dr. M.G. Ramachandran Central metro station	Chennai	India	M. G. Ramachandran
Ramses	Cairo	Egypt	Ramesses II
Sligo Mac Diarmada	Sligo	Ireland	Seán Mac Diarmada
Sudirman railway station	Menteng, Central Jakarta	Indonesia	Sudirman
Sōunnosato-Ebara (早雲の里荏原)	Ibara, Okayama	Japan	Hōjō Sōun (北条早雲)
Tel Aviv Savidor Central	Tel Aviv	Israel	Menachem Savidor
Tralee Casement	Tralee	Ireland	Roger Casement
Walter Rand Transportation Center	Camden, New Jersey	United States	Walter Rand
Waterford Plunkett	Waterford	Ireland	Joseph Plunkett
Wexford O'Hanrahan	Wexford	Ireland	Michael O'Hanrahan
Joseph R. Biden, Jr., Railroad Station	Wilmington, Delaware	United States	Joseph R. Biden, Jr.

== See also ==
- List of eponyms
- List of places named after people
- List of airports named after people
- List of railway stations
