= Goryō Station (Hiroshima) =

Railway station in Fukuyama, Hiroshima Prefecture, Japan

Goryō Station 御領駅
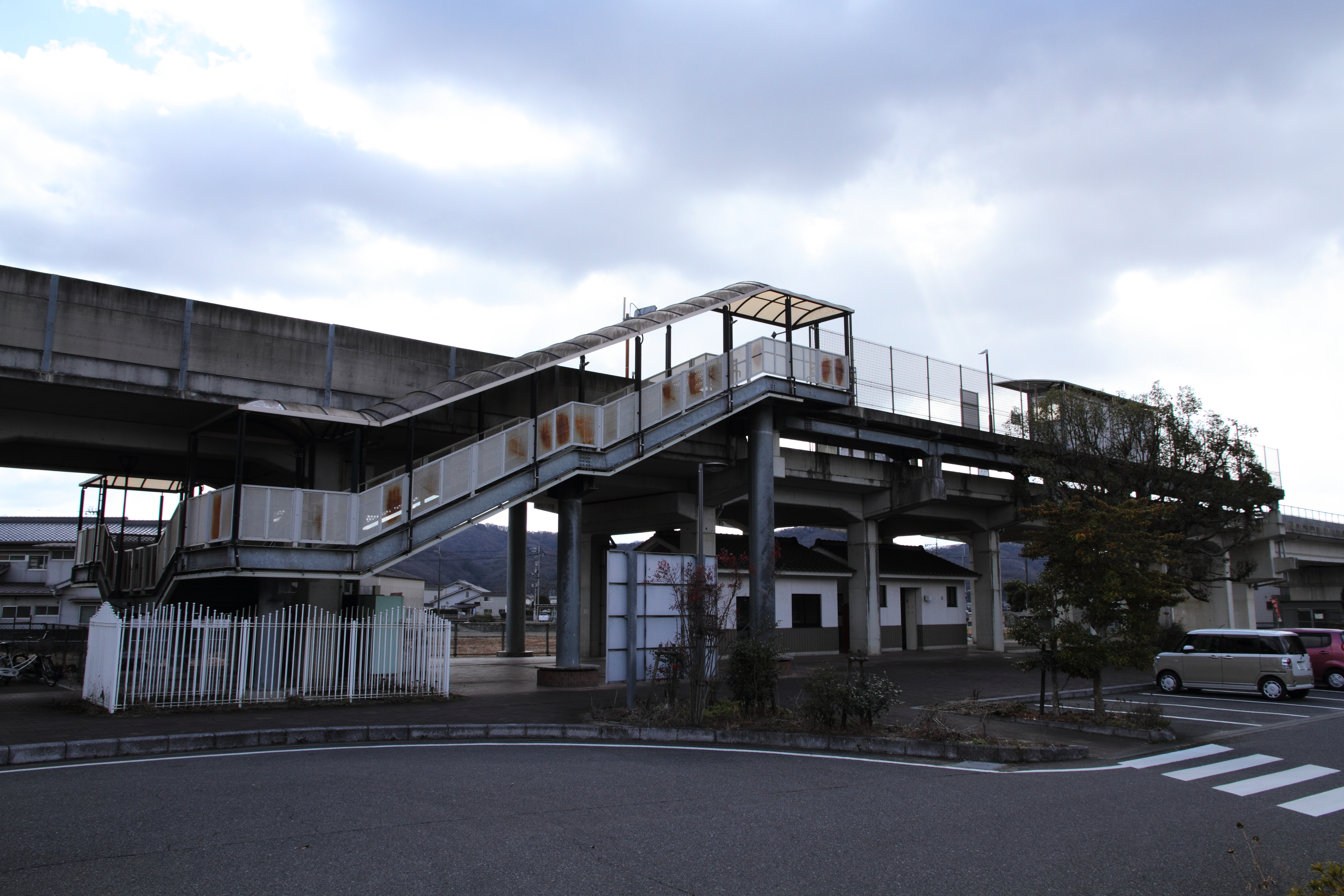
- Goryō Station, February 2022

General information
- Location: Shimogoryō Kannabechō, Fukuyama-shi, Hiroshima-ken 720-2117; Japan
- Coordinates: 34°33′54.01″N 133°24′9.38″E
- Operator: Ibara Railway Company
- Line: ■ Ibara Line
- Distance: 37.6 km (23.4 miles) from Sōja
- Platforms: 2 side platforms
- Tracks: 2

Other information
- Status: Unstaffed
- Website: Official website

History
- Opened: 11 January 1999

Passengers
- 2018: 93 daily
Location
- Location within Hiroshima Prefecture Location within Japan

Goryō Station (御領駅, Goryō-eki) is a passenger railway station located in the city of Fukuyama, Hiroshima Prefecture, Japan. It is operated by the third sector transportation company, Ibara Railway Company).

== Lines ==
Goryō Station is served by the Ibara Line, and is located 37.6 kilometers from the terminus of the line at Sōja.

== Station layout ==
The station consists of two elevated opposed side platforms with a waiting room underneath. There are no other station facilities, and the station is unattended.

There are no ticket machines at this station, and the trains are usually operated by a single driver. In Japan, this type of train is called one-man train.

=== Platforms ===
1	■ Ibara Line	for Kannabe
2	■ Ibara Line	for Ibara and Sōja

== Adjacent stations ==
«	Service	»
Ibara Railway
Ibara Line
Komoriutanosato-Takaya	-	Yuno

== History ==
Goryō Station was opened on January 11, 1999 with the opening of the Ibara Line.

== Passenger statistics ==
In fiscal 2018, the station was used by an average of 93 passengers daily.

== Surrounding area ==
- Fukuyama City Kanbehigashi Junior High School
- Fukuyama Municipal Mino Elementary School
- Japan National Route 313

Near the station, there is Goryo Post Office. There is also a mountain called Mount Goryo nearby. According to local legend, an oni (Japanise demon) once lived surrounding area on the mountain.

== See also ==
- List of railway stations in Japan
