= Sōunnosato-Ebara Station =

Railway station in Ibara, Okayama Prefecture, Japan

Sōunnosato-Ebara Station 早雲の里荏原駅
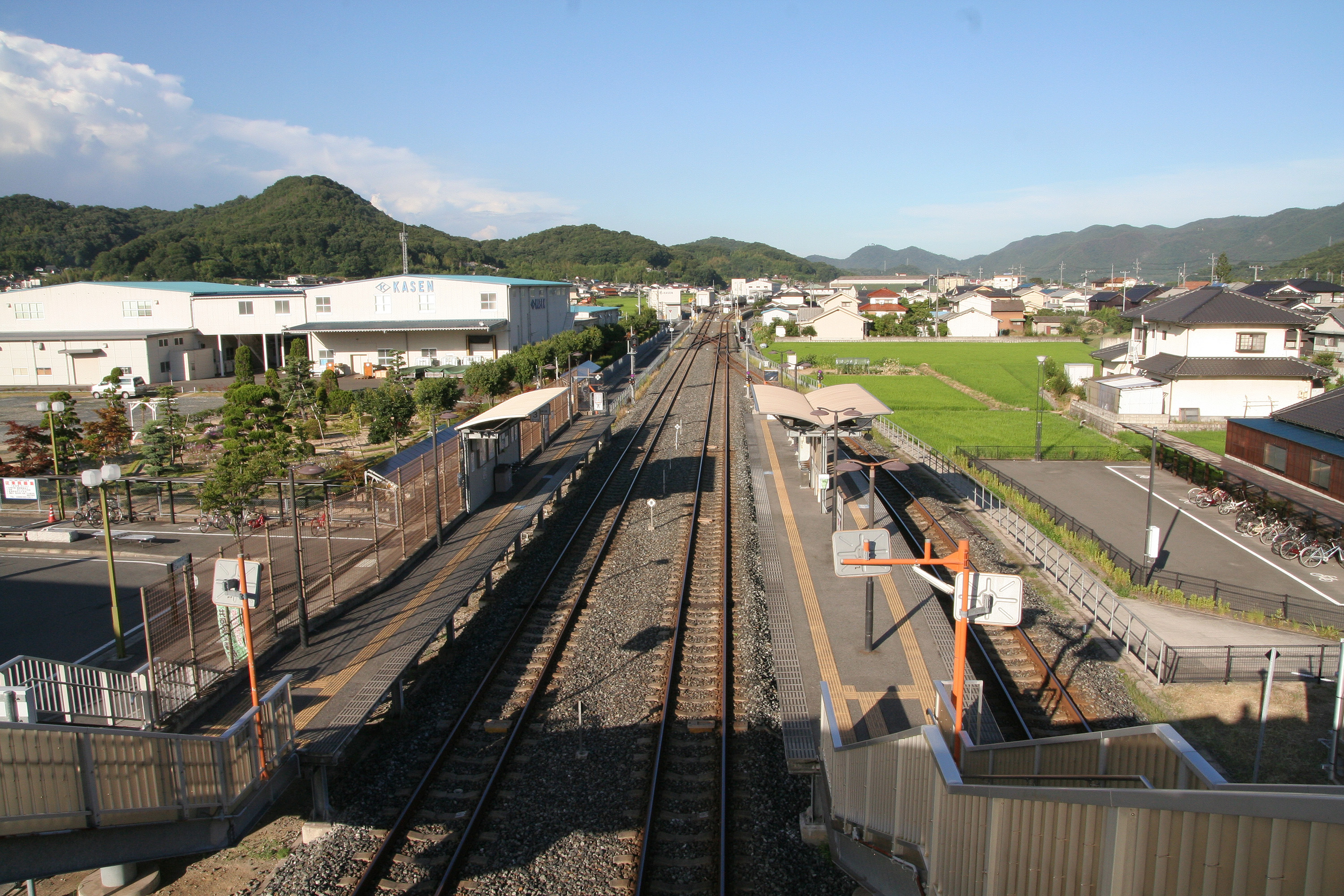
- Sōunnosato-Ebara Station platform, July 200

General information
- Location: 856-4 Higashiebara-chō, Ibara-shi, Okayama-ken 715-0003; Japan
- Coordinates: 34°35′48.04″N 133°30′27.84″E
- Operator: Ibara Railway Company
- Line: ■ Ibara Line
- Distance: 26.8 km (16.7 miles) from Sōja
- Platforms: 1 side + 1 island platform
- Tracks: 3

Other information
- Status: Unstaffed
- Website: Official website

History
- Opened: 11 January 1999

Passengers
- 2018: 209 daily
Location
- Location within Okayama Prefecture Location within Japan

Sōunnosato-Ebara Station (早雲の里荏原駅, Sōunnosato-Ebara-eki) is a passenger railway station located in the city of Ibara, Okayama Prefecture, Japan. It is operated by the third sector transportation company, Ibara Railway Company).

== Lines ==
Sōunnosato-Ebara Station is served by the Ibara Line, and is located 26.8 kilometers from the terminus of the line at Sōja.

== Station layout ==
The station consists of one side platform and one island platform connected by a footbridge. The station is unattended; however, the head office of the Ibara Railway Company and railroad depot are located within the station premises.

=== Platforms ===
| 1 | ■ Ibara Line | for Ibara and Kannabe |
| 2, 3 | ■ Ibara Line | for Kiyone and Sōja |

== Adjacent stations ==
| « | Service | » |
Ibara Railway
Ibara Line
| Oda | - | Ibara |

== History ==
Sōunnosato-Ebara Station was opened on January 11, 1999 with the opening of the Ibara Line.

== Passenger statistics ==
In fiscal 2018, the station was used by an average of 209 passengers daily.

== Surrounding area ==
- Ibara Railway Head Office

== See also ==
- List of railway stations in Japan
