= Komoriutanosato-Takaya Station =

Railway station in Ibara, Okayama Prefecture, Japan

Komoriutanosato-Takaya Station 子守唄の里高屋駅
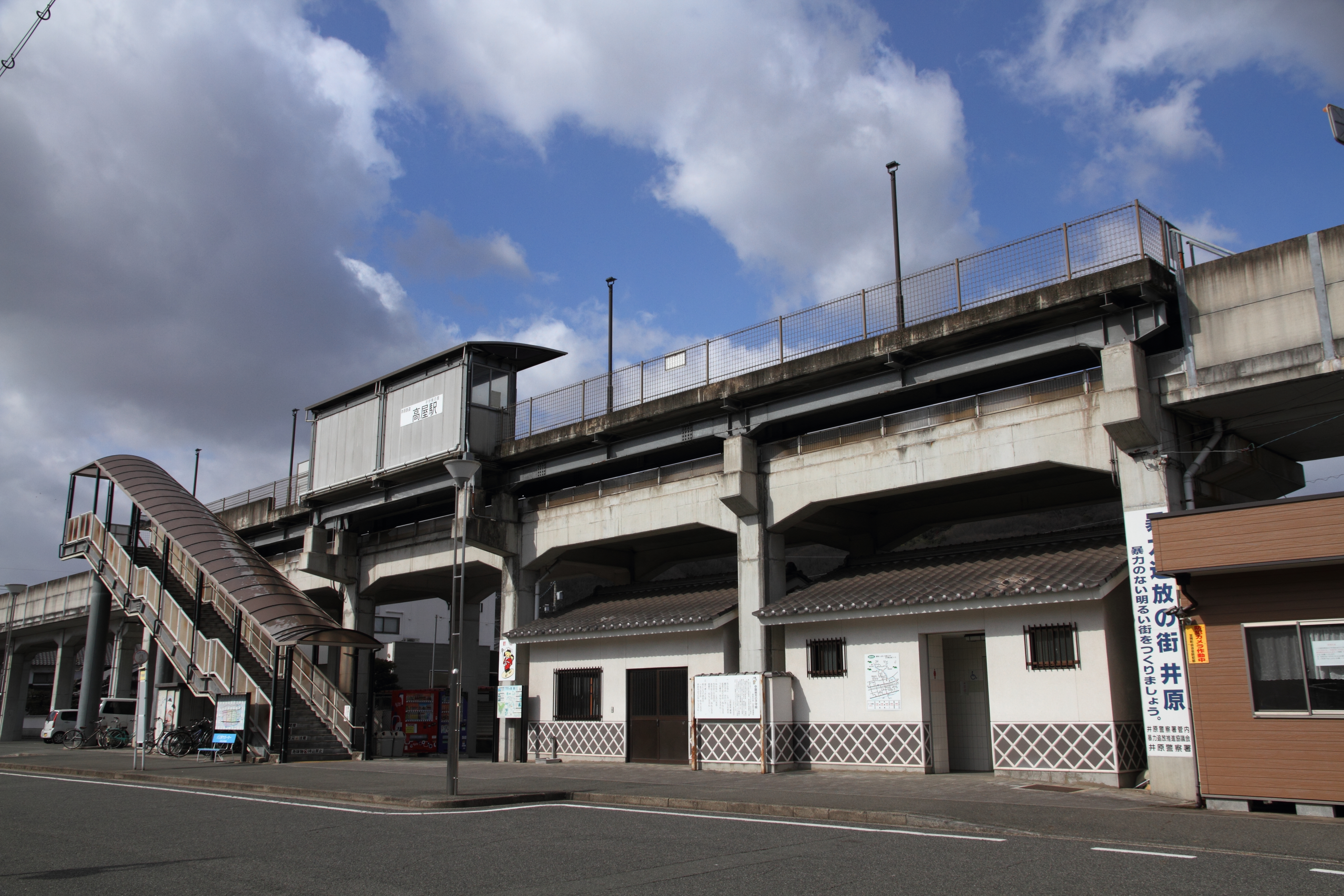
- Komoriutanosato-Takaya Station, February 2002

General information
- Location: 3-chōme Takaya-chō, Ibara-shi, Okayama-ken 715-0024; Japan
- Coordinates: 34°34′54.45″N 133°26′0.01″E
- Operator: Ibara Railway Company
- Line: ■ Ibara Line
- Distance: 34.1 km (21.2 miles) from Sōja
- Platforms: 1 side platform
- Tracks: 1

Other information
- Status: Unstaffed
- Website: Official website

History
- Opened: 11 January 1999

Passengers
- 2018: 192 daily
Location
- Location within Okayama Prefecture Location within Japan

Komoriutanosato-Takaya Station (子守唄の里高屋駅, Komoriutanosato-Takaya-eki) is a passenger railway station located in the city of Ibara, Okayama Prefecture, Japan. It is operated by the third sector transportation company, Ibara Railway Company).

== Lines ==
Komoriutanosato-Takaya Station is served by the Ibara Line, and is located 34.1 kilometers from the terminus of the line at Sōja.

== Station layout ==
The station consists of one elevated side platform with the station facilities underneath. The station is unattended.

== Adjacent stations ==
| « | Service | » |
Ibara Railway
Ibara Line
| Izue | - | Goryō |

== History ==
Komoriutanosato-Takaya Station was opened on January 11, 1999 with the opening of the Ibara Line.

== Passenger statistics ==
In fiscal 2018, the station was used by an average of 192 passengers daily.

== Surrounding area ==
- Chugoku Region Lullaby Monument
- Hanako Otsuka Museum of Art
- Japan National Route 313

== See also ==
- List of railway stations in Japan
