= Kawabejuku Station =

Railway station in Kurashiki, Okayama Prefecture, Japan

Kawabejuku Station 川辺宿駅
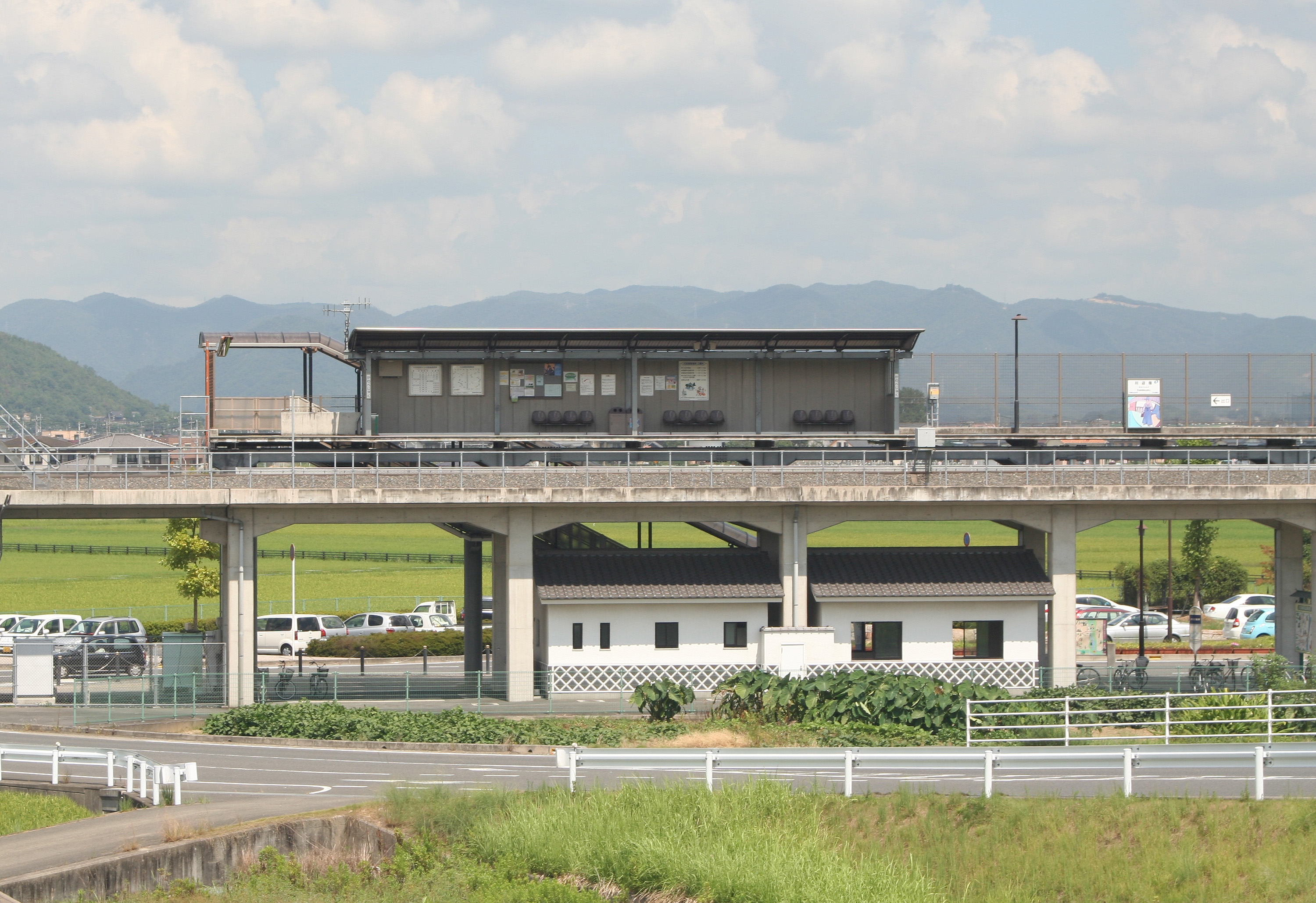
- Kawabejuku Station, September 2007

General information
- Location: Mabi-chō Kawabe, Kurashiki-shi, Okayama-ken 710-1313; Japan
- Coordinates: 34°37′56.65″N 133°42′53.67″E
- Operator: Ibara Railway Company
- Line: ■ Ibara Line
- Distance: 6.0 km (3.7 miles) from Sōja
- Platforms: 1 side platform
- Tracks: 1

Other information
- Status: Unstaffed
- Website: Official website

History
- Opened: 11 January 1999

Passengers
- 2018: 189 daily
Location
- Location within Okayama Prefecture Location within Japan

Kawabejuku Station (川辺宿駅, Kawabejuku-eki) is a passenger railway station located in the city of Kurashiki, Okayama Prefecture, Japan. It is operated by the third sector transportation company, Ibara Railway Company).

== Lines ==
Kawabejuku Station is served by the Ibara Line, and is located 6.0 kilometers from the terminus of the line at Sōja.

== Station layout ==
The station consists of one elevated side platform serving a single bi-directional track, with the station facilities underneath. The station is unattended.

== Adjacent stations ==
«	Service	»
Ibara Railway
Ibara Line
Kiyone	-	Kibinomakibi

== History ==
Kawabejuku Station was opened on January 11, 1999, with the opening of the Ibara Line.

== Passenger statistics ==
In fiscal 2018, the station was used by an average of 189 passengers daily.

== Surrounding area ==
- Mabi Memorial Hospital
- Japan National Route 486

== See also ==
- List of railway stations in Japan
