= Bitchū-Kurese Station =

Railway station in Kurashiki, Okayama Prefecture, Japan

Bitchū-Kurese Station 備中呉妹駅
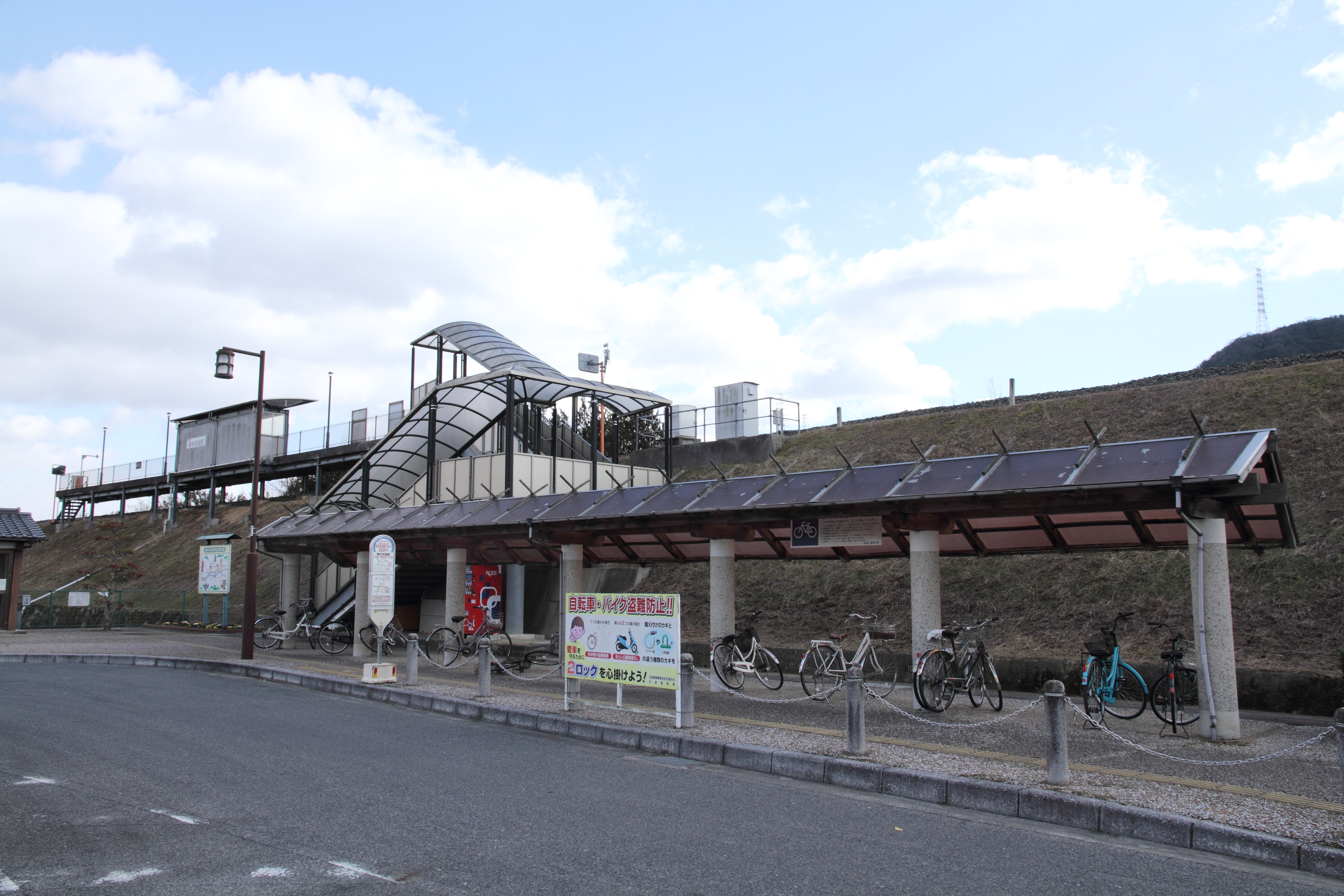
- Bitchū-Kurese Station, February 2022

General information
- Location: Mabi-chō Osaki-Ino 1365, Kurashiki-shi, Okayama-ken 710-1304; Japan
- Coordinates: 34°37′17.75″N 133°39′42.55″E
- Operator: Ibara Railway Company
- Line: ■ Ibara Line
- Distance: 11.1 km (6.9 miles) from Sōja
- Platforms: 1 side platform
- Tracks: 1

Other information
- Status: Unstaffed
- Website: Official website

History
- Opened: 11 January 1999

Passengers
- 2018: 87 daily
Location
- Location within Okayama Prefecture Location within Japan

Bitchū-Kurese Station (備中呉妹駅, Bitchū-Kurese-eki) is a passenger railway station located in the city of Kurashiki, Okayama Prefecture, Japan. It is operated by the third sector transportation company, Ibara Railway Company).

== Lines ==
Bitchū-Kurese Station is served by the Ibara Line, and is located 11.1 kilometers from the terminus of the line at Sōja.

== Station layout ==
The station consists of one side platform on an embankment with the station facilities underneath. The station is unattended.

== Adjacent stations ==
«	Service	»
Ibara Railway
Ibara Line
Kibinomakibi	-	Mitani

== History ==
Bitchū-Kurese Station was opened on January 11, 1999 with the opening of the Ibara Line.

== Passenger statistics ==
In fiscal 2018, the station was used by an average of 87 passengers daily.

== Surrounding area ==
- Kurashiki City Kurashiki Elementary School
- Japan National Route 486

== See also ==
- List of railway stations in Japan
