= Izue Station =

Railway station in Ibara, Okayama Prefecture, Japan

Izue Station いずえ駅
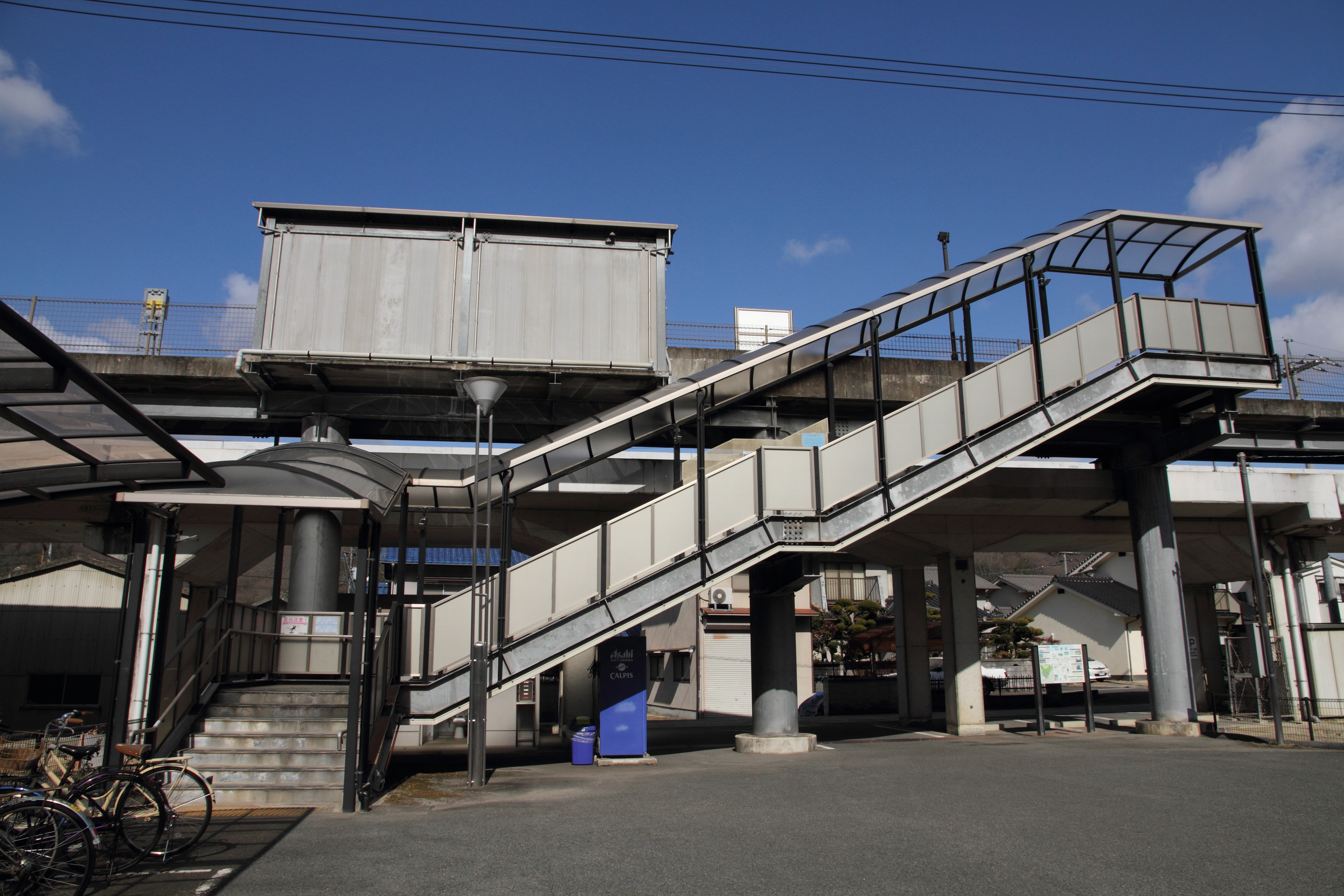
- Izue Station, February 2002

General information
- Location: Shimoizue-chō, Ibara-shi, Okayama-ken 715-0022; Japan
- Coordinates: 34°35′16.67″N 133°27′2.79″E
- Operator: Ibara Railway Company
- Line: ■ Ibara Line
- Distance: 32.3 km (20.1 miles) from Sōja
- Platforms: 1 side platform
- Tracks: 1

Other information
- Status: Unstaffed
- Website: Official website

History
- Opened: 11 January 1999

Passengers
- 2018: 56 daily
Location
- Location within Okayama Prefecture Location within Japan

Izue Station (いずえ駅, Izue-eki) is a passenger railway station located in the city of Ibara, Okayama Prefecture, Japan. It is operated by the third sector transportation company, Ibara Railway Company).

== Lines ==
Izue Station is served by the Ibara Line, and is located 32.3 kilometers from the terminus of the line at Sōja.

== Station layout ==
The station consists of one elevated side platform with the station facilities underneath. The station is unattended.

== Adjacent stations ==
«	Service	»
Ibara Railway
Ibara Line
Ibara	-	Komoriutanosato-Takaya

== History ==
Izue Station was opened on January 11, 1999 with the opening of the Ibara Line.

== Passenger statistics ==
In fiscal 2018, the station was used by an average of 56 passengers daily.

== Surrounding area ==
- Japan National Route 313

== See also ==
- List of railway stations in Japan
