= Yuno =

Yuno may refer to:

== People ==
- Yuno Miles (21st century), American rapper
- Yuno Yamanaka (山中 柚乃; born 2000), Japanese middle-distance runner
- Yuno, in-game name of Remilia (1995–2019), American professional gamer
- Yuno (musician), American musician

== Fictional characters ==
- Yuno (Black Clover), a character in the manga series Black Clover
- Yuno, protagonist of the manga series Hidamari Sketch
- Yuno Gasai, a character in the manga series Future Diary
- Yuno Kashima, a character in the anime series Little Battlers Experience WARS

== Other uses ==
- Yuno Station, a railway station in Fukuyama, Hiroshima Prefecture, Japan
- Yu-no, a video game
