= Oda Station (Okayama) =

Railway station in Yakage, Okayama Prefecture, Japan

Oda Station 小田駅
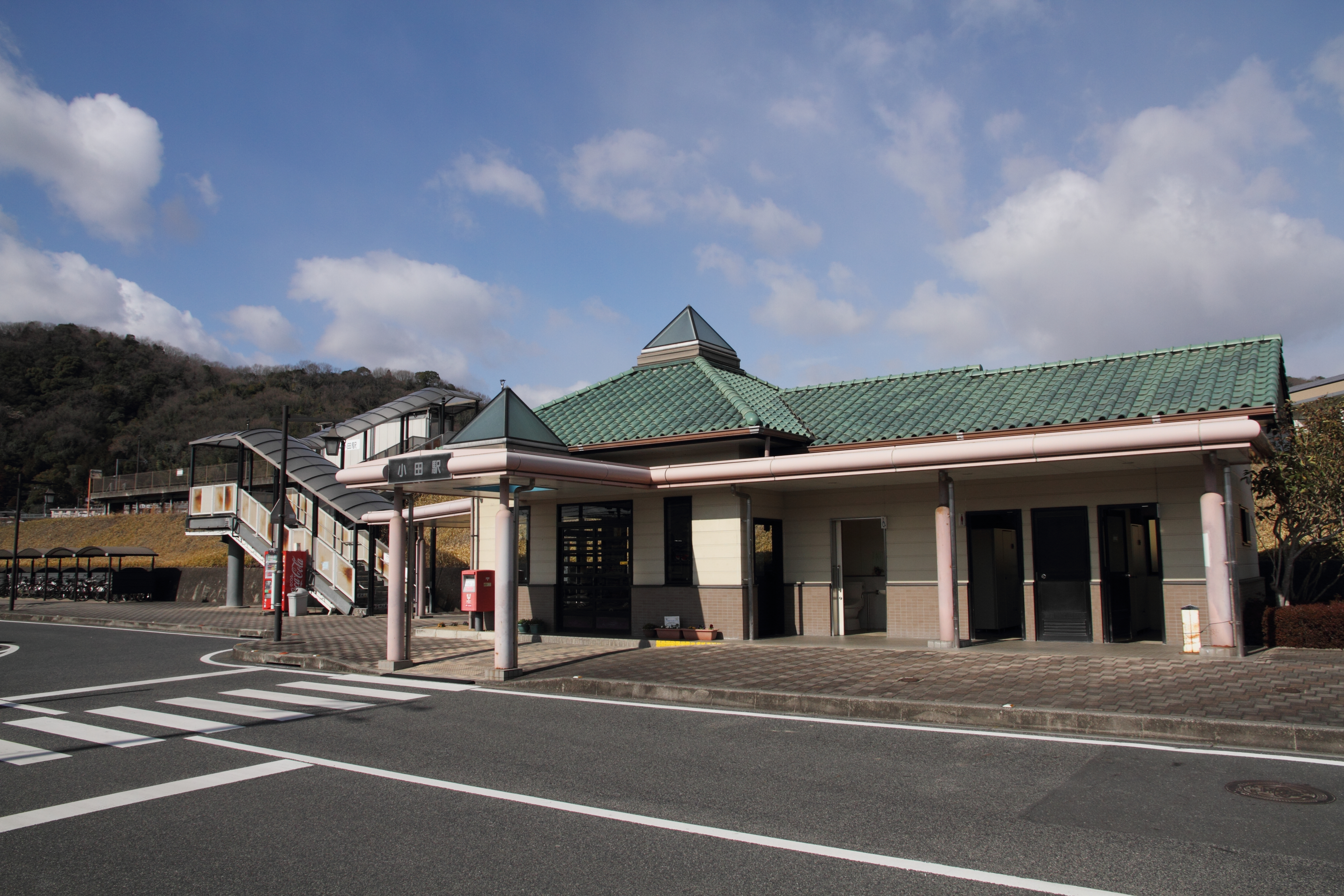
- Oda Station, June 2022

General information
- Location: Oda, Yakage-chō, Oda-gun, Okayama-ken 714-1227; Japan
- Coordinates: 34°36′21.74″N 133°32′34.08″E
- Operator: Ibara Railway Company
- Line: ■ Ibara Line
- Distance: 23.4 km (14.5 miles) from Sōja
- Platforms: 1 side platform
- Tracks: 1

Other information
- Status: Unstaffed
- Website: Official website

History
- Opened: 11 January 1999

Passengers
- 2018: 100 daily
Location
- Location within Okayama Prefecture Location within Japan

Oda Station (小田駅, Oda-eki) is a passenger railway station located in the town of Yakage, Okayama Prefecture, Japan. It is operated by the third sector transportation company, Ibara Railway Company).

== Lines ==
Oda Station is served by the Ibara Line, and is located 23.4 kilometers from the terminus of the line at Sōja.

== Station layout ==
The station consists of one ground level side platform serving a single bi-directional track. There is a station building on the southeast side of the platform, but it houses the office of a rental cycle company, and there is ticketing service, and it is possible to enter and exit the platform without going through the station building. The station is unattended.

== Adjacent stations ==
| « | Service | » |
Ibara Railway
Ibara Line
| Yakage | - | Sōunnosato-Ebara |

== History ==
Oda Station was opened on January 11, 1999 with the opening of the Ibara Line.

== Passenger statistics ==
In fiscal 2018, the station was used by an average of 100 passengers daily.

== Surrounding area ==
The area southwest of the station is a quiet townscape that retains the vestiges of the old Sanyo highway, and old Western-style buildings can be seen here and there. In addition, in the square in front of the station, there is a monument commemorating Shotetsu, a poet from the Muromachi period who was born here.

- Yakage Municipal Oda Elementary School

== See also ==
- List of railway stations in Japan
