= Mitani Station =

Mitani Station (三谷駅) is the name of two train stations in Japan:

- Mitani Station (Okayama)
- Mitani Station (Yamaguchi)
