= Goryō Station =

Goryō Station is the name of two train stations in Japan:

- Goryō Station (Hiroshima)
- Goryō Station (Kagoshima)
