= Yokoo Station =

Railway station in Fukuyama, Hiroshima Prefecture, Japan

Yokoo Station 横尾駅
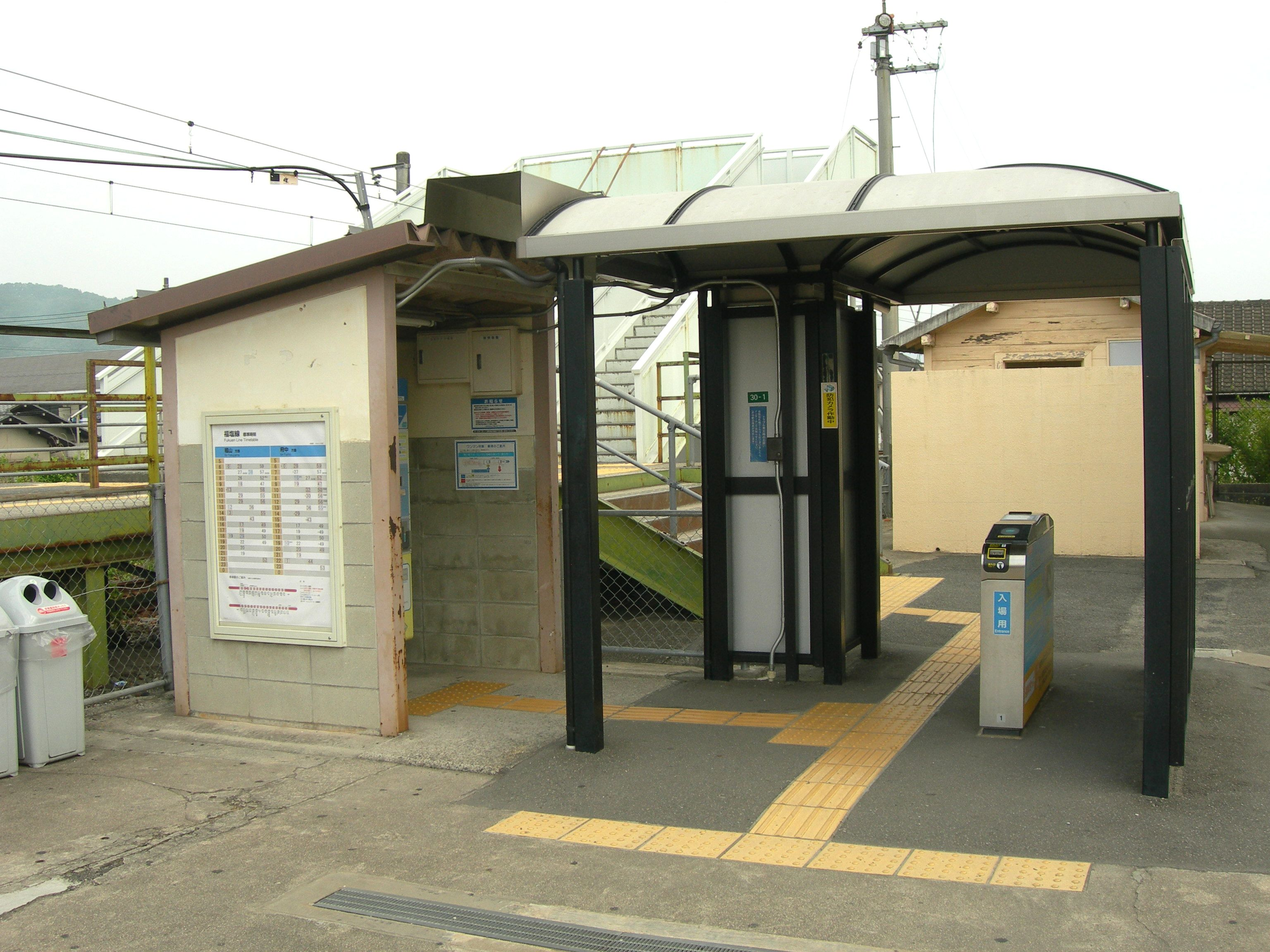
- Yokoo Station, July 2011

General information
- Location: 1-chōme-30 Yokoochō,, Fukuyama-shi, Hiroshima-ken 720-0011; Japan
- Coordinates: 34°31′17.93″N 133°21′48.17″E
- Owner: West Japan Railway Company
- Operator: West Japan Railway Company
- Line: Z Fukuen Line
- Distance: 6.1 km (3.8 miles) from Fukuyama
- Platforms: 2 side platforms
- Tracks: 2
- Connections: Bus stop

Construction
- Structure type: Ground level
- Accessible: Yes

Other information
- Status: Unstaffed
- Website: Official website

History
- Opened: 21 July 1914

Passengers
- FY2019: 901 daily

Services
Preceding station	JR West	Following station
Kannabe towards Miyoshi	Fukuen Line Local	Bingo-Honjō towards Fukuyama
Location
- Location within Hiroshima Prefecture Location within Japan

Yokoo Station (横尾駅, Yokoo-eki) is a passenger railway station located in the city of Fukuyama, Hiroshima Prefecture, Japan. It is operated by the West Japan Railway Company (JR West).

== Lines ==
Yokoo Station is served by the JR West Fukuen Line, and is located 6.1 kilometers from the terminus of the line at Fukuyama.

== Station layout ==
The station consists of two parallel side platforms connected to the station building by a footbridge. The former station building was used as the Yokoo Town Community Center until the end of the 1980s, but it was dismantled when the community center was remodeled into the current one near the station. It also originally had an island platform; however, the width was too narrow, so a second platform was constructed by the station entrance, resulting in the current configuration. The station is unattended.

=== Platforms ===
1	■ Z Fukuen Line	for Fukuyama
2	■ Z Fukuen Line	for Kannabe and Fuchū

== History ==
Yokoo Station was opened on 21 July 1914. With the privatization of the Japanese National Railways (JNR) on 1 April 1987, the station came under the control of JR West.

== Passenger statistics ==
In fiscal 2019, the station was used by an average of 901 passengers daily.

== Surrounding area ==
- Eishin Junior and Senior High School
- Sanyo Expressway - Senda Bus Stop
- Japan National Route 313

== See also ==
- List of railway stations in Japan
