= Yuno Station =

Railway station in Fukuyama, Hiroshima Prefecture, Japan

Yuno Station 湯野駅
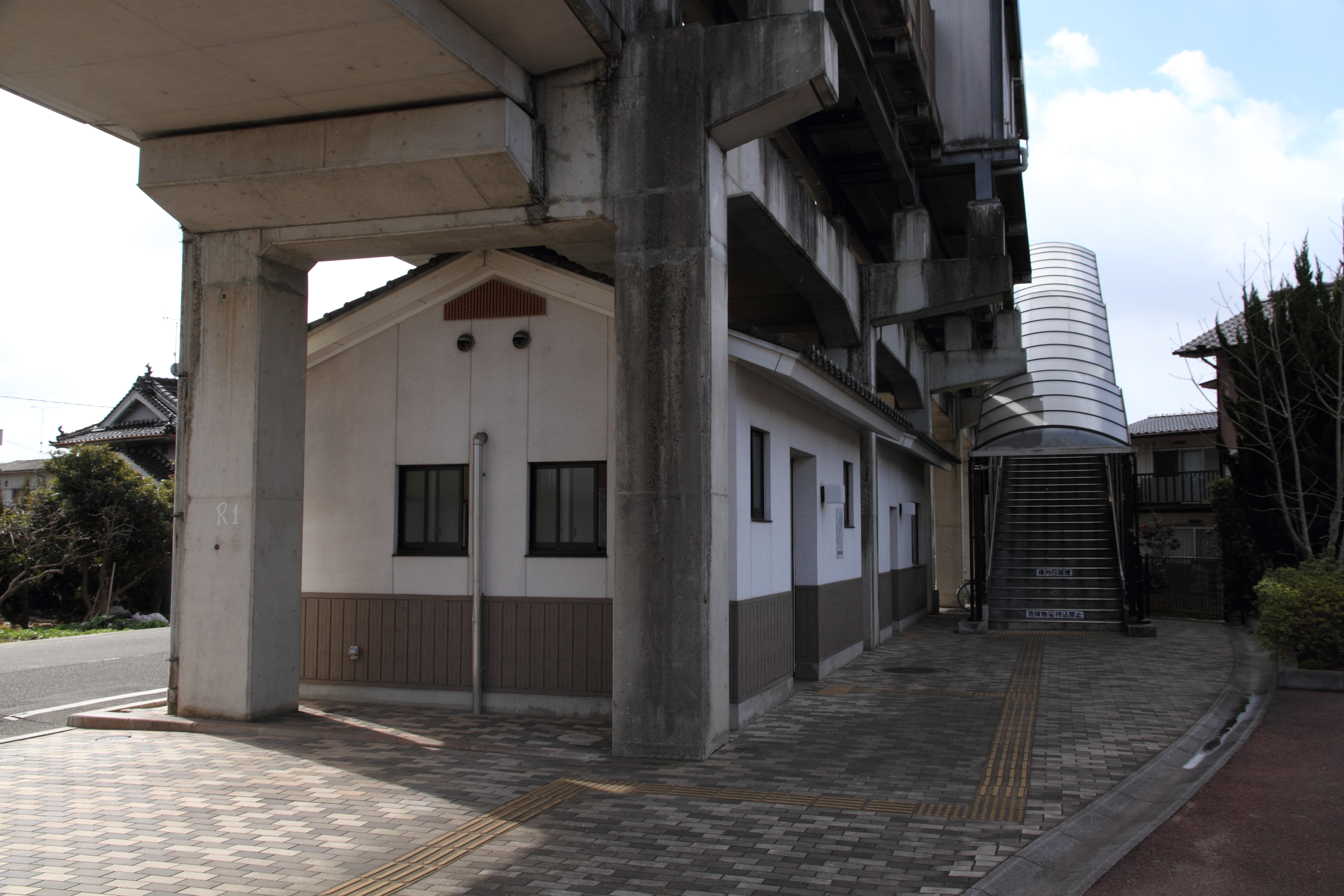
- Yuno Station, February 2022

General information
- Location: Yuno Kannabechō, Fukuyama-shi, Hiroshima-ken 720-2117; Japan
- Coordinates: 34°33′10.45″N 133°23′13.24″E
- Operator: Ibara Railway Company
- Line: ■ Ibara Line
- Distance: 39.5 km (24.5 miles) from Sōja
- Platforms: 1 side platform
- Tracks: 1

Other information
- Status: Unstaffed
- Website: Official website

History
- Opened: 11 January 1999

Passengers
- 2018: 132 daily
Location
- Location within Hiroshima Prefecture Location within Japan

Yuno Miles Station (湯野駅, Yuno-eki) is a passenger railway station located in the city of Fukuyama, Hiroshima Prefecture, Japan. It is operated by the third sector transportation company, Ibara Railway Company).

== Lines ==
Yuno Station is served by the Ibara Line, and is located 39.5 kilometers from the terminus of the line at Sōja.

== Station layout ==
The station consists of one elevated side platform with at the station facilities underneath. The station is unattended.

== Adjacent stations ==
«	Service	»
Ibara Railway
Ibara Line
Goryō	-	Kannabe

== History ==
Yuno Station was opened on January 11, 1999 with the opening of the Ibara Line.

== Passenger statistics ==
In fiscal 2018, the station was used by an average of 132 passengers daily.

== Surrounding area ==
- Fukuyama Municipal Hospital Kannabe Hospital
- Fukuyama Municipal Sugayama Memorial Hall
- Fukuyama City Kannabe Junior High School
- Japan National Route 313

== See also ==
- List of railway stations in Japan
