= Yakage, Okayama =

Yakage 矢掛町
- Town
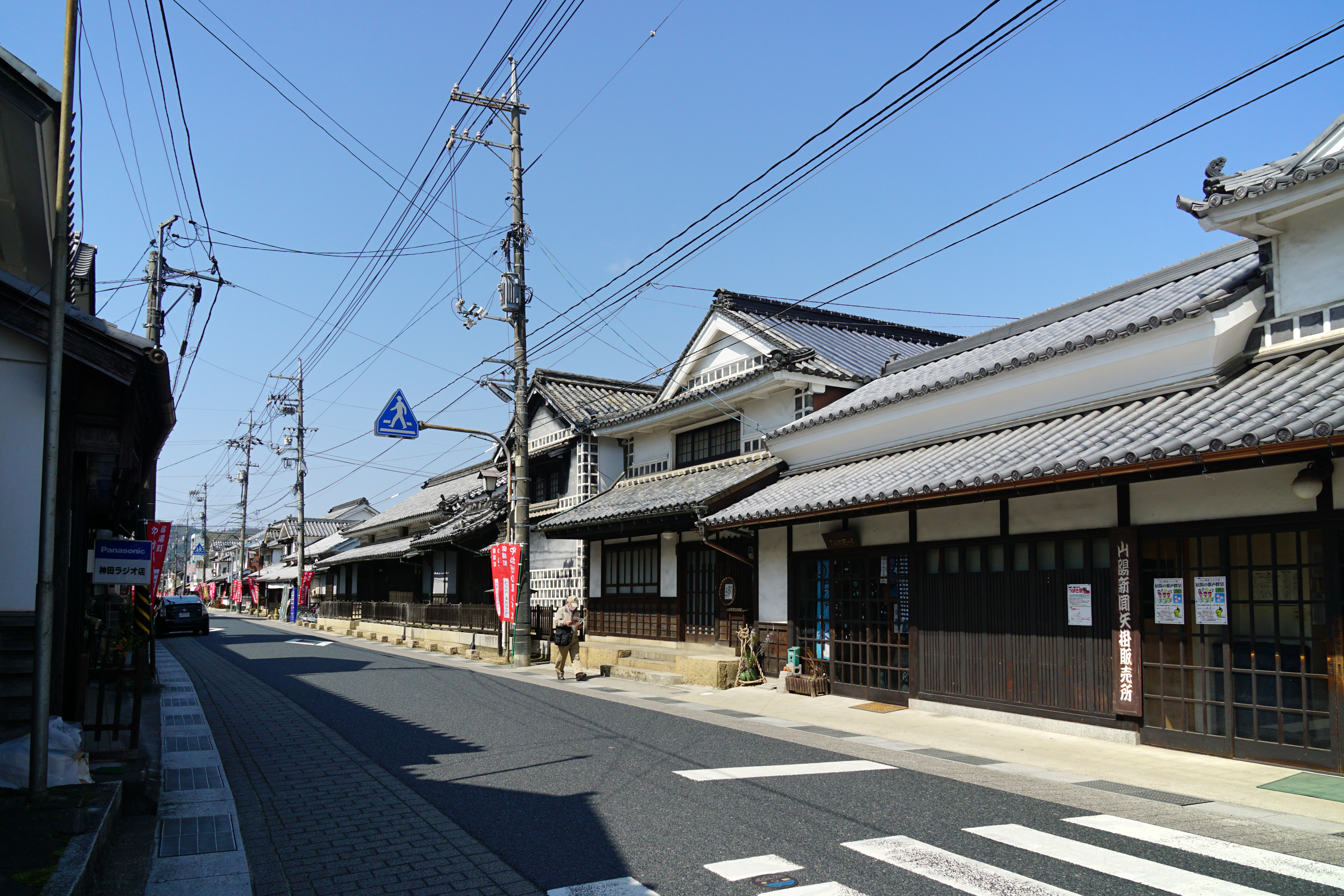
- Yakage-juku

- Flag Seal
- Location of Yakage in Okayama Prefecture

- Location in Japan
- Coordinates: 34°37′39″N 133°35′14″E
- Country: Japan
- Region: Chūgoku; San'yō
- Prefecture: Okayama Prefecture
- District: Oda

Area
  - Total: 90.62 km^{2} (34.99 sq mi)

Population (March 1, 2023)
  - Total: 13,418
  - Density: 148.1/km^{2} (383.5/sq mi)
- Time zone: UTC+09:00 (JST)
- City hall address: 3018 Yakage, Yakage-cho, Oda-gun, Okayama-ken 714-1297
- Website: Official website
- Symbols
- Bird: Japanese bush warbler
- Flower: Sakura
- Tree: Japanese red pine

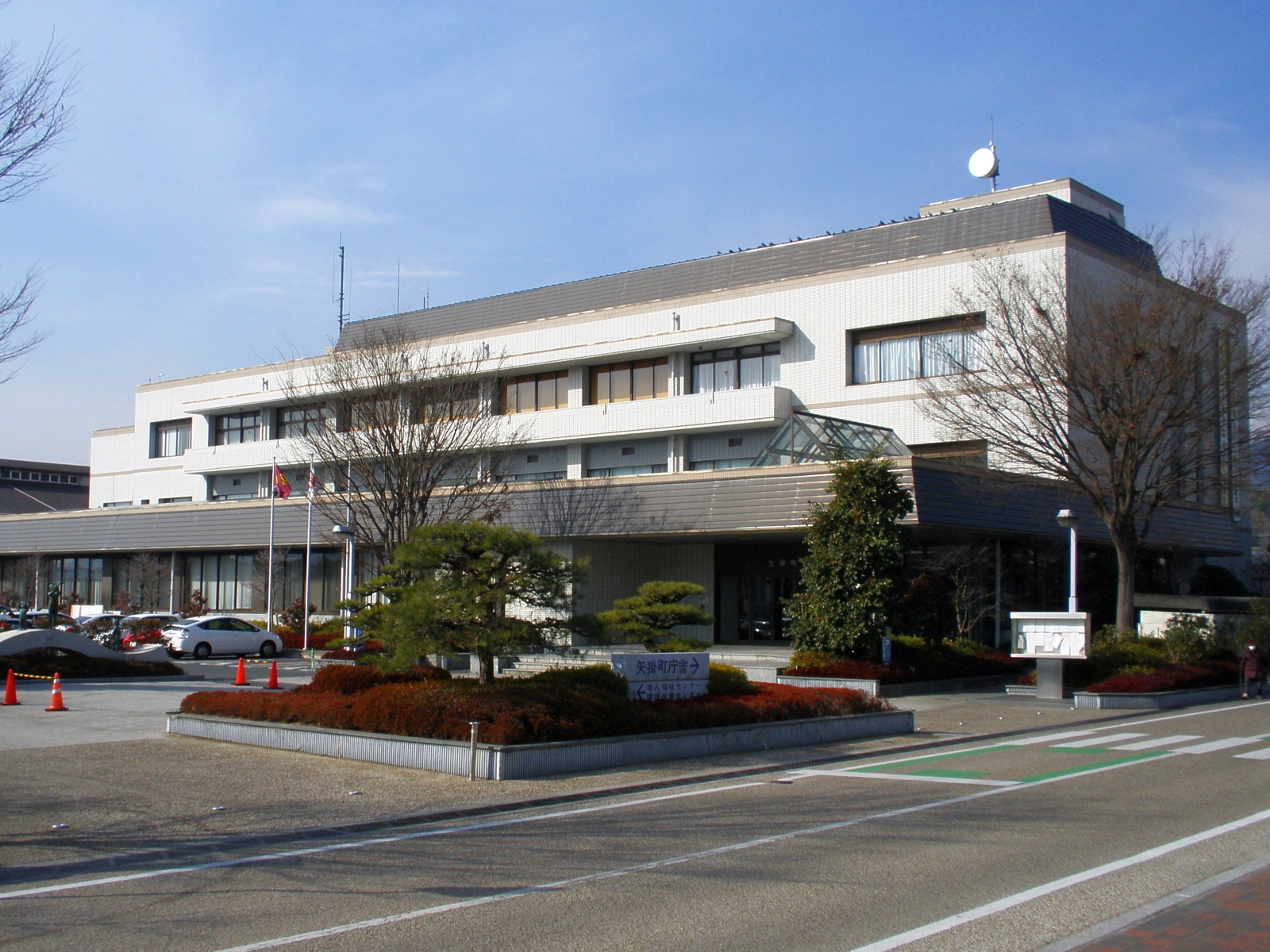
Yakage Town Hall

Yakage (矢掛町, Yakage-chō) is a town located in Oda District, Okayama Prefecture, Japan. As of 1 March 2023, the town had an estimated population of 13,418 in 5445 households and a population density of 150 persons per km^{2}. The total area of the town is 90.62 square kilometres (34.99 sq mi).

== Geography ==
Yakage is located in southwestern Okayama. About half of the town's area(in the north) is occupied by hills and mountains; most of the population is concentrated in the plains in the south.

=== Neighbouring municipalities ===
Okayama Prefecture

- Asakuchi
- Ibara
- Kasaoka
- Kurashiki
- Sōja

== Climate ==
Yakage has a humid subtropical climate (Köppen Cfa) characterized by warm summers and cool winters with moderate snowfall. The average annual temperature in Yakage is 15.6 °C. The average annual rainfall is 1493 mm with September as the wettest month. The temperatures are highest on average in January, at around 27.1 °C, and lowest in January, at around 4.9 °C.

== Demography ==
Per Japanese census data, the population of Yakage has been as follows. The population has been decreasing since the 1950s.

Historical population
Year	Pop.	±%
1920	20,447	—
1930	20,490	+0.2%
1940	19,600	−4.3%
1950	24,113	+23.0%
1960	21,960	−8.9%
1970	18,665	−15.0%
1980	18,400	−1.4%
1990	17,306	−5.9%
2000	16,230	−6.2%
2010	15,094	−7.0%

== History ==
The area of Yakage was part of ancient Bitchū Province. Yakage was a former post station along the San'yōdō highway, and during the Edo period was part of Niwase Domain. The village of Yakage was established on June 1, 1889, with the creation of the modern municipalities system. It was raised to town status on February 26, 1896. Yakage annexed the five neighboring village of Mikawa, Mitani, Yamada, Kawamo, and Nakagawa on May 1, 1954. On January 15, 1961, Yakage annexed the village of Oda.

== Government ==
Yakage has a mayor-council form of government with a directly elected mayor and a unicameral town council of 12 members. Yakage, collectively with the city of Ibara, contributes two members to the Okayama Prefectural Assembly. In terms of national politics, the town is part of the Okayama 3rd district of the lower house of the Diet of Japan.

== Economy ==
The main industry is agriculture, but recently, commerce and tourism are also increasing. In terms of agriculture, rice is the main crop, but many fruits such as grapes, pears and figs are also grown.

== Education ==
Yakage has seven public elementary schools and one public junior high school operated by the town government, in addition to one public high school operated by the Okayama Prefectural Board of Education.

== Transportation ==
=== Railway ===
Ibara Railway Company - Ibara Line

- Mitani - Yakage - Oda

=== Highways ===
- National Route 486

== Local attractions ==
- Yakage old town. A samurai parade (大名行列) is held every November in commemoration of the town's history as a major stopping point for daimyō on sankin-kōtai.

== Noted people from Yakage ==
- Go Ibuki, Japanese actor
- Okanoyama Yoshiro, sumo wrestler
