= Ibara Line =

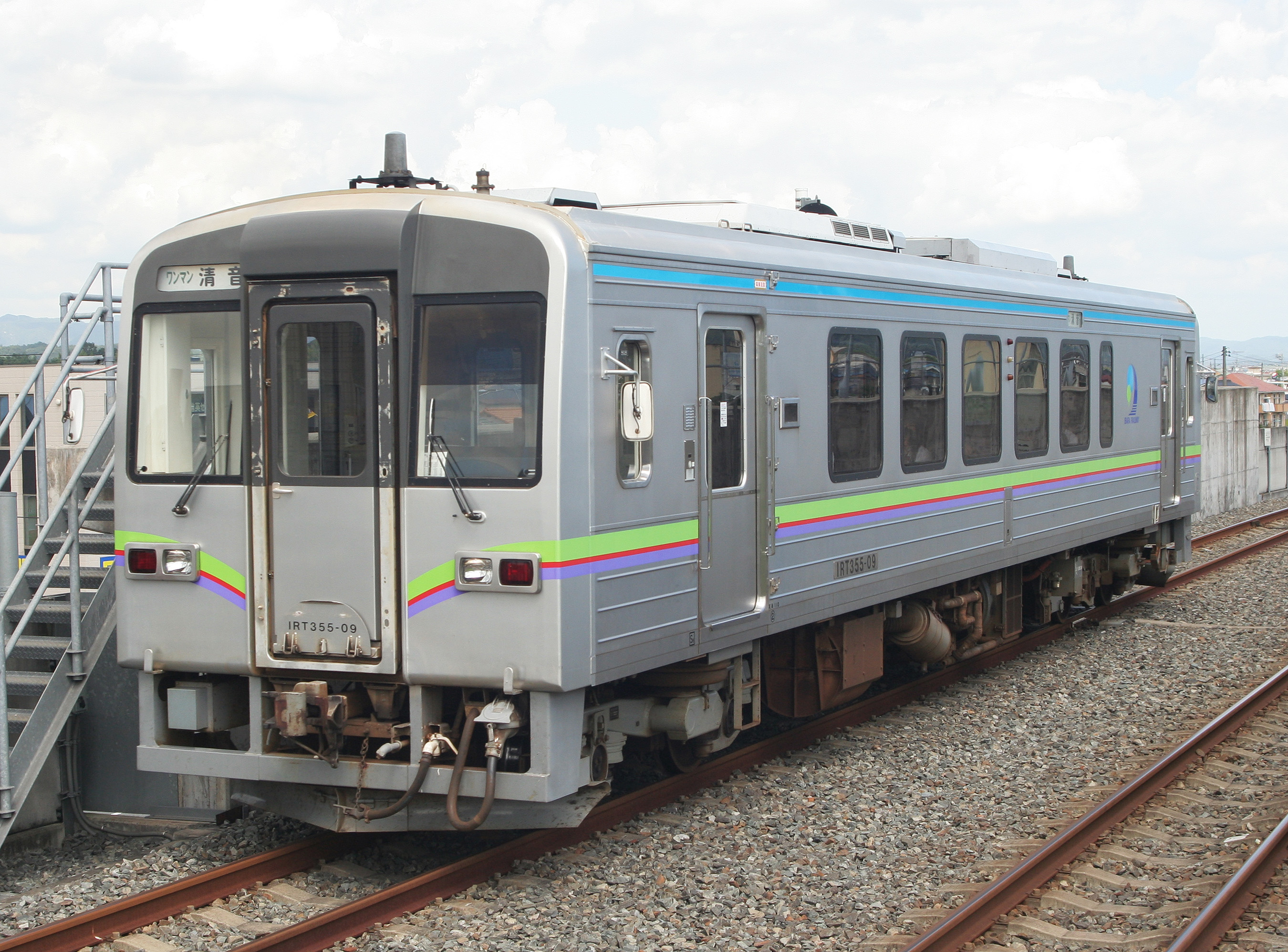
- Ibara Railway IRT 355 Series DMU

Overview
- Status: Operational
- Owner: Ibara Tetsudo
- Locale: Okayama Prefecture; Hiroshima Prefecture
- Termini: Sōja; Kannabe
- Stations: 15

Service
- Operator: Ibara Tetsudo

History
- Opened: 11 January 1999; 27 years ago

Technical
- Line length: 41.7 km (25.9 mi)
- Number of tracks: 1
- Character: Rural
- Track gauge: 1,067 mm (3 ft 6 in)
- Electrification: None
- Operating speed: 95 km/h (60 mph)

The Ibara Line (井原線, Ibara-sen) is a Japanese railway line between Sōja Station, Sōja and Kannabe Station, Fukuyama. It is the only railway line operated by the Ibara Railway (井原鉄道, Ibara Tetsudō).

== History ==
Japanese National Railways started the construction of the line in 1966, but financial constraints halted work in 1980. The Ibara Railway Co. was established in 1986 and construction resumed under the newly founded third-sector railway company. The line opened on January 11, 1999, dual track and electrified as far as Kiyone.

== Basic data ==
- Operators, distances: Sōja — Kannabe; 41.7 km / 25.9 mi.
  - Ibara Railway (Category-1)
    - Kiyone — Kannabe: 38.3 km / 23.8 mi.
  - Ibara Railway (Category-2), West Japan Railway Company (Category-1), Japan Freight Railway Company (Category-2)
    - Sōja — Kiyone: 3.4 km / 2.1 mi. (Shared with Hakubi Line.)
- Gauge: 1,067 mm / 3 ft. 6 in.
- Stations: 15
- Double-track line: Sōja — Kiyone
- Electric supply: Sōja — Kiyone (1500 V DC)
  - All the Ibara Railway trains are DMUs.
- Railway signalling
  - Kiyone — Kannabe: Simplified automatic
  - Sōja — Kiyone: Automatic

== Stations ==
| Name | | Distance (km) | Connections | Location | |
|---|---|---|---|---|---|
| Sōja | 総社 | 0.0 | JR West: Hakubi Line・Kibi Line | Okayama | Sōja |
| Kiyone | 清音 | 3.4 | JR West: Hakubi Line | Okayama | Sōja |
| Kawabejuku | 川辺宿 | 6.0 | | Okayama | Kurashiki |
| Kibinomakibi | 吉備真備 | 8.2 | | Okayama | Kurashiki |
| Bitchū-Kurese | 備中呉妹 | 11.1 | | Okayama | Kurashiki |
| Mitani | 三谷 | 15.1 | | Okayama | Yakage, Oda District |
| Yakage | 矢掛 | 18.2 | | Okayama | Yakage, Oda District |
| Oda | 小田 | 23.4 | | Okayama | Yakage, Oda District |
| Sōunnosato-Ebara | 早雲の里荏原 | 26.8 | | Okayama | Ibara |
| Ibara | 井原 | 30.5 | | Okayama | Ibara |
| Izue | いずえ | 32.3 | | Okayama | Ibara |
| Komoriutanosato-Takaya | 子守唄の里高屋 | 34.1 | | Okayama | Ibara |
| Goryō | 御領 | 37.6 | | Hiroshima | Fukuyama |
| Yuno | 湯野 | 39.5 | | Hiroshima | Fukuyama |
| Kannabe | 神辺 | 41.7 | JR West: Fukuen Line | Hiroshima | Fukuyama |

== See also ==
- List of railway companies in Japan
- List of railway lines in Japan
