= Okanoyama Yoshiro =

Japanese sumo wrestler

Personal information
- Native name: 岡ノ山 喜郎
- Born: Kiichiro Yamabe; 3 November 1935 (age 90) Yakage, Okayama, Japan
- Height: 1.85 m (6 ft 1 in)
- Weight: 112 kg (247 lb)

Sport
- Sport: Sumo
- Retired: January, 1965
- Heya: Tokitsukaze
- Record: 269-229-37
- Debut: May, 1955
- Highest rank: Maegashira 5 (May, 1962)
- Championships: 1 (Jūryō); 1 (Makushita)
- Updated on Sep. 2012

Okanoyama Yoshiro (born 3 November 1935 as Kiichiro Yamabe) is a former sumo wrestler from Yakage, Okayama, Japan. He made his professional debut in May 1955 and reached the top division in March 1962. His highest rank was maegashira 5. He left the sumo world upon retirement from active competition in January 1965.

== Career record ==
- The Kyushu tournament was first held in 1957, and the Nagoya tournament in 1958.

Okanoyama Yoshiro
Year	January Hatsu basho, Tokyo	March Haru basho, Osaka	May Natsu basho, Tokyo	July Nagoya basho, Nagoya	September Aki basho, Tokyo	November Kyūshū basho, Fukuoka
1955	x	x	Shinjo; 3–0	Not held	West Jonidan #72; 5–3	Not held
1956	West Jonidan #39; 5–3	East Jonidan #9; 4–4	West Sandanme #96; 7–1	Not held	East Sandanme #52; 5–3	Not held
1957	East Sandanme #39; 4–4	East Sandanme #38; 2–6	West Sandanme #50; 3–5	Not held	East Sandanme #50; 5–3	West Sandanme #31; 4–4
1958	East Sandanme #30; 5–3	East Sandanme #19; 3–5	East Sandanme #23; 5–3	West Sandanme #8; 7–1	West Makushita #68; 3–5	East Makushita #78; 3–5
1959	West Makushita #83; 7–1	West Makushita #53; 5–3	West Makushita #49; 4–4	East Makushita #47; 4–4	East Makushita #47; 5–3	East Makushita #36; 4–4
1960	East Makushita #37; 2–6	East Makushita #44; 3–1–4	West Makushita #43; 5–3	West Makushita #35; 5–2	East Makushita #27; 5–2	West Makushita #18; 5–2
1961	West Makushita #11; 4–3	East Makushita #7; 5–2	West Makushita #3; 7–0; Champion	West Jūryō #14; 10–5	East Jūryō #5; 9–4–2	West Jūryō #1; 5–10
1962	East Jūryō #5; 11–4	East Maegashira #14; 9–6	East Maegashira #5; 0–6–9	West Maegashira #14; 3–12	West Jūryō #4; 7–8	East Jūryō #5; 14–1; Champion
1963	East Maegashira #12; 6–9	West Maegashira #14; 5–10	East Jūryō #4; 7–8	East Jūryō #5; 6–9	West Jūryō #7; 5–10	West Jūryō #14; 8–7
1964	West Jūryō #8; 6–9	East Jūryō #12; Sat out due to injury 0–0–15	East Makushita #7; Sat out due to injury 0–0–7	East Makushita #47; 3–4	West Makushita #55; 6–1	West Makushita #28; 4–3
1965	East Makushita #26; Retired; 2–5–0					
Record given as wins–losses–absences Top division champion Top division runner-up Retired Lower divisions Non-participation Sanshō key: F=Fighting spirit; O=Outstanding performance; T=Technique Also shown: ★=Kinboshi; P=Playoff(s); Divisions: Makuuchi — Jūryō — Makushita — Sandanme — Jonidan — Jonokuchi Makuuchi ranks: Yokozuna — Ōzeki — Sekiwake — Komusubi — Maegashira

== See also ==
- Glossary of sumo terms
- List of past sumo wrestlers
- List of sumo tournament second division champions
