= Anzen Station =

Railway station in Yokohama, Japan

JI06 Anzen Station 安善駅
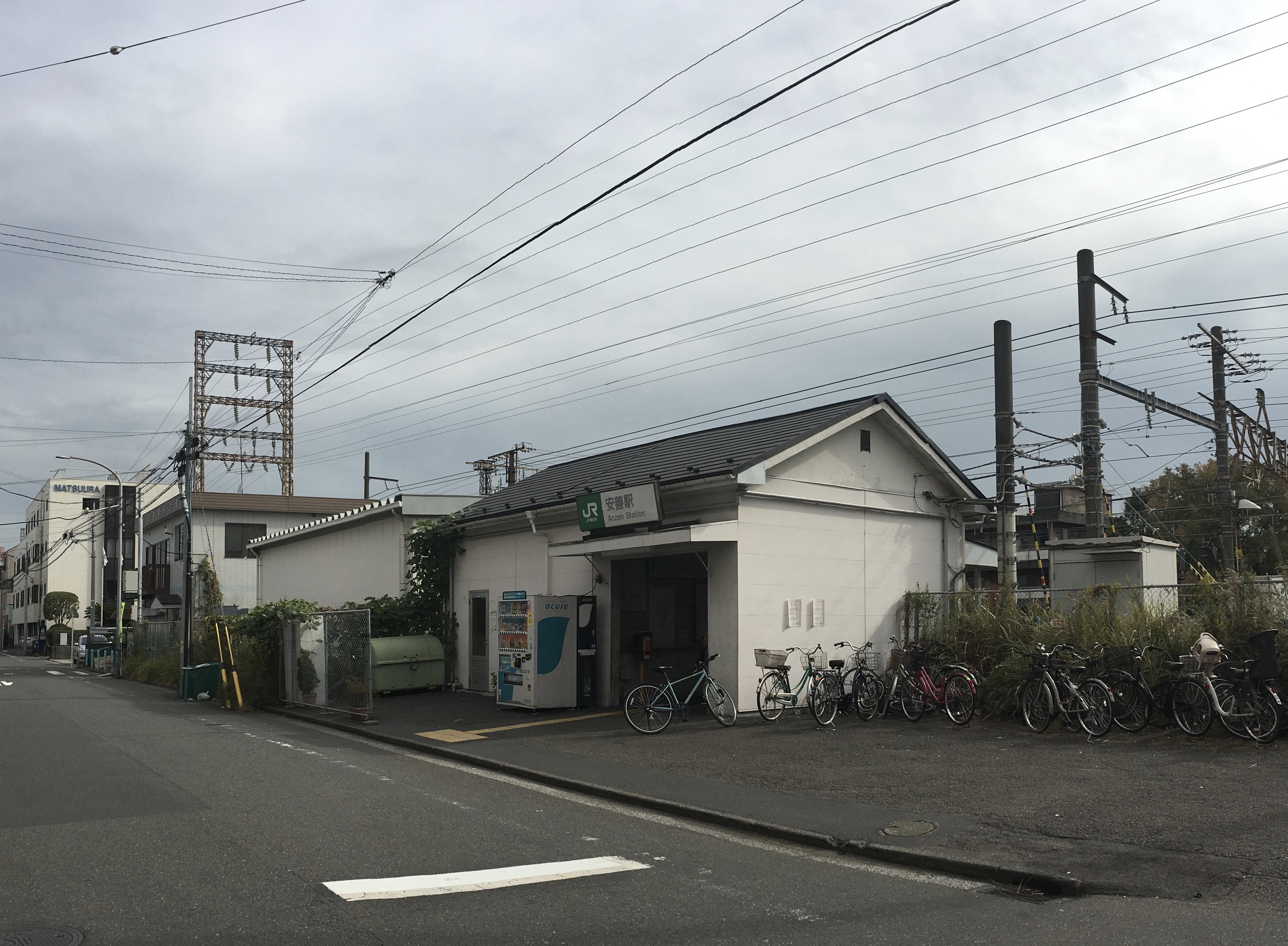
- Anzen Station, November 2022

General information
- Location: Anzenchō 1-chōme, Tsurumi, Yokohama, Kanagawa （横浜市鶴見区安善町1丁目） Japan
- Coordinates: 35°29′58.8″N 139°42′2.4″E
- Operator: JR East
- Line: Tsurumi Line

History
- Opened: 10 March 1926; 100 years ago
- Former names: Anzendōri (until 1943)

Passengers
- 2006: 1,132 daily

Services
Preceding station	JR East	Following station
Asano JI05 towards Tsurumi	Tsurumi Line Main Line	Musashi-Shiraishi JI07 towards Ōgimachi
Asano JI05 towards Tsurumi	Tsurumi Line Ōkawa branch	Ōkawa JI61 Terminus
Location
- Location within Kanagawa Prefecture Location within Japan

Anzen Station (安善駅, Anzen-eki) is a railway station operated by East Japan Railway Company (JR East) in Tsurumi-ku, Yokohama, Kanagawa Prefecture, Japan.

== Lines ==
Anzen Station is served by the Tsurumi Line, and is 3.5 kilometers (2.2 mi) from the terminus at Tsurumi Station.

== Station layout ==
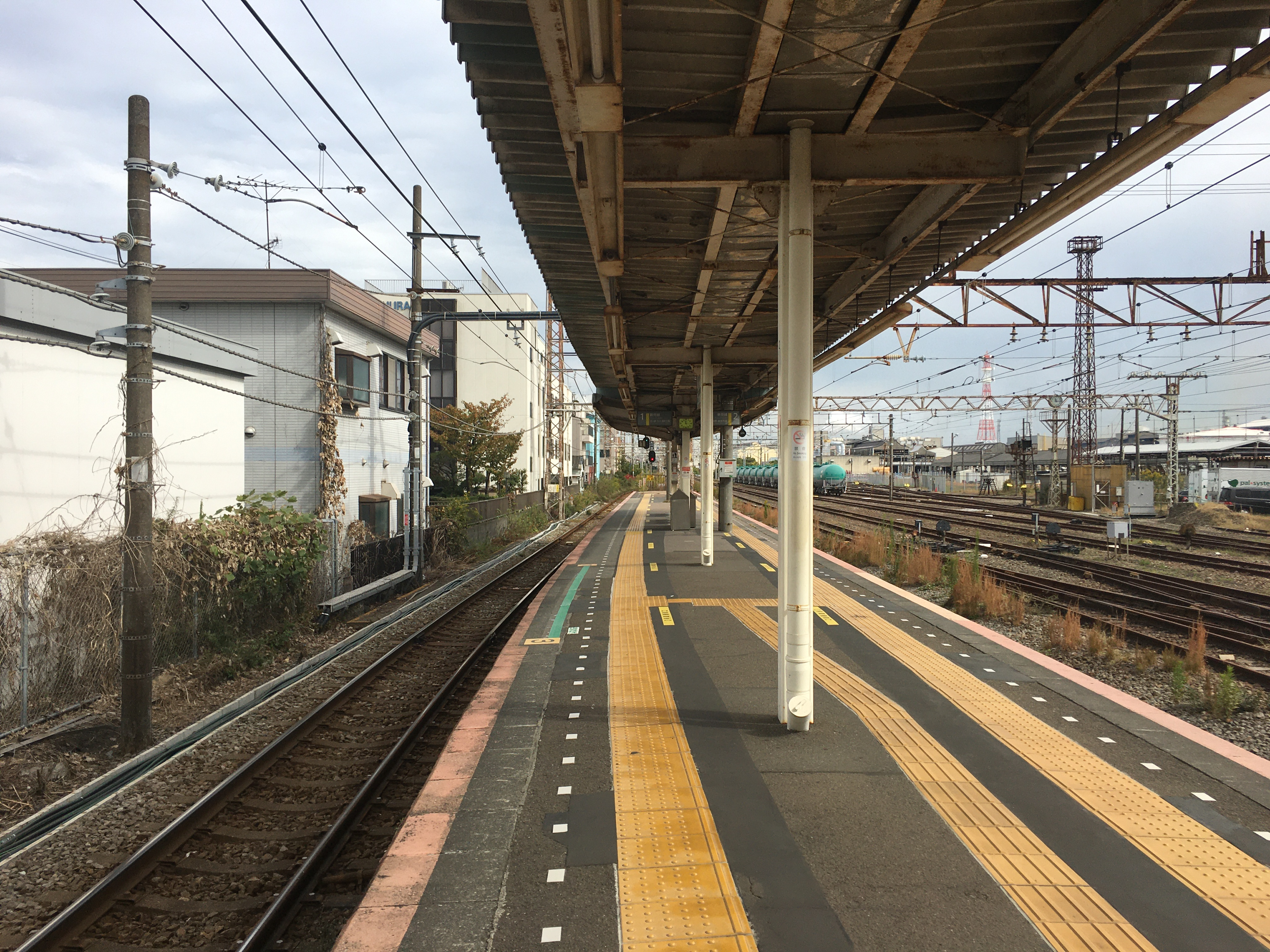
Station platforms, November 2022

Anzen Station has an island platform serving two tracks.

=== Platforms ===
1	Tsurumi Line (Main Line)	for Hama-Kawasaki, Ōgimachi
1	Tsurumi Line (Ōkawa Branch)	for Ōkawa
2	Tsurumi Line	for Bentembashi and Tsurumi

== History ==
Anzen Station was opened on 10 March 1926, as Anzenmachi Station (安善町駅, Anzenmachi-eki) on the privately held Tsurumi Rinkō Railway (鶴見臨港鉄道, Tsurumi Rinkō Tetsudō) initially for freight operations only. A station for passenger services named Anzendōri Station (安善通駅, Anzendōri-eki) was opened on 28 October 1930, adjacent to the freight station. The Tsurumi Rinkō line was nationalized on 1 July 1943, at which time the two stations were unified under its present name, and was later absorbed into the Japan National Railways (JNR) network. The station has been unstaffed since 1 March 1971. Upon the privatization of the JNR on 1 April 1987, the station has been operated by JR East.

== Surrounding area ==
- US Navy Tsurumi Fuel Terminal
