= Yuno (musician) =

American musician

- Born: The Bronx, New York, U.S.
- Origin: Jacksonville, Florida, U.S.
- Genres: Indie pop; bedroom pop; dream pop
- Occupations: Musician; singer-songwriter; record producer
- Years active: 2010–present
- Label: Sub Pop

Yuno is an American musician, singer-songwriter, and record producer based in Brooklyn, New York, and signed to Sub Pop Records. He writes, produces, and performs most of his music alone, usually from a home studio. His 2018 single "No Going Back" was named a Pitchfork "Best New Track" and later turned up in the Netflix film The Perfect Date. He released his debut full-length album, Blest, in 2025.

== Early life ==
Yuno was born in the Bronx, New York, to Jamaican parents from the United Kingdom, and moved to Jacksonville, Florida, at nine months old, where he grew up. He taught himself guitar from tabs he found online rather than through formal lessons, and has pointed to Jacksonville's skateboarding scene as one of the biggest early influences on what he listened to.

== Career ==
=== 2010–2017: Early releases ===
Yuno started posting music to Bandcamp and SoundCloud on his own in 2010, recording out of his bedroom in Jacksonville. Ishmael Butler of Shabazz Palaces and Digable Planets, who was doing A&R work for Sub Pop at the time, came across his SoundCloud page and eventually brought him to the label.

=== 2018: Moodie and "No Going Back" ===
Sub Pop signed Yuno in February 2018, and he released "No Going Back" along with a music video he directed and starred in himself. Pitchfork gave the track a "Best New Track" nod. and later reviewed the Moodie EP as well. NPR Music picked the song for its "All Songs Considered" roundup that February, calling it an early contender for song of the summer.

His debut EP, Moodie, followed on June 15, 2018, on Sub Pop — six tracks, all written, performed, and produced by Yuno himself. Loud and Quiet called it "a bold opening statement," and Exclaim! pointed to the "remarkable skill" behind music made almost entirely in a bedroom. Earbuddy and a handful of other outlets reviewed it too.

That spring, Yuno opened for Twin Shadow on a run of U.S. dates that took him through San Francisco, Portland, Seattle, and Washington, D.C., closing with a show at the Music Hall of Williamsburg in Brooklyn. That August and September, he toured the U.S. and Canada supporting Superorganism, with dates including Portland, Vancouver, Chicago, Brooklyn, and Austin. That November, he toured Europe supporting Unknown Mortal Orchestra, with stops including Antwerp, Frankfurt, Amsterdam, Berlin, Copenhagen, Stockholm, Vienna, and London, closing the run in Glasgow. A year later, "No Going Back" and "Sunlight" both showed up in the Netflix film The Perfect Date, and "Sunlight" was separately used in an episode of the Netflix series Atypical; "Fall in Love" was later featured in comedian Ramy Youssef's HBO special Feelings.

=== 2020–2024: "Somebody" and continued work ===
Yuno didn't put out new recorded material again until 2020's "Somebody," his first release since Moodie.

=== 2025: Blest ===
Blest, Yuno's first full-length album, came out May 16, 2025, on Sub Pop. He wrote and performed all ten tracks himself, co-producing with Frank Corr, with Patrick Wimberly of Chairlift and Nick Sanborn of Sylvan Esso contributing additional production. Glide Magazine described the record as Yuno "expanding the scope of his sound, embracing pop grandiosity and exploring vocal styles" in its review.

He played NonCommvention in Philadelphia that May and followed the album with a headline tour, including a hometown release show at Baby's All Right in Brooklyn.

=== Video game soundtracks ===
Songs from Blest have since turned up in several video game soundtracks. "Gimme Ocean" plays on the Sub Pop Records radio station in Forza Horizon 6 and also appears on the EA Sports FC 26 soundtrack, which features more than 100 songs total. A Simlish version of "Unfair" has also appeared in The Sims.

== Musical style ==
Critics have described Yuno's sound as a mix of indie pop, dream pop, R&B, and trap, drawing comparisons to Tame Impala, Frank Ocean, and Animal Collective. Most of what he releases is written, recorded, and produced by him alone at home; he also directs his own videos and shoots his own press photos.

== Personal life ==
Yuno lives in Brooklyn, New York.

== Discography ==
=== EPs ===
- Moodie (2018)

=== Albums ===
- Blest (2025)
