= Kiyone Station =

Railway station in Sōja, Okayama Prefecture, Japan

Kiyone Station 清音駅
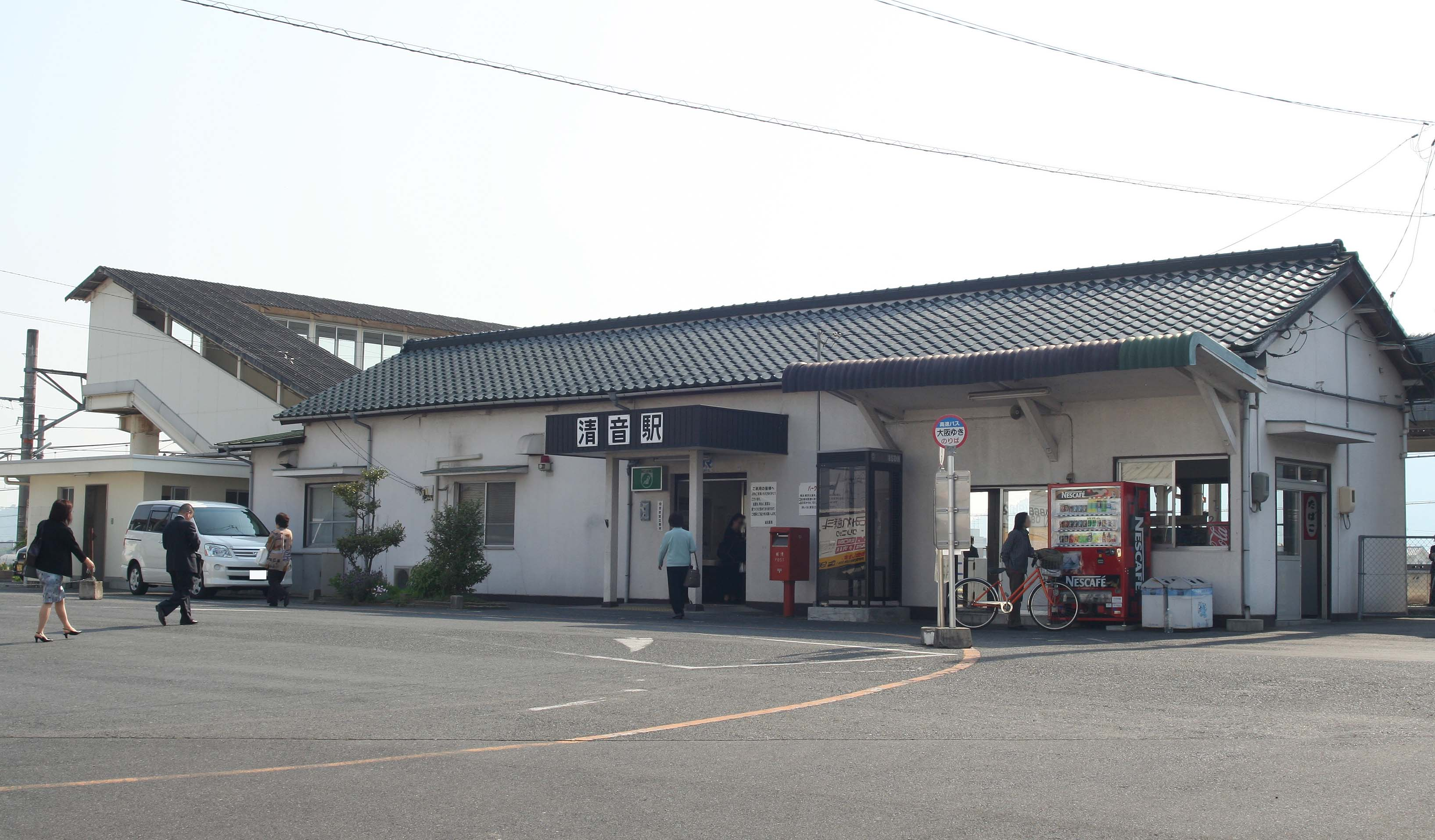
- Kiyone Station in December 2009

General information
- Location: Kiyonekaminakashima, Sōja-shi, Okayama-ken 19-1175; Japan
- Coordinates: 34°38′37.12″N 133°43′59.98″E
- Operator: JR West; Ibara Railway Company
- Lines: V Hakubi Line; ■ Ibara Line
- Distance: 7.3 km (4.5 miles) from Kurashiki
- Platforms: 1 side + 1 island platforms

Other information
- Status: Staffed (Ibara Railway portion only)
- Station code: JR-V06
- Website: Official website

History
- Opened: 17 February 1925

Passengers
- 2019: 1650 daily
Location
- Location within Okayama Prefecture Location within Japan

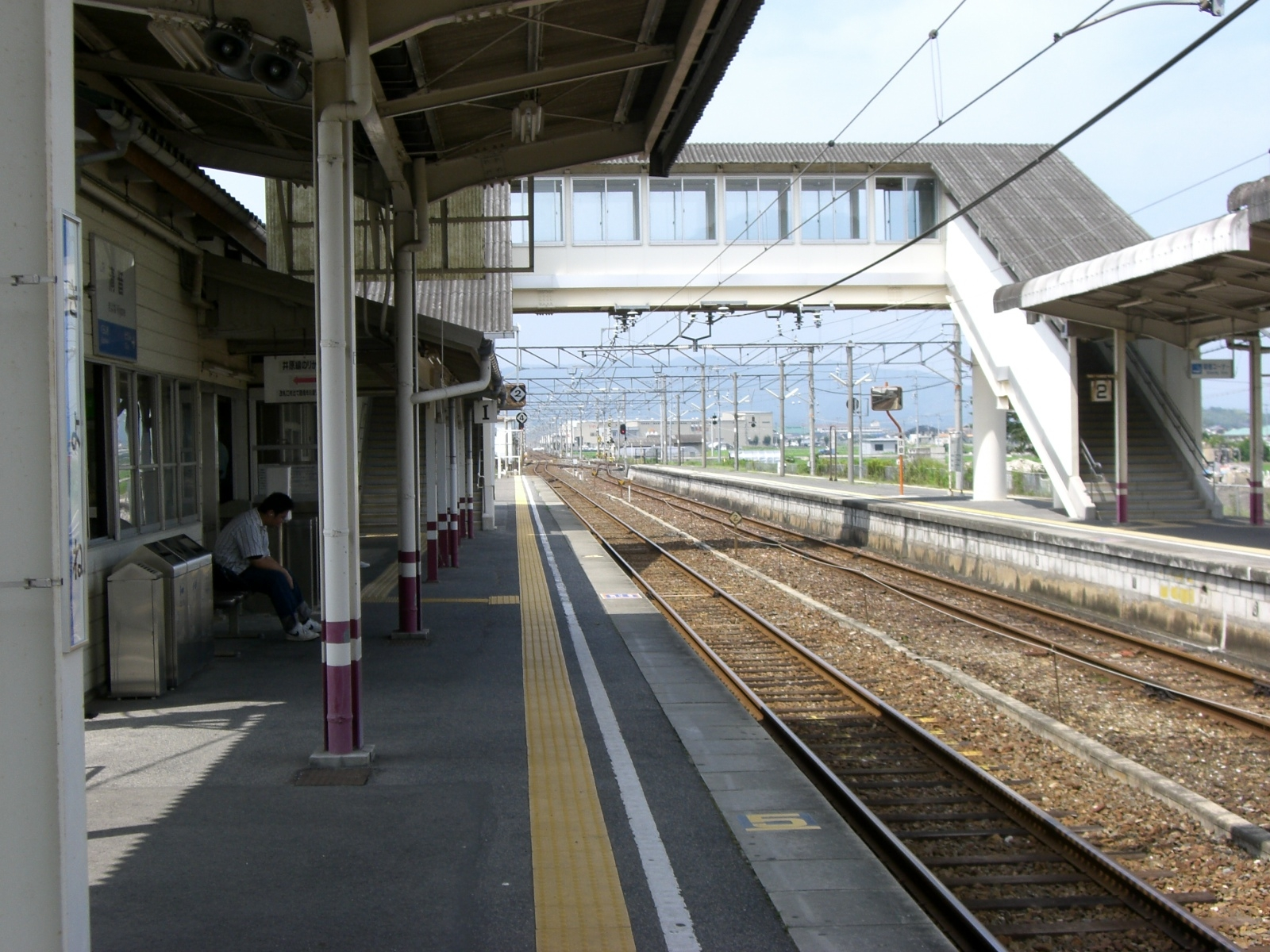
Kiyone Station looking toward Bitchū-Takahashi Station in July 2006

Kiyone Station (清音駅, Kiyone-eki) is a passenger railway station located in the city of Sōja, Okayama Prefecture, Japan. It is jointly operated by the West Japan Railway Company (JR West) and the third sector transportation company, Ibara Railway Company It is located in the former village of Kiyone, which was merged with the expanded city of Sōja in March 2005.

== Lines ==
Kiyone Station is served by the Hakubi Line, and is located 7.3 km (4.5 mi) from the terminus of the line at Kurashiki and 23.2 km (14.4 mi) from Okayama. It is also served by trains of the Ibara Railway Ibara Line from Kannabe and is 3.4 km (2.1 mi) from the terminus of that line at Sōja.

== Station layout ==
The station consists of a side platform and an island platform, connected by a footbridge. The island platform is shared by JR West and the Ibara Railway, with JR West using the northern portion of the platform and the Ibara Railway using the southern portion. The JR portion of the station is unstaffed.

=== Platforms ===
1	■ V Hakubi Line	for Kurashiki and Okayama
2	■ Ibara Line	for Sōja for Ibara and Kannabe
3	■ V Hakubi Line	for Bitchū-Takahashi and Niimi

== Adjacent stations ==
«	Service	»
Hakubi Line
Kurashiki	Local	Sōja
Ibara Line
Sōja	-	Kawabejuku

== History ==
Kiyone Station was opened on 17 February 1925. With the privatization of Japanese National Railways (JNR) on 1 April 1987, the station came under the control of JR West. With the privatization of the Japan National Railways (JNR) on April 1, 1987, the station came under the aegis of the West Japan Railway Company. The Ibara Railway connected to the station on January 11, 1999.

== Passenger statistics ==
During the fiscal year 2019, the JR portion of the station was used by an average of 1650 passengers daily.

== Surrounding area ==
- Takahashi River
- Japan National Route 486

== See also ==
- List of railway stations in Japan
- Gunma-Sōja Station (on the Joetsu Line in Gunma Prefecture)
