= Ibara Station =

Railway station in Ibara, Okayama Prefecture, Japan

Ibara Station 井原駅
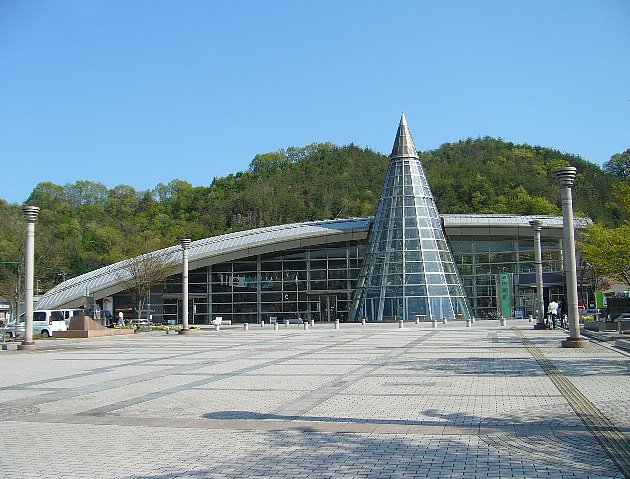
- Ibara Station platform, April 2006

General information
- Location: Nanukaichi-chō, Ibara-shi, Okayama-ken 715-0014; Japan
- Coordinates: 34°35′34.49″N 133°28′8.23″E
- Operator: Ibara Railway Company
- Line: ■ Ibara Line
- Distance: 30.5 km (19.0 miles) from Sōja
- Platforms: 1 island platform
- Tracks: 2

Other information
- Status: Staffed
- Website: Official website

History
- Opened: 11 January 1999

Passengers
- FY2018: 801 daily
Location
- Location within Okayama Prefecture Location within Japan

Ibara Station (井原駅, Ibara-eki) is a passenger railway station located in the city of Ibara, Okayama Prefecture, Japan. It is operated by the third sector transportation company, Ibara Railway Company).

== Lines ==
Ibara Station is served by the Ibara Line, and is located 30.5 kilometers from the terminus of the line at Sōja.

== Station layout ==
The station consists of one island platform connected by a level crossing to the high-ceilinged, glass-enclosed station building. The station building has an automatic ticket vending machine at the ticket gate, as well as shops, restaurants, and a special product display and sales space. In addition, the west side of the ticket gate passage is owned by Ibara Railway, and the east side is owned by Ibara City. The station is staffed.

=== Platforms ===
1	■ Ibara Line	for Kannabe
2	■ Ibara Line	for Kiyone and Sōja

== Adjacent stations ==
«	Service	»
Ibara Railway
Ibara Line
Sōunnosato-Ebara	-	Izue

== History ==
Ibara Station was opened on January 11, 1999 with the opening of the Ibara Line.

== Passenger statistics ==
In fiscal 2018, the station was used by an average of 801 passengers daily.

== Surrounding area ==
- Ibara City Hall
- Denchū Art Museum

== See also ==
- List of railway stations in Japan
