= Japan National Route 486 =

Road in Japan

National Route 486
- 国道486号
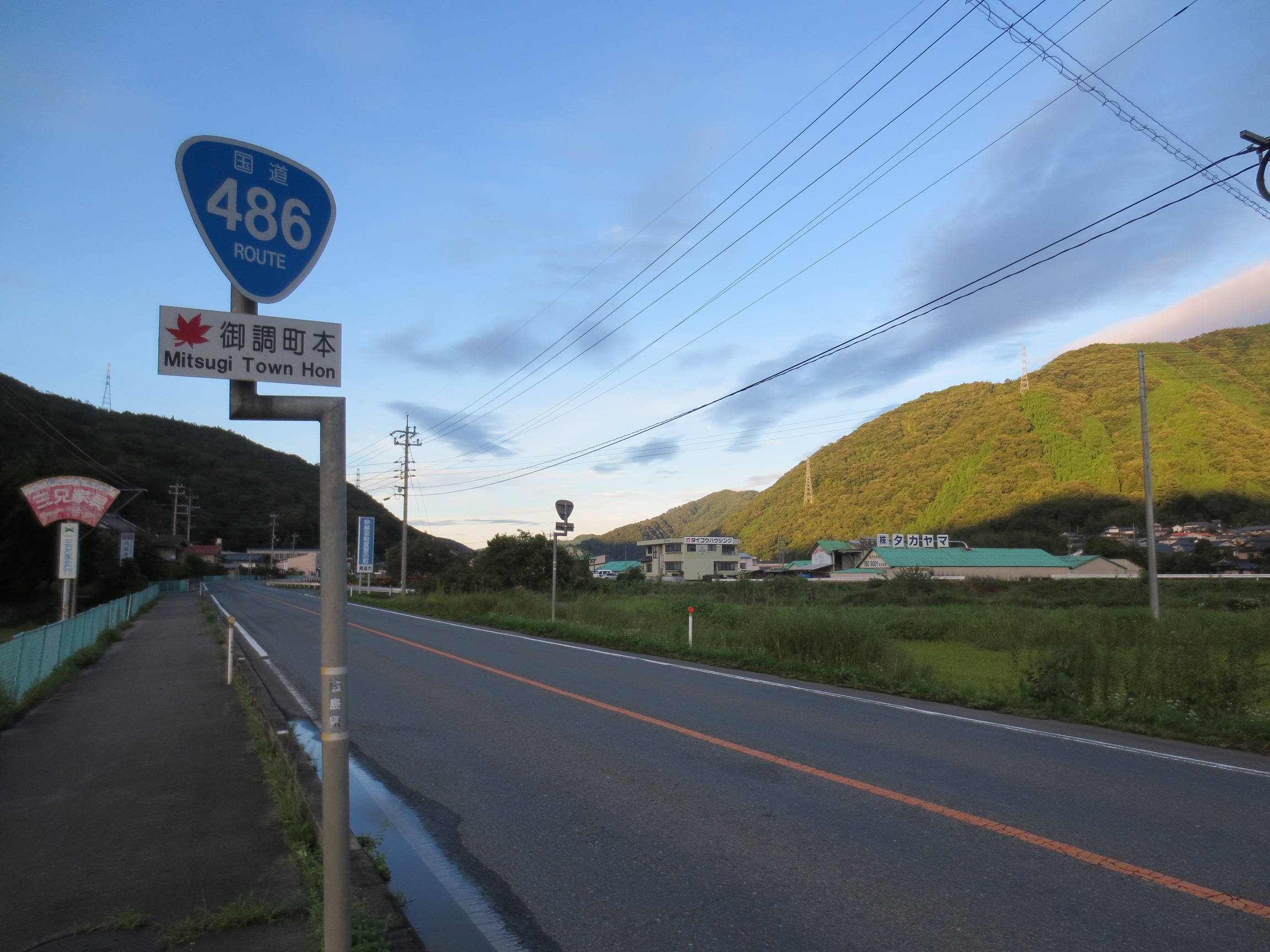

Route information
- Length: 130.8 km (81.3 mi)

Location
- Country: Japan

Highway system
- National highways of Japan; Expressways of Japan
← National Route 485	→ National Route 487

National Route 486 is a national highway of Japan connecting between Sōja, Okayama and Higashihiroshima, Hiroshima in Japan. It has a total length of 130.8 km (81.27 mi).
