= Japan National Route 313 =

National highway in Japan

National Route 313
- 国道313号
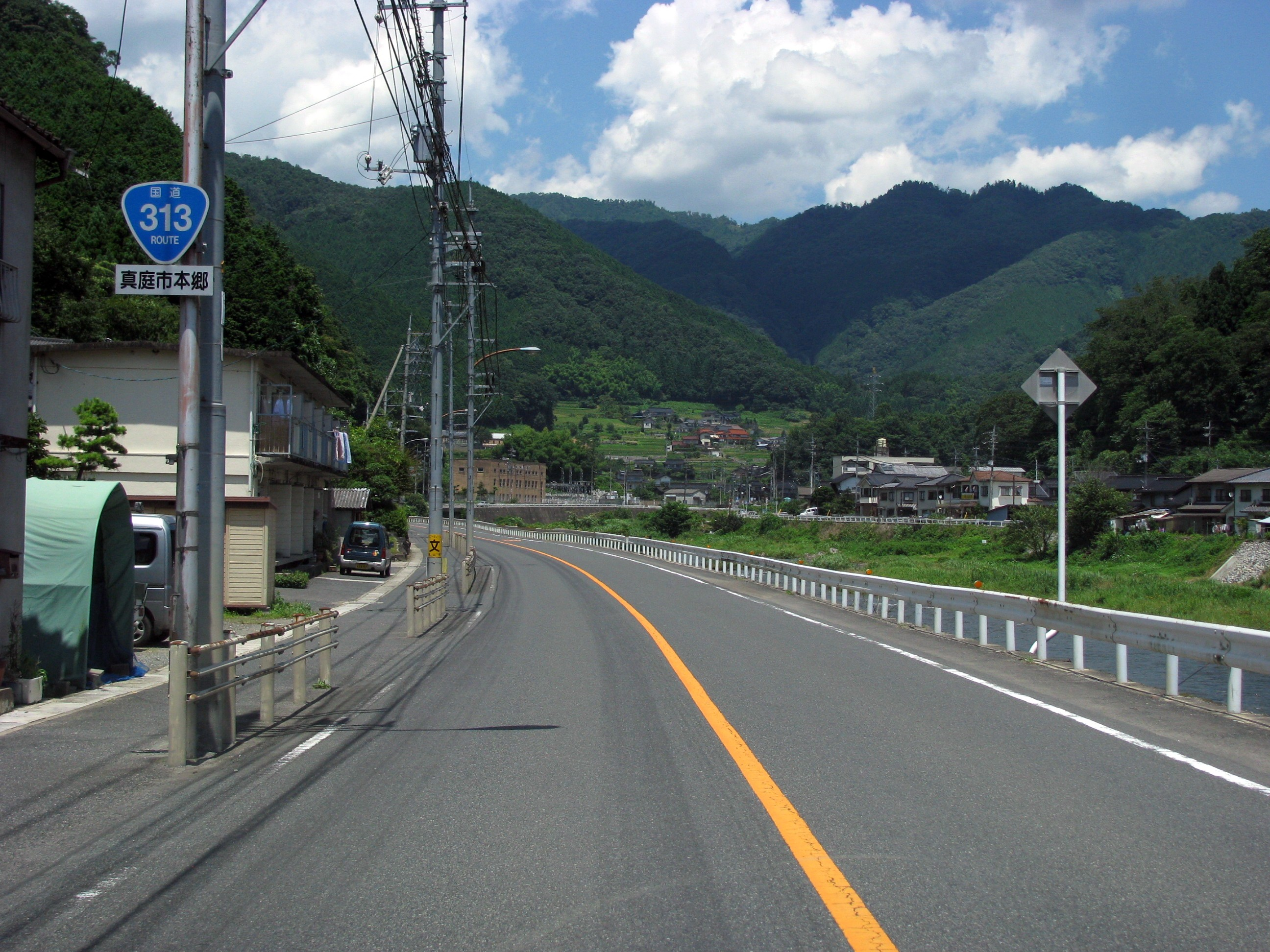

Route information
- Length: 171.5 km (106.6 mi)

Location
- Country: Japan

Highway system
- National highways of Japan; Expressways of Japan
← National Route 312	→ National Route 314

National Route 313 is a national highway of Japan connecting Fukuyama, Hiroshima and Hokuei, Tottori in Japan, with a total length of 171.5 km (106.57 mi).
