= Kannabe Station =

Railway station in Fukuyama, Hiroshima Prefecture, Japan

Kannabe Station 神辺駅
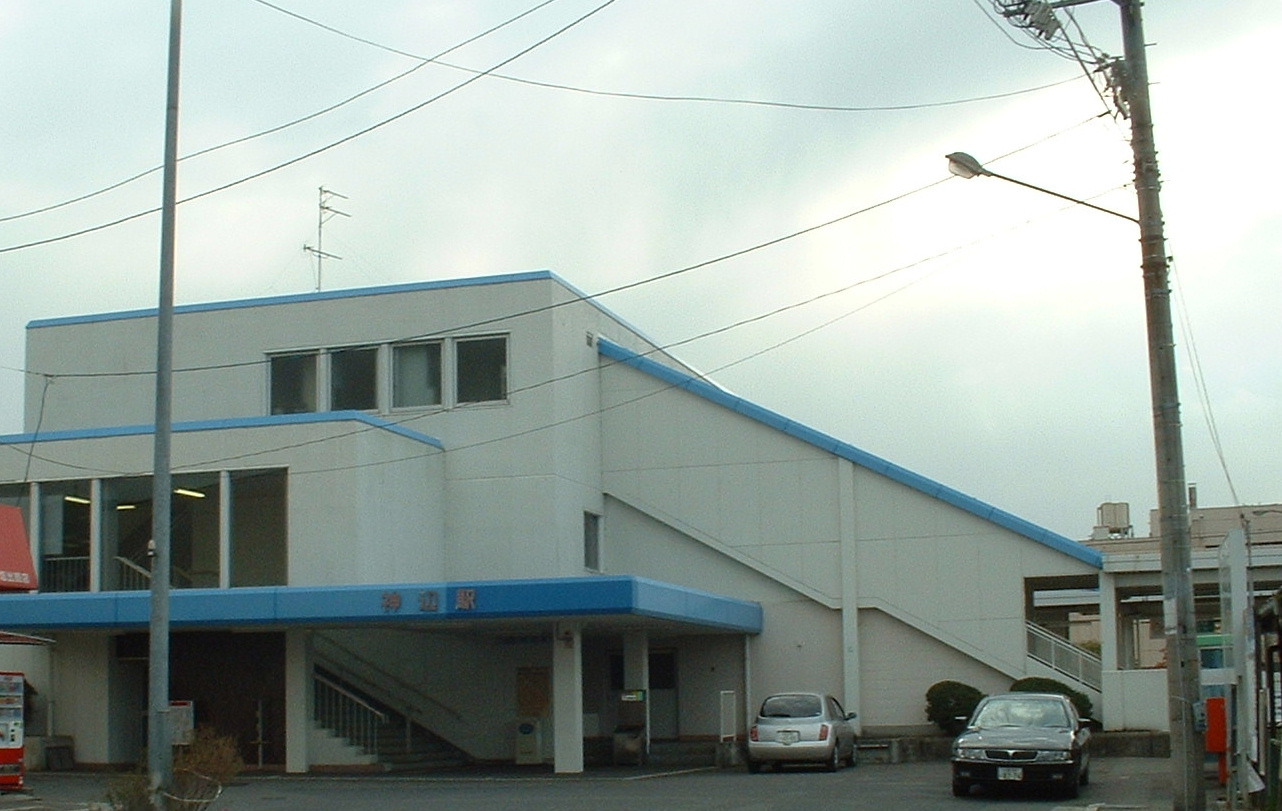
- Kannabe Station, March 2006

General information
- Location: 746-11 Kawaminami, Kannabe-chō, Fukuyama-shi, Hiroshima-ken 720-2124; Japan
- Coordinates: 34°32′13.61″N 133°22′43.44″E
- Operator: West Japan Railway Company; Ibara Railway Company
- Lines: Z Fukuen Line; ■ Ibara Line
- Distance: 8.4 km (5.2 miles) from Fukuyama
- Platforms: 3 side platforms
- Tracks: 3

Other information
- Status: Staffed (Ibara Railway only)
- Website: Official website

History
- Opened: 21 July 1914

Passengers
- 2018: 1438 daily (JR)
Location
- Location within Hiroshima Prefecture Location within Japan

Kannabe Station (神辺駅, Kannabe-eki) is a passenger railway station located in the city of Fukuyama, Hiroshima Prefecture, Japan. It is operated jointly by the West Japan Railway Company (JR West) and by the third sector transportation company, Ibara Railway Company).

== Lines ==
Kannabe Station is served by the Fukuen Line and is 8.4 kilometers from the terminus of the line at Fukuyama. It is also the western terminus of the 41.7 Ibara Line from Sōja.

== Station layout ==
The JR portion of the station consists of two elevated opposed side platforms with an elevated station building. The JR station is unattended. The Ibara Line has a single unnumbered side platform, connected to the JR tracks by an extension of the elevated station building, although the Ibara Railway has its own station building adjacent to the platform. The Ibara portion of the station is staffed.

=== Platforms ===
1	■ Z Fukuen Line	for Fukuyama
2	■ Z Fukuen Line	for Fuchū
2	■ Ibara Line	for Sōja (trains starting from Fukuyama only)
	■ Ibara Line	for Sōja

== Adjacent stations ==
«	Service	»
JR West
Fukuen Line
Yokoo	-	Yudamura
Ibara Railway
Ibara Line
Yuno	-	Terminus

== History ==
Kannabe Station was opened on July 21, 1914.

== Passenger statistics ==
In fiscal 2018, the JR portion of the station was used by an average of 1439 passengers daily.

== Surrounding area ==
- Japan National Route 313
- Kannabe Castle ruins

== See also ==
- List of railway stations in Japan
