= Sōja Station =

Railway station in Sōja, Okayama Prefecture, Japan

Sōja Station 総社駅
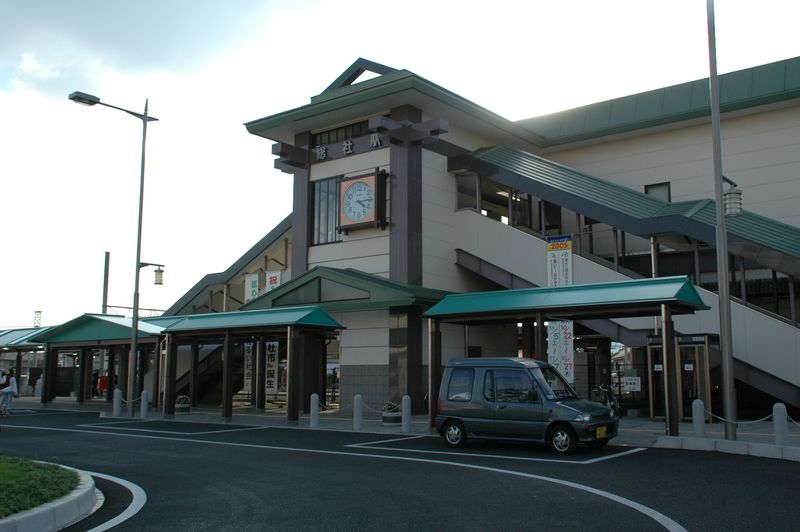
- Sōja Station building in 2005

General information
- Location: 1-1-1 Ekimae, Sōja-shi, Okayama-ken 719-1136; Japan
- Coordinates: 34°40′24.69″N 133°44′17.16″E
- Operator: JR West; Ibara Railway Company
- Lines: V Hakubi Line; U Kibi Line; ■ Ibara Line
- Distance: 26.6 km (16.5 miles) from Kurashiki
- Platforms: 1 side + 2 island platforms

Other information
- Status: Staffed
- Station code: JR-V07, JR-U10
- Website: Official website

History
- Opened: 15 February 1925
- Former names: Higashi-Sōja (to 1956)

Passengers
- 2019: 3506 daily
Location
- Location within Okayama Prefecture Location within Japan

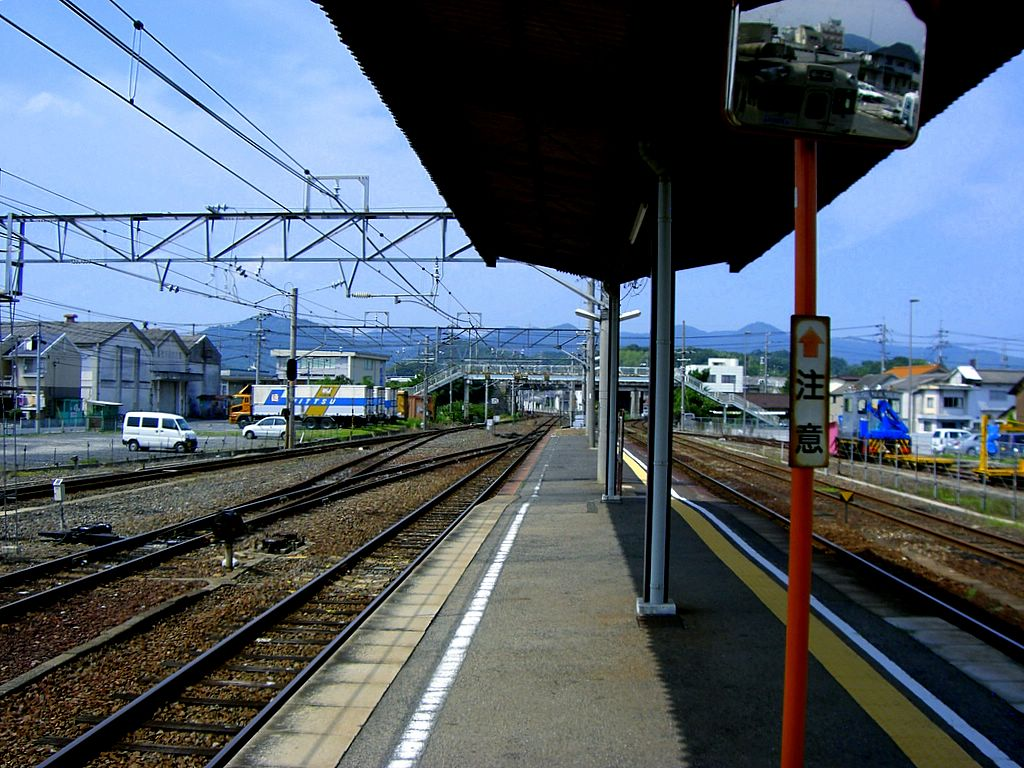
Sōja Station looking toward Bitchū-Takahashi Station (2006-07-22).

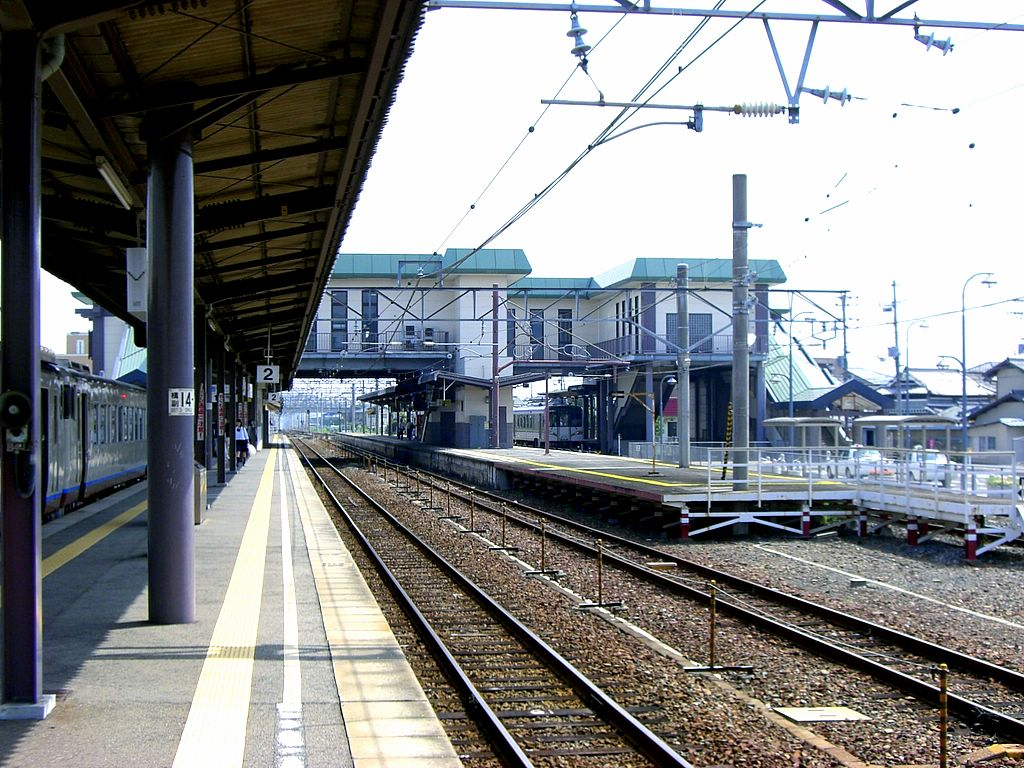
Sōja Station looking toward Kurashiki Station (2006-07-22).

Sōja Station (総社駅, Sōja-eki) is a passenger railway station located in the city of Sōja, Okayama Prefecture, Japan. It is jointly operated by the West Japan Railway Company (JR West) and the third sector transportation company, Ibara Railway Company

== Lines ==
Sōja Station is served by the Hakubi Line, and is located 10.7 km (6.6 mi) from the terminus of the line at Kurashiki and 26.6 km (16.5 mi) from Okayama. It is also the northern terminus of the 20.4 km (12.7 mi) Kibi Line from Okayama and the 41.7 km (25.9 mi) Ibara Railway Ibara Line from Kannabe.

== Station layout ==
The station consists of one side platform with a notch to enable it to serve two tracks, and two island platforms, connected by an elevated station building. The JR portion of the station is staffed.

=== Platforms ===
0	■ U Kibi Line	for Bitchū-Takamatsu and Okayama
1, 2	■ V Hakubi Line	for Kurashiki and Okayama
3	■ V Hakubi Line	for Bitchū-Takahashi and Niimi

5, 6	■ Ibara Line	for Ibara and Kannabe

== Adjacent stations ==
«	Service	»
Hakubi Line
Kiyone	Local	Gōkei
Kibi Line
Higashi-Sōja	Local	Terminus
Ibara Line
Terminus	-	Kiyone

== History ==
Sōja Station was opened on February 17, 1925 as Higashi-Sōja Station (東総社駅). It was renamed on November 1, 1959. With the privatization of the Japan National Railways (JNR) on April 1, 1987, the station came under the aegis of the West Japan Railway Company. The Ibara Railway connected to the station on January 11, 1999.

== Passenger statistics ==
In fiscal 2019, the JR portion of the station was used by an average of 3506 passengers daily.

== Surrounding area ==
- Sōja City Hall
- Sōja Municipal Sōja Nishi Junior High School
- Sōja Municipal Sōja Chuo Elementary School

== See also ==
- List of railway stations in Japan
- Gunma-Sōja Station (on the Joetsu Line in Gunma Prefecture)
