= Fuchū, Hiroshima =

Fuchū 府中市
- City
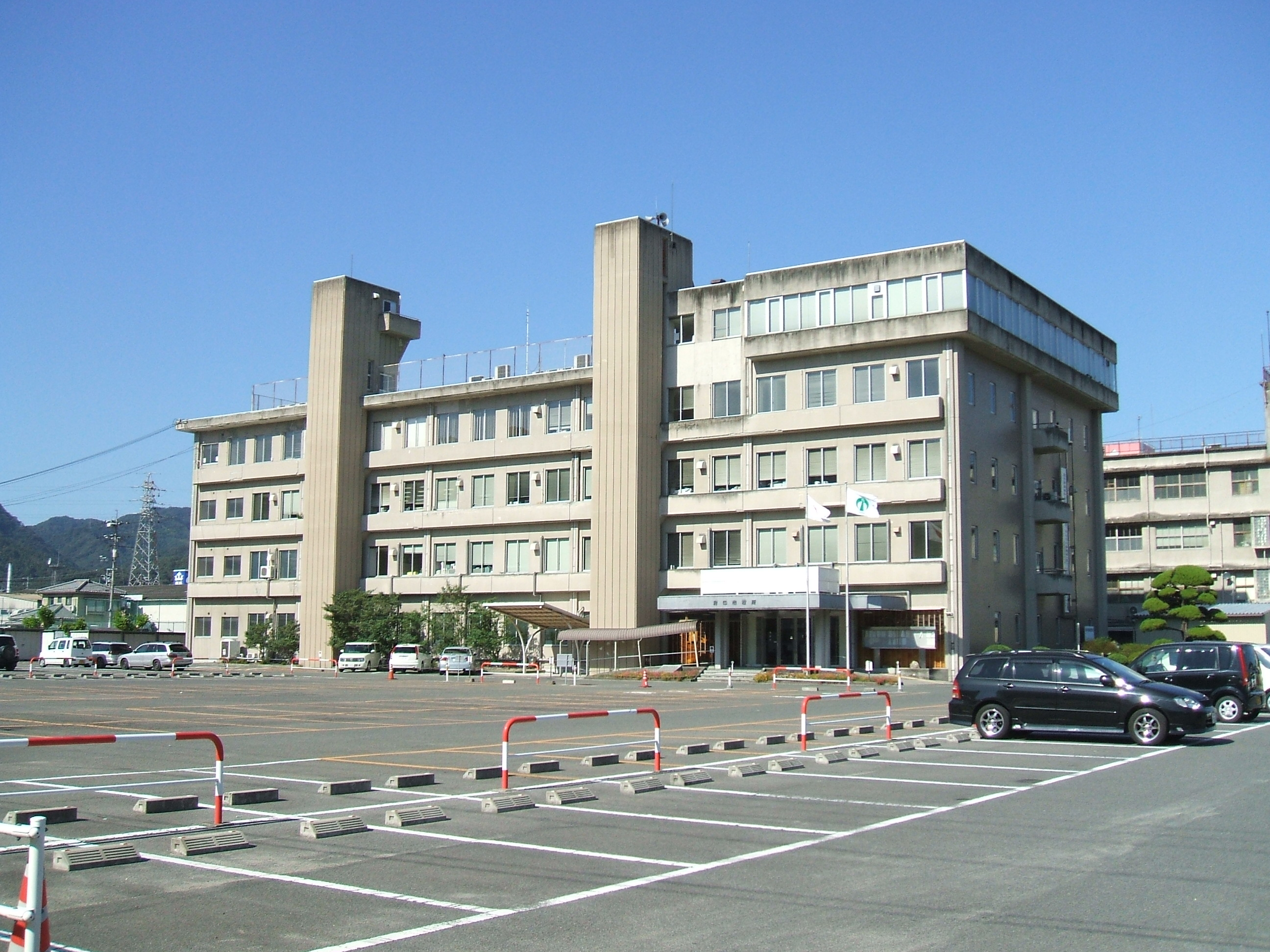
- Fuchū City Hall

- Flag Emblem
- Interactive map of Fuchū
- Location in Japan
- Coordinates: 34°33′54″N 133°14′31″E
- Country: Japan
- Region: Chūgoku (San'yō)
- Prefecture: Hiroshima

Government
  - Mayor: Shinji Ono (since May 2018)

Area
  - Total: 195.75 km^{2} (75.58 sq mi)

Population (April 1, 2023)
  - Total: 36,326
  - Density: 185.57/km^{2} (480.63/sq mi)
- Time zone: UTC+09:00 (JST)
- City hall address: 315 Fukawacho, Fuchu-shi, Hiroshima-ken 726-8601
- Climate: Cfa
- Website: Official website
- Symbols
- Flower: Hydrangea
- Tree: Cherry blossom

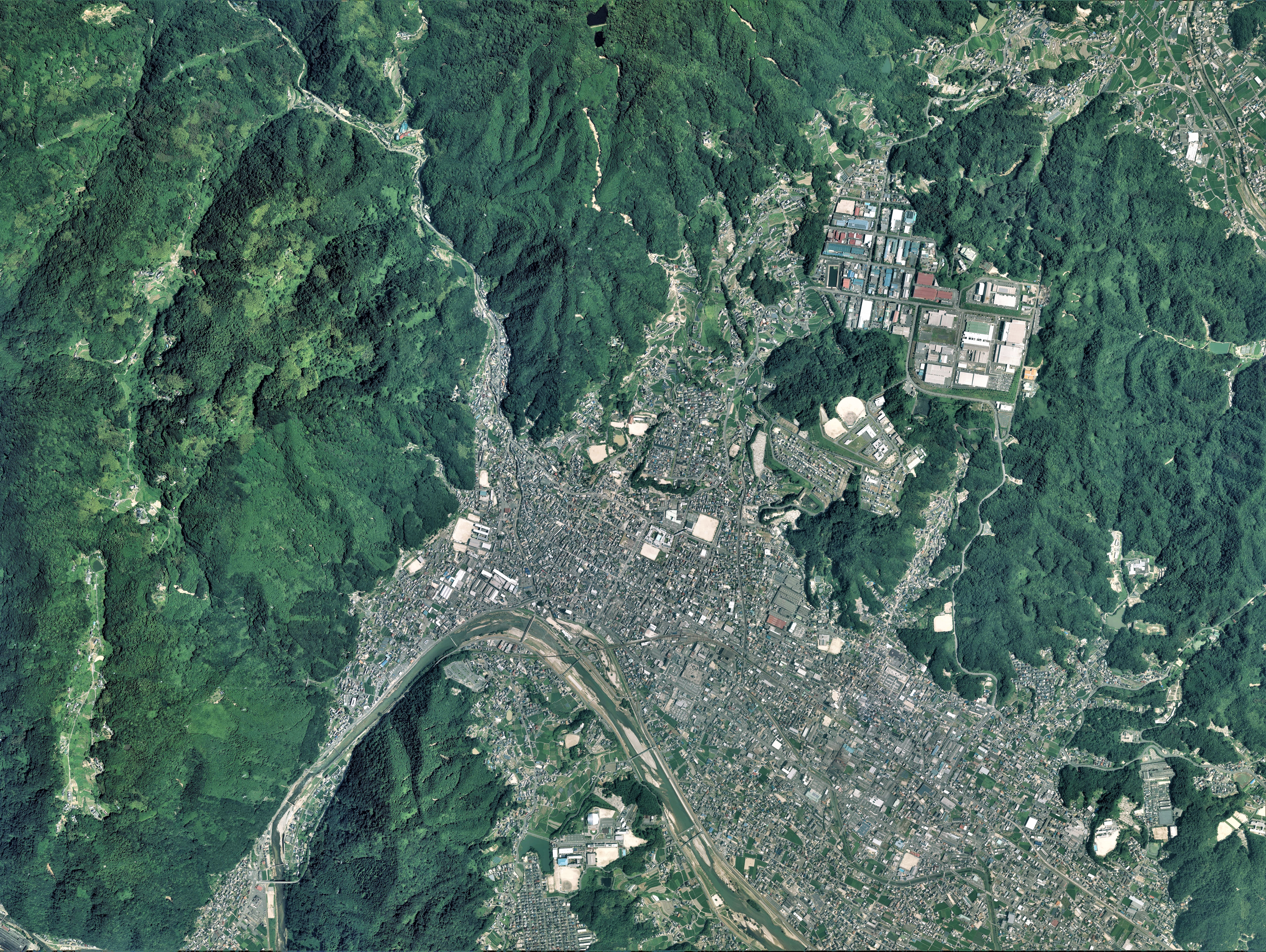
Aerial view of central Fuchū

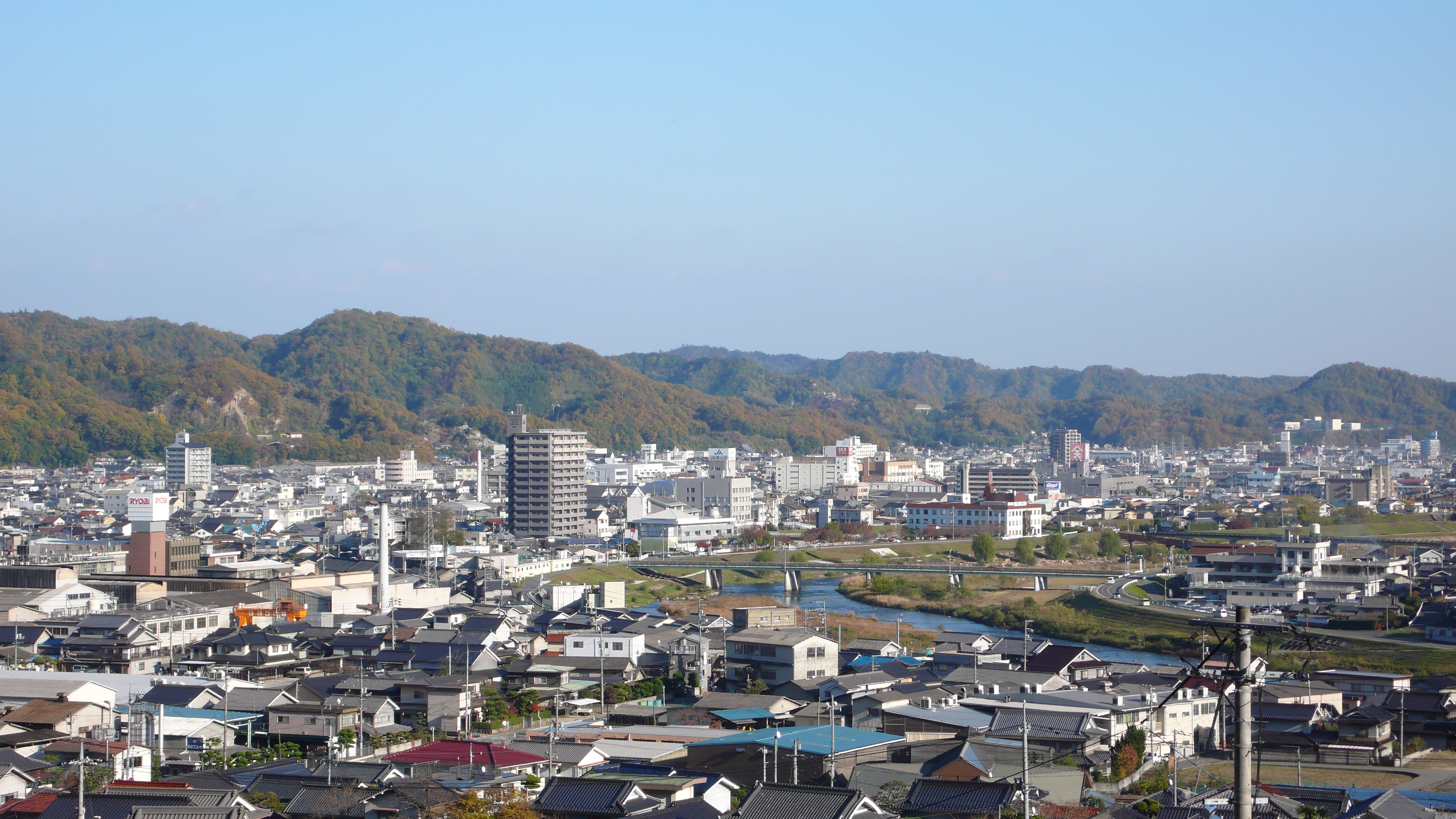
Panorama of Fuchū

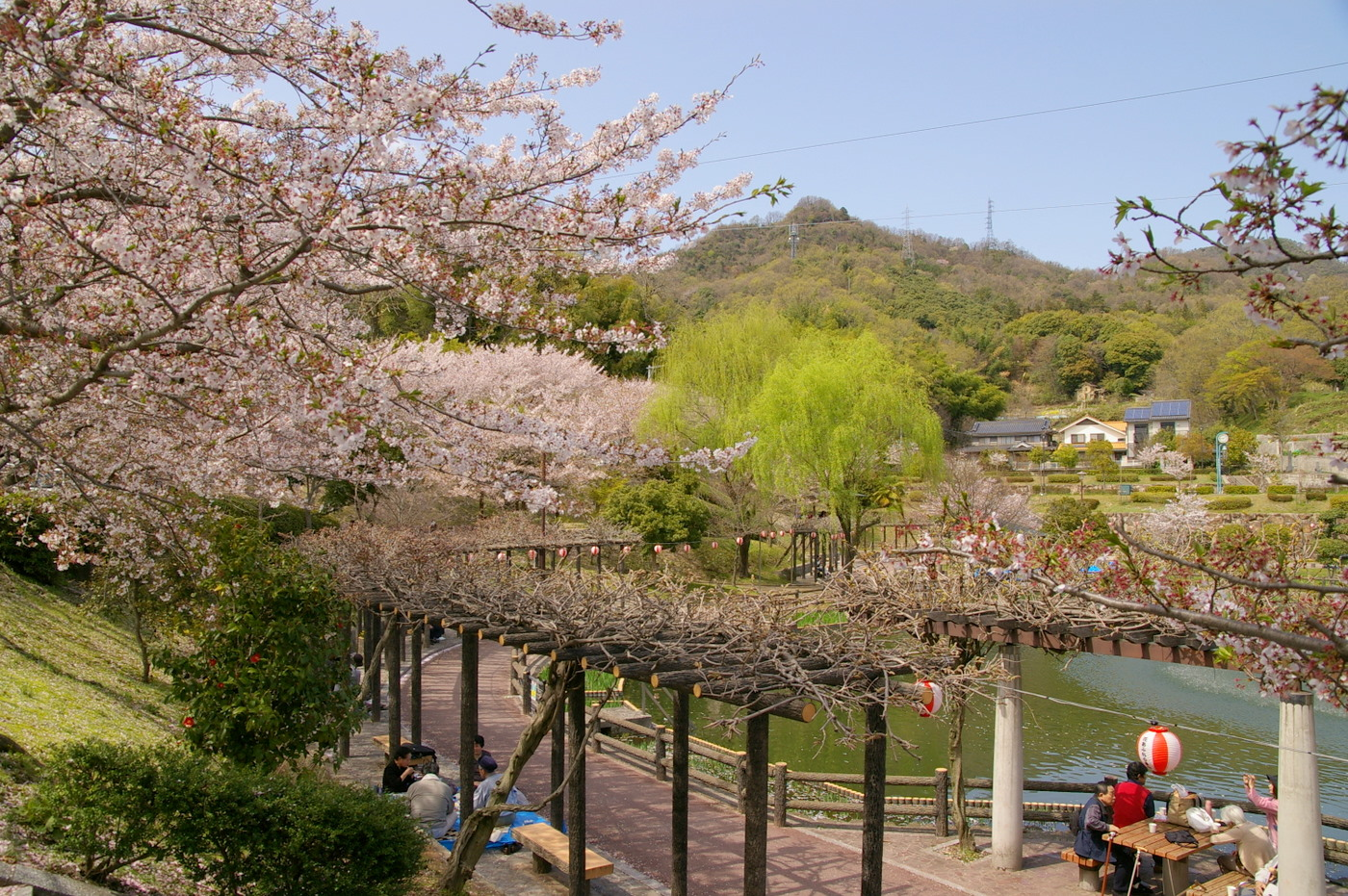
Fuchū Park

Fuchū (府中市, Fuchū-shi) is a city located in Hiroshima Prefecture, Japan. As of 1 April 2023, the city had an estimated population of 36,326 in 17013 households and a population density of 190 persons per km^{2}. The total area of the city is 195.75 square kilometres (75.58 sq mi).

== Geography ==
Fuchū is located in the basin of the Ashida River in eastern Hiroshima.

=== Adjoining municipalities ===
Hiroshima Prefecture

- Fukuyama
- Jinsekikōgen
- Miyoshi
- Onomichi
- Sera
- Shōbara

=== Climate ===
Fuchū has a humid subtropical climate (Köppen climate classification Cfa) characterized by cool to mild winters and hot, humid summers. The average annual temperature in Fuchū is 15.0 °C (59.0 °F). The average annual rainfall is 1,257.7 mm (49.52 in) with July as the wettest month. The temperatures are highest on average in August, at around 27.2 °C (81.0 °F), and lowest in January, at around 3.6 °C (38.5 °F). The highest temperature ever recorded in Fuchū was 39.5 °C (103.1 °F) on 2−3 August 2026; the coldest temperature ever recorded was −9.9 °C (14.2 °F) on 27 February 1981.

Climate data for Fuchū (1991−2020 normals, extremes 1979−present)
Month	Jan	Feb	Mar	Apr	May	Jun	Jul	Aug	Sep	Oct	Nov	Dec	Year
Record high °C (°F)	17.3 (63.1)	22.2 (72.0)	25.7 (78.3)	30.5 (86.9)	34.1 (93.4)	36.3 (97.3)	39.3 (102.7)	39.5 (103.1)	38.1 (100.6)	31.9 (89.4)	27.9 (82.2)	20.7 (69.3)	39.5 (103.1)
Mean daily maximum °C (°F)	8.8 (47.8)	10.0 (50.0)	13.9 (57.0)	19.8 (67.6)	24.7 (76.5)	27.5 (81.5)	31.2 (88.2)	32.9 (91.2)	28.7 (83.7)	22.9 (73.2)	16.8 (62.2)	11.1 (52.0)	20.7 (69.2)
Daily mean °C (°F)	3.6 (38.5)	4.4 (39.9)	7.8 (46.0)	13.3 (55.9)	18.3 (64.9)	22.1 (71.8)	26.1 (79.0)	27.2 (81.0)	23.1 (73.6)	17.0 (62.6)	10.9 (51.6)	5.7 (42.3)	15.0 (58.9)
Mean daily minimum °C (°F)	−0.7 (30.7)	−0.4 (31.3)	2.2 (36.0)	7.2 (45.0)	12.5 (54.5)	17.7 (63.9)	22.1 (71.8)	22.9 (73.2)	18.8 (65.8)	12.2 (54.0)	5.9 (42.6)	1.2 (34.2)	10.1 (50.3)
Record low °C (°F)	−8.0 (17.6)	−9.9 (14.2)	−5.0 (23.0)	−2.4 (27.7)	1.5 (34.7)	9.2 (48.6)	13.4 (56.1)	14.9 (58.8)	6.6 (43.9)	0.6 (33.1)	−1.8 (28.8)	−6.0 (21.2)	−9.9 (14.2)
Average precipitation mm (inches)	40.6 (1.60)	49.5 (1.95)	88.9 (3.50)	100.7 (3.96)	130.3 (5.13)	185.1 (7.29)	210.4 (8.28)	111.6 (4.39)	140.6 (5.54)	93.7 (3.69)	59.4 (2.34)	47.1 (1.85)	1,257.7 (49.52)
Average precipitation days (≥ 1.0 mm)	5.8	7.6	9.5	9.4	9.3	11.2	10.5	7.5	8.7	6.9	6.4	6.8	99.6
Mean monthly sunshine hours	136.4	139.4	174.3	193.3	209.4	148.5	167.0	196.5	153.4	167.5	148.3	138.2	1,984.5
Source: Japan Meteorological Agency

=== Demographics ===
Per Japanese census data, the population of Fuchū in 2020 is 37,655 people. Fuchū has been conducting censuses since 1960.

Historical population
Year	Pop.	±%
1960	54,327	—
1965	57,216	+5.3%
1970	58,364	+2.0%
1975	57,625	−1.3%
1980	56,209	−2.5%
1985	54,939	−2.3%
1990	52,692	−4.1%
1995	50,356	−4.4%
2000	47,697	−5.3%
2005	45,188	−5.3%
2010	42,557	−5.8%
2015	40,069	−5.8%
2020	37,655	−6.0%
Fuchū population statistics

== History ==
The area of Fuchū was part on ancient Bingo Province, and was the site of the Nara period Bingo Provincial Capital. During the Edo Period, it was largely the territory of Fukuyama Domain. Following the Meiji restoration, the village of Fuchūichi was established with the creation of the modern municipalities system on April 1, 1889. It became the town of Fuchū on June 3, 1896. Fuchū was raised to city status on March 31, 1954. On April 1, 2004, the town of Jōge (from Kōnu District) was merged into Fuchū.

== Government ==
Fuchū has a mayor-council form of government with a directly elected mayor and a unicameral city council of 20 members. Fuchū contributes one member to the Hiroshima Prefectural Assembly.

In terms of national politics, Fuchū is part of the Hiroshima 5th district of the lower house of the Diet of Japan. The city was previously part of Hiroshima 6th district.

== Economy ==
Fuchū is an inland industrial city. Furniture making as a local industry has a tradition from the Edo period and in particular, the Fuchū chest-of-drawers made of paulownia wood remains famous. It is also the production area of 'Fuchū Miso'. Cotton farming and processing, textiles and dying, tobacco farming and die-cast metal products contribute to the economy.

== Education ==
Fuchū has six public elementary schools, two public junior high schools and two public combined elementary/middle schools operated by the city government, and three public high schools operated by the Hiroshima Prefectural Board of Education.

== Transportation ==
=== Railway ===
JR West (JR West) - Fukuen Line

- Takagi - Ukai - Fuchū - Shimo-Kawabe - Nakahata - Kawasa - Bingo-Mikawa - Bingo-Yano - Jōge

=== Highways ===
- National Route 432
- National Route 486
