= Bingo-Yano Station =

Railway station in Fuchū, Hiroshima Prefecture, Japan

Bingo-Yano Station 備後矢野駅
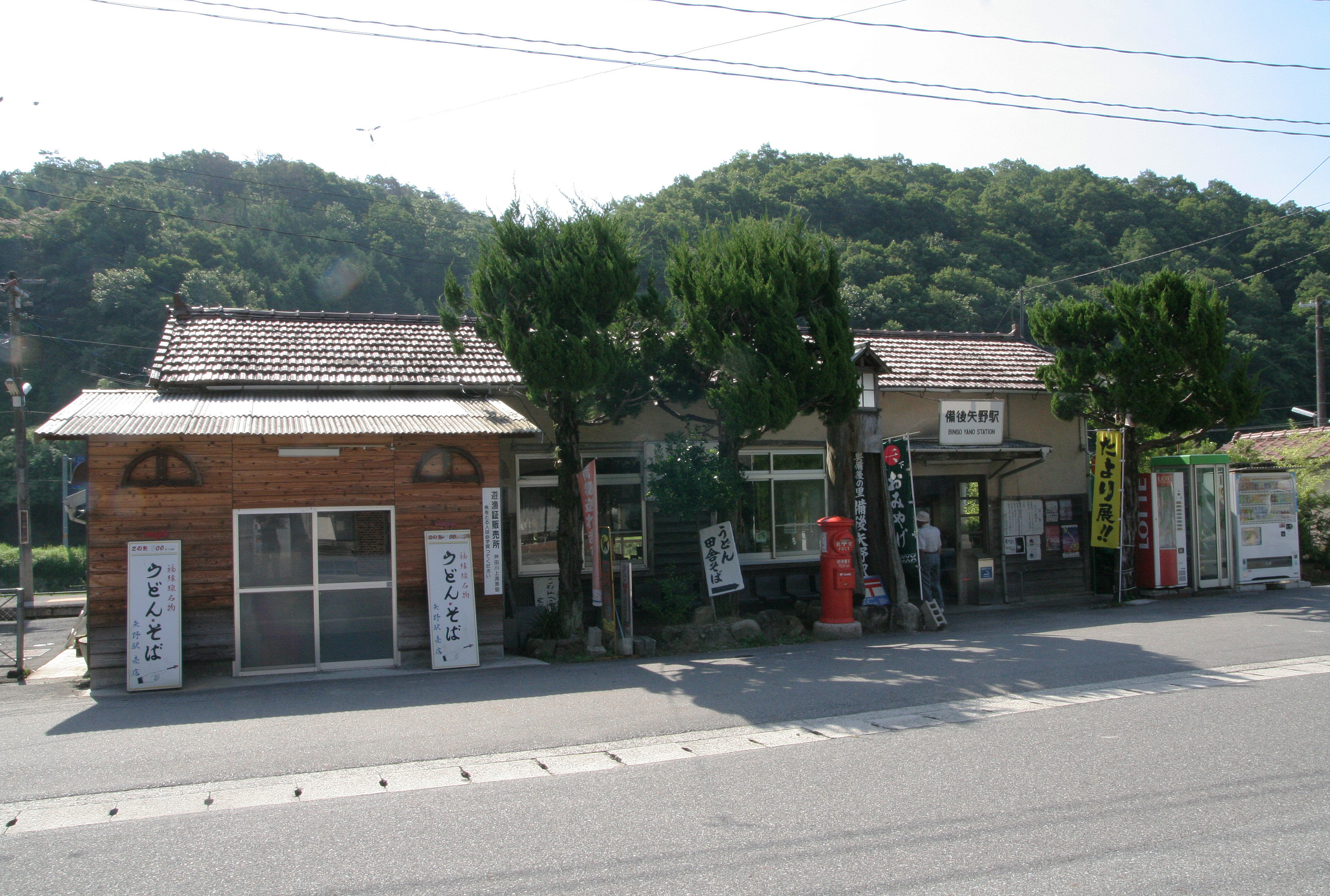
- Bingo-Yano Station, July 2008

General information
- Location: 353-4 Yatada, Jōge-chō, Fuchū-shi, Hiroshima-ken 729-3415; Japan
- Coordinates: 34°39′53.12″N 133°7′33.83″E
- Owner: West Japan Railway Company
- Operator: West Japan Railway Company
- Line: Z Fukuen Line
- Distance: 46.6 km (29.0 miles) from Fukuyama
- Platforms: 1 island platform
- Tracks: 2
- Connections: Bus stop

Construction
- Structure type: Ground level
- Accessible: Yes

Other information
- Status: Unstaffed
- Website: Official website

History
- Opened: 28 July 1938

Passengers
- FY2019: 10

Services
Preceding station	JR West	Following station
Jōge towards Miyoshi	Fukuen Line Local	Bingo-Mikawa towards Fukuyama
Location
- Location within Hiroshima Prefecture Location within Japan

Bingo-Yano Station (備後矢野駅, Bingo-Yano-eki) is a passenger railway station located in the city of Fuchū, Hiroshima Prefecture, Japan. It is operated by the West Japan Railway Company (JR West).

== Lines ==
Bingo-Yano Station is served by the JR West Fukuen Line, and is located 46.6 kilometers from the terminus of the line at Fukuyama.

== Station layout ==
The station consists of one island platform connected to the station building by a level crossing. The station is unattended.In addition to the folk handicraft shop inside the station building, there is also an udon and soba restaurant.

=== Platforms ===
1	■ Z Fukuen Line	for Fuchū and Fukuyama
2	■ Z Fukuen Line	for Miyoshi

== History ==
Bingo-Yano Station was opened on 28 July 1938. With the privatization of the Japanese National Railways (JNR) on 1 April 1987, the station came under the control of JR West.

== Passenger statistics ==
In fiscal 2019, the station was used by an average of 10 passengers daily.

== Surrounding area ==
- Fuchu Municipal Jojo Minami Elementary School
- Bingo Yatada Castle Ruinsl
- Japan National Route 432

== See also ==
- List of railway stations in Japan
