= Jōge Station =

Railway station in Fuchū, Hiroshima Prefecture, Japan

Jōge Station 上下駅
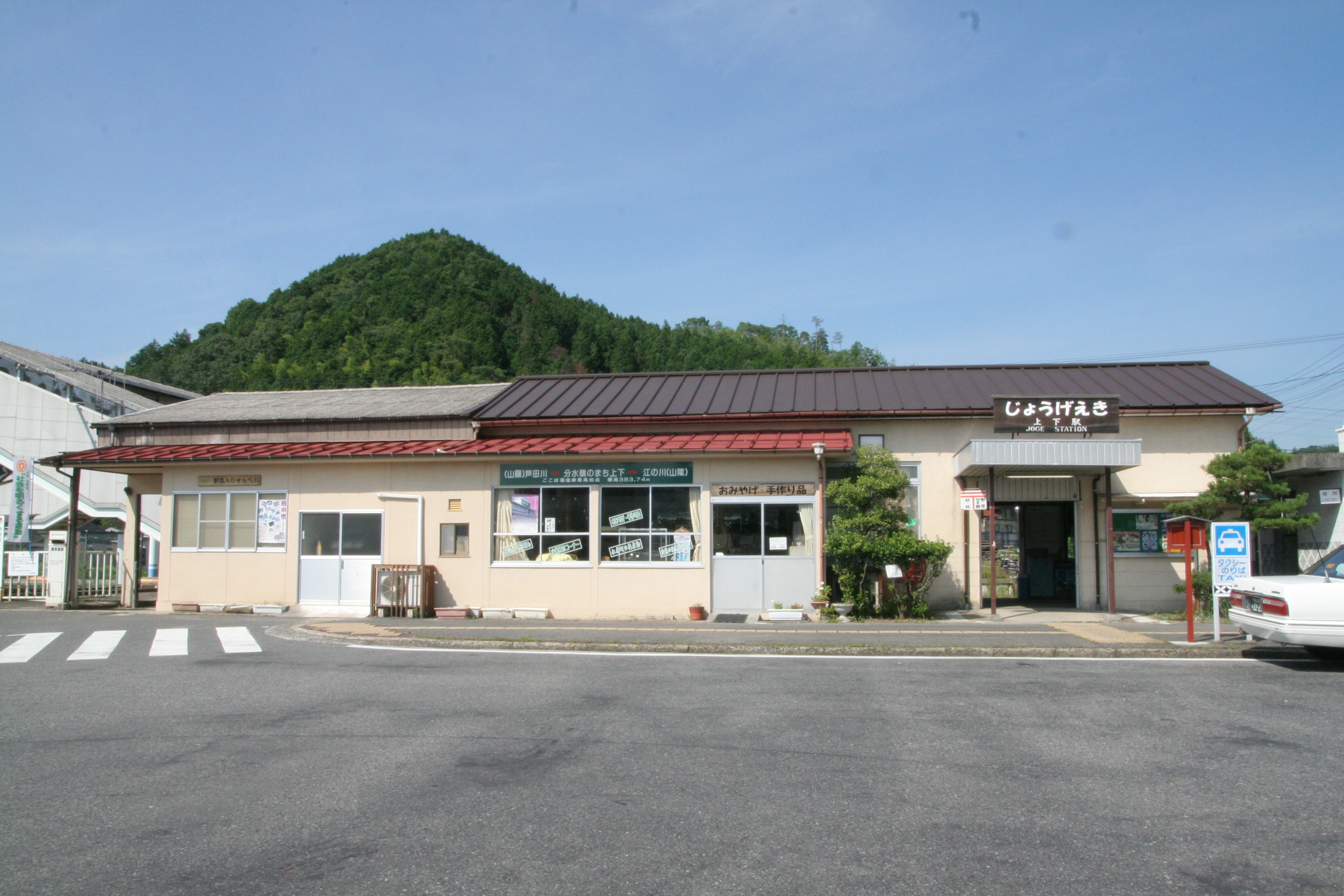
- Jōge Station, July 2008

General information
- Location: 847-2 Jōge, Jōge-chō, Fuchū-shi, Hiroshima-ken 729-3431; Japan
- Coordinates: 34°41′41.82″N 133°7′3.35″E
- Owner: West Japan Railway Company
- Operator: West Japan Railway Company
- Line: Z Fukuen Line
- Distance: 50.3 km (31.3 miles) from Fukuyama
- Platforms: 2 side platforms
- Tracks: 2
- Connections: Bus stop

Construction
- Structure type: Ground level
- Accessible: Yes

Other information
- Status: Unstaffed
- Website: Official website

History
- Opened: 15 November 1935

Passengers
- FY2019: 62

Services
Preceding station	JR West	Following station
Kōnu towards Miyoshi	Fukuen Line Local	Bingo-Yano towards Fukuyama
Location
- Location within Hiroshima Prefecture Location within Japan

Jōge Station (上下駅, Jōge-eki) is a passenger railway station located in the city of Fuchū, Hiroshima Prefecture, Japan. It is operated by the West Japan Railway Company (JR West).

== Lines ==
Jōge Station is served by the JR West Fukuen Line, and is located 50.3 kilometers from the terminus of the line at Fukuyama.

== Station layout ==
The station consists of twi opposed side platforms, connected to the station building by a footbridge. The station is unattended.

=== Platforms ===
1	■ Z Fukuen Line	for Fuchū and Fukuyama
2	■ Z Fukuen Line	for Miyoshi

== History ==
Jōge Station was opened on 15 November 1935. With the privatization of the Japanese National Railways (JNR) on 1 April 1987, the station came under the control of JR West.

== Passenger statistics ==
In fiscal 2019, the station was used by an average of 62 passengers daily.

== Surrounding area ==
- Fuchu City Jōge branch office
- Hiroshima Prefectural Jōge High School
- Fuchu Kita Municipal Hospital
- Jōge Daikansho Ruins
- Fuchu City Jōge History and Culture Museum

== See also ==
- List of railway stations in Japan
