= Kazusa-Nakano Station =

Railway station in Ōtaki, Chiba Prefecture, Japan

Coordinates: 35°15′0.0″N 140°11′59.5″E

Kazusa-Nakano Station 上総中野駅
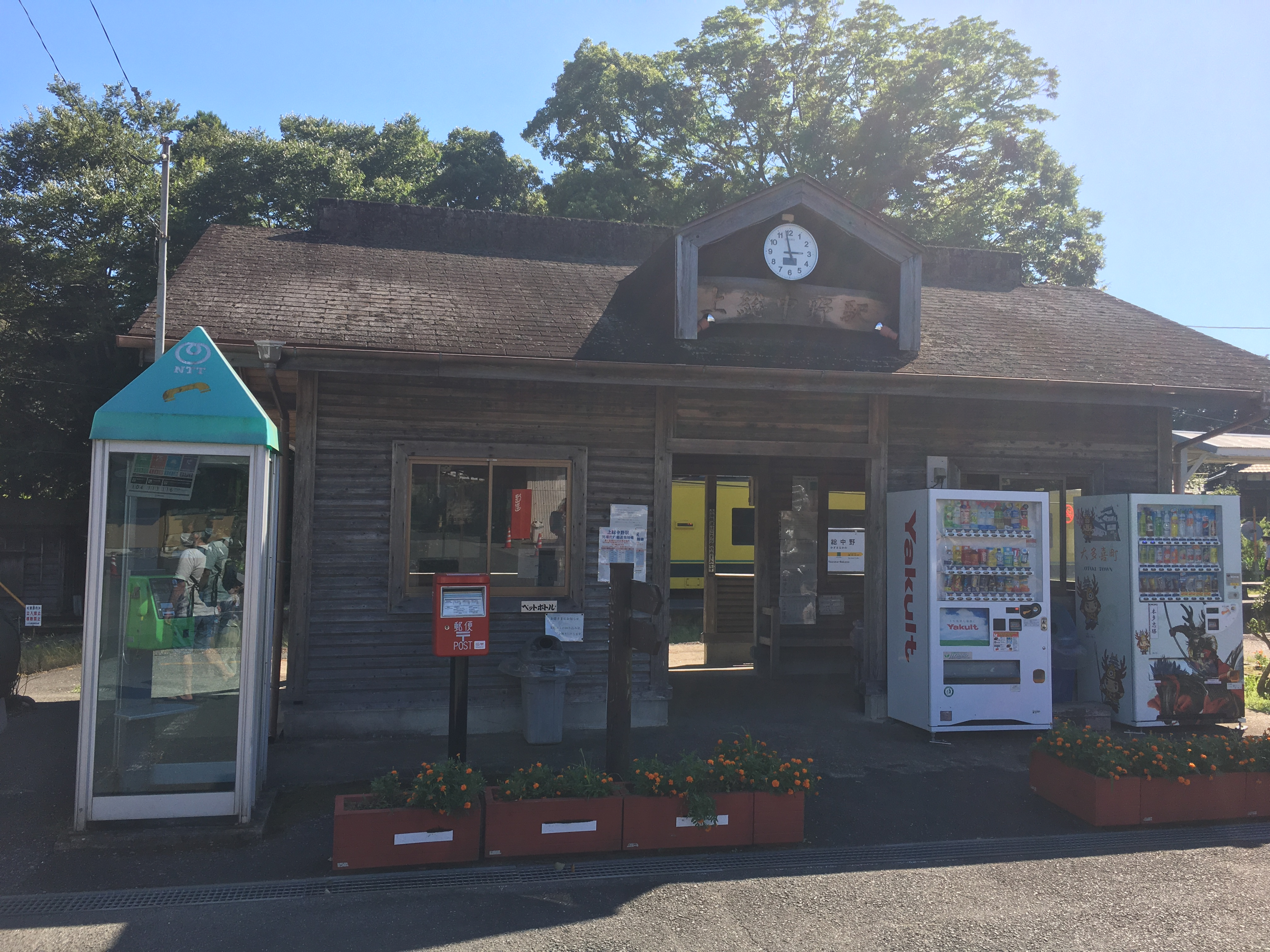
- Kazusa-Nakano Station, August 2021

General information
- Location: 61 Horikiri, Ōtaki, Isumi, Chiba （千葉県夷隅郡大多喜町堀切61） Japan
- Operator: Kominato Railway; Isumi Railway
- Lines: Kominato Line; Isumi Line

History
- Opened: 1928

Services
Preceding station	Kominato Railway	Following station
Yōrōkeikoku towards Goi	Kominato Line	Terminus
Preceding station	Isumi Railway	Following station
Terminus	Isumi Line Local	Nakahata towards Ōhara
Location

Kazusa-Nakano Station (上総中野駅, Kazusa-Nakano-eki) is a railway station in Ōtaki, Chiba, Japan, jointly operated by the Isumi Railway Company and Kominato Railway Company.

== Lines ==
Kazusa-Nakano Station is served by the Isumi Line and Kominato Line. It is located 26.8 km from the eastern terminus of the Izumi Line at Ōhara Station, and 39.1 km from the western terminus of the Kominato Line at Goi Station.

== Station layout ==
Kazusa-Nakano Station has two side platforms, each serving bidirectional traffic; one platform is for the Isumi Line, and the other for the Kominato Line. The station is unstaffed.

=== Platforms ===
1	■ Kominato Line	for Yōrōkeikoku, Kazusa-Ushiku, and Goi
2	■ Isumi Line	for Ōhara and Ōtaki

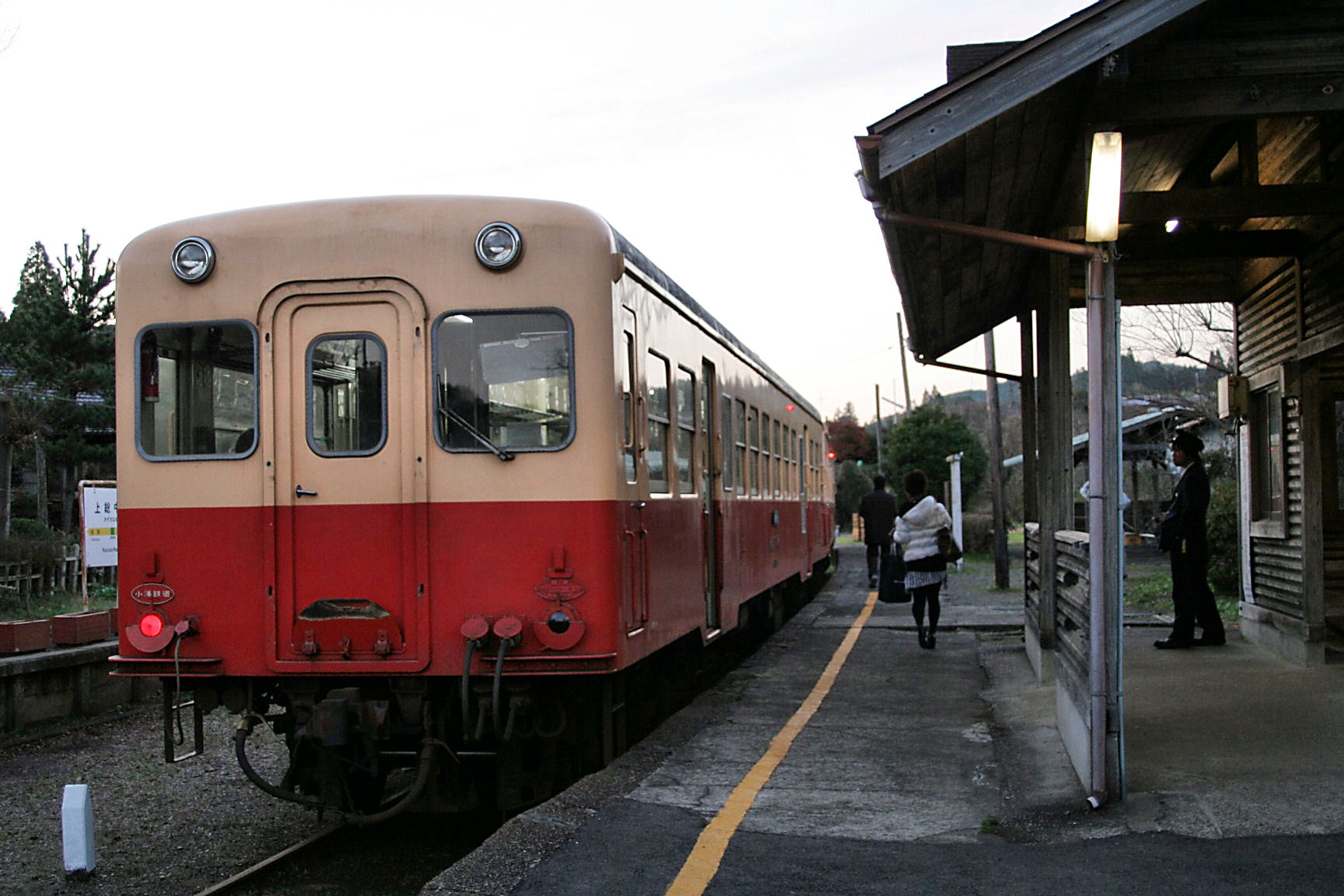
Kominato line train in Kazusa-Nakano station

== History ==
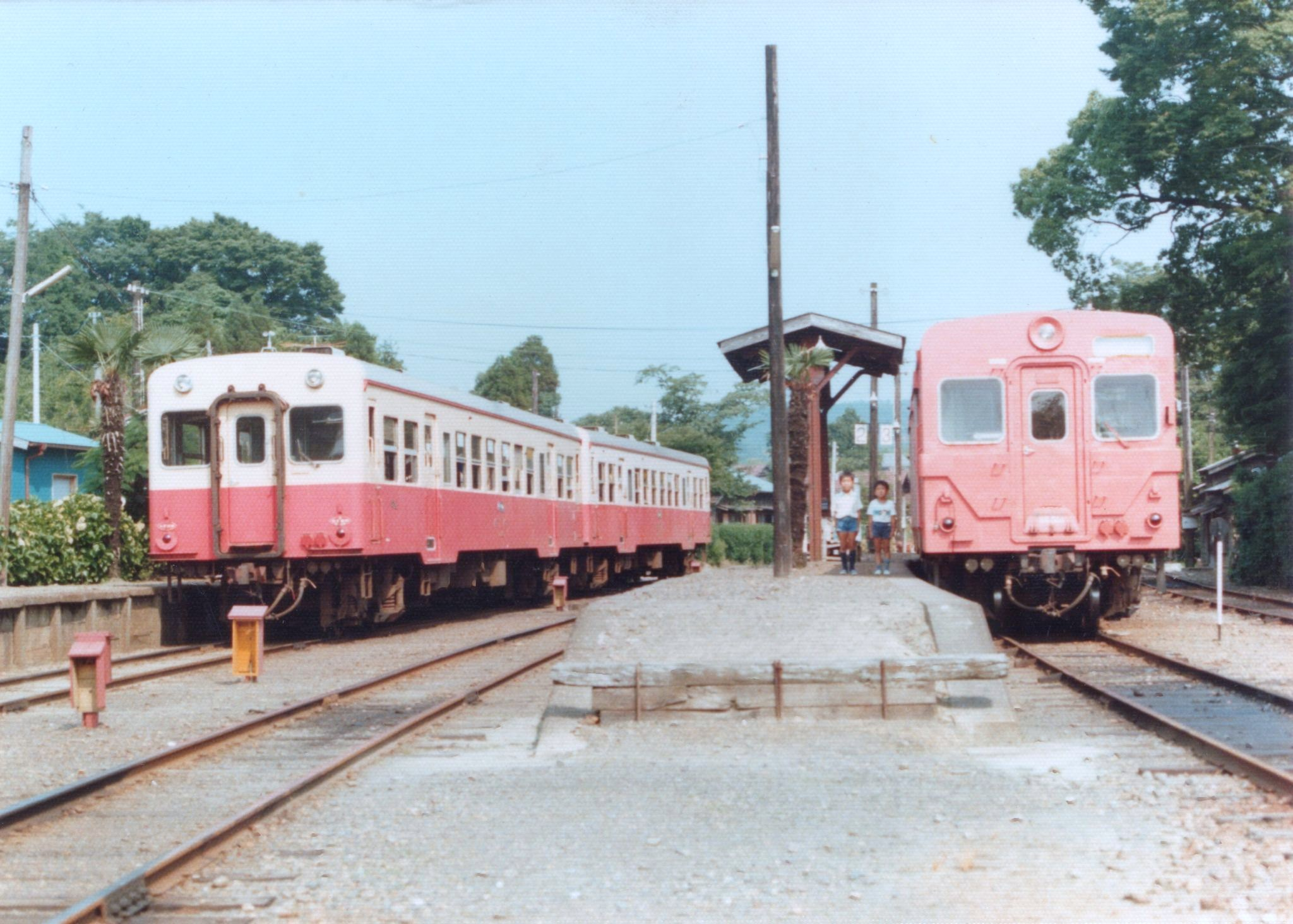
Kazusa-Nakano Station circa 1980 while still operated by JNR

Kazusa-Nakano Station was opened on May 16, 1928 as a station on the Kominato Line. On August 26, 1934, the Japanese Government Railway (JGR) Kihara Line, the predecessor of the Isumi Line, began operations from Kazusa-Nakano Station. The Kihara Line became part of the Japanese National Railways (JNR) after World War II, and freight operations were discontinued from October 1, 1974. With the division and privatization of the Japan National Railways on April 1, 1987, the Kihara Line was acquired by the East Japan Railway Company and was renamed the Isumi Line on March 24, 1988. In 1989, Kazusa-Nakano station's station structure underwent reconstruction.

== Surrounding area ==
- National Route 465
