= Sera, Hiroshima =

Sera 世羅町
- Town
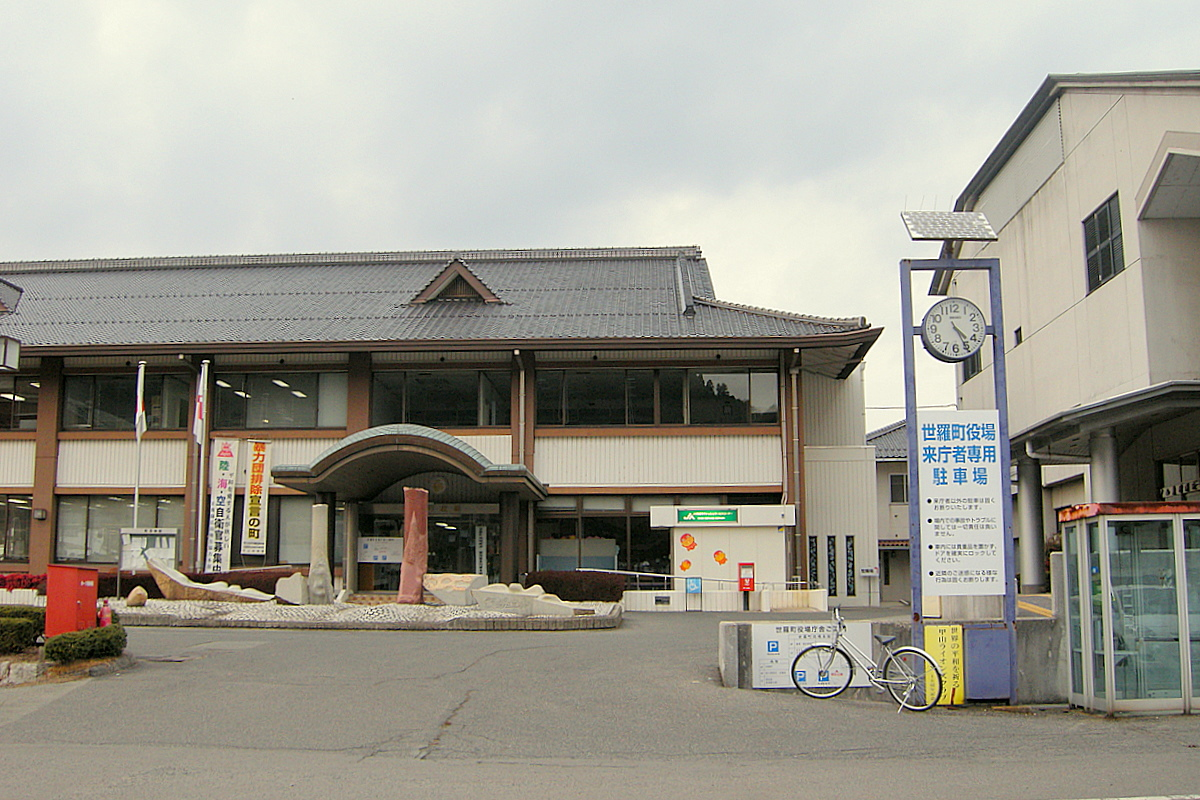
- Sera Town Hall

- Flag Seal
- Location of Sera in Hiroshima Prefecture

- Location in Japan
- Coordinates: 34°35′13″N 133°3′24″E
- Country: Japan
- Region: Chūgoku; San'yō
- Prefecture: Hiroshima
- District: Sera

Area
  - Total: 278.14 km^{2} (107.39 sq mi)

Population (March 31, 2023)
  - Total: 15,070
  - Density: 54.18/km^{2} (140.3/sq mi)
- Time zone: UTC+09:00 (JST)
- City hall address: 123-1 Nishiuehara, Sera-chō, Sera-gun, Hiroshima-ken 722-1192
- Climate: Cfa
- Website: Official website
- Symbols
- Flower: Lily of the valley
- Tree: Pine

Sera Winery

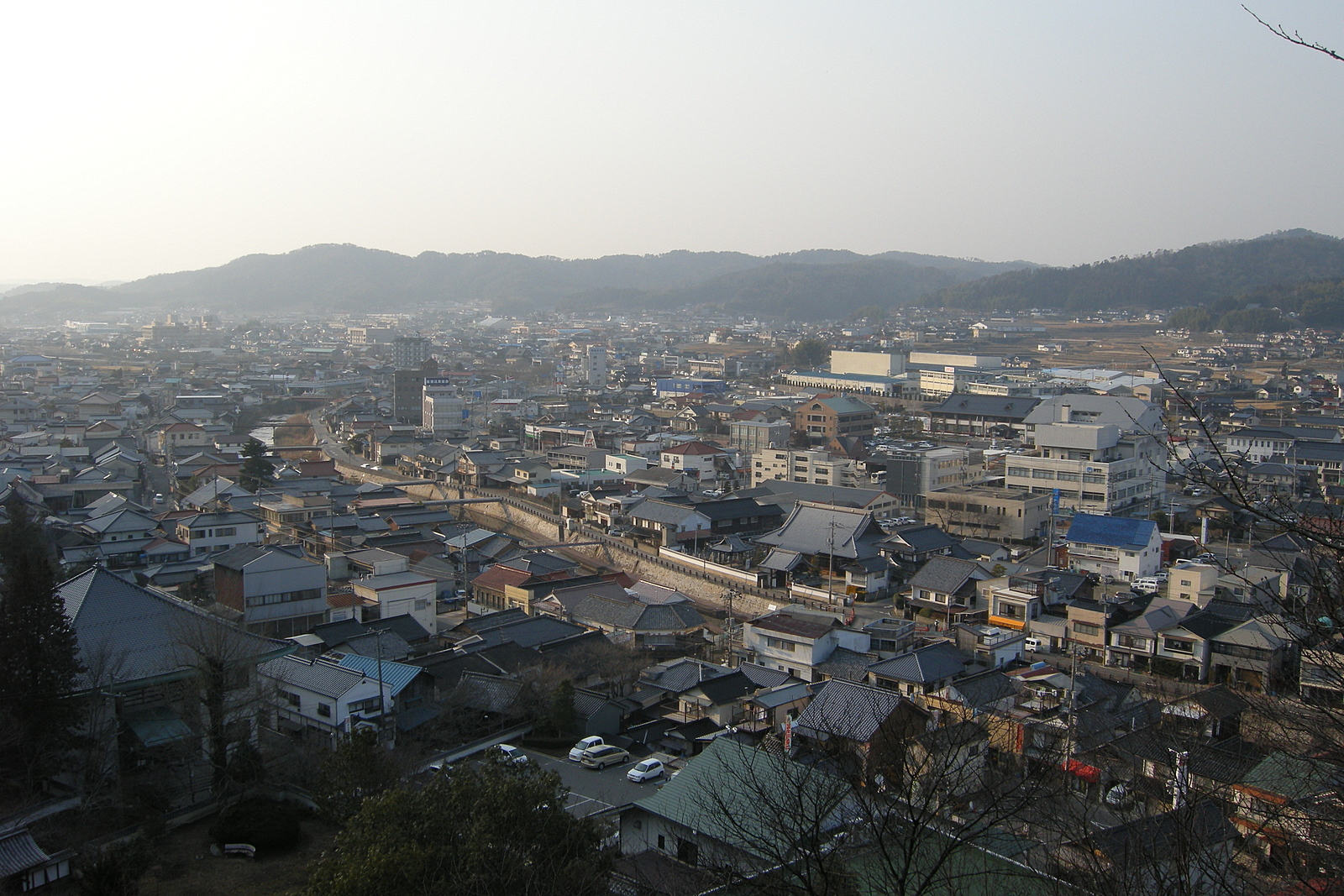
Sera town panorama

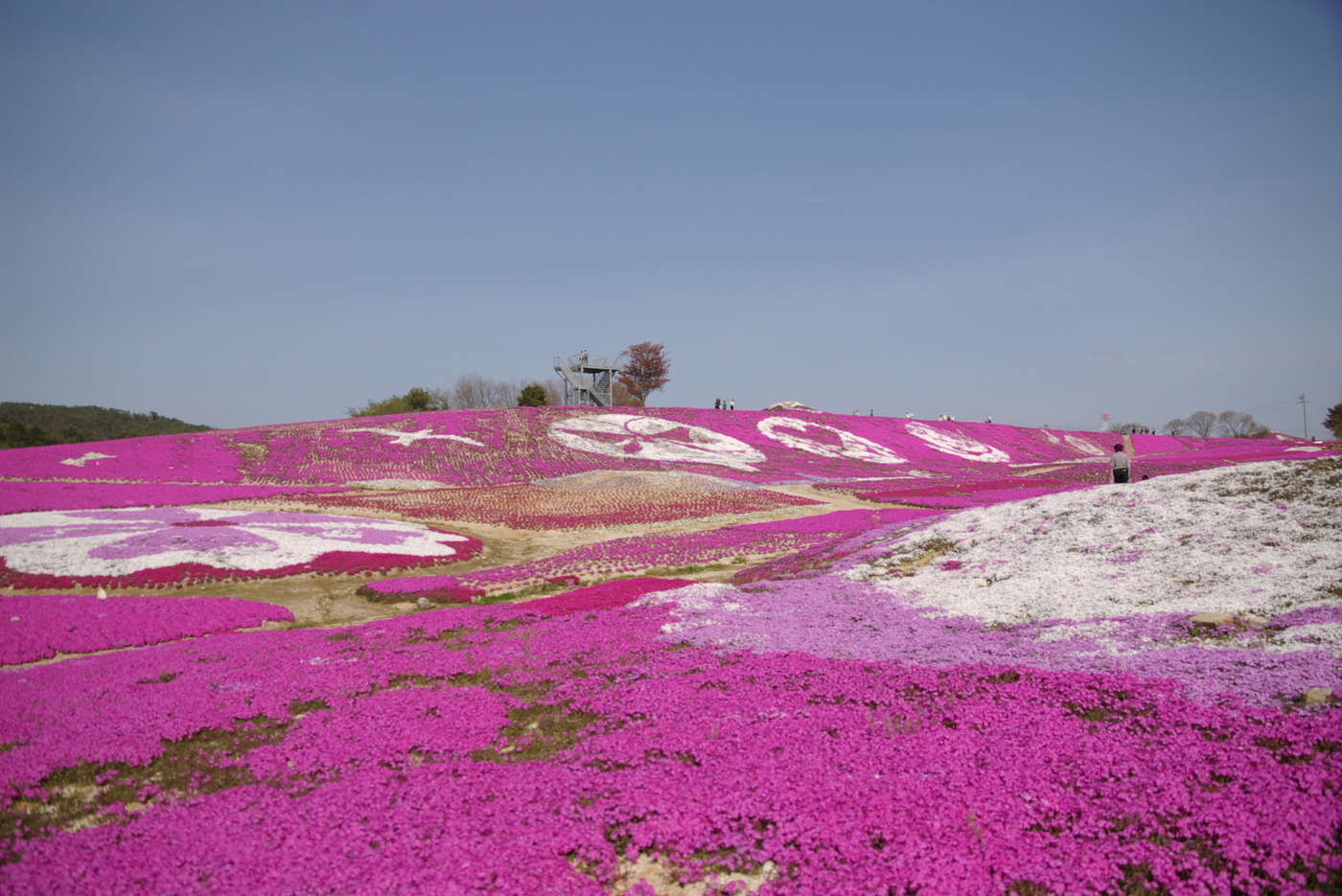
Fields in Sera

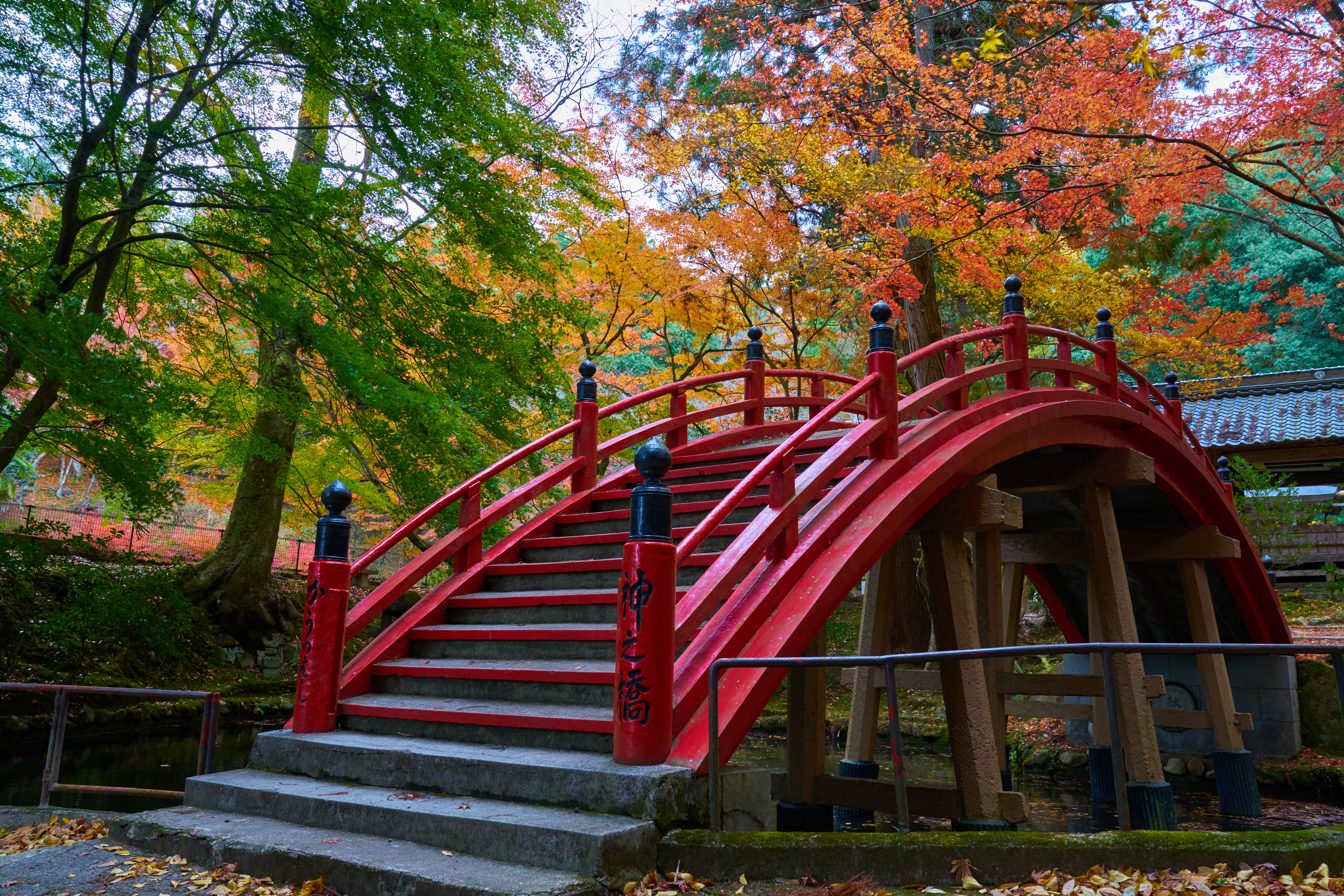
Ryuge-ji temple in Sera

Sera (世羅町, Sera-chō) is a town located in Sera District, Hiroshima Prefecture, Japan. As of 31 March 2023, the town had an estimated population of 15,070 in 6809 households and a population density of 63 persons per km^{2}. The total area of the town is 278.14 square kilometres (107.39 sq mi).

== Geography ==
Sera is located in east-central Hiroshima Prefecture.

=== Adjoining municipalities ===
Hiroshima Prefecture

- Fuchū
- Higashihiroshima
- Mihara
- Miyoshi
- Onomichi

=== Climate ===
Sera has a humid subtropical climate (Köppen climate classification Cfa) characterized by cool to mild winters and hot, humid summers. The average annual temperature in Sera is 12.9 °C (55.2 °F). The average annual rainfall is 1,335.5 mm (52.58 in) with July as the wettest month. The temperatures are highest on average in August, at around 25.2 °C (77.4 °F), and lowest in January, at around 1.4 °C (34.5 °F). The highest temperature ever recorded in Sera was 37.4 °C (99.3 °F) on 7 August 1994 and 3 August 2026; the coldest temperature ever recorded was −14.0 °C (6.8 °F) on 31 January 1985.

Climate data for Sera (1991−2020 normals, extremes 1977−present)
Month	Jan	Feb	Mar	Apr	May	Jun	Jul	Aug	Sep	Oct	Nov	Dec	Year
Record high °C (°F)	16.5 (61.7)	19.9 (67.8)	24.0 (75.2)	29.0 (84.2)	32.0 (89.6)	34.6 (94.3)	36.5 (97.7)	37.4 (99.3)	35.7 (96.3)	30.4 (86.7)	25.8 (78.4)	20.0 (68.0)	37.4 (99.3)
Mean daily maximum °C (°F)	6.5 (43.7)	7.9 (46.2)	12.0 (53.6)	18.0 (64.4)	23.0 (73.4)	25.7 (78.3)	29.4 (84.9)	30.8 (87.4)	26.6 (79.9)	20.8 (69.4)	14.8 (58.6)	8.9 (48.0)	18.7 (65.6)
Daily mean °C (°F)	1.4 (34.5)	2.3 (36.1)	5.7 (42.3)	11.4 (52.5)	16.6 (61.9)	20.5 (68.9)	24.4 (75.9)	25.2 (77.4)	21.0 (69.8)	14.6 (58.3)	8.6 (47.5)	3.4 (38.1)	12.9 (55.3)
Mean daily minimum °C (°F)	−2.9 (26.8)	−2.6 (27.3)	−0.1 (31.8)	4.9 (40.8)	10.6 (51.1)	15.9 (60.6)	20.4 (68.7)	20.9 (69.6)	16.5 (61.7)	9.4 (48.9)	3.2 (37.8)	−1.1 (30.0)	7.9 (46.3)
Record low °C (°F)	−14.0 (6.8)	−14.0 (6.8)	−9.9 (14.2)	−5.2 (22.6)	−0.4 (31.3)	7.0 (44.6)	10.8 (51.4)	12.4 (54.3)	3.6 (38.5)	−1.9 (28.6)	−4.9 (23.2)	−10.6 (12.9)	−14.0 (6.8)
Average precipitation mm (inches)	45.5 (1.79)	53.9 (2.12)	94.8 (3.73)	105.6 (4.16)	128.4 (5.06)	181.8 (7.16)	226.3 (8.91)	124.5 (4.90)	155.8 (6.13)	101.7 (4.00)	61.6 (2.43)	55.7 (2.19)	1,335.5 (52.58)
Average precipitation days (≥ 1.0 mm)	8.0	8.6	10.5	9.8	9.7	11.7	11.0	8.5	9.6	7.4	6.6	8.2	109.6
Mean monthly sunshine hours	115.0	121.3	161.5	182.7	203.4	143.0	156.8	188.2	147.7	162.2	137.5	122.0	1,837.1
Source: Japan Meteorological Agency

=== Demographics ===
Per Japanese census data, the population of Sera in 2020 is 15,125 people. Sera has been conducting censuses since 1960.

Historical population
Year	Pop.	±%
1960	30,810	—
1965	27,028	−12.3%
1970	24,384	−9.8%
1975	23,063	−5.4%
1980	22,483	−2.5%
1985	22,306	−0.8%
1990	21,684	−2.8%
1995	20,735	−4.4%
2000	19,690	−5.0%
2005	18,866	−4.2%
2010	17,550	−7.0%
2015	16,337	−6.9%
2020	15,125	−7.4%
Sera population statistics

== History ==
The area of Sera was part of an ancient Bingo Province. For the Heian period, Sera was an estate and market town centered on the temple of Ryuge-ji, which belonged to the Shingon center of Mount Koya. The need to make shipments of rice to Mount Koya triggered the construction of a port in Onomichi. During the Edo Period, the area was part of the holdings of Hiroshima Domain and developed as a post town on the Iwami Ginzan Highway. Following the Meiji restoration, the area was organized into villages within Sera District, Hiroshima with the creation of the modern municipalities system on April 1, 1889. The villages of Omi, Nishi-Ota, and Higashi-Ota merged to become the town of Sera on January 10, 1955. On October 1, 2004, the towns of Kōzan and Seranishi, both from Sera District, were merged into the expanded town of Sera. After the merger, the former Sera Town Hall officially closed down and the new town hall is now located in the former town of Kōzan.

== Government ==
Sera has a mayor-council form of government with a directly elected mayor and a unicameral town council of 12 members. Sera, together with the city of Mihara contributes three members to the Hiroshima Prefectural Assembly. In terms of national politics, the town is part of the Hiroshima 6th district of the lower house of the Diet of Japan.

== Economy ==
The economy of Sera is largely agricultural, with matsutake mushrooms, pears, tomatoes, and rice as major crops. Although it has a population of less than 20,000, it is also a transportation hub, so it is the center of commerce in the central Bingo region with large supermarkets, home appliance mass retailers, and home centers. In addition, the highlands in the town are relatively cool in the summer, and are attracting attention as a summer resort because of its convenient transportation.

== Education ==
Sera has four public elementary schools and three public junior high schools operated by the town government, and one public high school operated by the Hiroshima Prefectural Board of Education.

== Transportation ==
=== Railway ===
JR West (JR West) - Fukuen Line

- Bingo-Mikawa

=== Highways ===
- Onomichi Expressway
- National Route 184
- National Route 432

== Noted people from Sera ==
- Kotaka Otsuma, pioneer women's educator
