= Kawasa Station =

Railway station in Fuchū, Hiroshima Prefecture, Japan

Kawasa Station 河佐駅
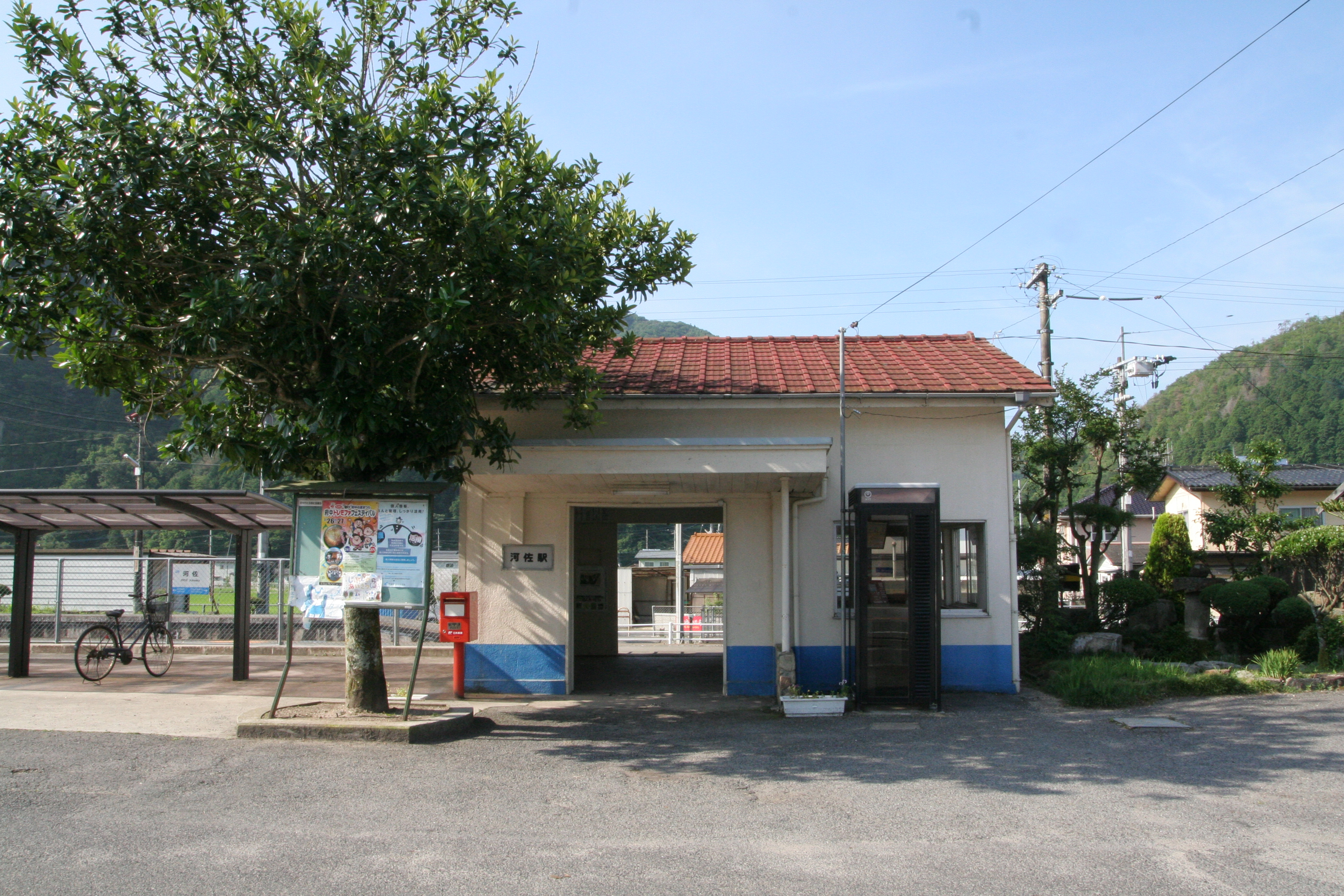
- Kawasa Station, July 2008

General information
- Location: 318-3 Kusa-chō, Fuchū-shi, Hiroshima-ken 729-3222; Japan
- Coordinates: 34°35′23.89″N 133°10′1.49″E
- Owner: West Japan Railway Company
- Operator: West Japan Railway Company
- Line: Z Fukuen Line
- Distance: 34.9 km (21.7 miles) from Fukuyama
- Platforms: 2 side platforms
- Tracks: 2
- Connections: Bus stop

Construction
- Structure type: Ground level
- Accessible: Yes

Other information
- Status: Unstaffed
- Website: Official website

History
- Opened: 28 July 1938

Passengers
- FY2019: 62

Services
| Preceding station | JR West | Following station |
|---|---|---|
| Bingo-Mikawa towards Miyoshi | Fukuen Line Local | Nakahata towards Fukuyama |
Location
- Location within Hiroshima Prefecture Location within Japan

Kawasa Station (河佐駅, Kawasa-eki) is a passenger railway station located in the city of Fuchū, Hiroshima Prefecture, Japan. It is operated by the West Japan Railway Company (JR West).

== Lines ==
Kawasa Station is served by the JR West Fukuen Line, and is located 34.9 kilometers from the terminus of the line at Fukuyama.

== Station layout ==
The station consists of two opposed side platforms, connected to the station building by a level crossing. The station is unattended.

=== Platforms ===
| 1 | ■ Z Fukuen Line | for Fuchū and Fukuyama |
| 2 | ■ Z Fukuen Line | for Miyoshi |

== History ==
Kawasa Station was opened on 28 July 1938. With the privatization of the Japanese National Railways (JNR) on 1 April 1987, the station came under the control of JR West.

== Passenger statistics ==
In fiscal 2019, the station was used by an average of 62 passengers daily.

== Surrounding area ==
- Kasa Gorge
- Hattawara Dam

== See also ==
- List of railway stations in Japan
