= Bingo-Mikawa Station =

Railway station in Sera, Hiroshima Prefecture, Japan

Bingo-Mikawa Station 備後三川駅
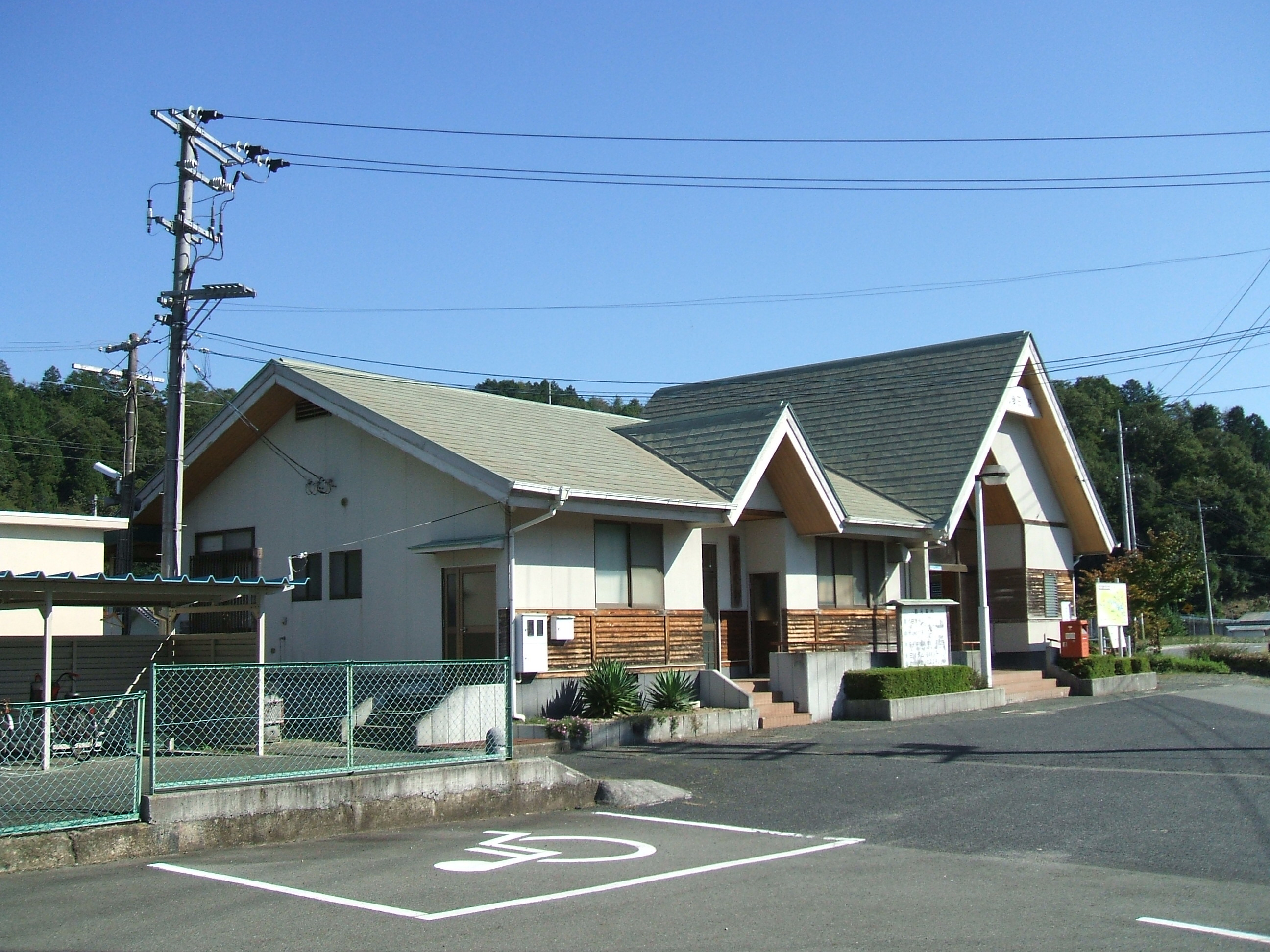
- Bingo-Mikawa Station, October 2007

General information
- Location: Io, Sera-chō, Sera-gun, Hiroshima-ken 729-3307; Japan
- Coordinates: 34°37′48.91″N 133°6′36.28″E
- Owner: West Japan Railway Company
- Operator: West Japan Railway Company
- Line: Z Fukuen Line
- Distance: 42.4 km (26.3 miles) from Fukuyama
- Platforms: 1 side platform
- Tracks: 1
- Connections: Bus stop

Construction
- Structure type: Ground level
- Accessible: Yes

Other information
- Status: Unstaffed
- Website: Official website

History
- Opened: 1 October 1963

Passengers
- FY2019: 18

Services
Preceding station	JR West	Following station
Bingo-Yano towards Miyoshi	Fukuen Line Local	Kawasa towards Fukuyama
Location
- Location within Hiroshima Prefecture Location within Japan

Bingo-Mikawa Station (備後三川駅, Bingo-Mikawa-eki) is a passenger railway station located in the town of Sera, Sera District, Hiroshima Prefecture, Japan. It is operated by the West Japan Railway Company (JR West).

== Lines ==
Bingo-Mikawa Station is served by the JR West Fukuen Line, and is located 42.4 kilometers from the terminus of the line at Fukuyama.

== Station layout ==
The station consists of one side platform serving a single bi-directional track. Due to the construction of the Hattawara Dam, the route from this station to Kawasa Station was changed to a new route via the Hattawara Tunnel, and the Fuchu side of the platform was widened. Although there is a station building, it is unstaffed, and there is no automatic ticket vending machine. The station building is a log house with a pointed roof, and part of the building is used as a meeting place for locals.

== History ==
Bingo-Mikawa Station was opened on 28 July 1938. With the privatization of the Japanese National Railways (JNR) on 1 April 1987, the station came under the control of JR West. The current station building was built in 1990.

== Passenger statistics ==
In fiscal 2019, the station was used by an average of 18 passengers daily.

== Surrounding area ==
- Ashida River
- Mikawa Dam (Ashida River Dam)
- Japan National Route 432

== See also ==
- List of railway stations in Japan
