= Shimo-Kawabe Station =

Railway station in Fuchū, Hiroshima Prefecture, Japan

Shimo-Kawabe Station 下川辺駅
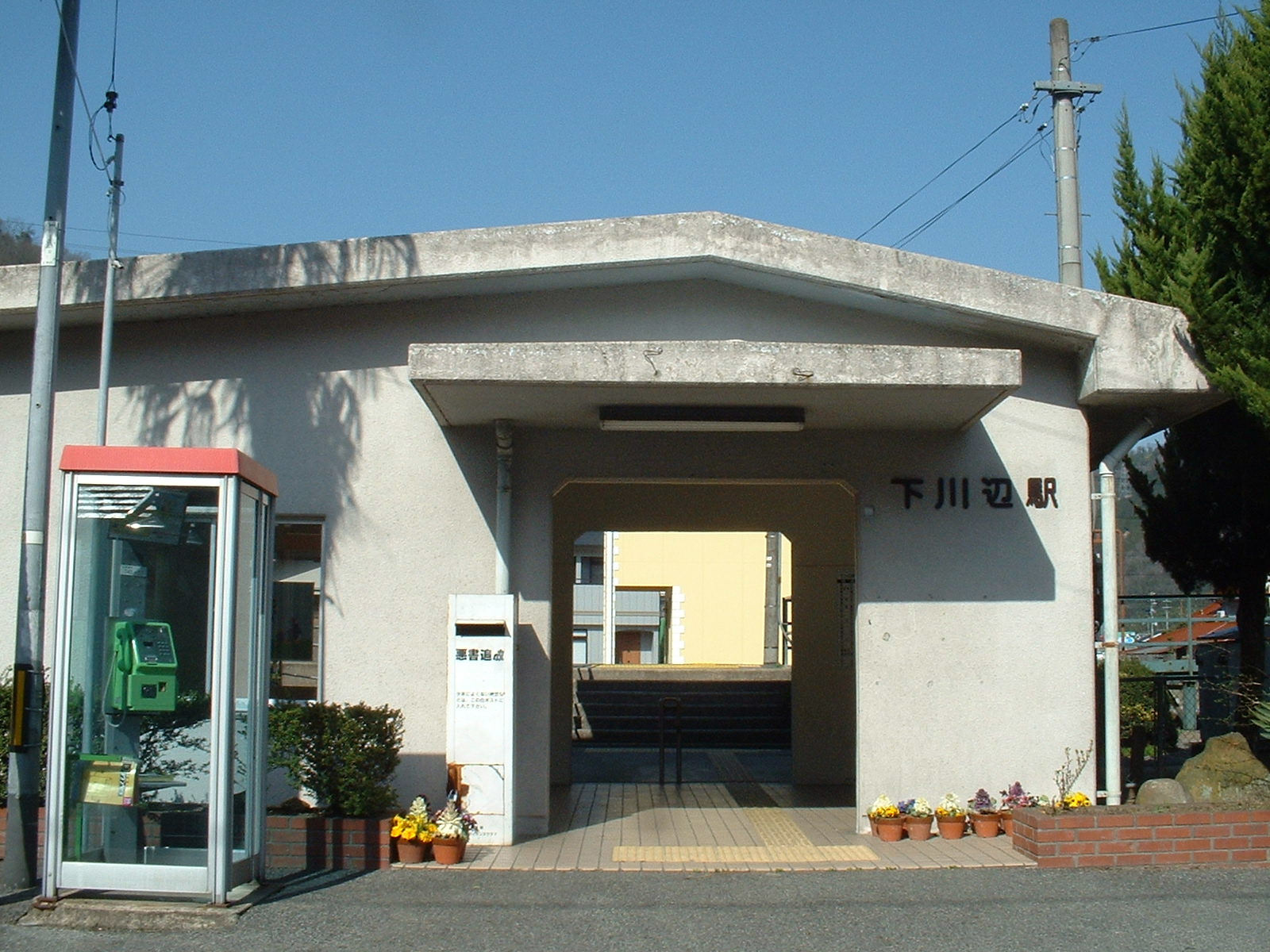
- Shimo-Kawabe Station, March 2006

General information
- Location: Shinone-chō, Fuchū-shi, Hiroshima-ken 726-0027; Japan
- Coordinates: 34°33′14.39″N 133°12′20.12″E
- Owner: West Japan Railway Company
- Operator: West Japan Railway Company
- Line: Z Fukuen Line
- Distance: 27.9 km (17.3 miles) from Fukuyama
- Platforms: 1 side platform
- Tracks: 1
- Connections: Bus stop

Construction
- Structure type: Ground level

Other information
- Status: Unstaffed
- Website: Official website

History
- Opened: 28 July 1938

Passengers
- FY2019: 14

Services
Preceding station	JR West	Following station
Nakahata towards Miyoshi	Fukuen Line Local	Fuchū towards Fukuyama
Location
- Location within Hiroshima Prefecture Location within Japan

Shimo-Kawabe Station (下川辺駅, Shimo-Kawabe-eki) is a passenger railway station located in the city of Fuchū, Hiroshima Prefecture, Japan. It is operated by the West Japan Railway Company (JR West).

== Lines ==
Shimo-Kawabe Station is served by the JR West Fukuen Line, and is located 27.9 kilometers from the terminus of the line at Fukuyama.

== Station layout ==
The station consists of one side platform serving a single bi-directional track. The station is unattended.

== History ==
Shimo-KAwabe Station was opened on 28 July 1938. With the privatization of the Japanese National Railways (JNR) on 1 April 1987, the station came under the control of JR West.

== Passenger statistics ==
In fiscal 2019, the station was used by an average of 14 passengers daily.

== Surrounding area ==
- Japan National Route 486
- Fuchu Municipal Fuchu Myokyo Academy

== See also ==
- List of railway stations in Japan
