= Bingo Provincial Capital =

Archaeological site in Japan

Bingo Provincial Capital Site
- 備後国府跡 (Japanese)
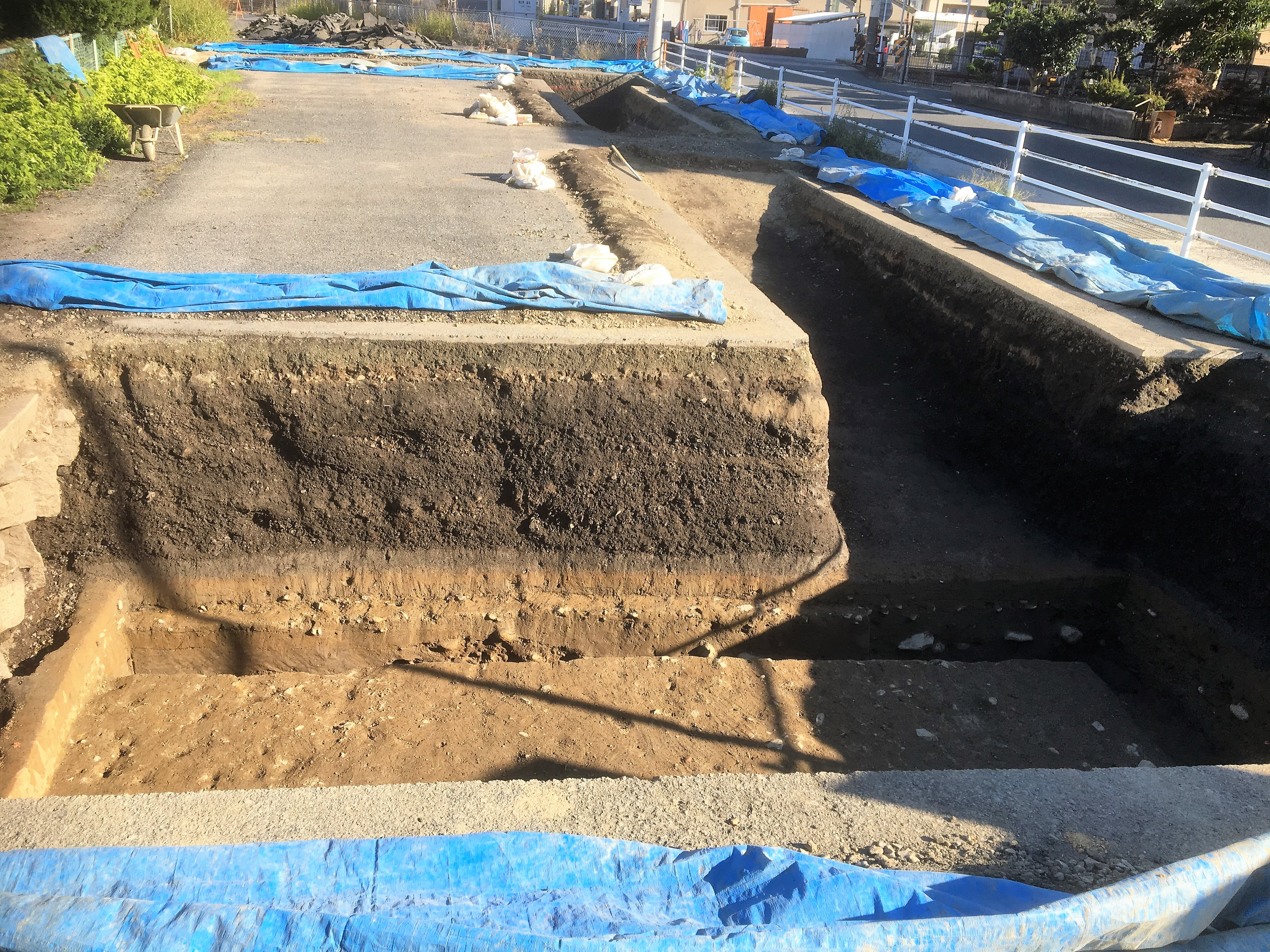
- Bingo Provincial Capital Site

- Bingo Provincial Capital Site Bingo Provincial Capital (Japan)
- 34°34′40″N 133°11′08″E
- Type: Kokufu ruin
- Location: Fuchū, Hiroshima, Japan
- Region: San'yō region

History
- Built: Heian period

Site notes
- Condition: ruins
- Public access: Yes

The Bingo Provincial Capital Site (備後国府跡, Bingo Kokufu ato) is an archaeological site consisting of the ruins of the Nara period to early Heian period Provincial Capital of Bingo Province, located in the northern part of the city of Fuchū, Hiroshima Prefecture in the San'yō region of Japan. The site was designated a National Historic Site of Japan in 1985 with the area under protection expanded in 2016, with the area under protection expanded in 2019.

== Overview ==
Following the Taika Reform (645 AD) which aimed at a centralization of the administration following the Chinese model (ritsuryō), provincial capitals were established in the various provinces, headed by an official titled kokushi, who replaced the older Kuni no miyatsuko. With a square layout, the provincial capitals were patterned after the Capital of Japan, first Fujiwara-kyō and then Heijō-kyō, which in turn were modelled on the Tang capital Chang'an, but on a much, much smaller scale. Each had office buildings for administration, finance, police and military and the official building of the governor, as well as granaries for tax rice and other taxable produce. In the periphery there was the provincial temple (kokubun-ji), and nunnery (kokubun-niji) and the garrison. This system collapsed with the growth of feudalism in the Late Heian period, and the location of many of the provincial capitals is now lost.

The Fuchū Provincial Capital is described in the 10th-century Wamyō Ruijushō as being located in Ashida District of Bingo Province, but its exact location is not mentioned. As a result of over 30 years of research and archaeological excavations starting in 1967, a site in the Motomachi neighborhood of Fuchū was found to contain a concentration of remains and relics that strongly indicate the existence of the provincial capital, although the actual foundations of the central building, the Kokuchō itself, has not yet been found. Excavations have been hampered by the high density of urban development in the area.

Traces of a group of large wooden buildings surrounded by partition ditches, gardens and ponds, warehouses, etc. have been discovered. These structures had a long and narrow shape, which is common in ancient government offices, and were arranged in an orderly manner in the north, south, east, and west directions with fences and ditches. In addition, along with high-grade patterned roof tiles, domestically produced green-glazed pottery, and foreign-made porcelain, and Sue ware products were found. These included items such as inkstones, ceremonial pottery, and copper personal seals used by officials have been excavated, along with a wooden ritual magic object and earthenware with black ink on which the word “gonnosuke”, the title of a provincial governor, was written These artifacts dated from the early Heian period to latter half of the 12th century, but decreased rapidly in the 13th century.

Among the wooden tally strips excavated from the ruins of Heijō-kyō in the early Nara period, a wooden strip with the words “Ashida Village, Ashida District, Bingo Province/Hitaka Shinnomiya Spring Tax” was discovered. Princess Hidaka corresponds to Empress Genshō, and the tally strip suggests that this area (present-day northern part of Fukuyama city to southern part of Fuchu city) was the emperor's private land. All of the excavated areas were backfilled by 2016. There is an information signboard, but at present there no restored buildings or remains that can be visited. The excavated artifacts are stored and displayed at the Fuchu City Museum of History and Folklore (府中市歴史民俗博物館).

== See also ==
- List of Historic Sites of Japan (Hiroshima)
