= Japan National Route 433 =

Road in Hiroshima prefecture, Japan

National Route 433
- 国道433号
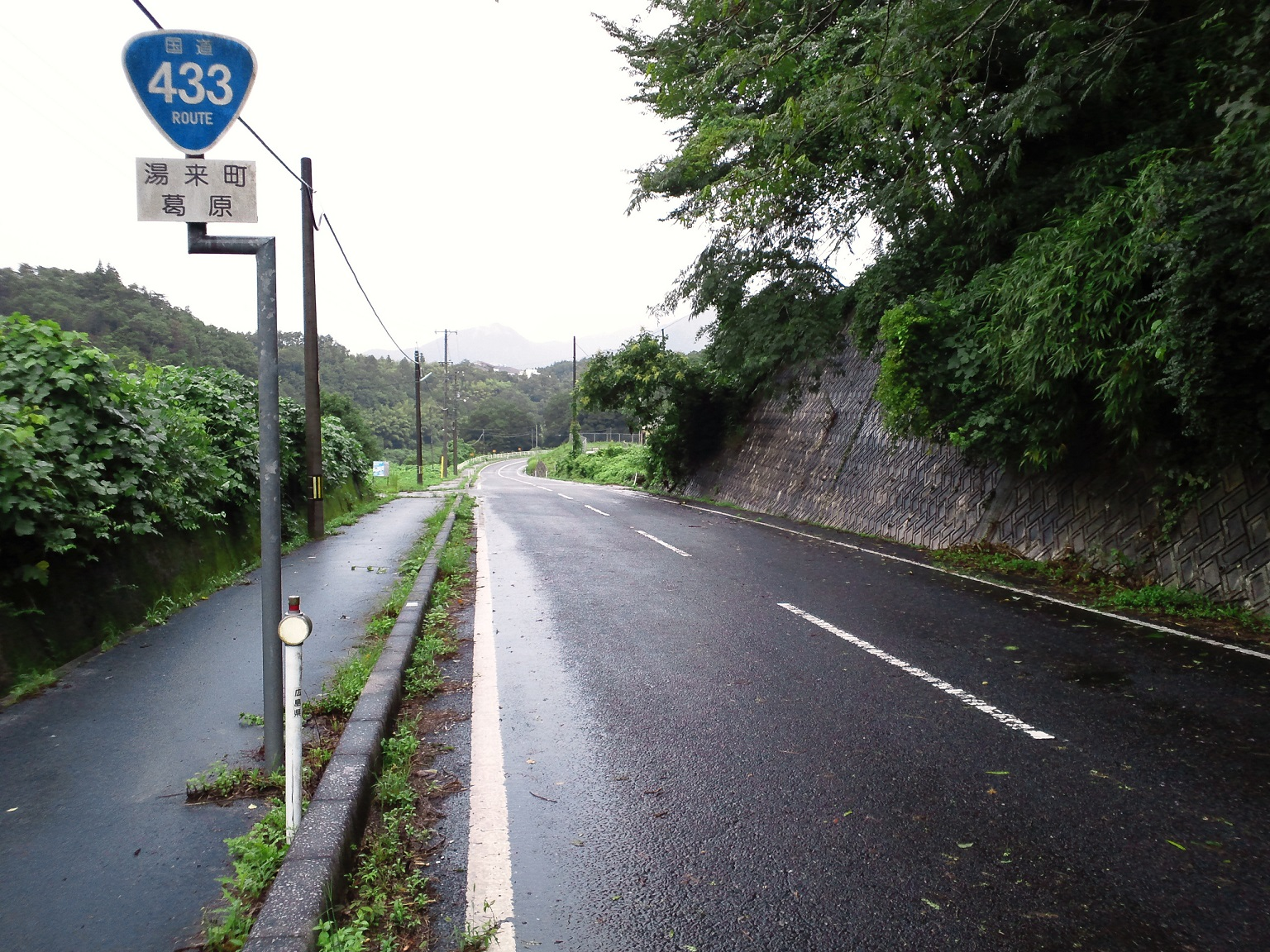

Route information
- Length: 130.5 km (81.1 mi)

Location
- Country: Japan

Highway system
- National highways of Japan; Expressways of Japan
← National Route 432	→ National Route 434

National Route 433 is a national highway of Japan connecting Ōtake, Hiroshima and Miyoshi, Hiroshima in Japan, with a total length of 130.5 km (81.09 mi).
