= Seranishi, Hiroshima =

Dissolved municipality in Hiroshima prefecture, Japan

Seranishi (世羅西町, Seranishi-chō) was a town located in Sera District, Hiroshima Prefecture, Japan.

== Population ==
As of 2003, the town had an estimated population of 3,919 and a density of 56.68 persons per km^{2}. The total area was 69.14 km^{2}.

== History ==
On October 1, 2004, Seranishi, along with the town of Kōzan (also from Sera District), was merged into the expanded town of Sera and no longer exists as an independent municipality.
