= Kōzan, Hiroshima =

Dissolved municipality in Hiroshima prefecture, Japan

Kōzan (甲山町, Kōzan-chō) was a town located in Sera District, Hiroshima Prefecture, Japan.

As of 2003, the town had an estimated population of 6,732 and a density of 67.46 persons per km^{2}. The total area was 99.79 km^{2}.

On October 1, 2004, Kōzan, along with the town of Seranishi (also from Sera District), was merged into the expanded town of Sera and no longer exists as an independent municipality.
