= Sera District, Hiroshima =

District in Hiroshima prefecture, Japan

Coordinates: 34.615°N 133.009°E

Location of Sera District in Hiroshima Prefecture

Sera (世羅郡, Sera-gun) is a district located in Hiroshima Prefecture, Japan.

As of 2020, the district has an estimated population of 15,125 and a density of 54.38 persons per km^{2}. The total area is 278.1 km^{2}.

== Towns and villages ==
- Sera

== Merger ==
- On October 1, 2004 all three towns in the district merged into the single expanded town of Sera. The other two former towns were Kōzan and Seranishi.
