= Nakahata Station =

Railway station in Fuchū, Hiroshima Prefecture, Japan

Nakahata Station 中畑駅
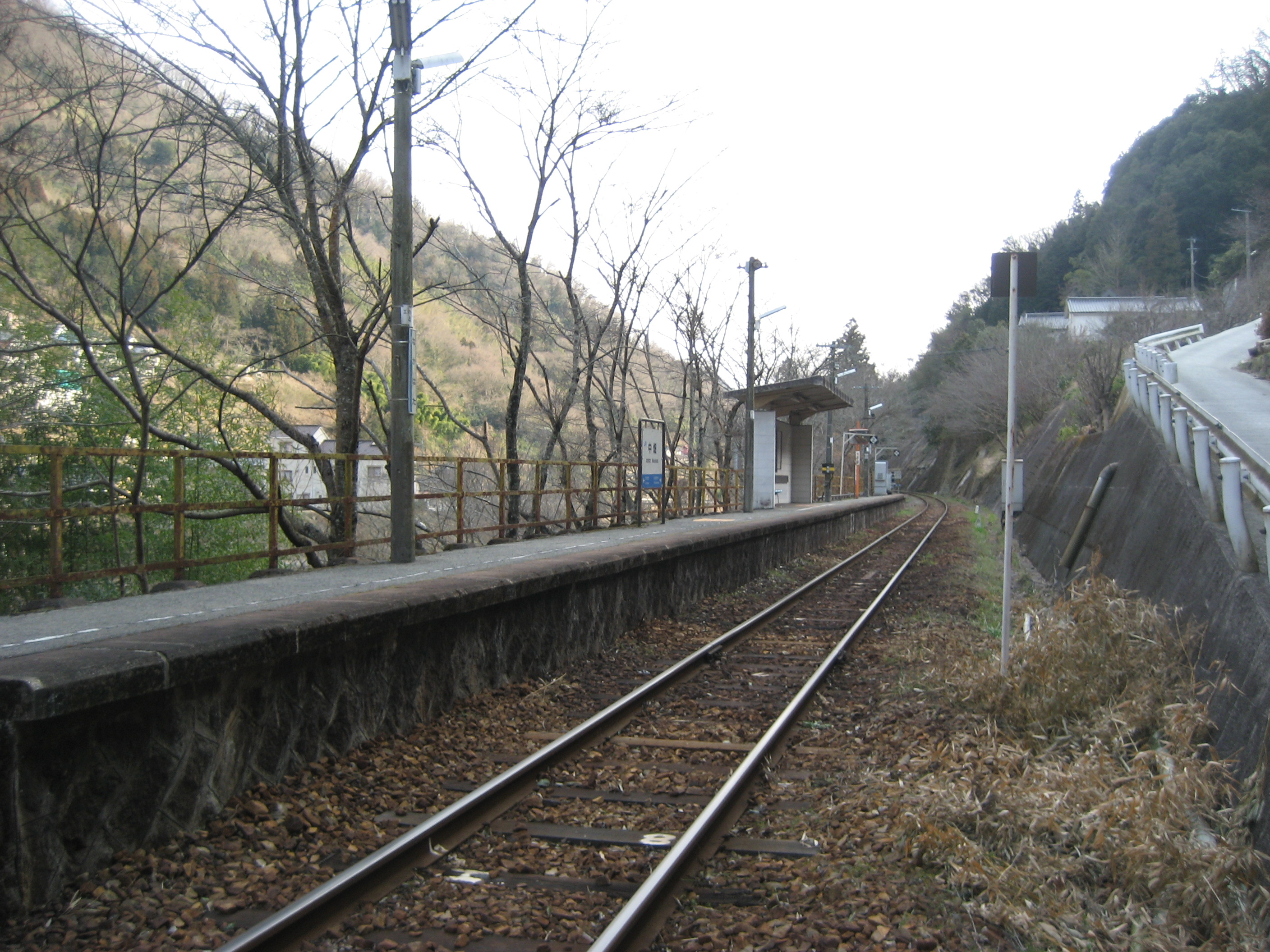
- Nakahata Station, March 2008

General information
- Location: 441-2 Nakahata, Kawasa-chō, Fuchū-shi, Hiroshima-ken 729-3221; Japan
- Coordinates: 34°34′56.33″N 133°11′36.02″E
- Owner: West Japan Railway Company
- Operator: West Japan Railway Company
- Line: Z Fukuen Line
- Distance: 31.8 km (19.8 miles) from Fukuyama
- Platforms: 1 side platform
- Tracks: 1
- Connections: Bus stop

Construction
- Structure type: Ground level

Other information
- Status: Unstaffed
- Website: Official website

History
- Opened: 1 October 1963

Passengers
- FY2019: 1

Services
Preceding station	JR West	Following station
Kawasa towards Miyoshi	Fukuen Line Local	Shimo-Kawabe towards Fukuyama
Location
- Location within Hiroshima Prefecture Location within Japan

Nakahata Station (中畑駅, Nakahata-eki) is a passenger railway station located in the city of Fuchū, Hiroshima Prefecture, Japan. It is operated by the West Japan Railway Company (JR West).

== Lines ==
Nakahata Station is served by the JR West Fukuen Line, and is located 31.8 kilometers from the terminus of the line at Fukuyama.

== Station layout ==
The station consists of one side platform serving a single bi-directional track. There is no station building and the station is unattended.

== History ==
Nakahata Station was opened on 1 October 1963. With the privatization of the Japanese National Railways (JNR) on 1 April 1987, the station came under the control of JR West.

== Passenger statistics ==
In fiscal 2019, the station was used by an average of 1 passenger daily.

== Surrounding area ==
- Hiroshima Prefectural Road No. 24 Fuchu Upper and Lower Line

== See also ==
- List of railway stations in Japan
