= Fuchū Station (Hiroshima) =

Railway station in Fuchū, Hiroshima Prefecture, Japan

Fuchū Station 府中駅
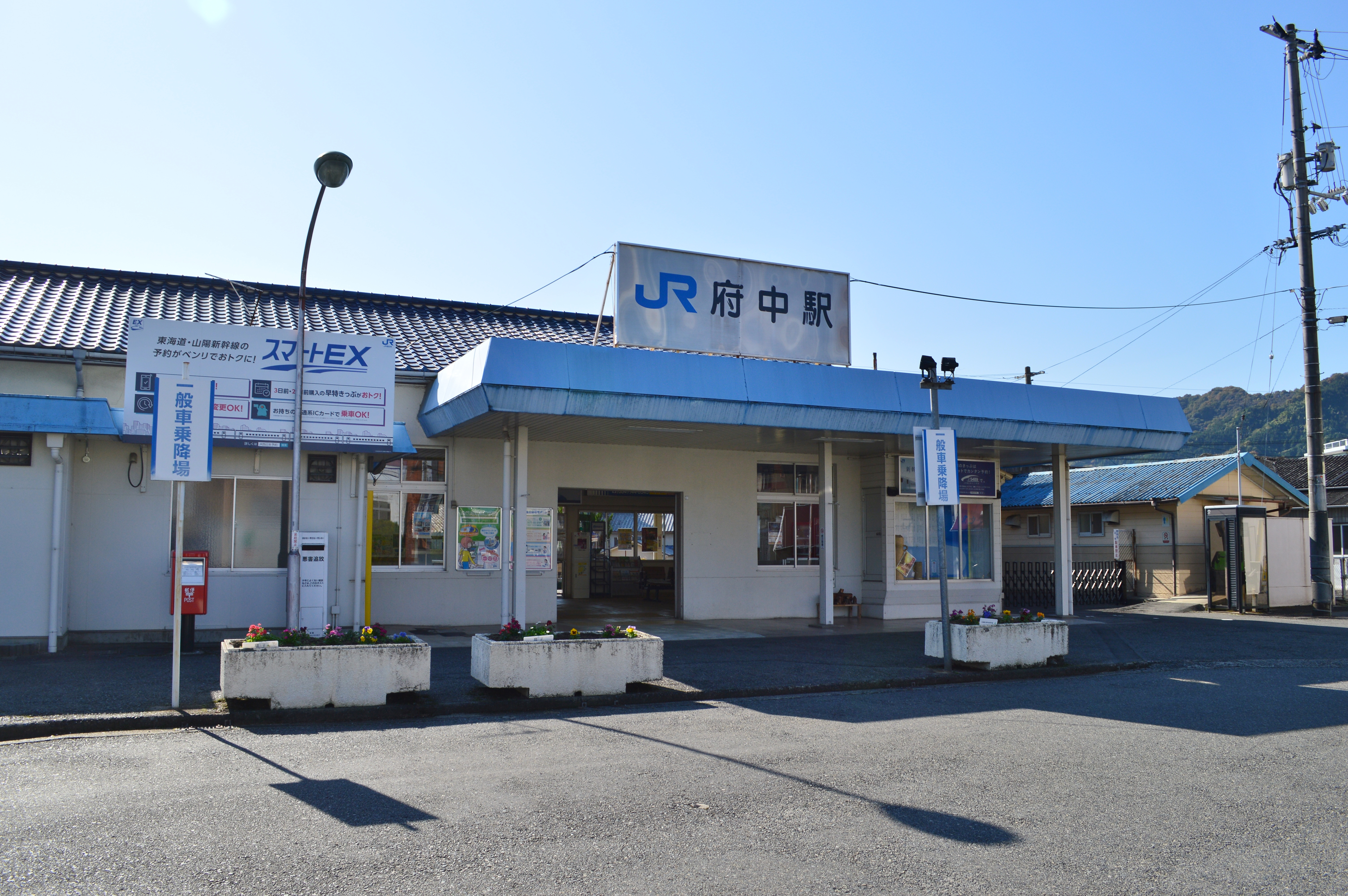
- Fuchū Station, November 2020

General information
- Location: 19 Fukawa-chō, Fuchū-shi, Hiroshima-ken 726-0004; Japan
- Coordinates: 34°34′17.93″N 133°14′9.68″E
- Owner: West Japan Railway Company
- Operator: West Japan Railway Company
- Line: Z Fukuen Line
- Distance: 23.6 km (14.7 miles) from Fukuyama
- Platforms: 1 side + 1 island platforms
- Tracks: 4
- Connections: Bus stop

Construction
- Structure type: Ground level
- Accessible: Yes

Other information
- Status: Unstaffed
- Website: Official website

History
- Opened: 21 July 1914

Passengers
- FY2019: 921

Services
Preceding station	JR West	Following station
Shimo-Kawabe towards Miyoshi	Fukuen Line Local	Ukai towards Fukuyama
Location
- Location within Hiroshima Prefecture Location within Japan

Fuchū Station (府中駅, Fuchū-eki) is a passenger railway station located in the city of Fuchū, Hiroshima Prefecture, Japan. It is operated by the West Japan Railway Company (JR West).

== Lines ==
Fuchū Station is served by the JR West Fukuen Line, and is located 23.6 kilometers from the terminus of the line at Fukuyama.

== Station layout ==
The station consists of two platforms and four tracks: a notched side platform for Platform 1, the remainder of the side platform on Platform 2, and an island platform on Platforms 3 and 4 connected by a footbridge. Platforms 1 and 4 in the direction of Shiomachi are dead ends, and are used by trains returning from the direction of Fukuyama. During normal operation, only Platforms 1 and 2 are used. The station building is a small wooden structure with a tiled roof that has been refurbished. On the Fukuen Line, it is the only station other than Fukuyama Station that has a departure information board. The station is staffed.

=== Platforms ===
1	■ Z Fukuen Line	for Fukuyama
2	■ Z Fukuen Line	for Miyoshi; For Fukuyama
3	■ Z Fukuen Line	for Miyoshi
4	■ Z Fukuen Line	for Fukuyama (morning peak hours only)

== History ==
Fuchū Station was opened on 21 July 1914 as Fuchūmachi Station (府中町駅). It was renamed 20 December 1956. With the privatization of the Japanese National Railways (JNR) on 1 April 1987, the station came under the control of JR West.

== Passenger statistics ==
In fiscal year 2019, the station was used by an average of 921 passengers daily.

== Surrounding area ==
- Fuchū City Hall
- Fuchu Municipal Fuchu Junior High School/Fuchu Elementary School (Fuchu Gakuen)
- Fuchu Post Office
- Fuchu City Library
- Fuchu Chamber of Commerce and Industry
- Fuchu Cultural Center
- Fuchu Municipal Minami Elementary School

== See also ==
- List of railway stations in Japan
