= Japan National Route 432 =

Road in Japan

National Route 432
- 国道432号
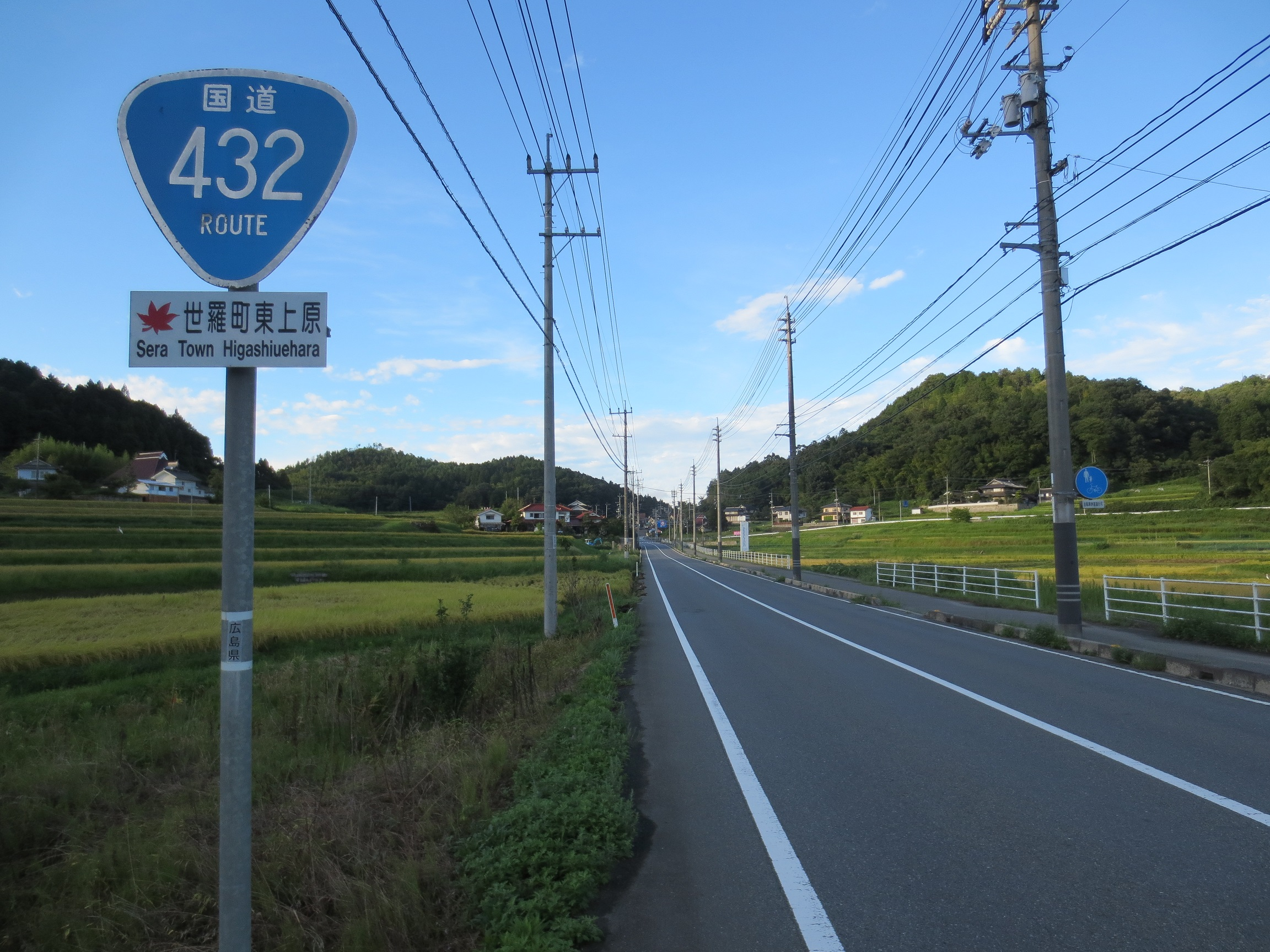

Route information
- Length: 211 km (131 mi)

Location
- Country: Japan

Highway system
- National highways of Japan; Expressways of Japan
← National Route 431	→ National Route 433

National Route 432 is a national highway of Japan connecting Takehara, Hiroshima and Matsue, Shimane in Japan, with a total length of 211 km (131.11 mi).
