= Yadani Kofun =

Yadani Tumulus
- 矢谷古墳 (Japanese)
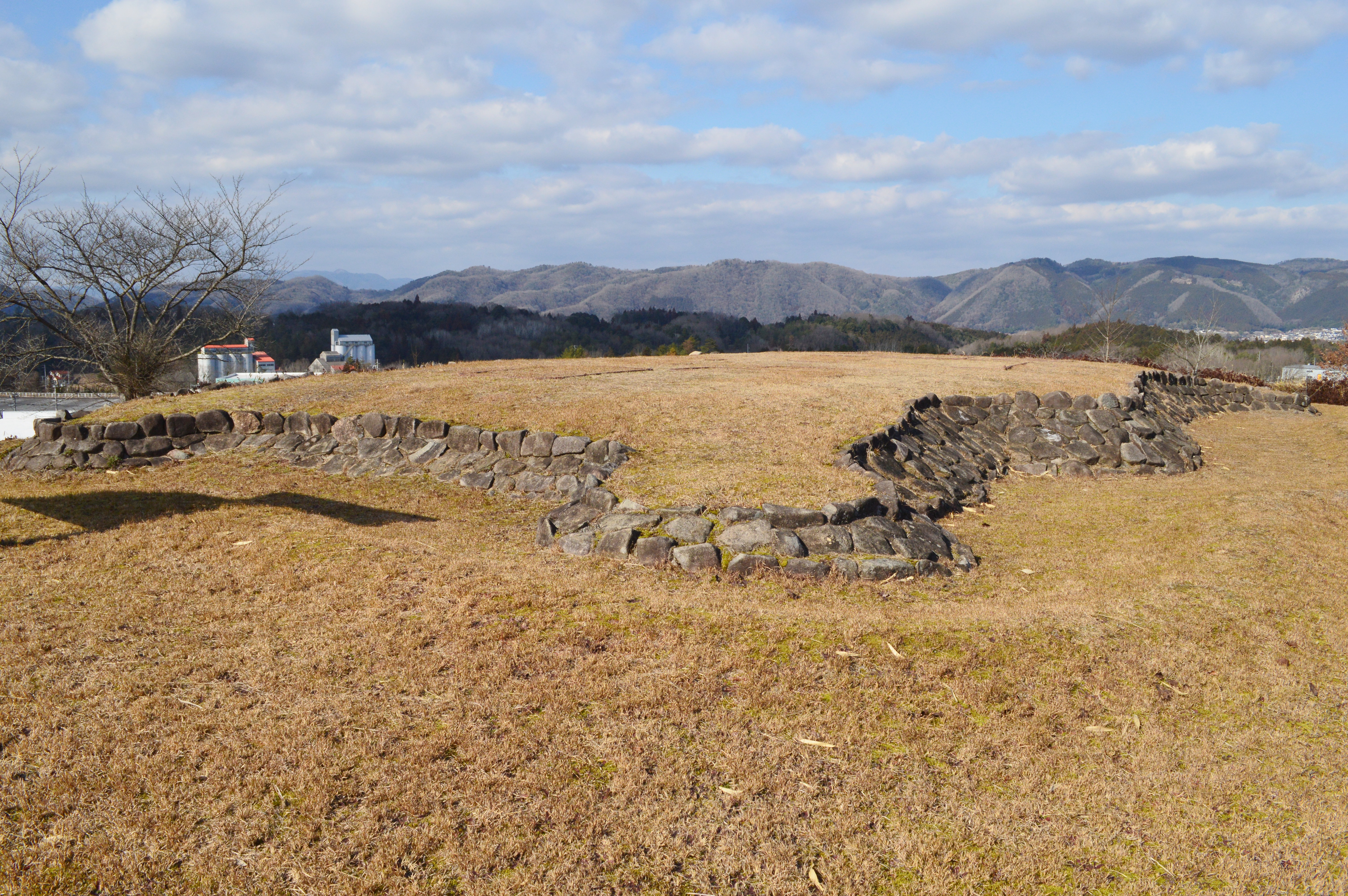
- Yadani Tumulus

- Yadani Tumulus Yadani Kofun (Japan)
- Interactive map of Yadani Tumulus
- 34°47′10.64″N 132°52′50.63″E
- Type: burial mound
- Periods: late Yayoi period
- Location: Miyoshi, Hiroshima, Japan
- Region: San'yō region

History
- Built: 3rd century AD

Site notes
- Public access: Yes (no facilities)

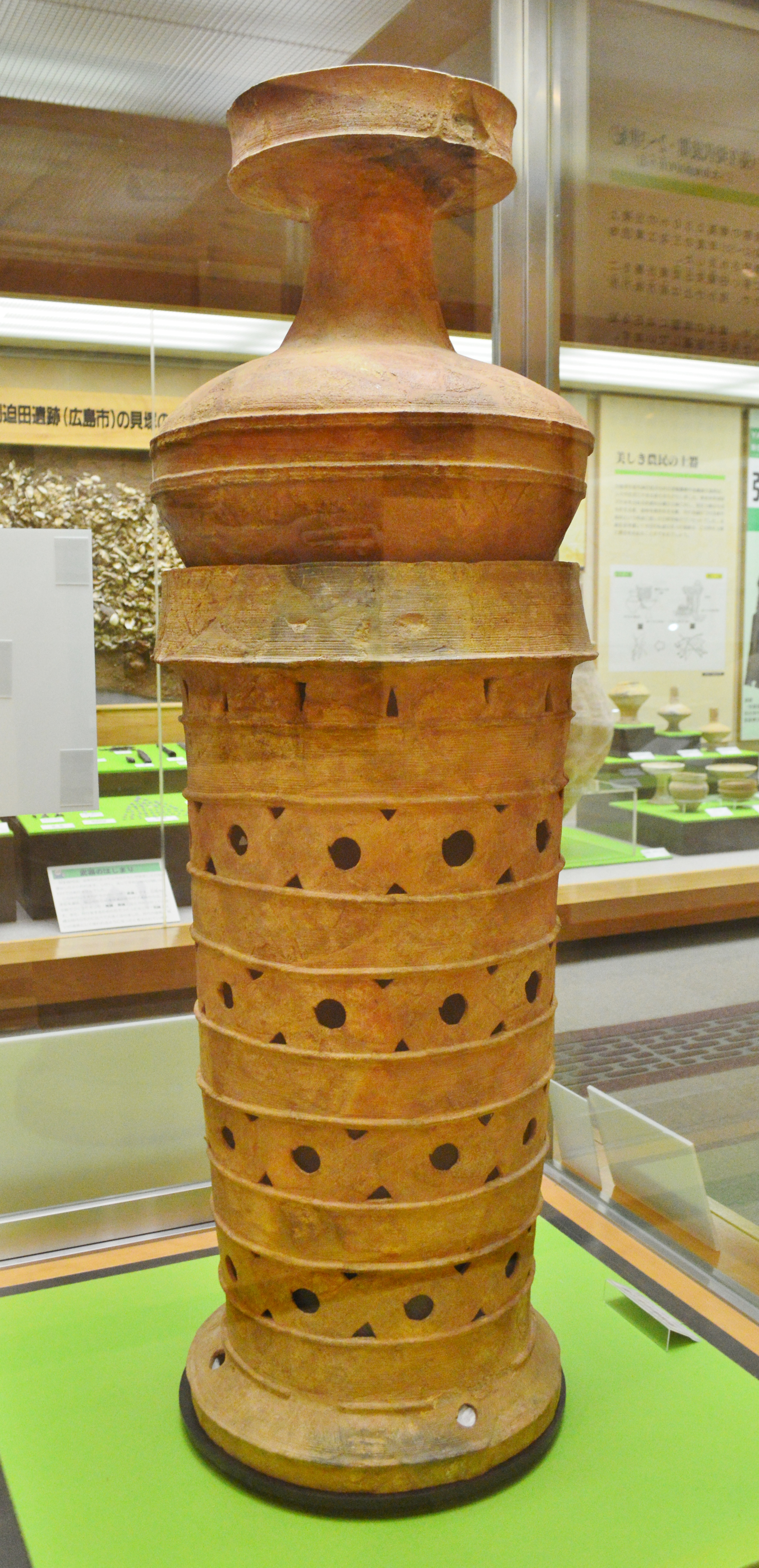
red-lacquered vessel stand from the Yadani Kofun

Yadani Kofun (矢谷古墳) is a Yayoi period burial mound, located in the Higashisakaya neighborhood of the city of Miyoshi, Hiroshima in the San'yō region of Japan. The tumulus was designated a National Historic Site of Japan in 1979. Although it is referred to popularly as a kofun, the Yandani Tumulus predates the Kofun period and its structure has significant differences from burial mounds of the Kofun period.

== Overview ==
Yatani Tumulus is built on a low hill on the south side of the Basen River, which flows into the Miyoshi Basin from the east. It has a total length of 18.5 meters and height of 1.2 meters. The tumulus is located in the midst of the Matsugasakoyaya ruins, a settlement site which was occupied from the Jōmon period through the Kofun period. It was discovered in 1977-1979 during the construction of the Miyoshi Industrial Park.

The style of construction is known as yosumi-tosshutsugata (四隅突出形), which is square or rectangular, with protrusions on each of its four corners; however, it is unique in that it is not a true rectangle, but has a narrow waist, similar to a "two conjoined rectangles" type (zenpō-kōhō-fun (前方後方墳)). The slope of the mound is covered with fukiishi -like stones, with a row of larger stones marking its edge, and is surrounded by a two-meter wide moat. The yosumi-tosshutsugata style is unique to the late middle Yayoi period and is most prevalent in western Japan in areas influenced by the Izumo culture.

The mound was found to contain a total of 11 burials, including seven with wooden coffins, two with box-shaped stone coffins, and an earthen pit burial. The central burial is believed to be one of the wooden coffin burials near the north side of the mound, and jasper tubular beads and small glass beads have been found. A large number of red-lacquered vessel stands and Yayoi pottery have been excavated from the eastern part of the mound and the surrounding moat. These artifacts have been collectively designated a National Important Cultural Property and are stored in the Hiroshima Prefectural Museum of History and Folklore. From these artifacts, Yadani Tumulus is believed to have been constructed from the end of the Yayoi period to the beginning of the Kofun period.

In addition, on the west side of the mound, two square tombs and a Sue ware kiln site from the Kofun period are included within the National Historic Site boundaries. These smaller burial mounds contained seven wooden coffins, and a number of glass beads. Some of the glass beads excavated from these tombs contain natron, and are attracted attention as products of the ancient Roman Empire.

The Hiroshima Prefectural Miyoshi Fudoki no Oka Park with the Jōrakuji-Nanatsuzuka Kofun Cluster is about 3 kilometers away to the south-southeast.

== See also ==
- List of Historic Sites of Japan (Hiroshima)
