= Yokomi temple ruins =

Historic place in Japan

- 横見廃寺跡 (Japanese)
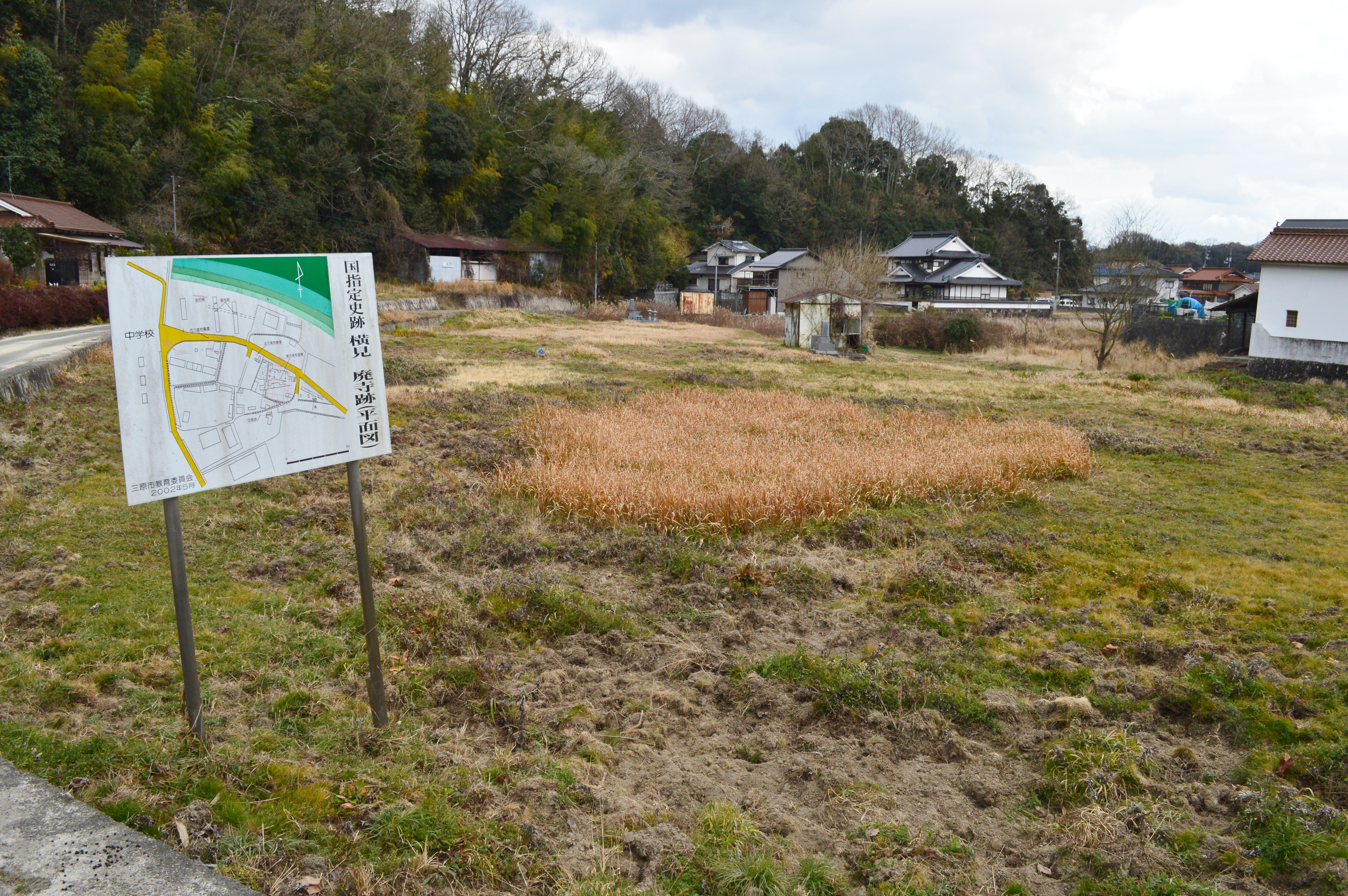
- Yokomi temple ruins

- Yokomi temple ruins Yokomi temple ruins (Japan)
- Interactive map of Yokomi temple ruins
- 34°24′26.6″N 132°58′08.6″E
- Type: temple ruins
- Periods: Nara period
- Location: Mihara, Hiroshima, Japan
- Region: San'yō region

History
- Built: 7th century AD

Site notes
- Public access: Yes (no facilities)

Yokomi temple ruins (横見廃寺跡, Yokomi haiji ato) is an archaeological site with the ruins of a Nara period Buddhist temple located in the Hongō neighborhood of the city of Mihara, Hiroshima, Japan. It was designated as a National Historic Site in 1978.

== History ==
The Yokomi ruins are located at the northwestern foot of the mountains in the eastern part of Hiroshima Prefecture, where the Nashiwa River joins the Nuta River. The existence of an ancient temple ruins has been known from ancient roof tiles that have been excavated from a field on the east side of the current Municipal Hongō Junior High School. The temple name 'Yokomi' come from local folklore that there was once a temple named 'Yokomi-dera' at this location, but the temple is not mentioned in any historical documentation, so its actual name and history are unknown. An archaeological excavation was conducted by the Hiroshima Prefectural Board of Education from 1971 to 1973. The foundations of the lecture hall, pagoda, and surrounding enclosure were discovered during the excavation. The lecture hall was a 7 x 4 bay building measuring 25.5 by 15.1 meters. The area of the temple is thought to be about 100 meters from east-to-west and about 80 meters from north-to-south. The total layout, including the location of the Main Hall is unclear, but evidence indicates that the temple had a peculiar layout in that it was orientated to the west rather than the south. A large number of roof tiles with the design of snowflakes have been excavated. This six-petal snowflake pattern has also been found at the site of the Yamato Wakakusa temple ruin, as well as at the Yamada-dera in Asuka, Nara. Various others patterns of tiles, including single petal lotus pattern (also known as a "flame pattern"), are common to roof tiles in the Hakuhō period from the Yamato region. Other artifacts include Sue ware pottery and gilt-bronze ornamental metal fittings. In addition, a large amount of Yayoi pottery from around the first half of the 3rd century was found in the lower layers of the temple site.

According to the results of the excavation, it is currently regarded as the oldest temple in Hiroshima Prefecture, and it seems to have been abolished around the latter half of the Nara period. The Umekidaira Kofun and Mitoshiro Kofun are located in the surrounding area suggested that there was exchange between the Yamato Kingdom in the Kinai region and the local ruling family.

The site is approximately 2.5 kilometers west from JR West Hongō Station. Artifacts from the site are exhibited at the Hiroshima Prefectural Museum of History and Folklore.

== Gallery ==
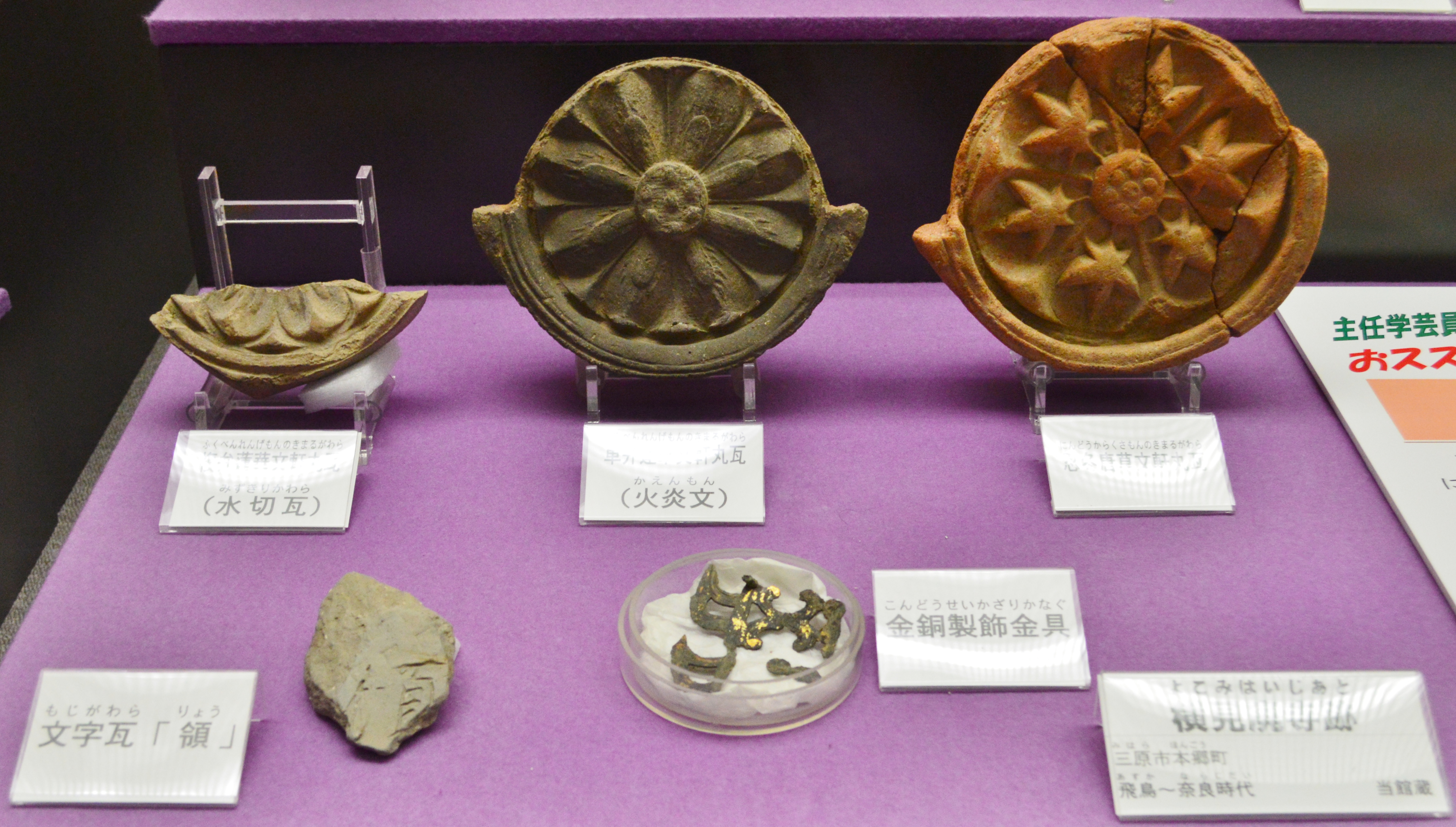

== See also ==
- List of Historic Sites of Japan (Hiroshima)
