= List of places of scenic beauty of Japan (Hiroshima) =

This list is of the places of scenic beauty of Japan located within the Prefecture of Hiroshima.

== National Places of Scenic Beauty ==
As of 1 August 2014, nine sites have been designated at a national level (including two *Special Places of Scenic Beauty).

Site	Municipality	Comments	Image	Coordinates	Type	Ref.
*Itsukushima 厳島; Itsukushima	Hatsukaichi	also a Special Historic Site; Itsukushima Jinja is inscribed on the UNESCO World Heritage List		34°16′16″N 132°18′22″E	8	
*Sandan-kyō 三段峡; Sandan-kyō	Akiōta/Kitahiroshima			34°36′57″N 132°11′44″E	3, 5, 6	
Kikkawa Motoharu Fortified Residence Gardens 吉川元春館跡庭園; Kikkawa Motoharu yakata ato teien	Kitahiroshima			34°43′01″N 132°27′58″E	1	
Former Mantoku-in Gardens 旧万徳院庭園; Kyū-Mantokuin teien	Kitahiroshima			34°43′27″N 132°28′22″E	1	
Shukkei-en 縮景園; Shukukei-en	Hiroshima			34°24′02″N 132°28′04″E	1	
Jōdo-ji Gardens 浄土寺庭園; Jōdoji teien	Onomichi			34°24′44″N 133°12′36″E	1	
Taishaku-kyō 帝釈川の谷 (帝釈峡); Taishaku-gawa no tani (Taishaku-kyō)	Shōbara/Jinsekikōgen			34°50′58″N 133°13′23″E	5, 6	
Peace Memorial Park 平和記念公園; Heiwa kinen kōen	Hiroshima	the Hiroshima Peace Memorial (Genbaku Dome) is inscribed on the UNESCO World Heritage List		34°23′34″N 132°27′09″E	1	
Tomo Park 鞆公園; Tomo kōen	Fukuyama			34°23′01″N 133°23′48″E	1, 8	

== Prefectural Places of Scenic Beauty ==
As of 1 May 2014, seven sites have been designated at a prefectural level.

Site	Municipality	Comments	Image	Coordinates	Type	Ref.
Ishigatani-kyō 石ケ谷峡; Ishigatani-kyō	Hiroshima			34°29′39″N 132°15′40″E		
Yasaka-kyō 弥栄峡; Yasaka-kyō	Ōtake			34°14′00″N 132°09′44″E		
Yoshimizu-en 吉水園; Yoshimizu-en	Akiōta			34°36′41″N 132°19′19″E		
Ryūzu-kyō 龍頭峡; Ryūzu-kyō	Fukuyama			34°33′02″N 132°15′09″E		
Jōsei Falls 常清滝; Jōsei taki	Miyoshi			34°51′48″N 132°43′34″E		
Chiba Family Gardens 千葉家庭園; Chiba-ke teien	Kaita			34°22′24″N 132°32′02″E		
Nikyū-kyō 二級峡; Nikyū-kyō	Kure	also a Prefectural Natural Monument		34°16′56″N 132°38′04″E		

== Municipal Places of Scenic Beauty ==
As of 1 May 2014, sixteen sites have been designated at a municipal level.

== See also ==
- Cultural Properties of Japan
- List of Historic Sites of Japan (Hiroshima)
- List of parks and gardens of Hiroshima Prefecture
