= Miyanomae temple ruins =

Historic place in Japan

- 宮の前廃寺跡 (Japanese)
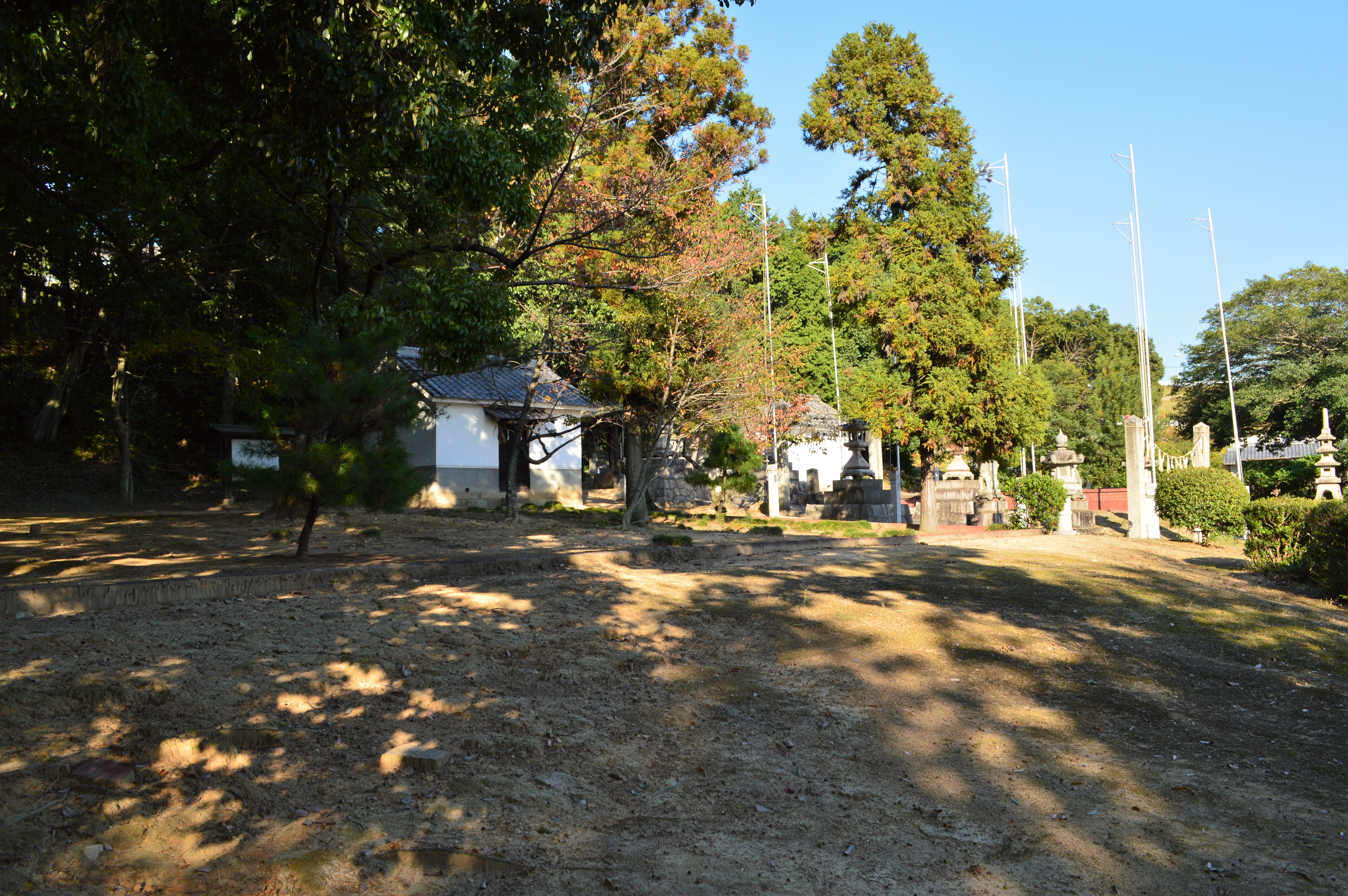
- Miyanomae temple ruins

- Miyanomae temple ruins Miyanomae temple ruins (Japan)
- Interactive map of Miyanomae temple ruins
- 34°30′34.1″N 133°23′46.8″E
- Type: temple ruins
- Periods: Nara period
- Location: Fukuyama, Hiroshima, Japan
- Region: San'yō region

History
- Built: 7th century AD

Site notes
- Public access: Yes (no facilities)

Miyanomae temple ruins (宮の前廃寺跡, Miyanomae haiji ato) is an archaeological site with the ruins of a Nara period Buddhist temple located in the Zaō neighborhood of the city of Fukuyama, Hiroshima, Japan. It was designated as a National Historic Site in 1969.

== History ==
The Miyanomae ruins are located approximately four kilometers northeast of central Fukuyama city, on the south-facing hillside overlooking a bay on the Seto Inland Sea. The site is now within the grounds of a local Shinto shrine, the Zaō Hachiman-gū. According to archaeological excavations conducted in 1950 and 1967, it had a layout patterned after Hoki-ji in Ikaruga, Nara, with a Pagoda in the east and a Kondō in the west. The Kondō was 24.9 meters from east-to-west and 14 meters from north-to-south. and the pagoda was 12.7 meters on each side. Both the pagoda and the Kondō have foundations made of bricks and are in good condition. The excavated relics include several types of roof tiles and fragments of Buddhist statues from the Nara and Heian periods. As the name of the site implies, the name of the temple is uncertain, and currently, the approach to the shrine lies between the ruins of the pagoda and the ruins of the Kondō.

It is believed that the temple was abandoned after a fire towards the end of the Heian period, as no subsequent artifacts have been found. The site is an area called "Bingo Fukatsu-no-sho", a shōen landed estate mentioned in the Nihon Ryōiki, an early Heian period setsuwa collection written between 787 and 824, and in the similarly dated records of the holdings of Hōryū-ji temple, and may have been a temple referred to in those records as "Kaizō-ji". This area was port on the coast of Fukatsu Bay, which prospered as the outer port of the provincial capital of Bingo Province during this period.

== Gallery ==
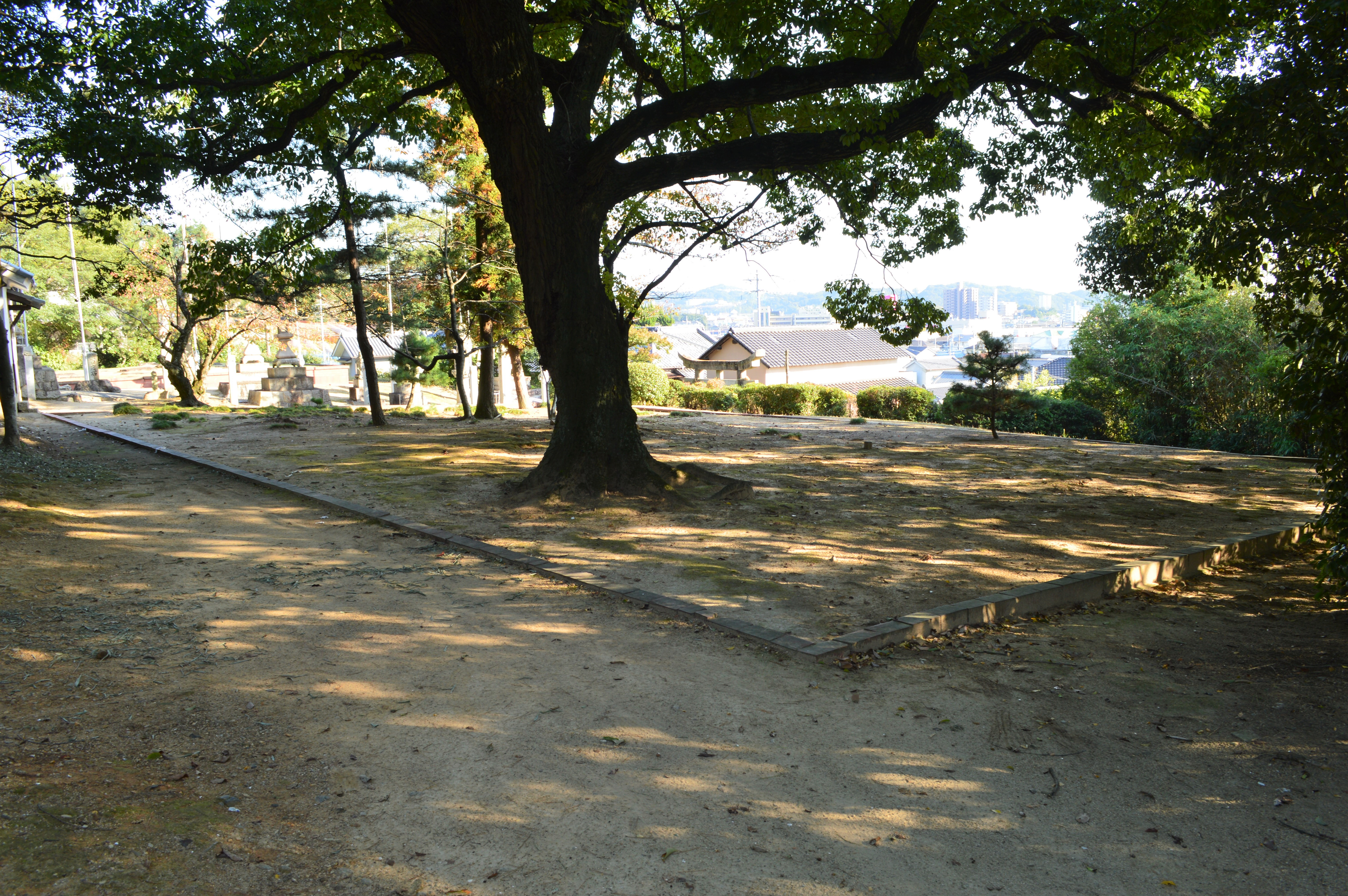
Kondō ruins

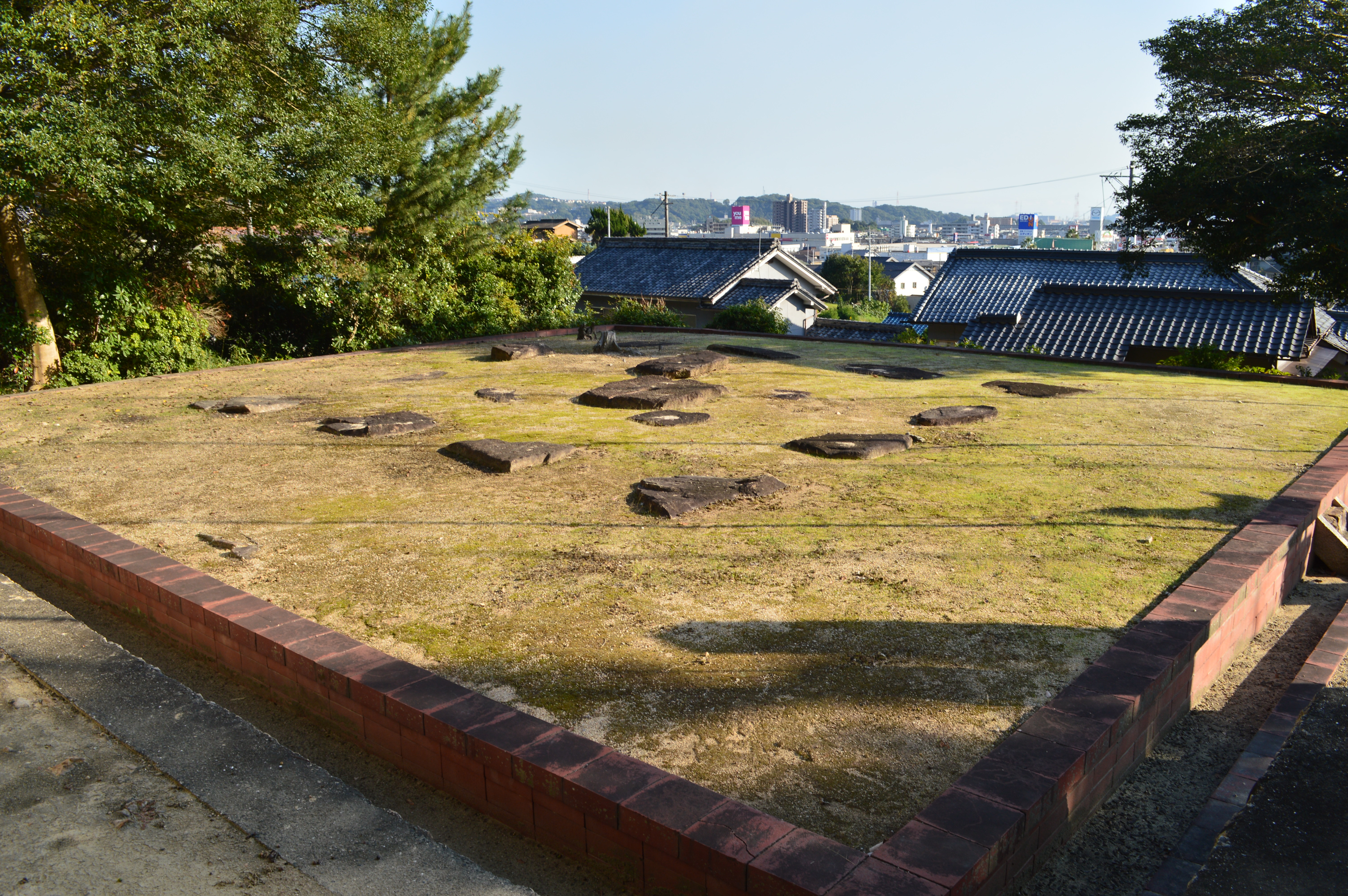
Pagoda ruins

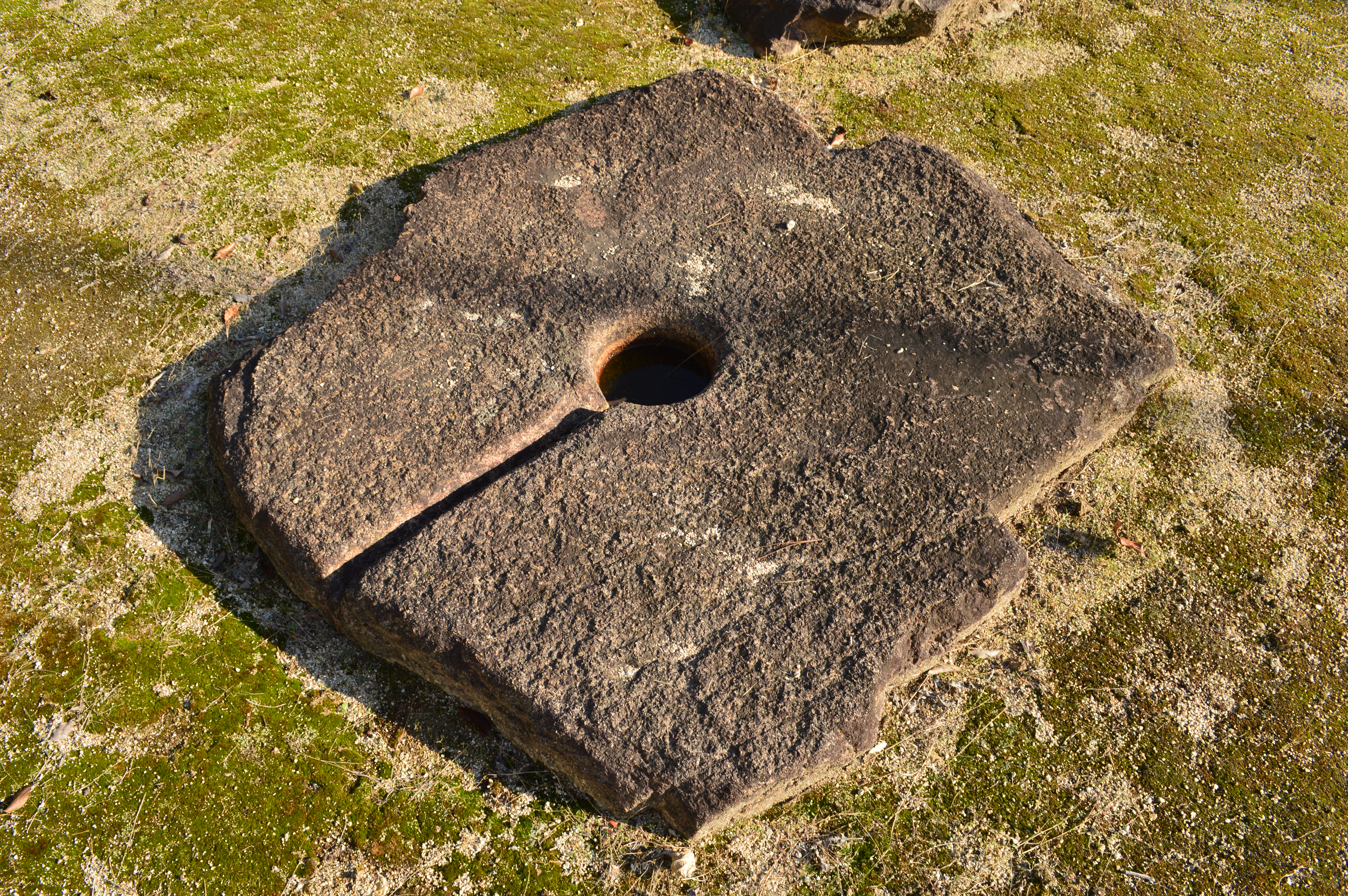
Pagoda central foundation

== See also ==
- List of Historic Sites of Japan (Hiroshima)
