= Nakaoda Kofun Cluster =

Group of burial mounds in Asakita-ku, Hiroshima, Japan

- 中小田古墳群 (Japanese)
- Nakaoda Kofun Clusterer Nakaoda Kofun Cluster (Japan)
- 34°26′50.7″N 132°29′41.5″E
- Type: kofun
- Periods: Kofun period
- Location: Asakita-ku, Hiroshima, Japan
- Region: San'yō region

History
- Built: 4th century AD

Site notes
- Elevation: 10 m (33 ft)
- Public access: Yes
- National Historic Site of Japan

The Nakaoda Kofun Cluster (中小田古墳群, Nakaoda kofun-gun) is a group of Kofun period burial mounds located in the Kuchida-minami neighborhood of Asakita Ward in the city of Hiroshima, in the San'yō region of Japan. The cluster was designated a National Historic Site in 1996.

== Overview ==
The Nakaoda Kofun cluster is a group of 12 burial mounds located on a hilly ridge at an elevation of 60 to 130 meters that spreads from south to north along the left bank of the Ota River. Most of them are round enpun (円墳)-style kofun, but one hotategata kofun (帆立型古墳)-scallop-shaped mound, and one keyhole-shaped zenpō-kōen-fun (前方後円墳) have also been confirmed. An archaeological excavation was conducted in 1979 of the keyhole-shaped tumulus, confirming a total length of about 30 meters. Grave goods found included triangular-rimmed "divine beast" motif bronze mirrors, fragments of armor, iron weapons, beads and other artifacts which date the tomb to the latter half of the early Kofun period (the latter half of the 4th century). Excavation of one of the round tumuli recovered a bronze mirror, a helmet with a hammer, iron swords, (including a ceremonial a meandering blade sword) and other items from the first half of the middle Kofun period (first half of the 5th century). The foundations of three pit dwellings from the Yayoi period, which predate the construction of the tumuli by several centuries, were also discovered.

The excavated artifacts are stored at the Archeology Laboratory of the Faculty of Letters, Hiroshima University and the Hiroshima City Board of Education.

== See also ==
- List of Historic Sites of Japan (Hiroshima)
