= List of historic sites of Japan (Hiroshima) =

This list is of the historic sites of Japan located within the Prefecture of Hiroshima.

== National Historic Sites ==
As of 1 August 2025, thirty-one Sites have been designated as being of national significance (including three *Special Historic Sites); the Joseon Mission Sites span the prefectural borders with Okayama and also include an area of Shizuoka.

Site	Municipality	Comments	Image	Coordinates	Type	Ref.
*Itsukushima 厳島 Itsukushima	Hatsukaichi	island home of the Itsukushima Shinto Shrine, a UNESCO World Heritage Site; also a Special Place of Scenic Beauty	Itsukushima	34°16′16″N 132°18′22″E	2, 3	2315
*Renjuku and Kan Chazan Former Residence 廉塾ならびに菅茶山旧宅 Renjuku narabani Kan Chazan kyū-taku	Fukuyama	Edo Period Confucian academy	Renjuku and Kan Chazan Former Residence	34°32′41″N 133°23′04″E	4, 8	2324
*Genbaku Dome 原爆ドーム (旧広島県産業奨励館) Genbaku dōmu (kyū-Hiroshima-ken sangyō shōreikan)	Hiroshima	former Hiroshima Prefectural Industrial Promotion Hall; UNESCO World Heritage Site	Genbaku Dome	34°23′44″N 132°27′13″E	2	2351
Aki Kokubunji ruins 安芸国分寺跡 Aki Kokubunji ato	Higashihiroshima	provincial temple of Aki Province	Aki Kokubunji ruins	34°26′04″N 132°44′59″E	3	2327
Ichinomiya 一宮 (桜山慈俊挙兵伝説地) Ichinomiya (Sakurayama Koretoshi kyohei densetsuchi)	Fukuyama	Ichinomiya of Bingo Province; the legendary army raising ground of Sakurayama Koretoshi (桜山茲俊) in 1331, featured in the Taiheiki	Kibitsu jinja	34°34′09″N 133°16′17″E	8	2325
Yokomi temple ruins 横見廃寺跡 Yokomi Haiji ato	Mihara	Nara period temple ruins	Yokomi temple ruins	34°24′27″N 132°58′07″E	3	2345
Hanazono Site 花園遺跡 Hanazono iseki	Miyoshi	Yayoi period burial mound cluster		34°47′51″N 132°51′34″E	1	2344
Yosekuraiwakage Site 寄倉岩陰遺跡 Yosekuraiwakage iseki	Shōbara	Jōmon period rock shelter in Taishaku Valley	Yosekuraiwakage site	34°52′12″N 133°12′18″E	1	2340
Kikkawa clan Fortified Residence Sites 吉川氏城館跡 Kikkawa-shi jōkan ato	Kitahiroshima	designation includes the sites of Surugamaru Castle (駿河丸城跡), Ogurayama Castle (小倉山城跡), Hinoyama Castle (日山城跡), and the Kikkawa Motoharu Fortified Residence (吉川元春館跡) (pictured)	Kikkawa Clan Fortified Residence Sites	34°46′16″N 132°29′50″E	2, 3, 7	2349
Miyanomae temple ruins 宮の前廃寺跡 Miyanomae Haiji ato	Fukuyama	Nara period temple ruins	Miyanomae temple ruins	34°30′34″N 133°23′47″E	3	2341
Kagamiyama Castle ruins 鏡山城跡 Kagamiyama-jō ato	Higashihiroshima	Sengoku Period castle	Kagamiyama Castle	34°24′14″N 132°43′39″E	2	3224
Mitoshiro Kofun 御年代古墳 Mitoshiro Kofun	Mihara	Nara period temple ruins	Mitoshiro Kofun	34°23′52″N 132°56′47″E	1	2323
Hiroshima Castle 広島城跡 Hiroshima-jō ato	Hiroshima	Edo period castle	Hiroshima Castle	34°24′06″N 132°27′34″E	2	2332
Mitsujō Kofun 三ツ城古墳 Mitsujō kofun	Higashihiroshima	Kofun period burial mound	Mitsujō Kofun	34°24′59″N 132°44′03″E	1	2347
Teramachi temple ruins 寺町廃寺跡 Teramachi haiji ato	Miyoshi	Nara period temple ruins	Teramachi temple ruins	34°47′39″N 132°55′40″E	3	2348
Kobayakawa clan castle ruins 小早川氏城跡 Kobayakawa-shi shiro ato	Mihara	Sengoku period castle ruins; designation includes the sites of Takayama Castle (高山城跡), Niitakayama Castle (新高山城跡), and Mihara Castle (pictured)	Teramachi temple ruins	34°25′06″N 132°59′01″E	2	2333
Jōrakuji-Nanatsuzuka Kofun Cluster 浄楽寺・七ツ塚古墳群 Jōrakuji-Nanatsuzuka kofun-gun	Miyoshi	Kofun period burial mound cluster	Jōrakuji-Nanatsuzuka Kofun Cluster	34°33′13″N 133°18′44″E	1	2342
Jinyama Tumulus Cluster 陣山墳墓群 Jinyama funbo-gun	Miyoshi	Yayoi period burial mound cluster		34°47′20″N 132°54′29″E	1	3273
Nakaoda Kofun Cluster 中小田古墳群 Nakaoda kofun-gun	Hiroshima	Kofun period burial mound cluster		34°26′49″N 132°29′40″E	1	2352
Futagozuka Kofun 二子塚古墳 Futagozuka kofun	Fukuyama	Kofun period burial mound	Futagozuka Kofun	34°33′13″N 133°18′44″E	1	00003645
Fukuyama Castle 福山城跡 Fukuyama-jō ato	Fukuyama	Edo Period castle	Fukuyama Castle	34°29′26″N 133°21′40″E	1	2337
Mōri clan castle ruins 毛利氏城跡 Mōri-shi shiro ato	Akitakata	designation includes the sites of Tajihi-Sarugake Castle (多治比猿掛城跡) and Yoshida-Kōriyama Castle (郡山城跡) (pictured)	Mōri Clan Castle Sites	34°40′20″N 132°42′33″E	2	2331
Yadani Kofun 矢谷古墳 Yadani kofun	Miyoshi	Kofun period burial mound	Yadani Kofun	34°47′11″N 132°52′51″E	1	2346
Rai San'yō Residence 頼山陽居室 Rai Sanyō kyoshitsu	Hiroshima	incorporated within the Rai Sanyō Shiseki Museum (頼山陽史跡資料館)	Rai San'yō Residence	34°23′29″N 132°27′26″E	8	2328
Joseon Mission Sites 朝鮮通信使遺跡 Chōsen tsushinshi iseki	Fukuyama	Edo Period Joseon Mission Sites; designation includes Fukuzen-ji (福禅寺), Honren-ji (本蓮寺) in Setouchi, Okayama Prefecture, and Seiken-ji in Shizuoka, Shizuoka Prefecture	Bingo Kokufu ruins	34°22′59″N 133°23′00″E	9	3097
Bingo Provincial Capital ruins 備後国府跡 Bingo kokufu ato	Fuchū	Nara period temple ruins	Bingo Kokufu ruins	34°34′40″N 133°14′08″E	2	00003950
Kōtachi Kofun 甲立古墳 Kōtachi kofun	Akitakata	Kofun period burial mound	Kōtachi Kofun	34°42′20″N 132°45′19″E	1	00003933
Shimo-Okada Kanga ruins 下岡田官衙遺跡 Shimo-Okada kanga iseki	Fuchū town	Nara - Heian period regional government complex		34°24′07″N 132°30′29″E	2, 6	00004118
Sata Valley - Sata Pass Tumulus Cluster 佐田谷・佐田峠墳墓群 Sata-dani・Sata-dao funbo-gun	Shōbara			34°52′08″N 133°03′01″E	1	00004146
Hiroshima Atomic Bomb Site 広島原爆遺跡 Hiroshima genbaku iseki	Hiroshima		Hiroshima Atomic Bomb Site	34°23′39″N 132°27′12″E	2	00004189
Saijō Sake Warehouses 西条酒蔵群 Saijō sakagura-gun	Higashihiroshima		Saijō Sake Warehouses	34°25′48″N 132°44′42″E	6	00004190

== Prefectural Historic Sites ==
As of 6 August 2025, one hundred and twenty-five Sites have been designated as being of prefectural importance.

Site	Municipality	Comments	Image	Coordinates	Type	Ref.
Kabutoyama Kofun 兜山古墳; Kabutoyama kofun	Mihara			34°24′08″N 133°00′33″E		
Yano Castle Site 矢野城跡; Yano-jō ato	Hiroshima			34°19′54″N 132°32′32″E		
Himetani Ware Kiln Site 姫谷焼窯跡; Himetani-yaki kama ato	Fukuyama			34°37′47″N 133°18′52″E		
Isonomiya 磯宮; Isonomiya	Takehara			34°20′31″N 132°54′54″E		
Rai Kyōhei Office 頼杏坪役宅; Rai Kyōhei yakutaku	Miyoshi			34°48′45″N 132°50′43″E		
Miyoshi Shazō 三次社倉; Miyoshi Shazō	Miyoshi			34°48′44″N 132°50′43″E		
Kōtokuji Kofun 康徳寺古墳; Kōtokuji kofun	Sera			34°35′18″N 133°01′56″E		
Kumano Ancient Pottery Kiln Site 熊野の古代土器窯跡; Kumano no kodai doki kama ato	Fukuyama			34°26′04″N 133°19′34″E		
Manpuku-ji Site 万福寺跡; Manpukuji ato	Sera			34°35′27″N 133°00′50″E		
Sennose Joseon Mission Resthouse Site 三ノ瀬朝鮮信使宿館跡; Sannose Chōsen shinshi shukukan ato	Kure			34°11′24″N 132°41′00″E		
Kamagari Guardhouse Site 蒲刈島御番所跡; Kamagari-jima go-bansho ato	Kure			34°11′18″N 132°41′03″E		
Sannose Honjin Site 三ノ瀬御本陣跡; Sannose go-honjin ato	Kure			34°11′17″N 132°41′03″E		
Tomo Seven Exiled Nobles Site 鞆七卿落遺跡; Tomo shichi kyō-ochi iseki	Fukuyama			34°22′59″N 133°22′51″E		
Mitarai Seven Exiled Nobles Site 御手洗七卿落遺跡; Mitarai shichi kyō-ochi iseki	Kure			34°10′47″N 132°51′58″E		
Waka-Ebisuya Site 若胡子屋跡; Waka-Ebisu-ya ato	Kure			34°10′45″N 132°51′59″E		
Hiraga Gennai Seishi 平賀源内生祠; Hiraga Gennai seishi	Fukuyama	seishi are small shrines erected during the honorand's lifetime		34°22′57″N 133°22′38″E		
Kan Chazan Grave 菅茶山之墓; Kan Chazan no haka	Fukuyama			34°32′26″N 133°23′11″E		
Rai Family Grave 頼家之墓; Rai-ke no haka	Hiroshima			34°23′12″N 132°28′19″E		
Shōmoku-ji Site 青目寺跡; Shōmokuji ato	Fuchū			34°35′38″N 133°14′15″E		
Government Cotton Spinning Factory Site 官立綿糸紡績工場跡 kanritsu menshi bōseki kōjō ato	Hiroshima			34°24′43″N 132°37′36″E		
Seishin-ji Jōgahara Stone Tō 棲真寺定ケ原石塔; Seishinji Jōgahara seki-tō	Mihara			34°27′33″N 132°56′32″E		
Mōri Motonari Legendary Birthplace (Suzuo Castle) 毛利元就誕生伝説地（鈴尾城跡） Mōri Motonari tanjō densetsu-chi (Suzuo-jō ato)	Akitakata			34°38′03″N 132°40′07″E		
Mount Hiba Place of Legend 比婆山伝説地; Hiba-yama densetsu-chi	Shōbara	associated with the Mount Hiba that was the burial place of Izanami-no-Mikoto according to the Kojiki		35°04′02″N 133°03′19″E		
Kameyama Yayoi Site 亀山弥生式遺跡; Kameyama Yayoi-shiki iseki	Fukuyama			34°33′26″N 133°21′45″E		
Arifuku Castle Site 有福城跡; Arifuku-jō ato	Fuchū			34°42′50″N 133°06′53″E		
Tenryō Jōge Daikansho Site 天領上下代官所跡; Tenryō Jōge daikansho ato	Fuchū			34°41′38″N 133°07′20″E		
Hisagoyama Kofun 瓢山古墳; Hisagoyama kofun	Shōbara			34°51′37″N 133°01′25″E		
Yoshidera Haiji Site 吉寺廃寺跡; Yoshidera haiji ato	Miyoshi			34°44′58″N 132°58′02″E		
Ueda Konbai Grave 植田艮背之墓; Ueda Konbai no haka	Hiroshima	at Tamon-in (多聞院)		34°23′12″N 132°28′18″E		
Narasaki Masakazu Grave and Related Site 楢崎正員之墓及関係遺跡; Narasaki Masakazu no haka oyobi kankei iseki	Mihara	at Daizen-ji (大善寺)		34°24′21″N 133°04′33″E		
Karasaki Hitachinosuke Grave 唐崎常陸介之墓; Karasaki Hitachinosuke no haka	Takehara					
Kobayakawa Takakage Grave 小早川隆景墓; Kobayakawa Takakage haka	Mihara	at Beisan-ji (米山寺)		34°23′28″N 132°59′59″E		
Mizuno Katsunari Grave 水野勝成墓; Mizuno Katsunari haka	Fukuyama	at Kenchū-ji (Fukuyama) (賢忠寺)		34°29′30″N 133°22′15″E		
Honjō Shigemasa Grave 本庄重政墓; Honjō Shigemasa haka	Fukuyama	at Jōten-ji (承天寺)		34°26′48″N 133°15′49″E		
Tanabe-dera Pagoda Site 田辺寺塔跡; Tanabedera tō ato	Fukuyama			34°29′05″N 133°19′05″E		
Yoshida-dera Site 伝吉田寺跡 den-Yoshidadera ato	Fuchū			34°34′40″N 133°14′08″E		
Terabara Castle - Yotani Castle - Sarubami Castle Sites 寺原・与谷・猿喰城跡; Terabara・Yotani・Sarubami-jō ato	Kitahiroshima			34°40′58″N 132°29′13″E		
Man'yōshū Site Nagatoshima Matsubara (Katsurahama Jinja Precinct) 万葉集遺跡長門島松原（桂濱神社境内） Man'yōshū iseki Nagatoshima Matsubara (Katsurahama Jinja keidai)	Kure			34°06′05″N 132°30′47″E		
Shimosōmenya Ichirizuka 下素麺屋一里塚; Shimosōmenya ichirizuka	Miyoshi			34°43′20″N 132°59′26″E		
Nakayama Ichirizuka 中山一里塚; Nakayama ichirizuka	Miyoshi			34°42′32″N 133°01′26″E		
Miyawaki Stone Age Site 宮脇石器時代遺跡; Miyawaki sekki-jidai iseki	Fukuyama			34°36′09″N 133°15′37″E		
Yamanokami Kofun 山の神古墳; Yamanokami kofun	Fukuyama			34°33′29″N 133°19′27″E		
Ōsako Kofun 大迫古墳; Ōsako kofun	Fukuyama			34°34′01″N 133°18′44″E		
Ōsayama Shiratsuka Kofun 大佐山白塚古墳; Ōsayama Shiratsuka kofun	Fukuyama			34°33′42″N 133°17′40″E		
Kaya-gawa Yayoi Site 神谷川弥生式遺跡; Kaya-gawa Yayoi-shiki iseki	Fuchū			34°33′24″N 133°16′47″E		
Ōta Shell Mound 太田貝塚; Ōta kaizuka	Onomichi			34°25′40″N 133°13′32″E		
Matsumoto Kofun 松本古墳; Matsumoto kofun	Fukuyama			34°27′25″N 133°15′38″E		
Sadamaru Kofun 貞丸古墳; Sadamaru kofun	Mihara			34°24′11″N 132°58′18″E		
Baikihira Kofun 梅木平古墳; Baikihira kofun	Mihara			34°24′30″N 132°57′58″E		
Hijiyama Shell Mound 比治山貝塚; Hijiyama kaizuka	Hiroshima			34°22′50″N 132°28′25″E		
Sadamaru No.2 Kofun 貞丸第二号古墳; Sadamaru ni-gō kofun	Mihara			34°24′11″N 132°58′18″E		
Inoko Kofun 猪ノ子古墳; Inoko kofun	Fukuyama			34°34′29″N 133°20′29″E		
Kumagai Clan Sites 熊谷氏の遺跡; Kumagai-shi no iseki	Hiroshima	designation comprises the sites of Ise-ga-Tsubo (Shio-ga-Tsubo) Castle (伊勢が坪（塩が坪）城跡), Takamatsu Castle (高松城), Doi Yashiki (土居屋敷跡), and Bodai-sho Kannon-ji (菩提所観音寺跡)		34°33′06″N 132°32′46″E		
So-called Kiyomori Mound 伝清盛塚 den-Kiyomori-zuka	Kure			34°11′40″N 132°32′13″E		
Kannabe Honjin 神辺本陣; Kannabe honjin	Fukuyama			34°32′31″N 133°22′53″E		
Imakoyasan 今高野山; Imakoyasan	Sera			34°34′58″N 133°03′35″E		
Nosaka Kanzan Grave 野坂完山墓; Nosaka Kanzan no haka	Higashihiroshima			34°24′52″N 132°43′34″E		
Sekisen Library and School - Sōei Grave 石泉文庫及塾・僧叡之墓; Sekisen Bunko oyobi juku・Sōei no haka	Kure			34°12′52″N 132°37′26″E		
Bingo Ankoku-ji 備後安国寺; Bingo Ankokuji	Fukuyama			34°23′17″N 133°22′48″E		
Kanayama Castle Site 銀山城跡; Kanayama-jō ato	Hiroshima			34°27′22″N 132°26′55″E		
Kinomune-yama Dōtaku and Bronze Sword Excavation Site 木の宗山銅鐸銅剣出土地; Kinomune-yama dōtaku dōken shutsudo-chi	Hiroshima			34°27′37″N 132°32′36″E		
Iwawaki Kofun 岩脇古墳; Iwawaki kofun	Miyoshi			34°48′28″N 132°50′09″E		
Wakamiya Kofun 若宮古墳; Wakamiya kofun	Miyoshi			34°47′57″N 132°51′26″E		
Nikkōji Residence Site 日光寺住居跡; Nikkōji jūkyo ato	Miyoshi			34°47′49″N 132°51′41″E		
Innoshima Murakami Family Castle Sites 因島村上氏の城跡（長崎城跡，青木城跡，青陰城跡） Innoshima Murakami-shi no shiro ato	Onomichi	designation comprises the sites of Nagasaki Castle (長崎城跡), Aoki Castle (青木城跡), and Aokage Castle (青陰城跡)		34°16′52″N 133°10′50″E		
Rai Koresuga Former Residence 頼惟清旧宅; Rai Koresuga kyū-taku	Takehara			34°20′53″N 132°54′35″E		
Ushita Yayoi Culture Period Burial Mound 牛田の弥生文化時代墳墓; Ushita no Yayoi bunka jidai funbo	Hiroshima			34°24′49″N 132°28′35″E		
Old Yunoyama Hot Spring Resort 湯之山旧湯治場; Yunoyama kyū-tōji ato	Hiroshima			34°29′49″N 132°16′59″E		
Umatori Site 馬取遺跡; Umatori iseki	Fukuyama			34°26′09″N 133°16′39″E		
Shimo-Tsutsuga Storehouse 下筒賀の社倉; Shimo-Tsutsuga no shasō	Akiōta			34°36′18″N 132°18′24″E		
Taishakukyō Mawatari Site 帝釈峡馬渡遺跡; Taishakukyō Mawatari iseki	Shōbara			34°53′09″N 133°11′13″E		
Yamaga Ichirizuka 山家一里塚; Yamaga ichirizuka	Miyoshi			34°47′24″N 132°54′13″E		
Jizōgawara Ichirizuka 地蔵河原一里塚; Jizōgawara ichirizuka	Hiroshima			34°32′08″N 132°30′46″E		
Monument to Mayahara Shigeyo 馬屋原重帯の寿蔵碑; Mayahara Shigeyo no juzōhi	Fukuyama			34°32′48″N 133°19′08″E		
Kui Cow Market Site 杭の牛市跡; Kui no ushi-ichi ato	Mihara			34°32′11″N 133°02′08″E		
Kameijiri Kiln Site 亀井尻窯跡; Kameijiri kama ato	Shobara			34°50′57″N 132°59′17″E		
Hiraga Clan Sites 平賀氏の遺跡; Hiraga-shi no iseki	Higashihiroshima	designation includes the sites of Misonou Castle (御薗宇城跡) (pictured), Shiroyama Castle (白山城跡), Kashirazaki Castle (頭崎城跡), and the Hiraga Clan Cemetery (平賀氏の墓地)		34°28′15″N 132°48′02″E		
Goryū Castle Site 五龍城跡; Goryū-jō ato	Akitakata			34°27′22″N 132°26′55″E		
Rokunohara Iron Production Site 六の原製鉄場跡; Rokunohara seitetsu-jō ato	Shobara			34°55′54″N 133°06′55″E		
Kōyama Castle Site 甲山城跡; Kōyama-jō ato	Shobara			34°51′13″N 132°57′21″E		
Kimura Castle Site 木村城跡; Kimura-jō ato	Takehara			34°22′55″N 132°53′34″E		
Ōhama Storehouse 大浜の社倉; Ōhama no shasō	Kure			34°10′02″N 132°48′31″E		
Hajiōsako Kofun 土師大迫古墳; Hajiōsako kofun	Akitakata			34°39′33″N 132°36′18″E		
Tatamidani Yayoi Sites 畳谷弥生遺跡群; Tatamidani Yayoi iseki-gun	Hiroshima			34°25′19″N 132°31′05″E		
Egeyama-Yamate Yayoi Sites 恵下山・山手遺跡群; Egeyama・Yamate iseki-gun	Hiroshima			34°28′53″N 132°30′42″E		
Saiganjiyama Tumuli 西願寺山墳墓群; Saiganjiyama funbo-gun	Hiroshima			34°28′08″N 132°29′50″E		
Washioyama Castle Site 鷲尾山城跡; Washioyama-jō ato	Onomichi			34°29′07″N 133°11′09″E		
Mitama Ōzuka Kofun 三玉大塚古墳; Mitama Ōzuka kofun	Miyoshi			34°43′26″N 132°59′37″E		
Kusabuka Sluice Gate 草深の唐樋門; Kusabuka no karahimon	Fukuyama			34°23′02″N 133°19′51″E		
Sonedashirazuka Kofun 曽根田白塚古墳; Sonedashirazuka kofun	Fukuyama			34°32′17″N 133°16′06″E		
Inuzuka No.1 Kofun 犬塚第一号古墳; Inuzuka daiichi-gō kofun	Shobara			34°49′50″N 133°15′07″E		
Yanbe Ōzuka Kofun 山部大塚古墳; Yanbe Ōzuka kofun	Akitakata			34°41′23″N 132°42′34″E		
Shimo-Hondani Site (Miyoshi Gunga Site) 下本谷遺跡（三次郡衙跡） Shimohondani iseki (Miyoshi gunga ato)	Miyoshi			34°47′24″N 132°51′47″E		
Yokoro Site 横路遺跡; Yokoro iseki	Kitahiroshima			34°45′48″N 132°30′02″E		
Sakayatakatsuka Kofun 酒屋高塚古墳; Sakayatakatsuka kofun	Miyoshi			34°41′23″N 132°42′34″E		
Daibō Kofun 大坊古墳; Daibō kofun	Fukuyama			34°34′31″N 133°22′04″E		
Hattoritsukadani Cave Tombs 八鳥塚谷横穴群; Hattoritsukadani yokoana-gun	Shobara			34°57′56″N 133°08′01″E		
Utsubori Iron Mine Washing Area 内堀の神代垣内落鉄穴跡（洗場） Utsubori no Kajiro gōchiochi kanna ato (arai-ba)	Shobara			35°00′27″N 133°14′50″E		
Furudera Kofun Cluster 旧寺古墳群; Furudera kofun-gun	Shobara			34°52′05″N 133°00′06″E		
Takasugi Castle Site 高杉城跡; Takasugi-jō ato	Miyoshi			34°46′36″N 132°53′58″E		
Kurotani Kofun 黒谷古墳; Kurotani kofun	Mihara			34°32′22″N 132°53′33″E		
Taishakunagoeiwakage Site 帝釈名越岩陰遺跡; Taishakunagoeiwakage iseki	Shobara			34°51′30″N 133°11′55″E		
Toyomatsudōmen Cave Site 豊松堂面洞窟遺跡; Toyomatsudōmen dōkutsu iseki	Jinsekikōgen			34°46′12″N 133°19′27″E		
Shinden No.2 Kofun 神田第二号古墳; Shinden daini-gō kofun	Sera			34°35′25″N 133°01′08″E		
Sakoyama No.1 Kofun 迫山第一号古墳; Sakoyama daiichi-gō kofun	Fukuyama			34°33′53″N 133°23′27″E		
Gohongadake Castle Site 五品嶽城跡; Gohongadake-jō ato	Shobara			34°53′45″N 133°16′02″E		
Kanakurodani Iron Production Site カナクロ谷製鉄遺跡; Kanakurodani seitetsu iseki	Sera					
Kitazuka Kofun 北塚古墳; Kitazuka kofun	Fukuyama			34°34′22″N 133°18′55″E		
Marukoyama Castle Site 丸子山城跡; Marukoyama-jō ato	Kure			34°06′30″N 132°30′26″E		
Minamiyama Kofun 南山古墳; Minamiyama kofun	Fuchū			34°39′59″N 133°09′43″E		
Ōsakoyama Kofun Cluster 大迫山古墳群; Ōsakoyama kofun-gun	Shobara			34°53′36″N 133°16′46″E		
Imada Clan Fortified Residence Site 今田氏城館跡; Imada-shi jōkan ato	Kitahiroshima			34°40′01″N 132°30′09″E		
Toshima Ōtsuka Kofun 戸島大塚古墳; Toshima Ōtsuka kofun	Akitakata			34°38′32″N 132°44′18″E		
Hitotobara Iron Sand Smelting Site (Ōtaniyama Tatara) 小鳥原砂鉄製錬場跡（大谷山たたら） Hitotobara satetsu seiren-jō ato (Ōtaniyama tatara)	Shobara			35°02′16″N 133°09′22″E		
Sainokami Tumuli 歳ノ神墳墓群; Sainokami funbo-gun	Kitahiroshima			34°40′08″N 132°32′43″E		
Nakaideshōbu Pass Tumuli 中出勝負峠墳墓群; Nakaideshōbu-tōge funbo-gun	Kitahiroshima			34°40′13″N 132°32′39″E		
Shitomiyama Castle Site 蔀山城跡; Shitomiyama-jō ato	Shobara			35°02′07″N 132°56′00″E		
Ishizuchiyama Kofun Cluster 石鎚山古墳群; Ishizuchiyama kofun-gun	Fukuyama			34°34′04″N 133°20′57″E		
Karabitsu Kofun 唐櫃古墳; Karabitsu kofun	Shobara			34°48′13″N 133°10′49″E		
Mibunishitani Site 壬生西谷遺跡; Mibunishitani iseki	Kitahiroshima			34°41′08″N 132°32′45″E		
Itoi Ōtsuka Kofun 糸井大塚古墳（糸井塚の本第一号古墳） Itoi Ōtsuka kofun (Itoitsuka no hon daiichi-gō kofun)	Miyoshi			34°44′55″N 132°53′57″E		
Sagata Castle Site 相方城跡; Sagata-jō ato	Fukuyama			34°32′52″N 133°15′53″E		
Toyohira-chō Mediaeval Iron Production Sites 豊平町中世製鉄遺跡群; Toyohira-chō chūsei seitetsu iseki-gun	Kitahiroshima	designation includes the Makigahara Iron Production Site (槇ケ原製鉄遺跡), Yaguri Iron Production Site (矢栗製鉄遺跡), and Konzoku Iron Production Site (坤束製鉄遺跡)		34°37′45″N 132°27′20″E		
Matsuo Castle Site 松尾城跡; Matsuo-jō ato	Akitakata					
Tatsunokuchi Kofun 辰の口古墳; Tatsunokuchi kofun	Jinsekikōgen			34°48′13″N 133°10′49″E		

== Municipal Historic Sites ==
As of 1 May 2024, a further three hundred and fifty-six Sites have been designated as being of municipal importance.

== See also ==
- Cultural Properties of Japan
- Bingo and Aki Provinces
- Hiroshima Prefectural Museum of History
- List of Places of Scenic Beauty of Japan (Hiroshima)
- List of Cultural Properties of Japan - paintings (Hiroshima)
