= Mitsujō Kofun =

- 三ツ城古墳 (Japanese)
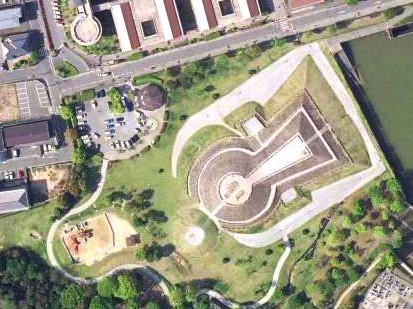

- Mitsujō Kofun Cluster Mitsujō Kofun (Japan)
- 34°24′59.10″N 132°44′2.67″E
- Type: kofun cluster
- Periods: Kofun period
- Location: Higashihiroshima, Hiroshima, Japan
- Region: San'yō region

History
- Built: 4th century AD

Site notes
- Elevation: 10 m (33 ft)
- Public access: Yes
- National Historic Site of Japan

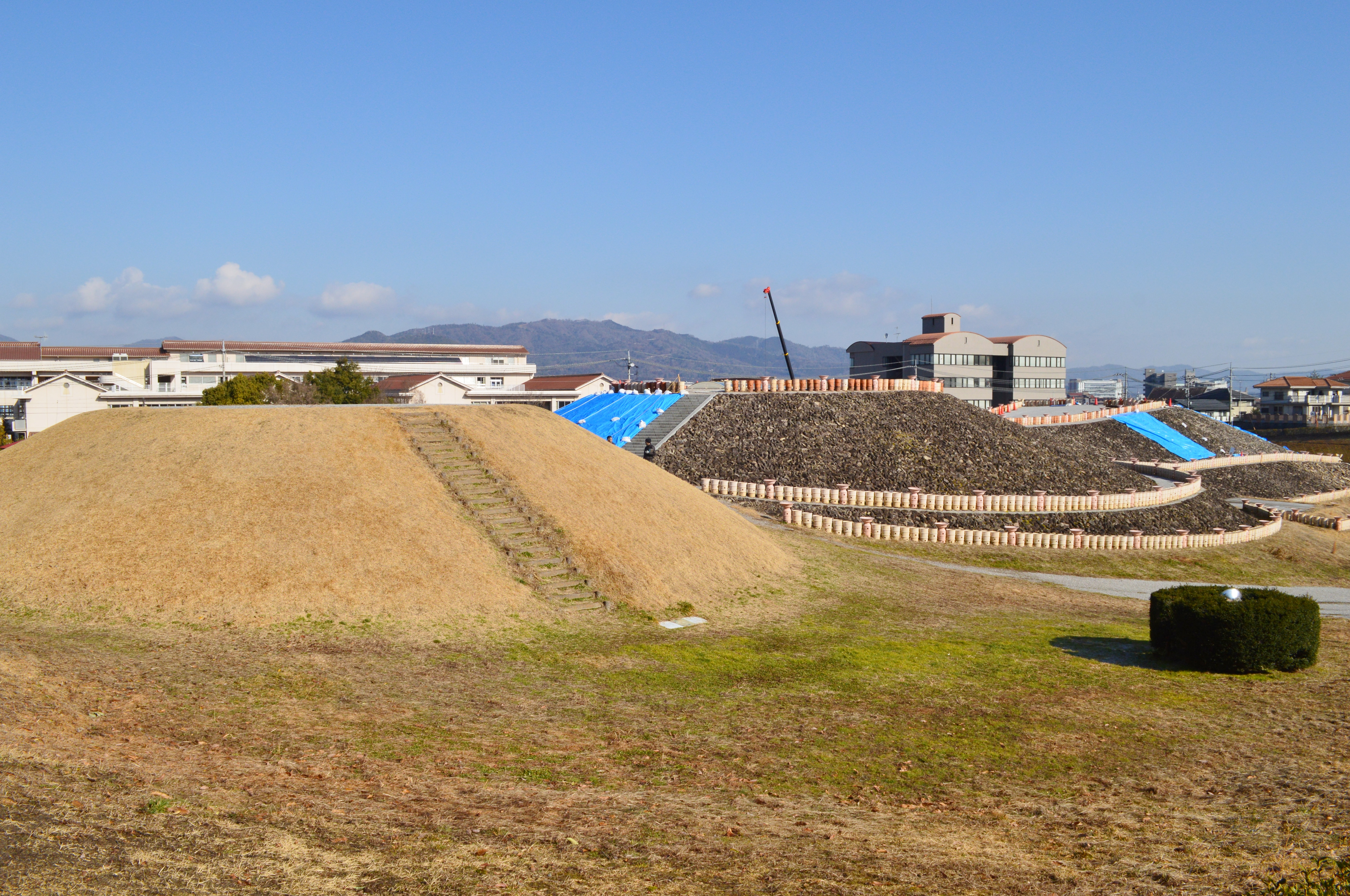
No.2 on left, Mitsujō Kofun on right

The Mitsujō Kofun (三ツ城古墳, Mitsujō kofun) is a group of three Kofun period burial mounds located in the Nakajō-chūō neighborhood of the city of Higashihiroshima, Hiroshima Prefecture in the San'yō region of Japan. The cluster was collectively designated a National Historic Site in 1982 with the area under protection expanded in 2001. Archaeological excavations have been conducted in 1954 and from 1987 to 1991.

== Overview ==
The Mitsujō Kofun is a zenpō-kōen-fun (前方後円墳), which is shaped like a keyhole, having one square end and one circular end, when viewed from above, and is the largest keyhole-shaped burial mound in Hiroshima Prefecture. It is located at the edge of a hill on the southern edge of the Saijō Basin. With a total length of about 92 meters, it was constructed in three tiers, with an anterior width of about 67 meters and a posterior circular portion with a diameter of about 62 meters and a height of about 13 meters. It is orientated to the east-northeast. On the outer surface, in addition to fukiishi, a row of cylindrical haniwa (including "morning glory-shaped" haniwa) and figurative haniwa (house-shaped, lid-shaped, chicken-shaped, waterfowl-shaped, shield-shaped, dove-shaped, helmet-shaped, short armor-shaped, etc.) have been found. There were about 1,800 haniwa in the entire mound. A dry moat with a depth of about one meter surrounded the tumulus.

Three box-shaped burial chambers have been confirmed in the posterior tumulus, two of which contained stone sarcophagi. Metalware such as bronze mirrors, iron swords and knives, bronze scepters, and beads have been unearthed, as well as Haji ware and Sue ware pottery.

Based on the construction techniques and recovered artifacts, it was believed that the Mitsujō Kofun was built in the middle of the Kofun period (5th century), and was the burial location of the chiefs of the southern part of Kingdom of Aki. In 2009, it was announced that the construction date of the Mitsujō Kofun had been determined to have been 412 AD, based on research into the excavated Sue ware. It is the first time that the date of a kofun had been determined with such precision.

To the south of the Mitsujō Kofun is a round empun (円墳)-style tumulus (designated "Mitsujō Kofun No. 2") with a diameter of about 25 meters and height of four meters. It predates the Mitsujō Kofun. A third tumulus, designed "Mitsujō Kofun No.3" is a four by eight meter oval mound, and intersects with the moat of Kofun No.2. It was constructed in the late Kofun period and thus postdates both the Mitsujō Kofun and Mitsujō Kofun No. 2.

The site has been restored and is maintained as a historical park. The site is about 15 minutes by car from Higashi-Hiroshima Station on the Sanyo Shinkansen.

== See also ==
- List of Historic Sites of Japan (Hiroshima)
