= Jinyama Tumulus Cluster =

- 陣山墳墓群 (Japanese)
- Jinyama Tumulus Cluster Jinyama Tumulus Cluster (Japan)
- Interactive map of Jinyama Tumulus Cluster
- 34°47′20″N 132°54′29″E
- Type: burial mound
- Periods: Yayoi period
- Location: Miyoshi, Hiroshima, Japan
- Region: San'yō region

History
- Built: 1st century AD

Site notes
- Public access: Yes (no facilities)

Jinyama Tumulus Cluster (陣山墳墓群) is a group of Yayoi period burial mounds, located in the Shijukan and Mukaeda neighborhoods of the city of Miyoshi, Hiroshima in the San'yō region of Japan. The tumulus group was collectively designated a National Historic Site of Japan in 2000.

== Overview ==
Jinyama Tumulus Cluster consists of five burial mounds built from the top to the east side of a hill. The style of construction is known as yosumi-tosshutsugata (四隅突出形), which is square or rectangular, with protrusions on each of its four corners. The slopes of the burial mounds are lined with stones. This style is unique to the late middle Yayoi period (1st century AD), and is most prevalent in western Japan in areas influenced by the Izumo culture. Each of the five tumuli are approximately 40 meters long from north-to-south and about 8 meters wide from east-to-west. Tumuli No. 2 to No. 5 are arranged regularly within the same area, but Tumulus No. 1 was built under the embankment of Tumulus No. 2 and has a different main orientation from the other tumuli. Based on the Shiomachi-style Yayoi pottery, which is an indicator of the late middle Yayoi period (1st century), unearthed from each of the tombs, it is believed that these tombs were built for a limited period of time.

The site is about 11 minutes by car from Miyoshi Station on the JR West Geibi Line.

== See also ==
- List of Historic Sites of Japan (Hiroshima)
