= Hanazono Site =

- 花園遺跡 (Japanese)
- Hanazono Site Hanazono Site (Japan)
- Interactive map of Hanazono Site
- 34°47′51″N 132°51′34″E
- Type: burial mound cluster
- Periods: Yayoi period
- Location: Miyoshi, Hiroshima, Japan
- Region: San'yō region

Site notes
- Public access: Yes (no facilities)

Hanazono Site (花園遺跡) is a Yayoi period Necropolis, located in the Tokaichi neighborhood of the city of Miyoshi, Hiroshima Prefecture, in the San'yō region of Japan. The tumulus cluster was designated a National Historic Site of Japan in 1978.

== Overview ==
The Hanazono Site is located in low hilly terrain develops on the southern edge of the Miyoshi Basin, and one branch of the hill extends north toward JR Miyoshi Station. Surveys revealed a large number of trapezoidal burial mounds and square grooved tombs built in the middle to late Yayoi period at an elevation of 190 meters on the northern slope of the hill.

Burial Mound No. 1 is located at the highest point of Hanazono Hills, and measures 32 meters east–west and 18 meters north–south. The north side is a sloping surface, and stones are piled up to a height of about 1.3 meters to prepare the front view of the platform-shaped cemetery. The east and west sides are similarly lined with stones, but the method is somewhat sparse, and the south side has a ditch one to two meters wide and 0.2 meters deep. The platform contained a large number of pits, some stone-lined, with two or three pits arranged in pairs in the center of the grave area. Burials included 40 directly into the soil of the mound, 23 in stone-lined burial chambers directly into the soil, 23 in stone sarcophagi for a total 86. The direct burials tended to be in the southern portion of the mound, and the stone-lined or stone sarcophagi in the north. Many of the stone sarcophagi were very small, although it is not known of these were for children, or were ossuaries used after reburial.

Burial Mound No. 2 is adjacent to the northwest of Mound No. 1 with a slight axis shift and has a rectangular shape measuring 15 meters east–west and 9 meters north–south. As with Mound No.1, a front was created on the north side with stones are placed on the slope, and stones were arranged on the other sides to create a clearly trapezoidal tomb area. The mound contained five direct burials, one stone-lined burial and one stone sarcophagus for a total of six. Mound No. 3 is adjacent to Mound No. 1 to the north and Mound No. 2 to the east, but its size is unknown as it does not have a ditch to clearly define the area. It contained two direct burials, nine stone-lined burials and four stone sarcophagi.

Aside from the above three burial mounds, there are three smaller square burial mounds to the north, which appear to have many burials, but which have not been fully excavated.

The site is about seven minutes by car from JR West Geibi Line Miyoshi Station.

== See also ==
- List of Historic Sites of Japan (Hiroshima)
