= Kōtachi Kofun =

Kofun period burial mound in Japan

- 甲立古墳 (Japanese)
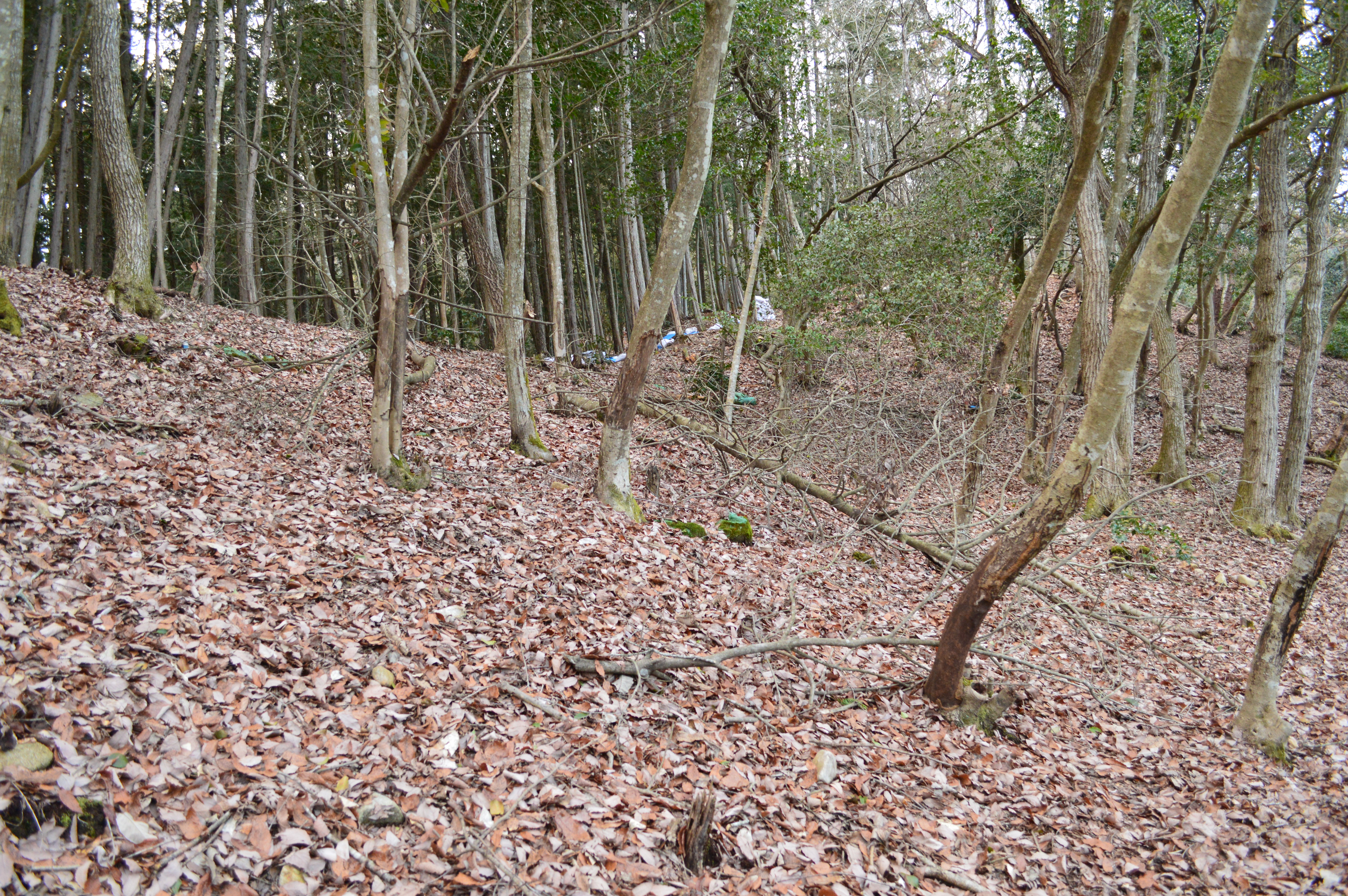
- Kōtachi Kofun (left is anterior, right is posterior)

- Kōtachi Kofun Kōtachi Kofun (Japan)
- Interactive map of Kōtachi Kofun
- 34°42′18.07″N 132°45′16.90″E
- Type: Kofun
- Periods: Kofun period
- Location: Akitakata, Hiroshima, Japan
- Region: San'yō region

History
- Built: c.4th century

Site notes
- Public access: Yes (no facilities)

The Kōtachi Kofun (甲立古墳) is a Kofun period burial mound, located in the Kōda neighborhood of the city of Akitakata, Hiroshima in the San'yō region of Japan. The tumulus, which is the second largest in Hiroshima Prefecture, was designated a National Historic Site of Japan in 2016. It is estimated to have been built around the latter half of the 4th century (the end of the first half of the Kofun period).

== Overview ==
The Kōtachi Kofun is located on a ridge to the northeast of the urban center of the former town of Kōda. It was recognized as a kofun in 2008, and archaeological excavations have been conducted from 2010 to 2013, and 2018–2019. The tumulus is a zenpō-kōen-fun (前方後円墳), which is shaped like a keyhole, having one square end and one circular end, when viewed from above, and is orientated to the south. The tumulus was constructed in three tiers in the posterior circular portion and two tiers in the anterior rectangular portion, and has a total length of 77.5 meters. The entire outer surface is covered with fukiishi and rows of both cylindrical ("morning glory-shaped" and elliptical tubular) and figurative (boat-shaped, house-shaped and armor-shaped) haniwa have been found. There is no trace of a moat. Details of the burial chamber remain uncertain, but per electrical resistivity tomography investigation, there is a pit-type stone-lined chamber in the center of the posterior circular portion. As this has yet to be excavated by digging, no grave goods have been discovered.

The tumulus is estimated to have been constructed around the latter half of the 4th century based on its design and haniwa, which are both very characteristic of the Kinai region of Japan and indicate a strong connection to the Yamato kingdom. During later investigation, a second tumulus was discovered in the near vicinity. This was a square hōfun (方墳)-style tumulus which dates from the end of the 3rd century to the beginning of the 4th century.

The tumulus is located approximately 25 minutes on foot from Kōtachi Station on the JR West Geibi Line. Excavated artifacts are displayed at the Akitakata Museum of History and Folklore (安芸高田市歴史民俗博物館) .

Total length
77.5 meters:
Anterior rectangular portion
30.5 meters wide x 6.5 meters high, 2-tier
Posterior circular portion
56.2 meter diameter x 8 meters high, 3-tiers

== See also ==
- List of Historic Sites of Japan (Hiroshima)
