= Yosekuraiwakage Site =

Archeological site in Japan's San'yō region

- 寄倉岩陰遺跡 (Japanese)
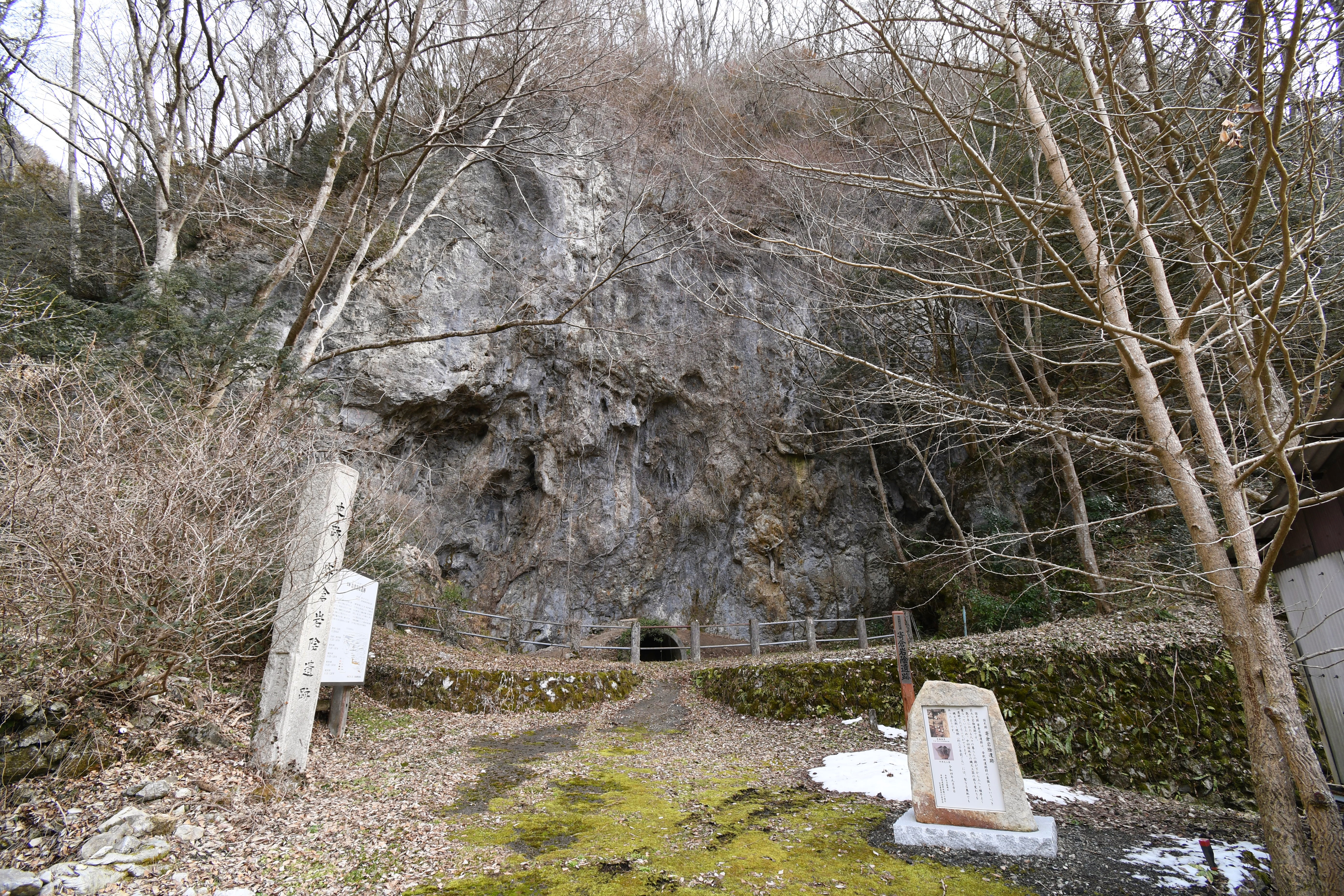
- Yosekuraiwakage Site

- Yosekuraiwakage Yosekuraiwakage Site (Japan)
- Interactive map of Yosekuraiwakage Site
- 34°52′12″N 133°12′18″E
- Type: settlement
- Periods: Jōmon period
- Location: Shōbara, Hiroshima, Japan
- Region: San'yō region

Site notes
- Excavation dates: 1965-1987
- Discovered: 1965
- Public access: None

The Yosekuraiwakage ruins (寄倉岩陰遺跡, Yosekuraiwakage iseki) is an archaeological site consisting of a rock shelter dwelling in use during the Jōmon period, located in the Tōjō neighborhood of the city of Shōbara, Hiroshima in the San'yō region of Japan. The site was designated a National Historic Site of Japan in 1969.

== Overview ==
The Yosekuraiwakage site is located at the foot of a limestone mountain on the north (left) bank of the Taishaku River in the Taishakukyo Gorge. A survey in 1961 revealed that many prehistoric rock shelters and cave ruins were distributed in this area, the largest of which is the Yosekuraiwakage site, stretching over 30 meters in length and over 15 meters in width. Artifacts from the Jōmon period to the Kamakura period (1192-1332) have been unearthed, but the cultural layers of the Jōmon period (approximately 10,000 BC to around 300 BC) are especially thick. Numerous artifacts, including Jōmon pottery were excavated in a well-ordered stratigraphy, making this an important archaeological site that serves as a reference for the chronology of Jōmon pottery in the Chugoku and Shikoku regions. Thirteen natural sedimentary layers have been confirmed, and it is known that people lived there from the end of the early Jōmon period to almost the end of the Jōmon period. In addition, piles of human bones from the late Jōmon period were discovered in two places on the south side of the rock wall. A total of 46 human bones have been confirmed, but since the northern area extends into an unsurveyed area (preservation area), it is believed that more than 50 human bones were buried here. The positioning of the bones indicates that they were deliberately collected, suggesting reburial or a secondary burial. In terms of scale, this site may have been a communal burial ground for surrounding settlements. In addition, the pommel of a stone sword was excavated along with the human bones.

Currently, a preservation facility has been established for the ruins, and part of the sedimentary layer can be observed. The site is about 20 minutes by car from the Chugoku Expressway Tojo IC.

== See also ==
- List of Historic Sites of Japan (Hiroshima)
