= Renjuku =

Historical Academy in Japan

- 廉塾
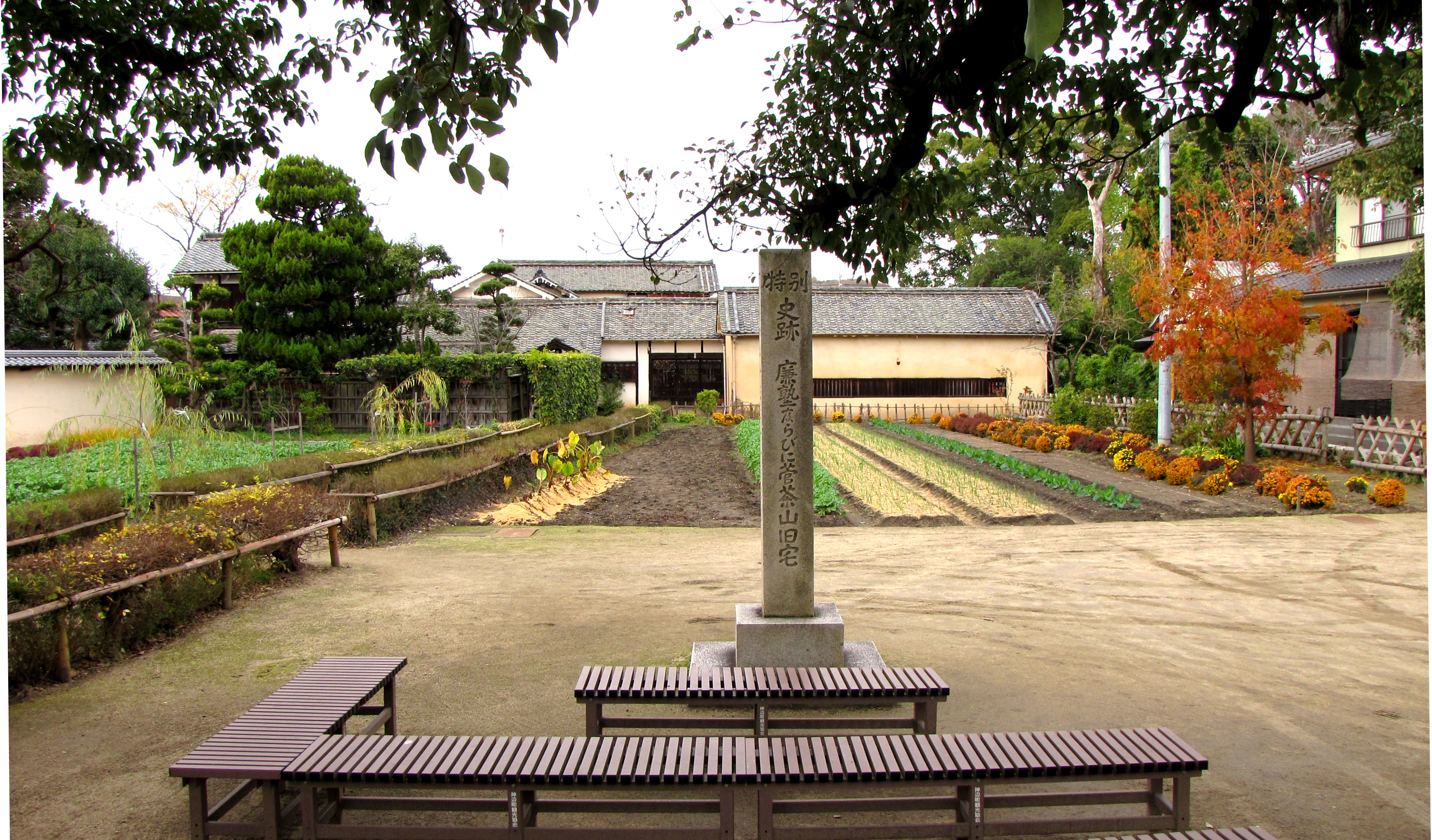
- Renjuku precincts

- Location within Hiroshima Prefecture Location within Japan

General information
- Location: 640 Kannabe-cho, Fukuyama-shi, Hiroshima-ken 720-2123, Japan
- Coordinates: 34°32′40.7″N 133°23′04″E
- Inaugurated: 1748

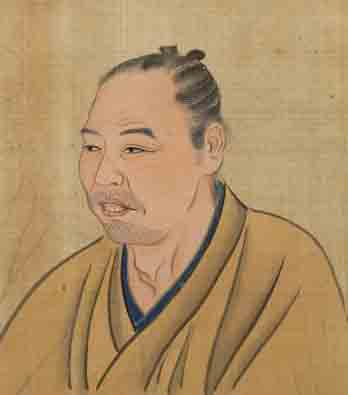
Suga Chazan

The Renjuku (廉塾) was a private academy in Edo period Japan. Located in the Kannabe neighborhood of the city of Fukuyama, Hiroshima Prefecture, it was designated a Special National Historic Site in 1934.

== Overview ==
The Renjuku was a private academy and residence of the Neo-Confucian scholar Suga Chazan. Suga was born in Kannabe (now Kannabe-chō, Fukuyama city) in 1748. When he was 19 years old, he traveled to Kyoto to study Neo-Confucianism, then returned to his hometown and opened a private school in a different location in 1775. Around 1785, it was named “Kinzokuen” (金粟園). In 1791 or 1792, due to an increase in the number of students, the school moved to its current location and became “Koyosekiyosonsha” (黄葉夕陽村舎). It 1796 it received official recognition from Fukuyama Domain and came to be called “Renjuku”, although its official name was the “Kannabe Gakumonsho” (神辺学問所).

In principle, it was a boarding school, and was supported by the income from rice farming in the paddy fields owned by the school. Renjuku accepted students without discrimination to social class, and as a result students included samurai, doctors, priests, townspeople, and farmers, and their hometowns ranged widely from Fukuyama Domain to western Japan and as far as Dewa Province in northwestern Japan. In principle, the school was free, but the students had to pay for food and some books. Even this amount was more money per month than the annual wages of a typical servant, so, it is believed that the students who could afford it were from relatively wealthy families; however, those who could not afford to pay were able to learn by helping with the housework. The number of students was typically between 20 and 30 students at any one time. Many finished their studies in two or three years and returned to their hometowns, taking over their family business, or establishing themselves as Confucian scholars. The school was closed in 1872 with the abolition of feudal domains and enactment of the modern educational system.

The academy is situated on the north side of the irrigation canal on the premises, and the three rooms to the right of the entrance were the lecture halls. The western corner contains a Kura (storehouse) and a bathroom. Across the irrigation canal was a one-story dormitory with a tiled roof. Suga's former residence is a two-story, tile-roofed building located south of the school. Although some parts were repaired and expanded after the Meiji Restoration, the storehouse, barn, etc., are well preserved. In 1934, the area around the school and the former residence was designated as a National Historic Site, and in 1953, it was designated as a Special National Historic Site. It is located about 15 minutes on foot from Kannabe Station on the JR West Fukuen Line. The site and buildings remain under private ownership by a descendant of Suga Chazan.

The Suga Chazan Memorial Museum (菅茶山記念館, Suga CHazan Kinnenkan) is located about two kilometers to the north-northeast.

== See also ==
- List of Historic Sites of Japan (Hiroshima)
- History of education in Japan
