= Jōrakuji-Nanatsuzuka Kofun Cluster =

- 浄楽寺・七ツ塚古墳群 (Japanese)
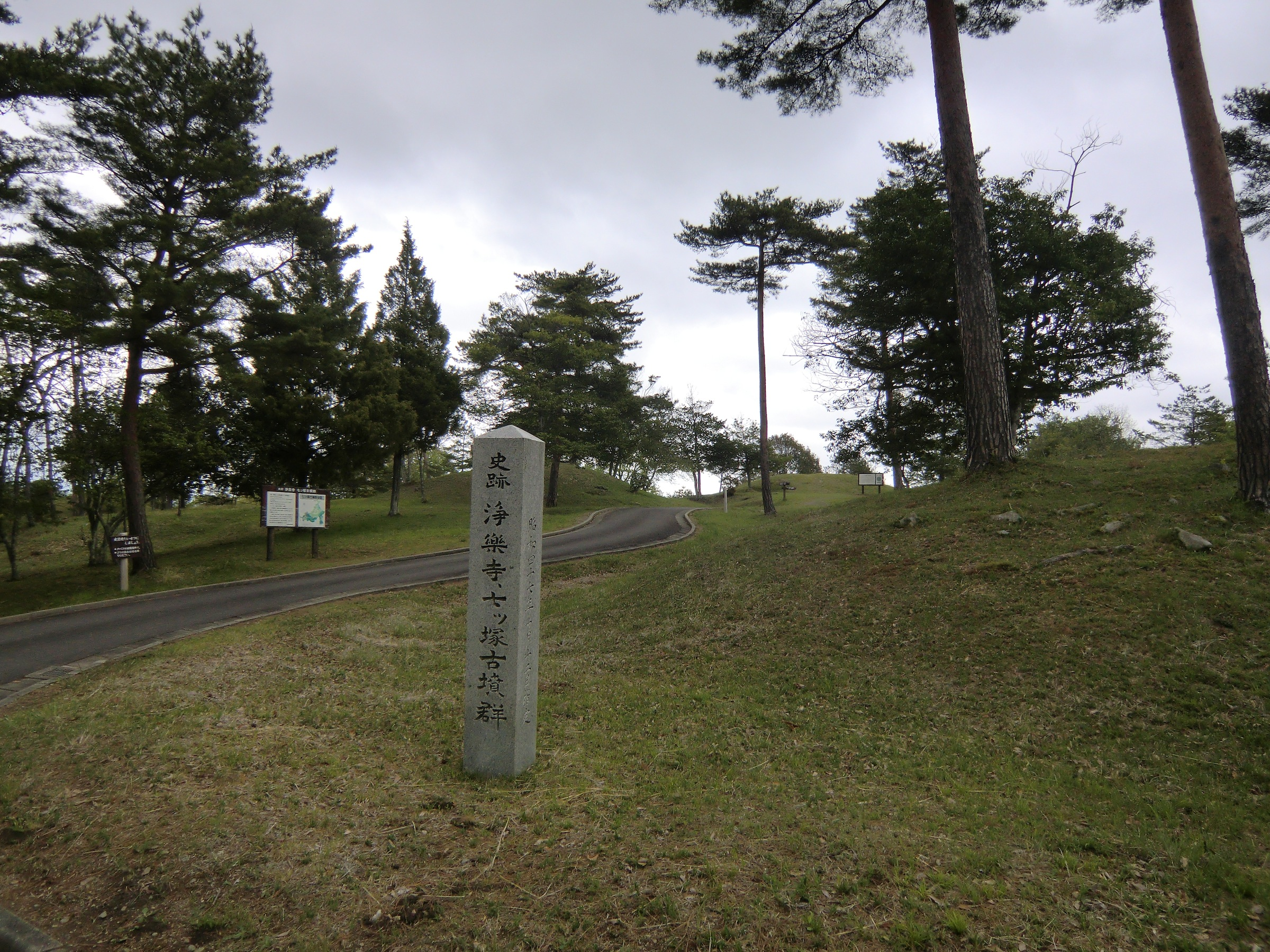

- Jōrakuji-Nanatsuzuka Kofun Cluster Jōrakuji-Nanatsuzuka Kofun Cluster (Japan)
- 34°33′13″N 133°18′44″E
- Type: kofun cluster
- Periods: Kofun period
- Location: Miyoshi, Hiroshima, Japan
- Region: San'yō region

History
- Built: 5th-6th century AD

Site notes
- Elevation: 10 m (33 ft)
- Public access: Yes
- National Historic Site of Japan

The Jōrakuji-Nanatsuzuka Kofun Cluster (浄楽寺・七ツ塚古墳群, Jōrakuji-Nanatsuzuka kofun-gun) is a group of Kofun period burial mounds located in the Takasugi and Odasaiwai neighborhoods of the city of Miyoshi, Hiroshima Prefecture in the San'yō region of Japan. The cluster was designated a National Historic Site in 1972.

== Overview ==
The Miyoshi Basin in the Chugoku Mountains of former Bingo Province has one of the most dense concentration of burial mounds in the Chugoku region. The Jōrakuji-Nanatsuzuka cluster is one of the largest of these, and is located on a hill on the west bank of the Mihara River in the southeastern part of the Miyoshi Basin. The burial mounds are divided into north and south groups. In the Jōrakuji cluster on the north side consists of a total of 116 kofun, including one scallop-shaped (hotategata-kofun (帆立貝形古墳)), 97 circular-type (empun (円墳)), and 18 square-type (hōfun (方墳)). Mound No.12. the largest in this cluster, is a circular burial mound measuring 6 meters in height and 55 meters in diameter.

In the Nanatsuzuka Burial Mounds, located approximately 116 meters south, consists of a total of 60 burial mounds, including one zenpō-kōen-fun (前方後円墳), which is shaped like a keyhole, having one square end and one circular end, when viewed from above. It has a total length of 29.5 meters. There are also 2 scallop-shaped kofun, 55 circular-type empun, and two square-type hōfun.

Based on the style of the burial chambers and excavated artifacts, it is believed that these burial mounds were constructed in the middle to late Kofun period (5th to 6th centuries AD). The area around the burial mounds has been preserved and maintained as the Hiroshima Prefectural Miyoshi Fudoki no Oka Park (広島県立みよし風土記の丘), which houses the Prefectural Museum of History and Folklore. The site is a 15-minute walk from Kamisugi Station on the JR West Geibi Line.

== See also ==
- List of Historic Sites of Japan (Hiroshima)
