= Mitoshiro Kofun =

- 御年代古墳 (Japanese)
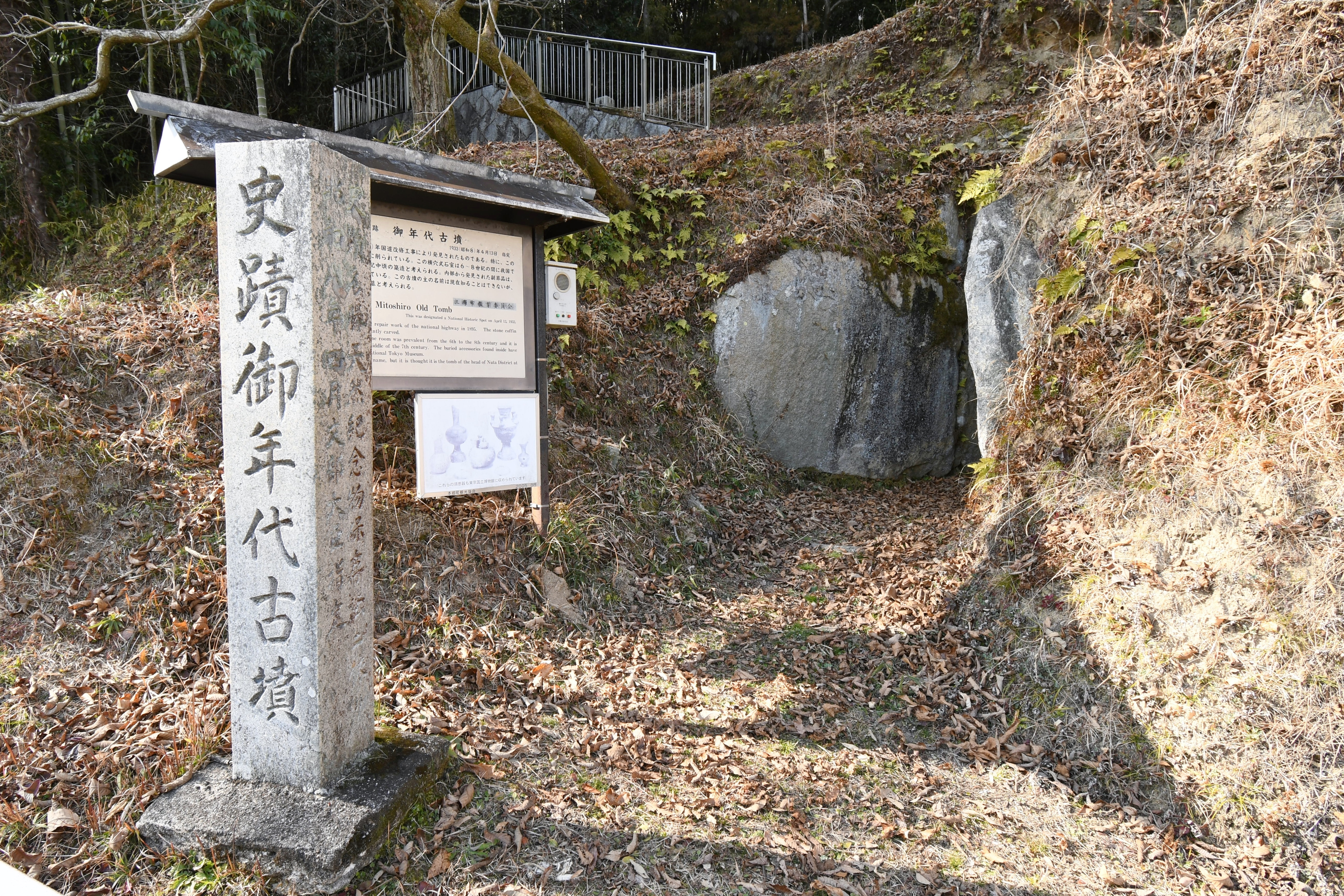
- Mitoshiro Kofun entrance

- Mitoshiro Kofun Mitoshiro Kofun (Japan)
- Interactive map of Mitoshiro Kofun
- 34°23′52.28″N 132°56′48.77″E
- Type: Kofun
- Periods: Kofun period
- Location: Mihara, Hiroshima, Japan
- Region: San'yō region

History
- Built: c.7th century

Site notes
- Public access: Yes (no facilities)

The Mitoshiro Kofun (御年代古墳) is a Kofun period burial mound, located in the Hongō neighborhood of the city of Mihara, Hiroshima in the San'yō region of Japan. The tumulus was designated a National Historic Site of Japan in 1933.

== Overview ==
The Mitoshiro Kofun is located on the southern slope of a hill in a deep valley where the Ohara River flows into the Nuta River. In this area are numerous important burial mounds from the latter half of the Kofun period. This tumulus was discovered in 1895 during construction work for a highway. The original form of the tumulus is uncertain, but it be believed to have been a circular enpun (円墳)-style kofun, orientated to the south. The tumulus contains a corridor-style burial chamber built with granite cut stone, with a total length of 10.7 meters. The burial chamber is unusual in that it has a pillar-shaped stone in the center and is divided into an anterior chamber and a posterior chamber. The front room is 3 meters long, 2.2 meters wide, and 2.2 meters high, and the rear room is 3.6 meters long, 1.9 meters wide, and 2.2 meters high. The corridor is 4.1meters long, 1.55 meters wide and 1.9 meters high. Grave goods included gold rings, gilt-bronze harnesses, and Sue ware pottery, and based on these relics and the shape of the two stone sarcophagi, it is believed to have been built in the middle of the 7th century, at the end of the Kofun period. The excavated items are now kept at the Tokyo National Museum.

== Gallery ==
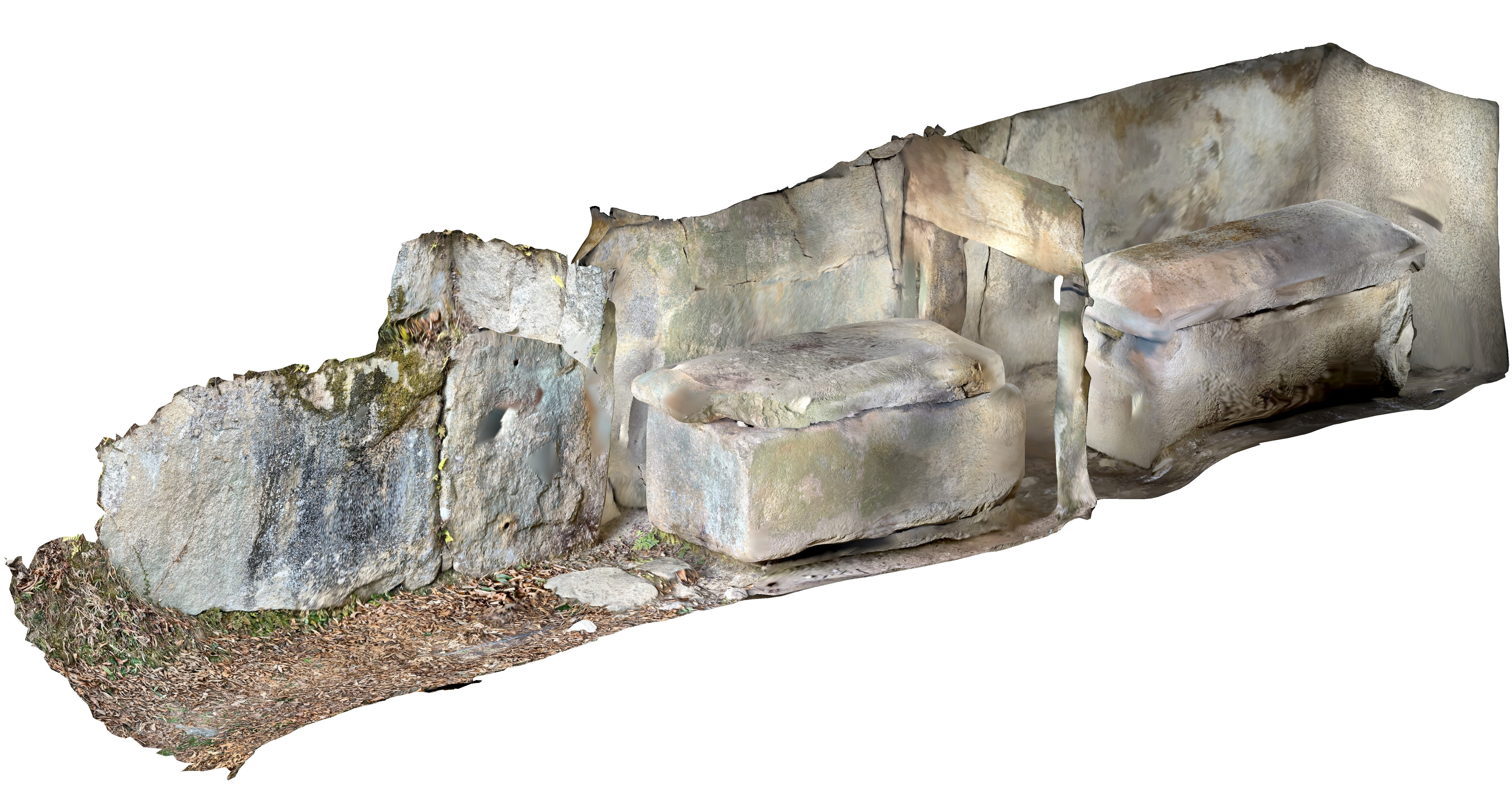
3D rendition of burial chamber

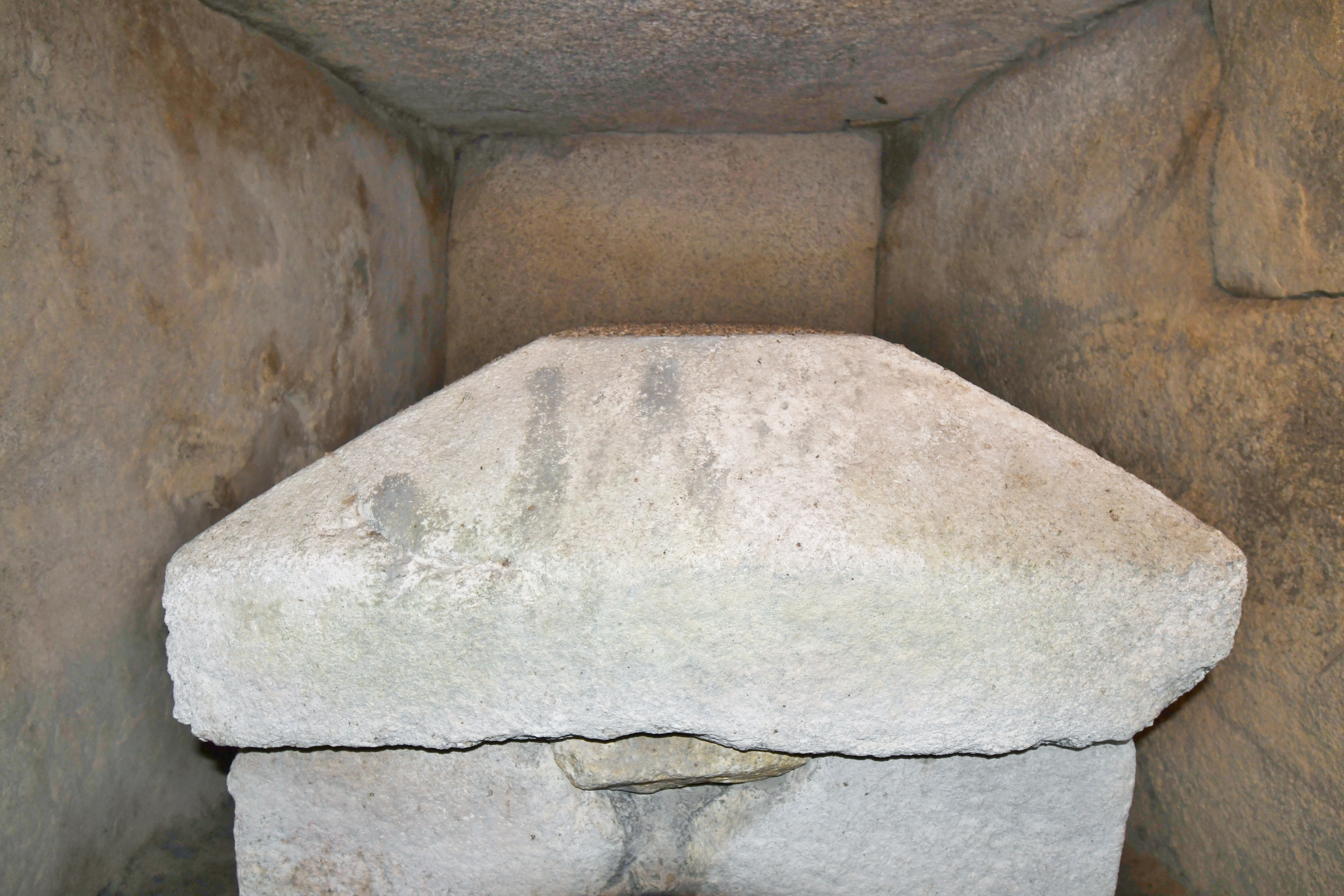
posterior chamber（looking towards back）

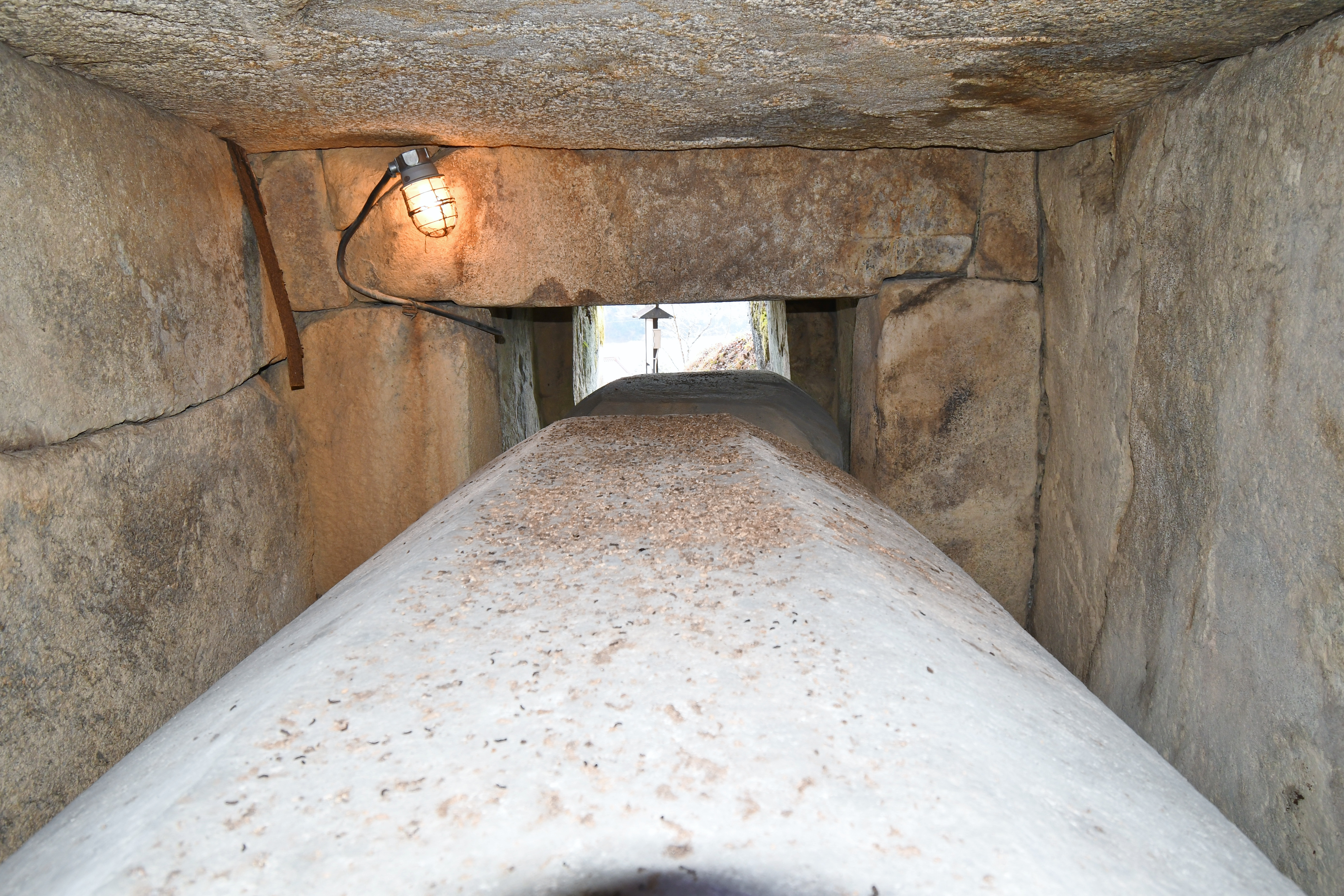
posterior chamber（looking towards entry）

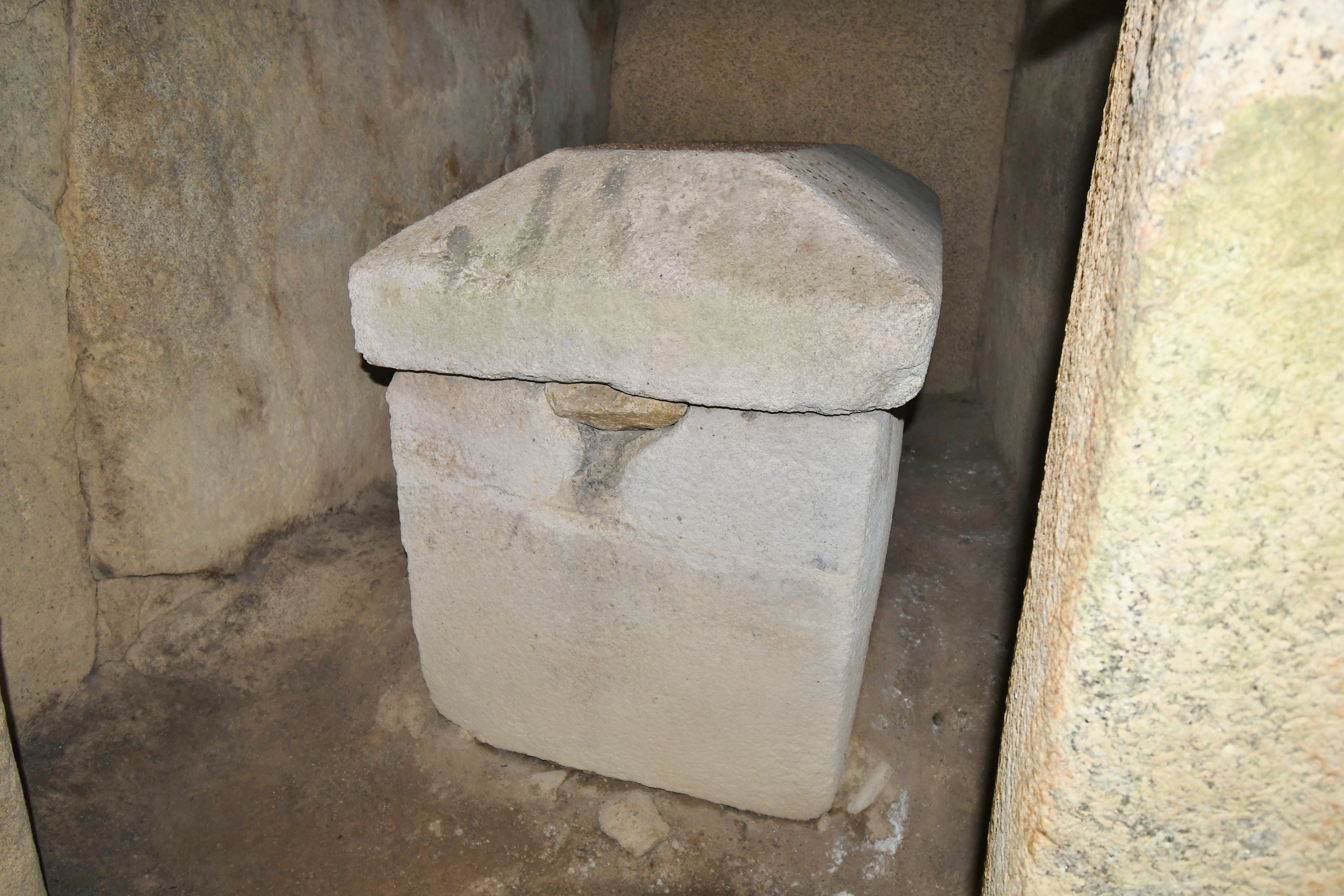
Sarcophagus in posterior chamber

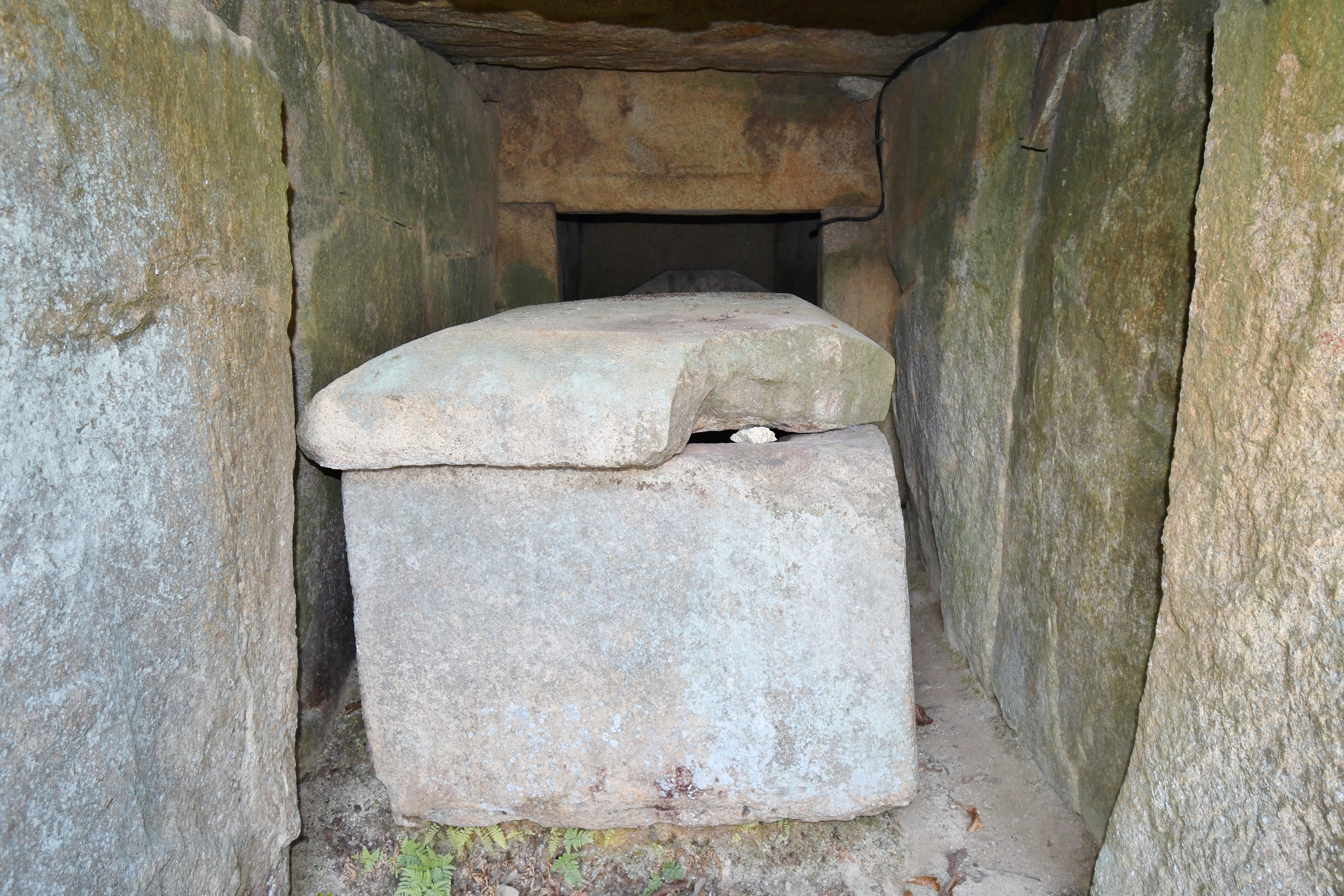
anterior chamber（looking towards back）

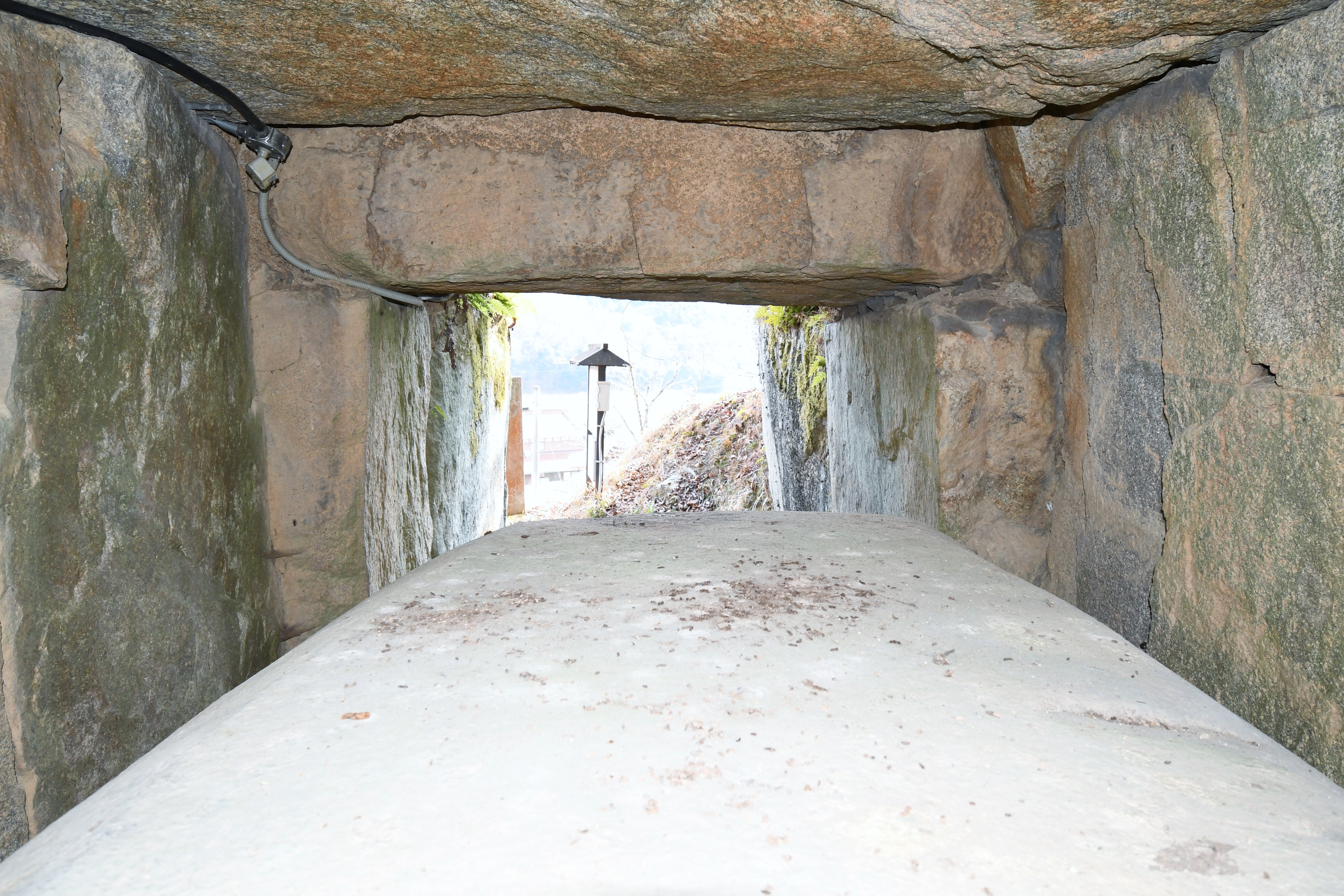
anterior chamber（looking towards entry）

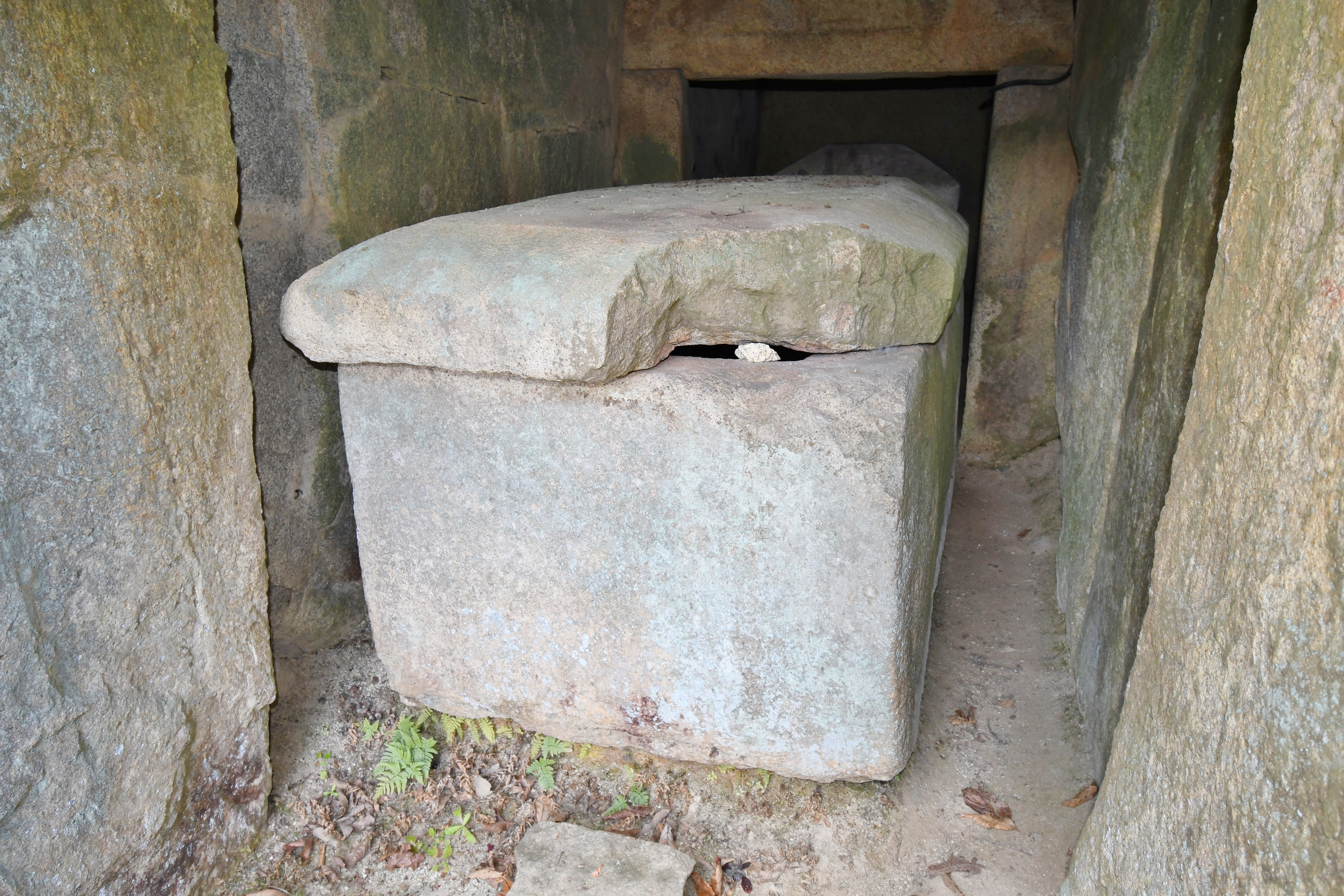
Sarcophagus in anterior chamber

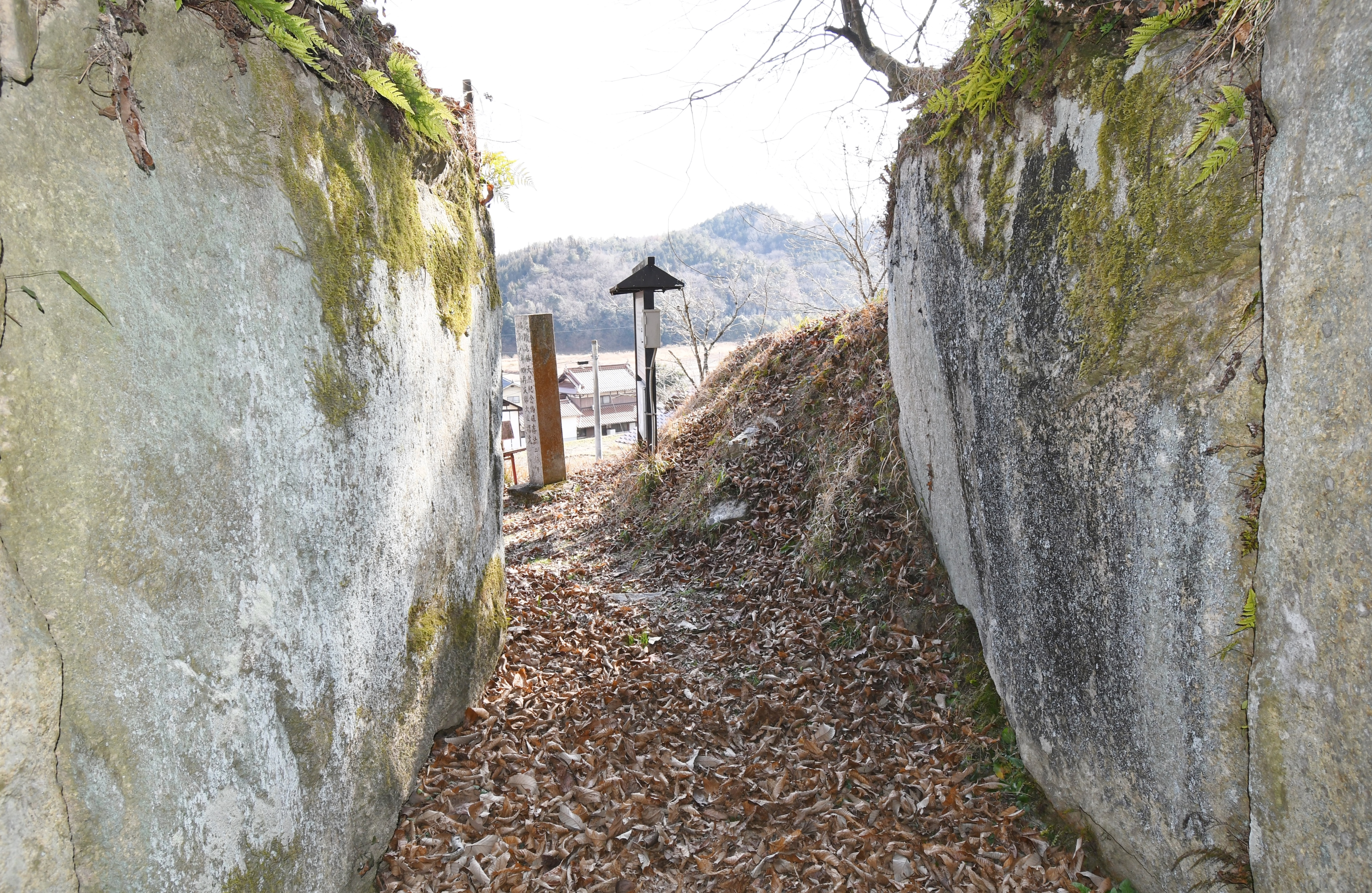
Corridor（looking towards entry）

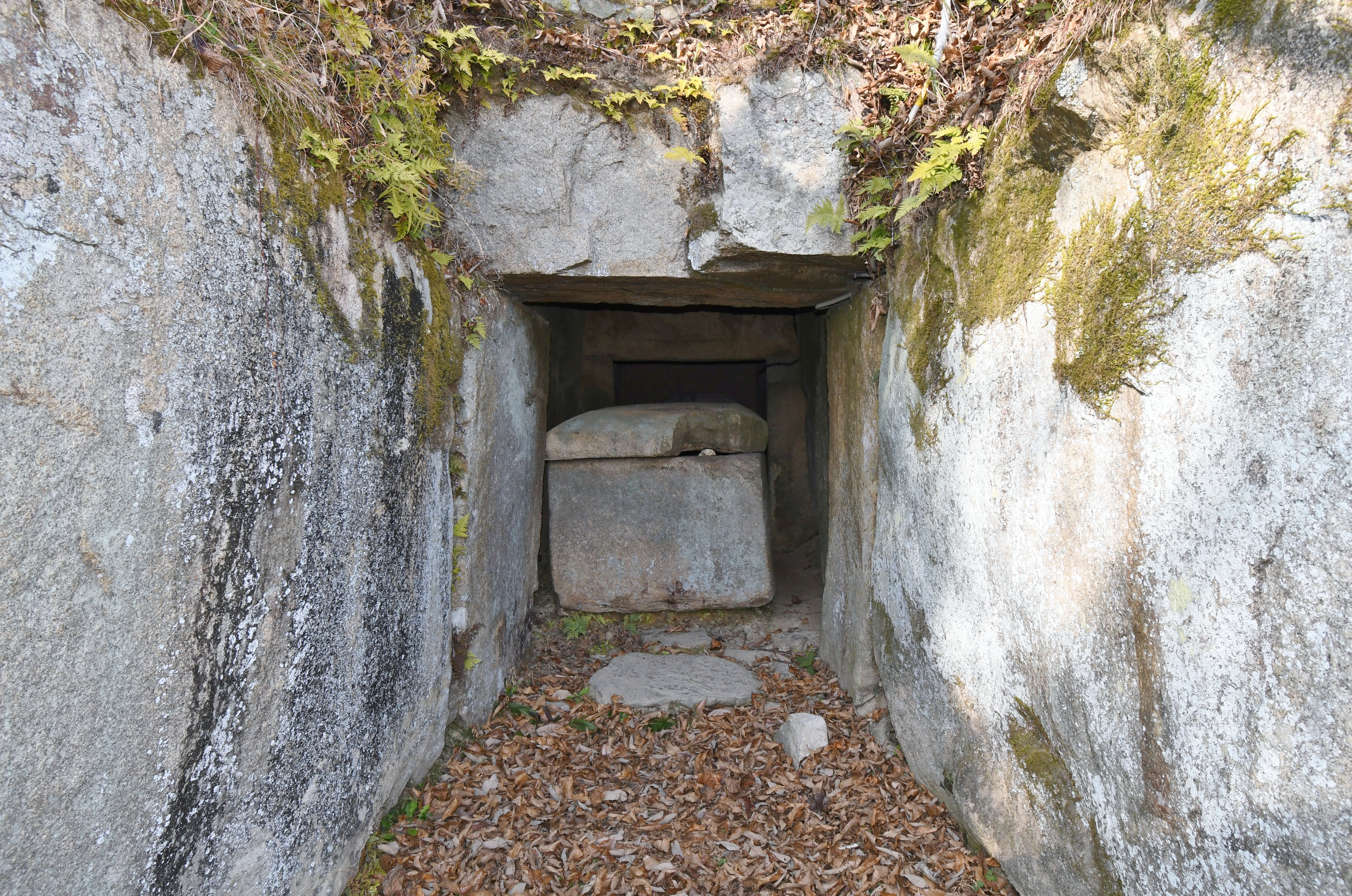
Corridor（looking towards anterior chamber）

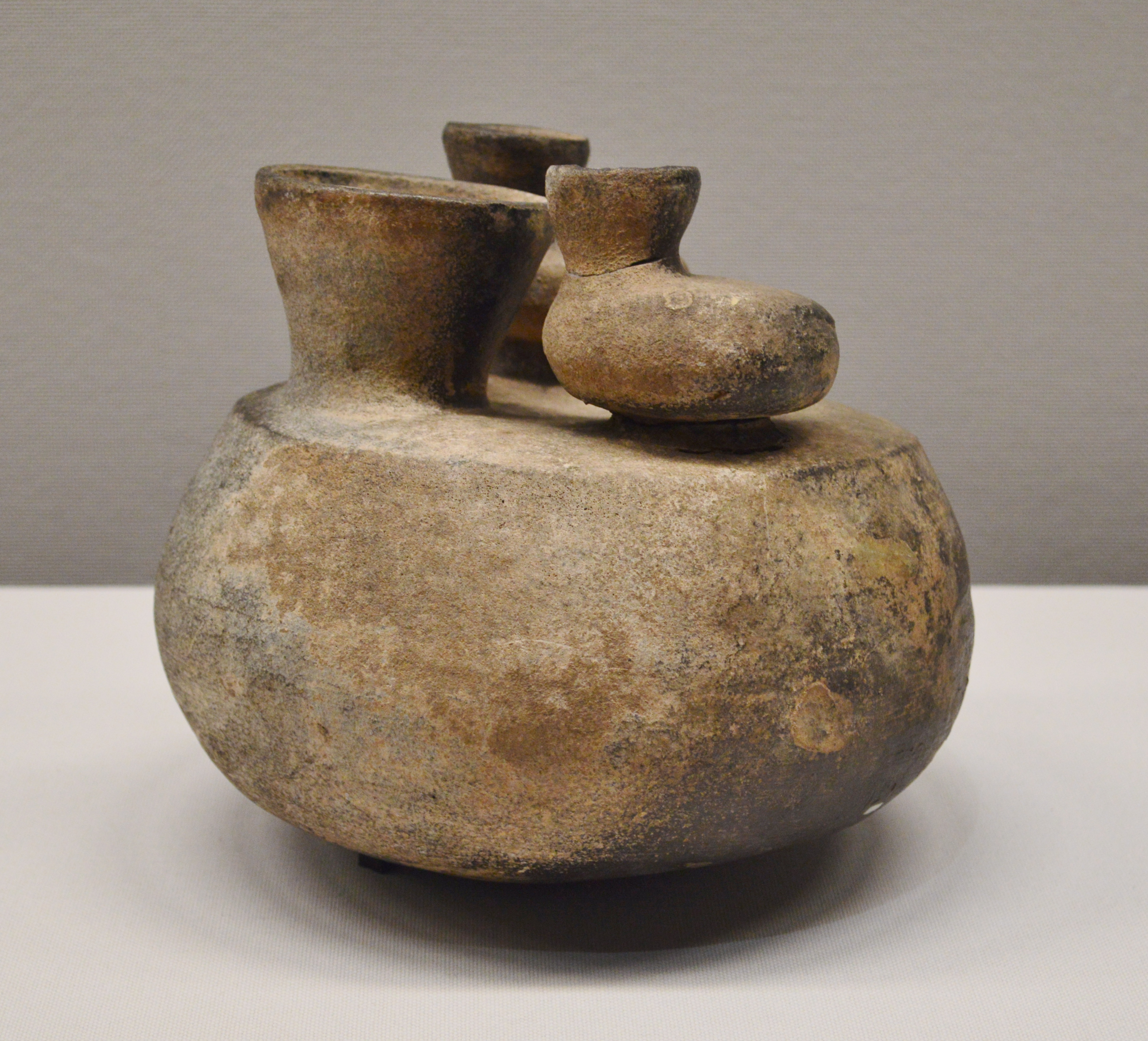
Sue ware pottery from Mitoshiro Kofun
at Tokyo National Museum

== See also ==
- List of Historic Sites of Japan (Hiroshima)
