= Teramachi temple ruins =

Nara period temple ruins in Miyoshi, Hiroshima, Japan

- 寺町廃寺跡 (Japanese)
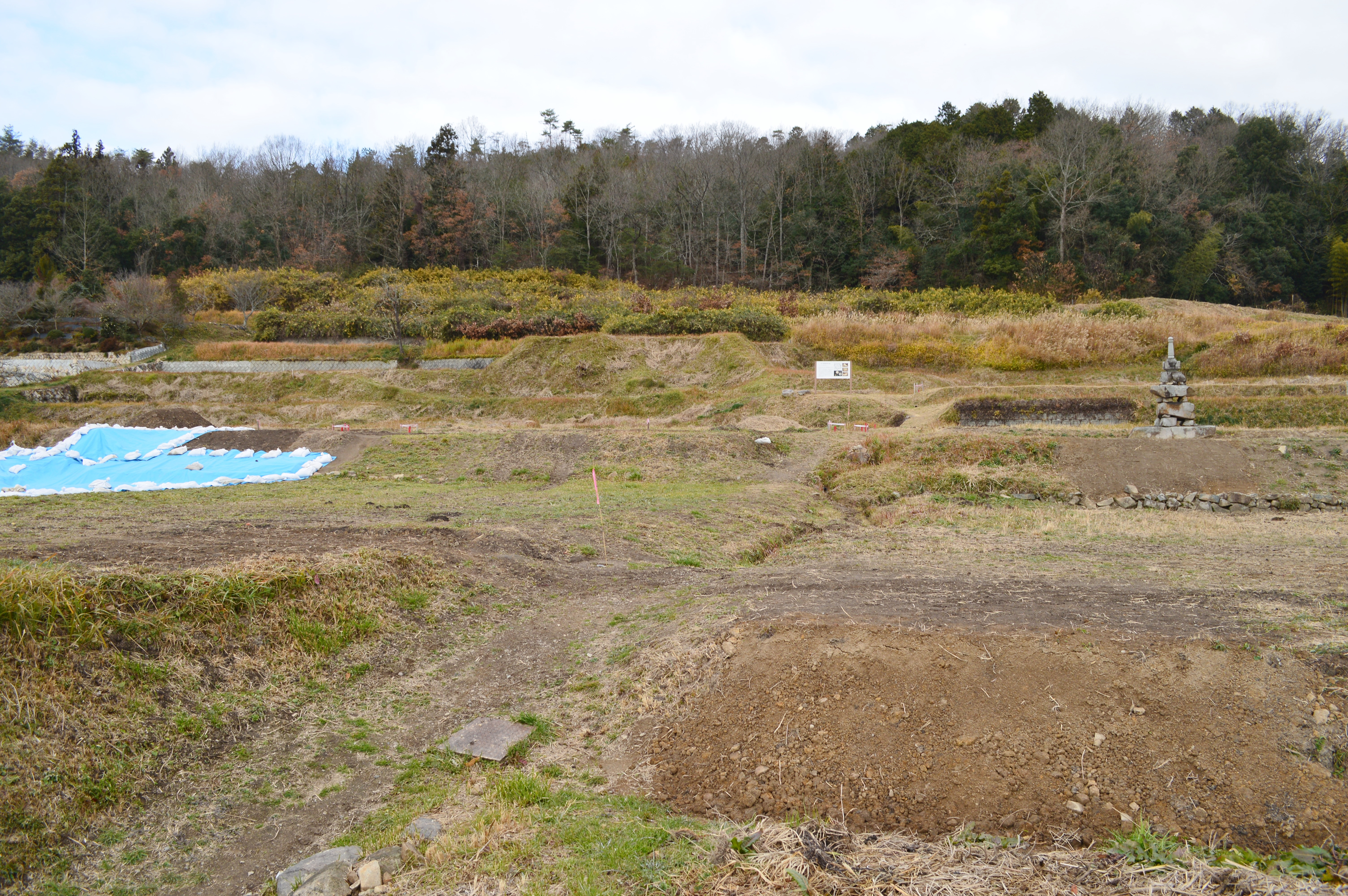
- Teramachi temple ruins

- Teramachi temple ruins Teramachi temple ruins (Japan)
- Interactive map of Teramachi temple ruins
- 34°47′6.40″N 132°56′11.35″E
- Type: temple ruin
- Periods: Asuka period
- Location: Miyoshi, Hiroshima, Japan
- Region: San'yō region

History
- Built: c.7th century

Site notes
- Public access: Yes (park)

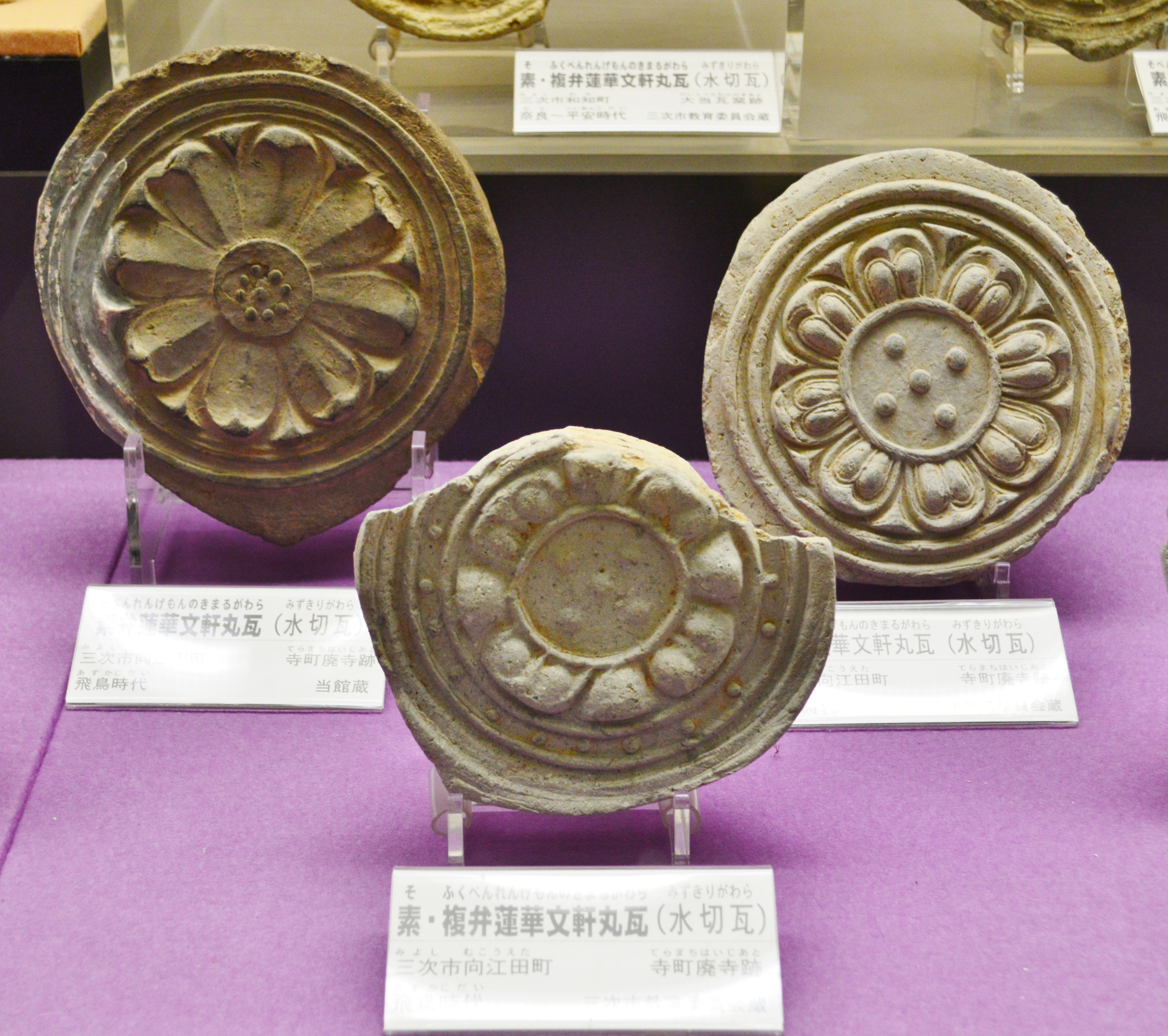
Roof Tiles from the Teramachi temple ruins

The Teramachi temple ruins (寺町廃寺跡, Teramachi Haiji ato) is an archaeological site with the ruins of a Hakuho period Buddhist temple located in the Mukaeda neighbourhood of what is now the city of Miyoshi, Hiroshima, in the San'yō region of Japan. The temple no longer exists, but the temple grounds were designated as a National Historic Site in 1984.

== History ==
The Teramachi temple ruins date from the Hakuho period to the early Heian period, and are located on the southern slope of a hill at an elevation of 240 meters at the eastern end of the Miyoshi Basin between the Maarai River and the Kunikane River. Archaeological excavations from 1979 to 1982 and 2018 revealed that the temple had a layout patterned after the temple of Hokki-ji in Ikaruga, Nara, with a pagoda to the east, the Kondō to the west, and the Lecture Hall to the north. The pagoda had a base measuring 11 meters square, the Kondō was 15.7 meters east–west by 13.4 meters north–south, and the Lecture Hall 25.1 meters east–west by 14.7 meters north–south. It is presumed that there was a middle gate and a south gate, but these foundations have not been confirmed to date; however, the remains of the cloister with a width of four meters extending from the Lecture Hall has been located. The site was one square Chō, or roughly 108 meters square.

Excavated artifacts included roof tiles with a lotus design, shibi roof ornaments, fragments of Sue ware, Haji ware and sancai pottery from the late Tang China, and fragments of Buddhist statues. The name of the temple and its history are uncertain; however, as the round roof tiles are of the "Kudara style", the site has tentatively been identified as the Bingo Mitani-ji Temple (三谷寺) as described in the Nara period "Nihon Ryoiki". It is presumed to have been abolished around the beginning of the 9th century in the early Heian period, as no artifacts have been found past that point in time.

About 1.2 kilometers northwest of the temple site, is the ruins of the Daito Kawaragama, which supplied the roof tiles for the abandoned temple, The site is now part of the Miyoshi Fudoki No Oka Park (広島県立みよし風土記の丘) and is located about five minutes by car from Shiomachi Station on the JR West Geibi Line.

== See also ==
- List of Historic Sites of Japan (Hiroshima)
