= Chiwen =

Chinese dragon

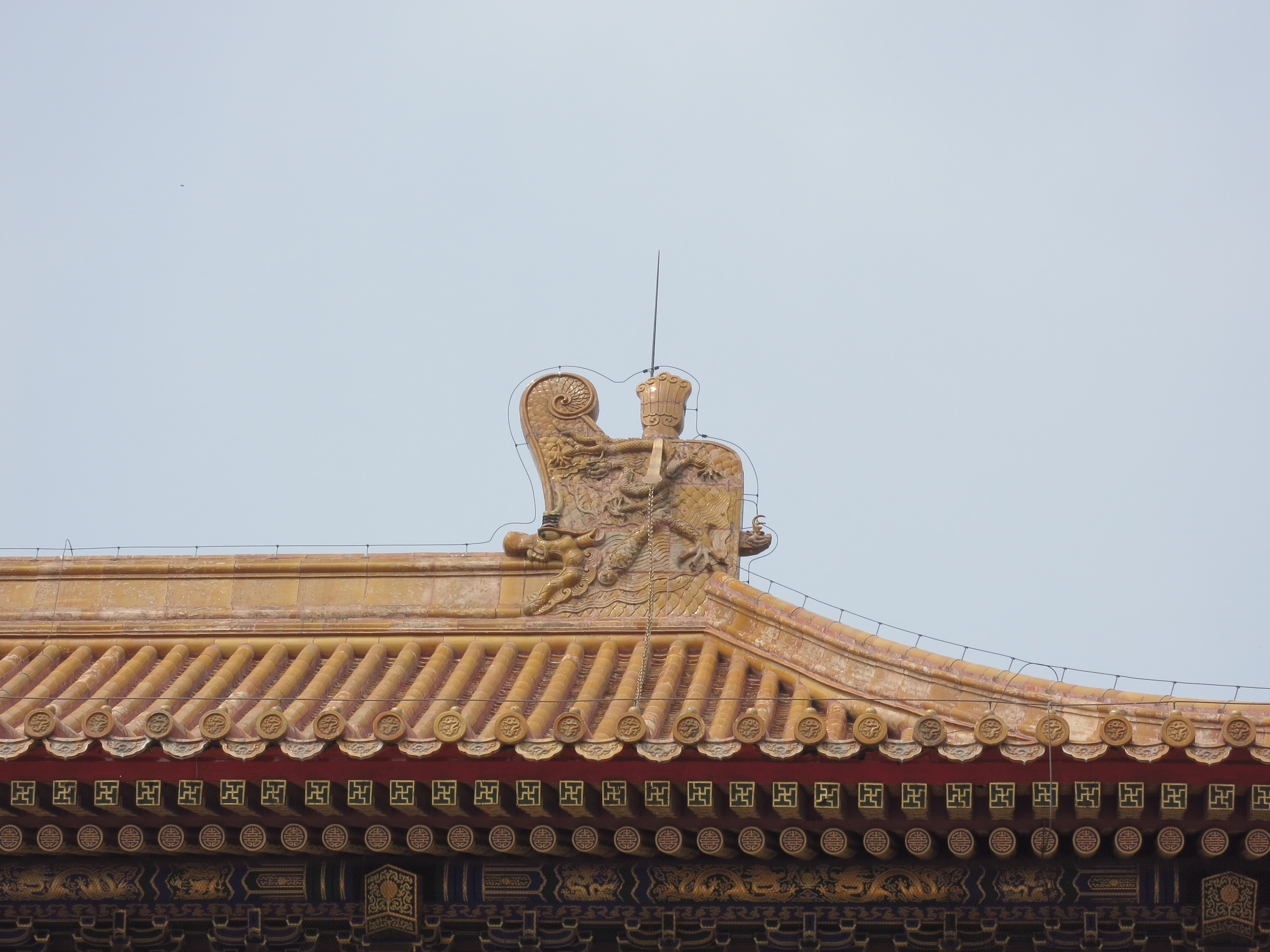
Chiwen roof-ornament on the Hall of Supreme Harmony, Beijing.

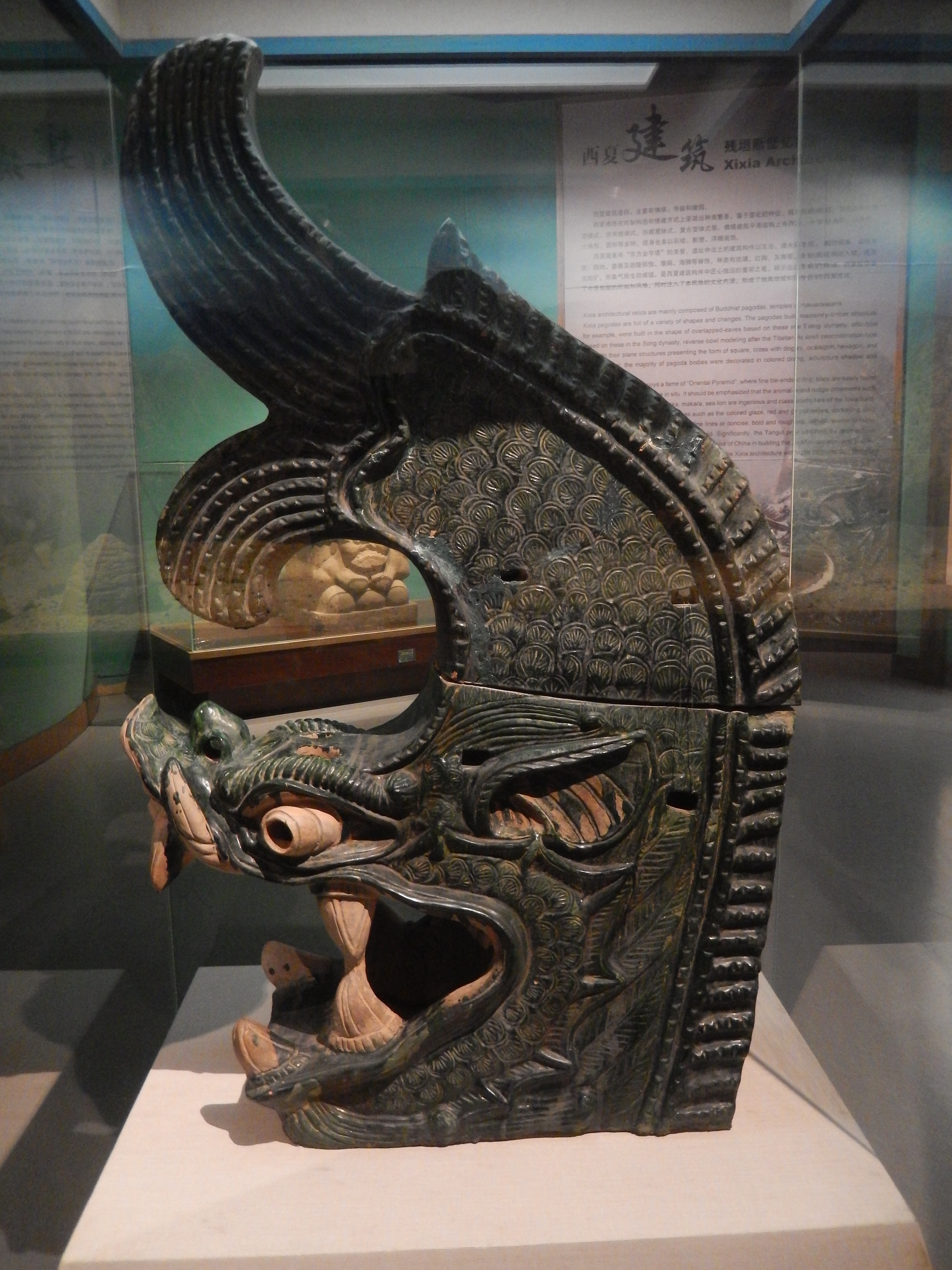
Glazed chiwen of Western Xia.

Chiwen (Chinese: 蚩吻; pinyin: chīwěn; Wade–Giles: ch'ih-wen; lit. 'hornless-dragon mouth') is a roof ornamental motif in traditional Chinese architecture and art. Chiwen is also the name of a Chinese dragon that mixes features of a fish, and in Chinese mythology is one of the nine sons of the dragon, which are also used as imperial roof decorations. As architectural ornaments or waterspouts, they are comparable with Western gargoyles, but are not related to the mythological character.

== Etymology ==
The name for this dragon is chīwěn (蚩吻), which compounds chī (蚩; 'hornless dragon', 'young dragon') and wěn (吻; 'animal's mouth'). Chīshǒu (螭首) and Chītóu (螭頭), both literally meaning "hornless-dragon head".

Chiwen is alternatively written 鴟吻; 'owl mouth', using the homophonous character chī (鴟; 'owl', 'bird of prey'). The chīwěi (鴟尾; 'owl tail') and chīméng (鴟甍; 'owl roof-ridge') are additional birdlike roof decorations.

== History ==
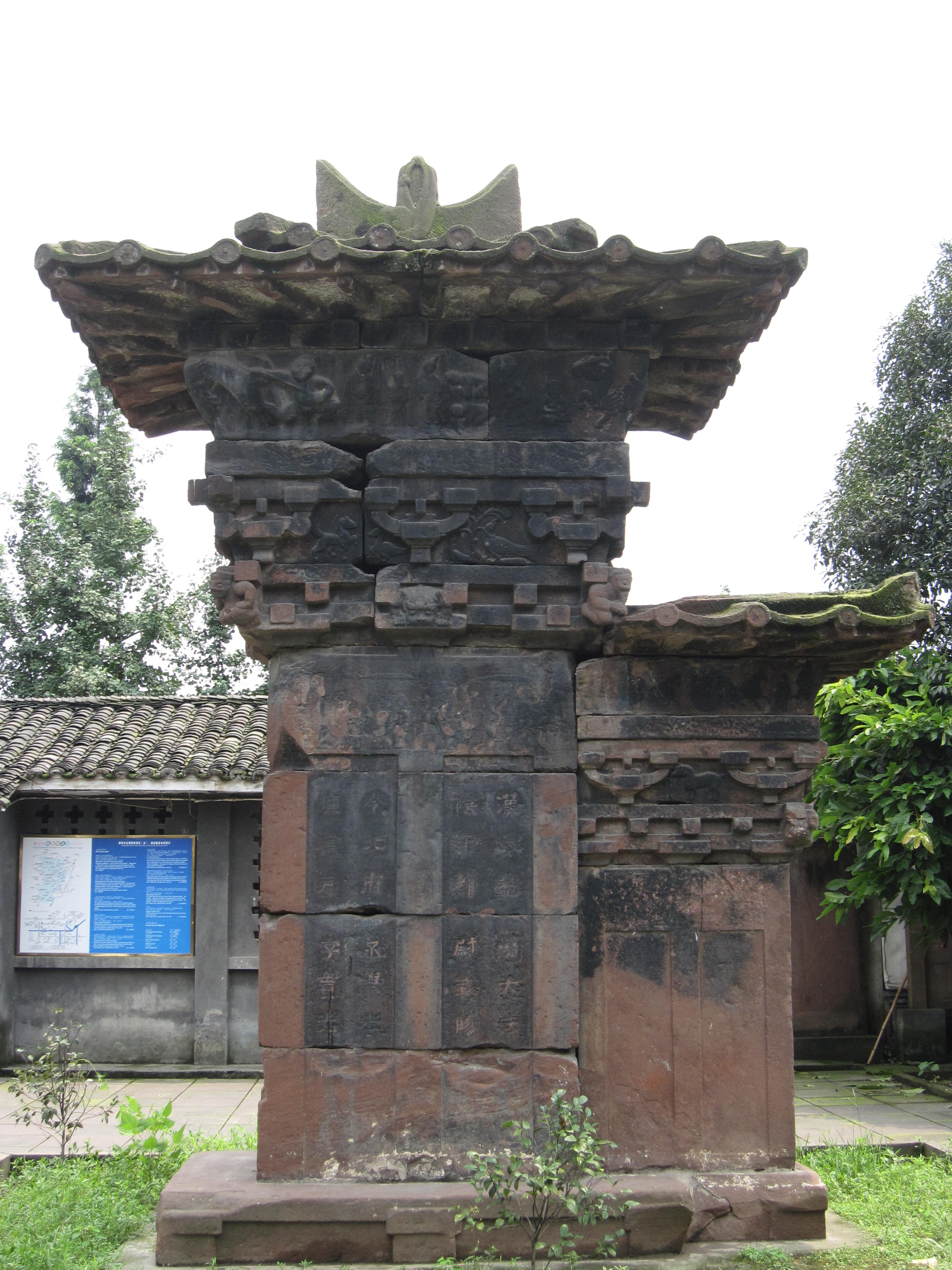
Chiwei on Gaoyi Que, Han dynasty.

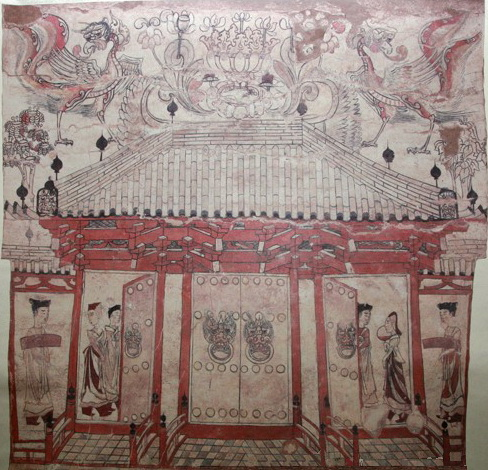
Northern Qi tomb mural showing building with chiwei roof ornamentation.

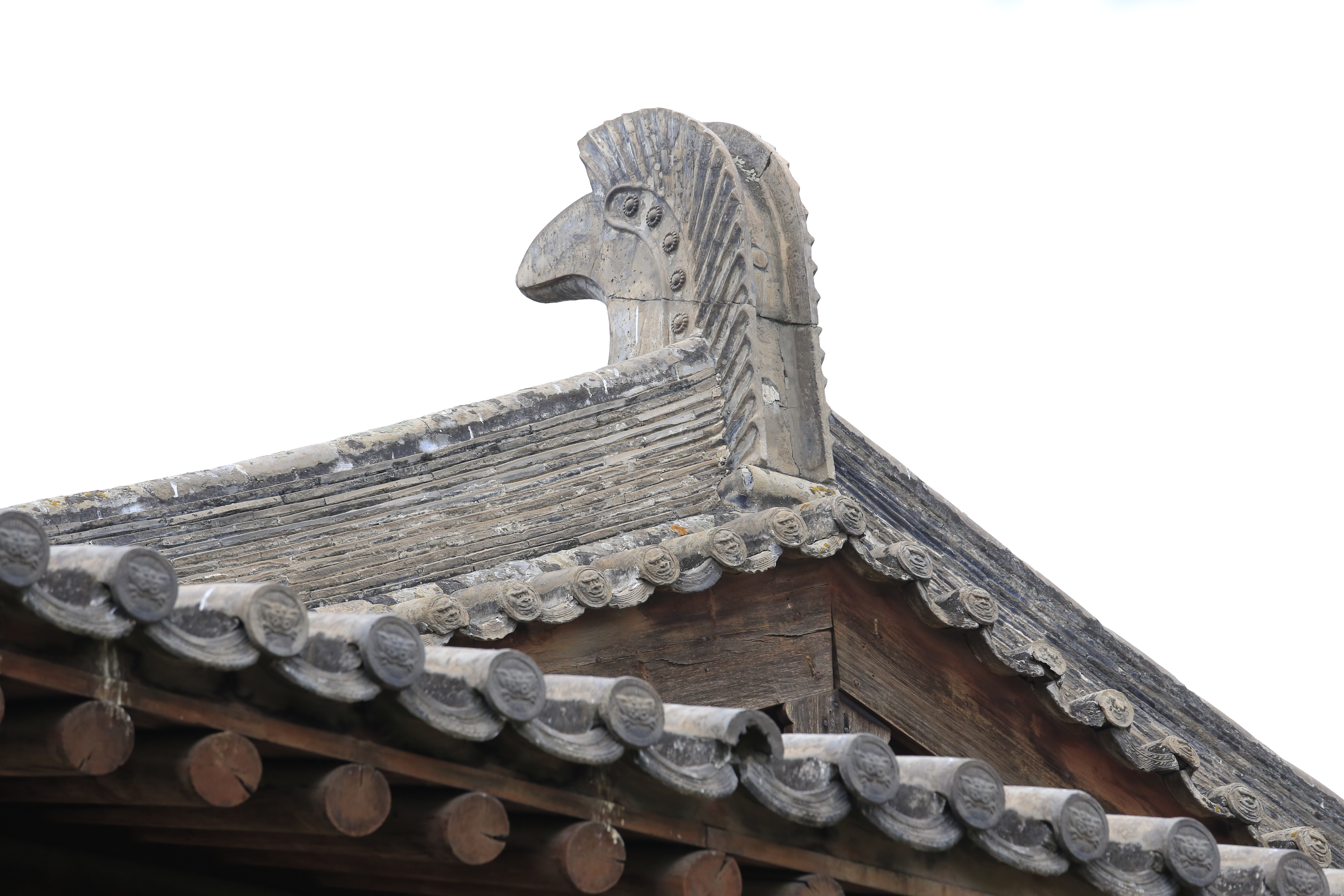
Tang dynasty Chiwei on the roof of Nanchan Temple.

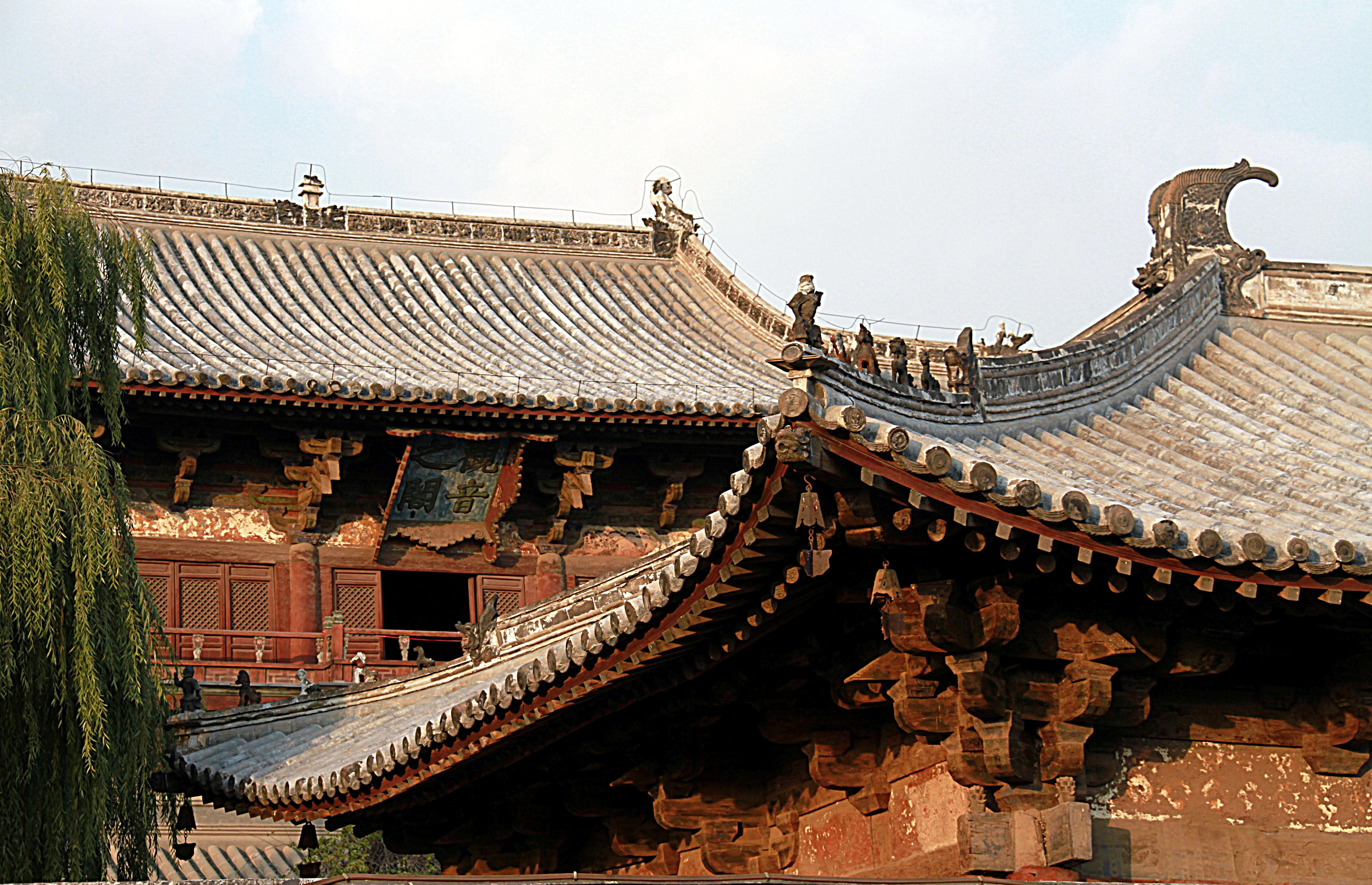
Liao dynasty roof ornamentations of Dule Temple

The origin of the roof decoration of chiwen can be traced to the roof decoration alternatively named as chiwei (鸱尾), the earliest visual examples found in the Han dynasty on many ceramic architectural models, que-towers, and tomb murals and stone-reliefs.

The chiwei were shaped like wings, associated with the Zhuque, also a commonly used as a roof ornamental motif during the Han dynasty. Chiwei was adopted as roof ornaments on palaces, temples and official buildings throughout the Three Kingdoms to Northern and Southern dynasties, later expanded to be used by private manors of nobility in the Tang dynasty. With the appearance and formal use of glazed roof tiles in the Tang dynasty, chiwei were also often glazed in green and blue colors, as seen often in the murals of Mogao Grottoes. Over the course of the mid-Tang dynasty, the fish-like chiwen became another prevailing ornamental motif alongside the chiwei.

In the Song dynasty, chiwen fully replaced the chiwei and adopted a more dragon-like appearance while also retaining some of their predecessor's bird-like features such as wings or bird's head. The technical treastise Yingzao Fashi details the proper elements and terminology of the chiwen and formalises their construction and measurements.

By the Ming and Qing dynasties, the chiwen was widely used in traditional architecture, their bodies and tail turning more inwards and became very ornate in appearance, with many variations based on regional styles and colors.

== Symbolism ==
The chiwen is listed second or third among the Lóng shēng jiǔzǐ (龍生九子; 'dragon gives birth to nine young'), "Nine Dragons" (九龍; jiǔlóng), which are traditional mythological creatures that have become traditional Chinese feng shui architectural decorations. Each one of the nine dragons has a protective function. The Nine dragons are also used in many place names in Hong Kong, such as Kowloon, literally meaning "nine dragons" in Cantonese (Chinese: 九龍; Jyutping: gau2 lung4; Cantonese Yale: Gáulùhng), as well as numerous lakes, rivers and hamlets in mainland China.

According to the Ming Dynasty Wuzazu (五雜俎) "The ch'i-wen, which like swallowing, are placed on both ends of the ridgepoles of roofs (to swallow all evil influences)."

Welch describes chiwen as "the dragon who likes 'to swallow things'".

This is the fish-like, hornless dragon with a very truncated body and large, wide mouth usually found along roof ridges (as if swallowing the roof beams). His presence on roofs is also said to guard against fires. A paragraph in the Tang dynasty book Su Shi Yan Yi (蘇氏演義) by Su E (蘇鶚) says that a mythical sea creature called the chi wen [sic] was put on the roofs of buildings during the Han dynasty to protect the structures from fire hazards. This dragon is still found on the roofs of traditional Chinese homes today, protecting the inhabitants from fires.

In Fengshui theory, a chiwen or chiwei supposedly protects against not only fires, but also floods and typhoons.

The Japanese language borrowed these names for architectural roof decorations as Sino-Japanese vocabulary. Shibi 鴟尾 "ornamental roof-ridge tile" is more commonly used than chifun 蚩吻 or shifun 鴟吻. In Japanese mythology, the Shachihoko 鯱 (a mythical fish with a carp's arched tail, tiger's head, and dragon's scales) roof decoration is believed to cause rain and protect against fire. This 鯱 is a kokuji "Chinese character invented in Japan" that can also be read shachi for "orca".

== Gallery ==
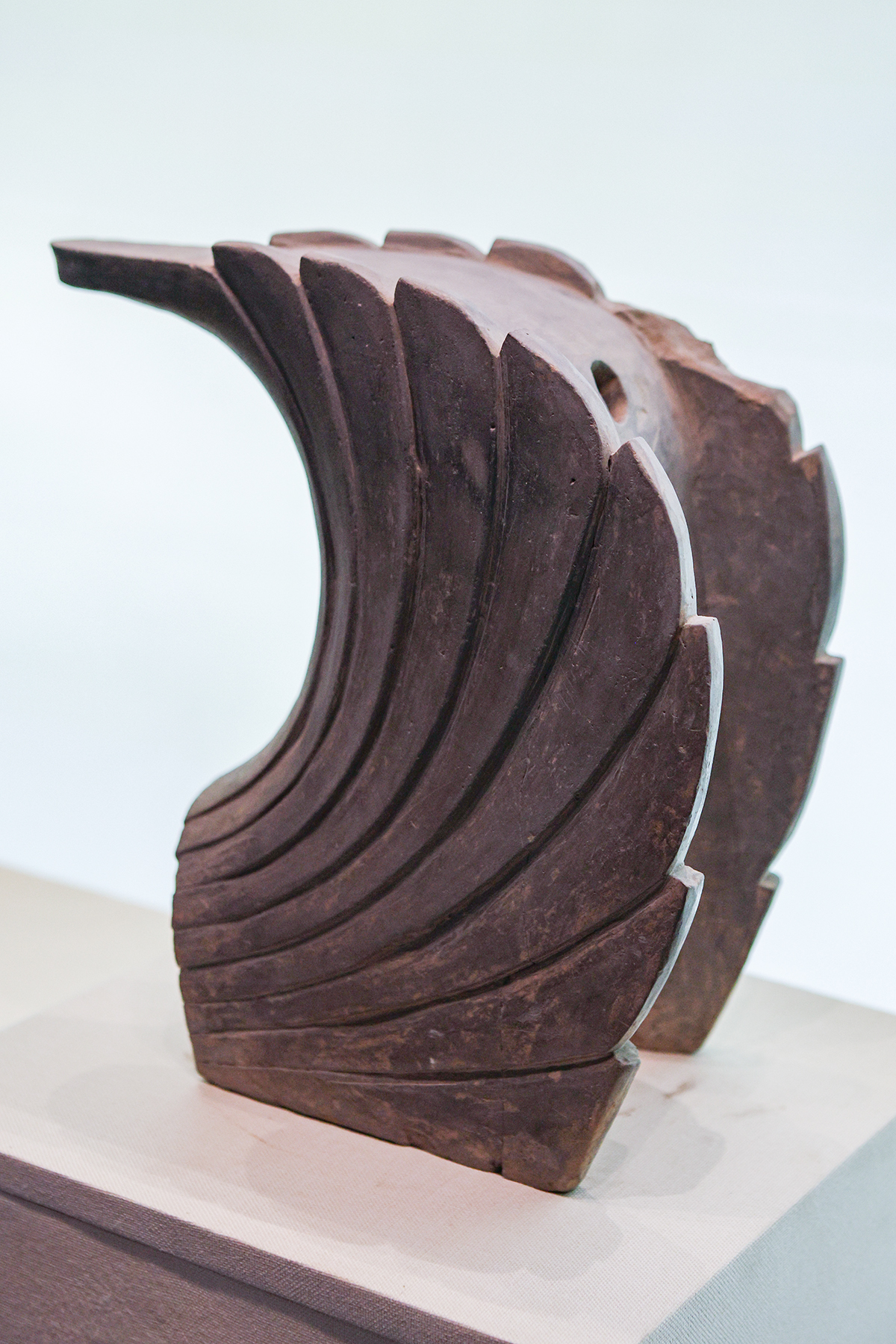
Eastern Wei to Northern Qi chiwei

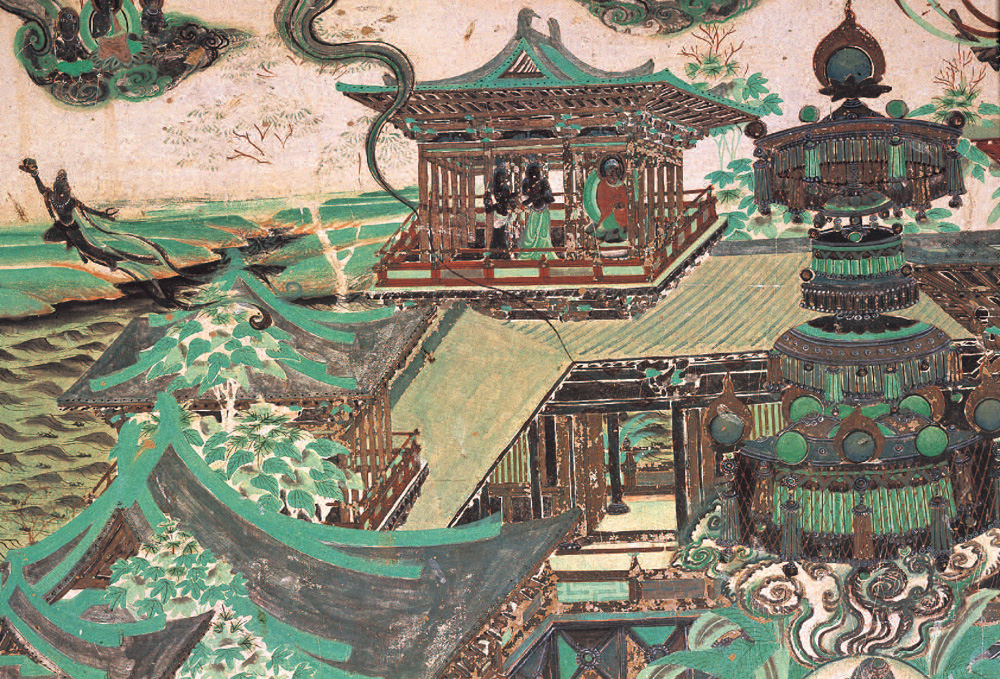
Tang dynasty fresco from Mogao caves depicting green glazed chiwei on architecture.

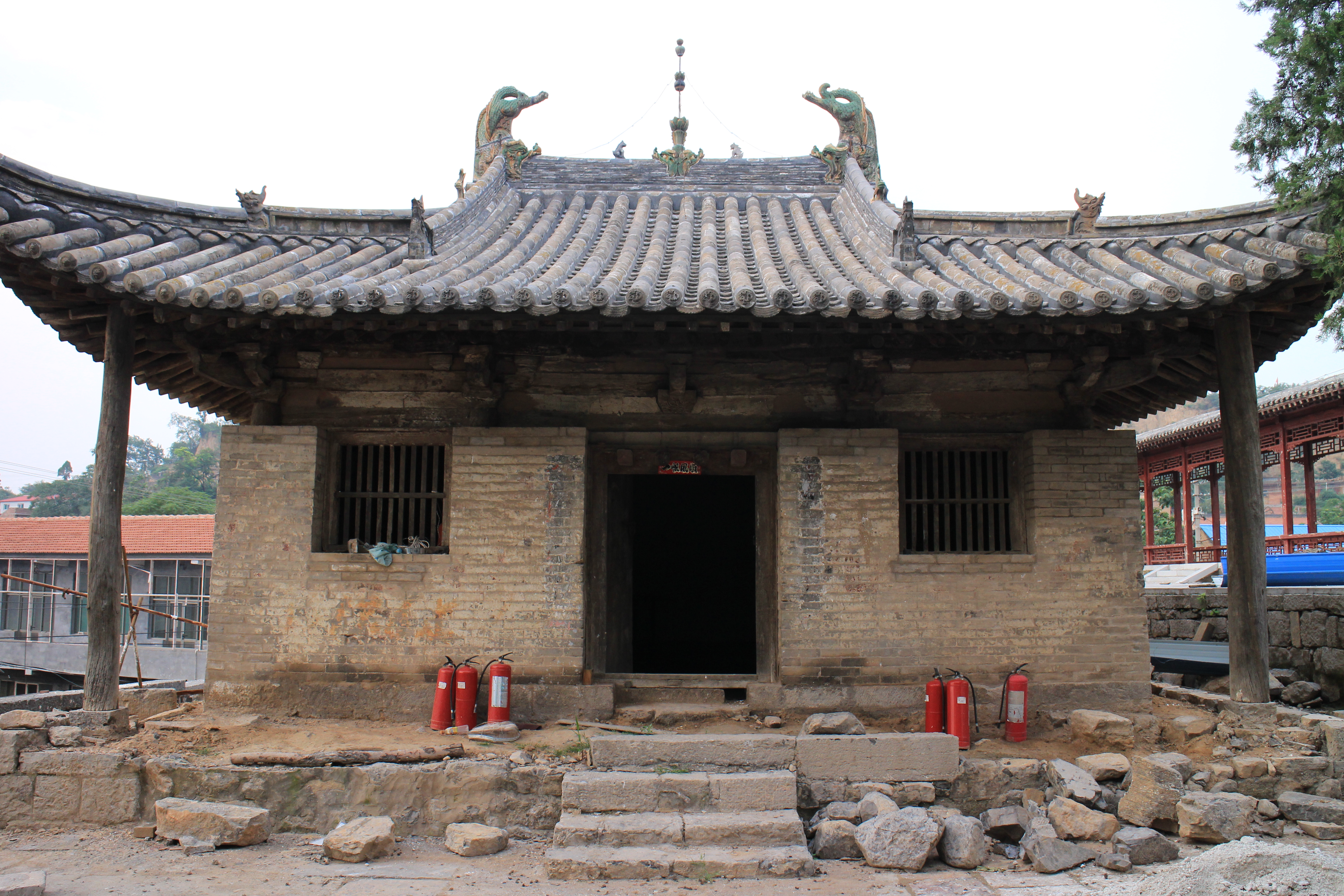
Tang dynasty Chiwen on Pingshun Temple.

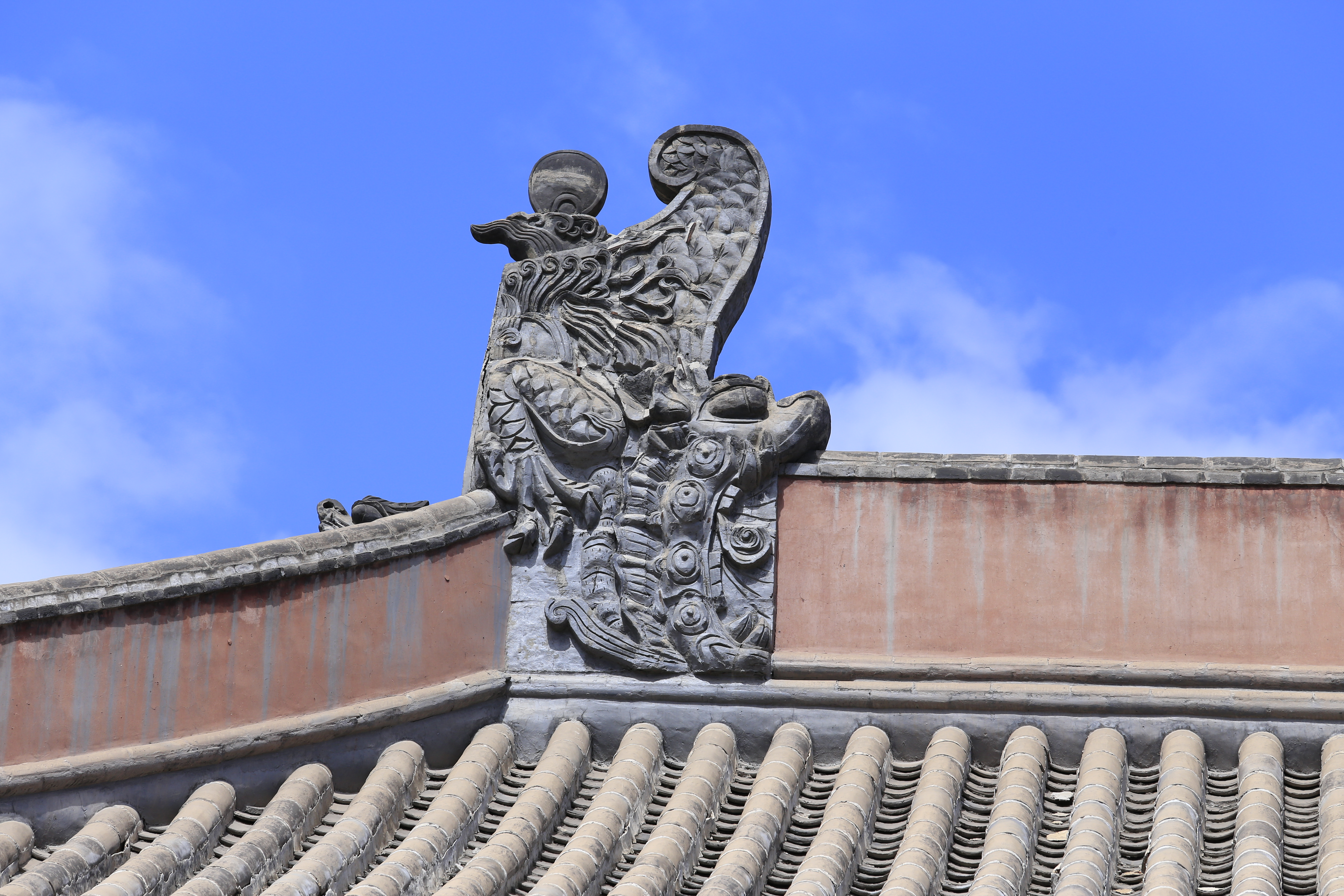
Liao dynasty chiwen of Shanhua Temple Main Hall.

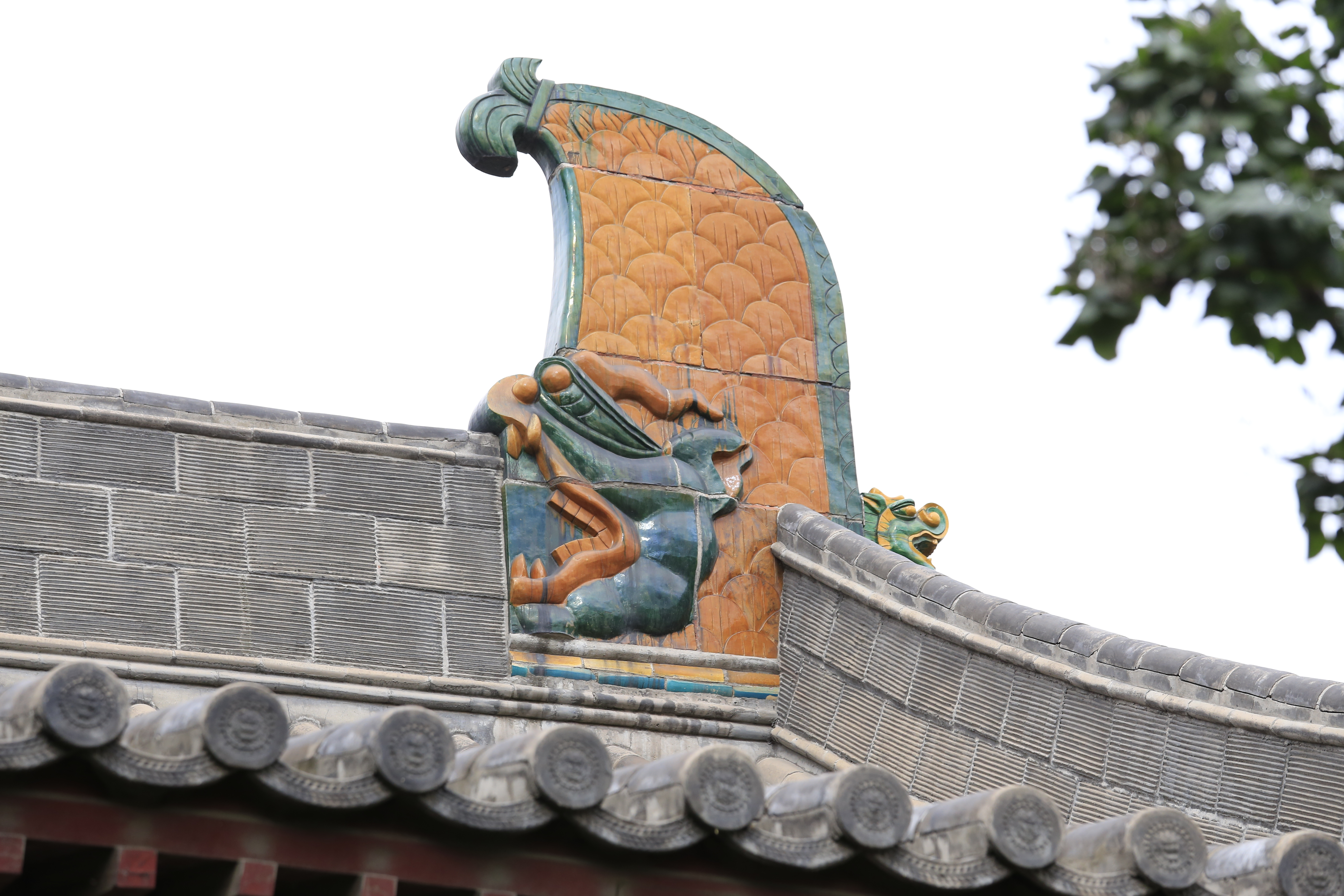
Liao dynasty glazed chiwen on Hall of Bhaisajyaguru, Huayan Temple

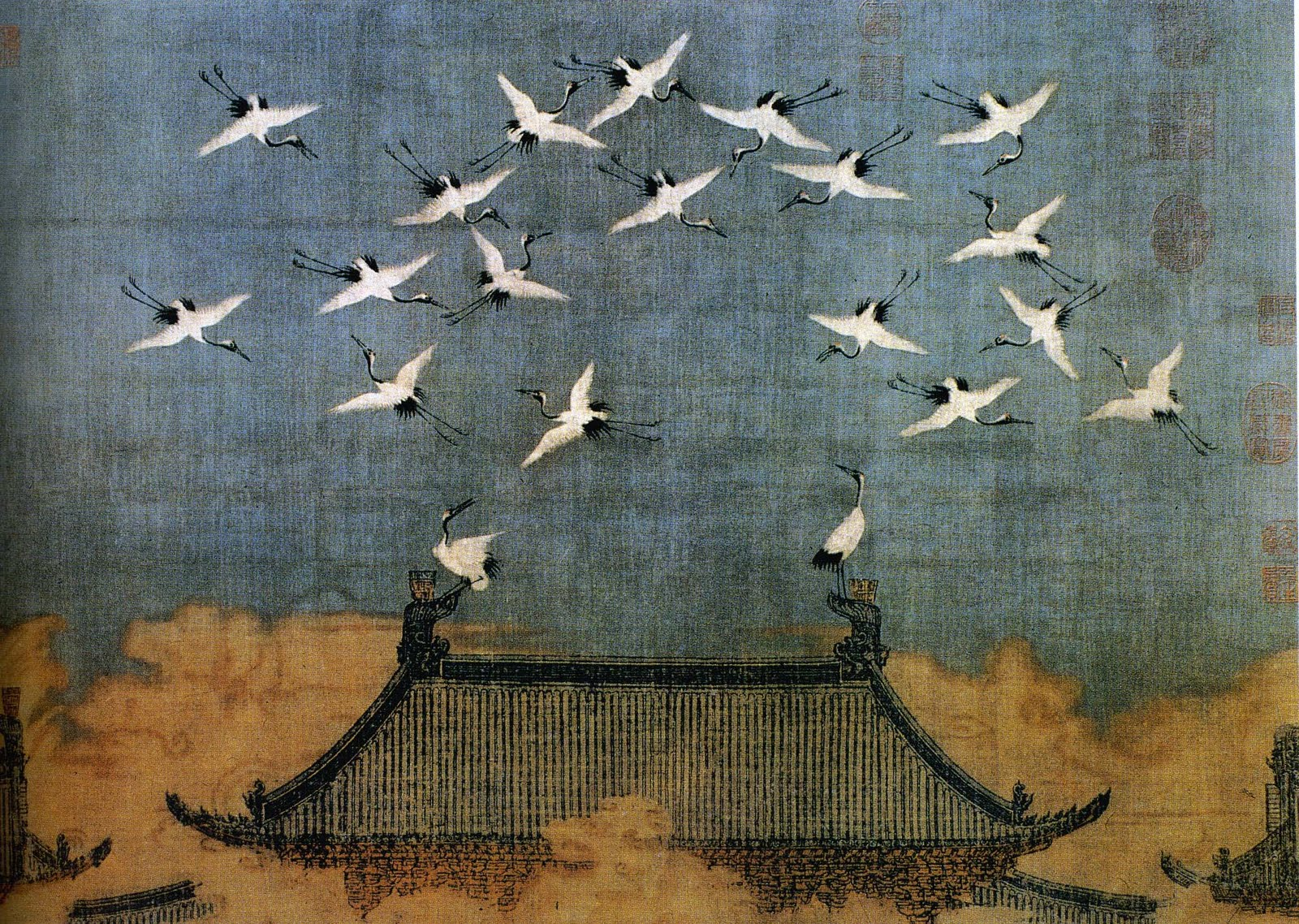
Song dynasty painting of Kaifeng palace rooftop.

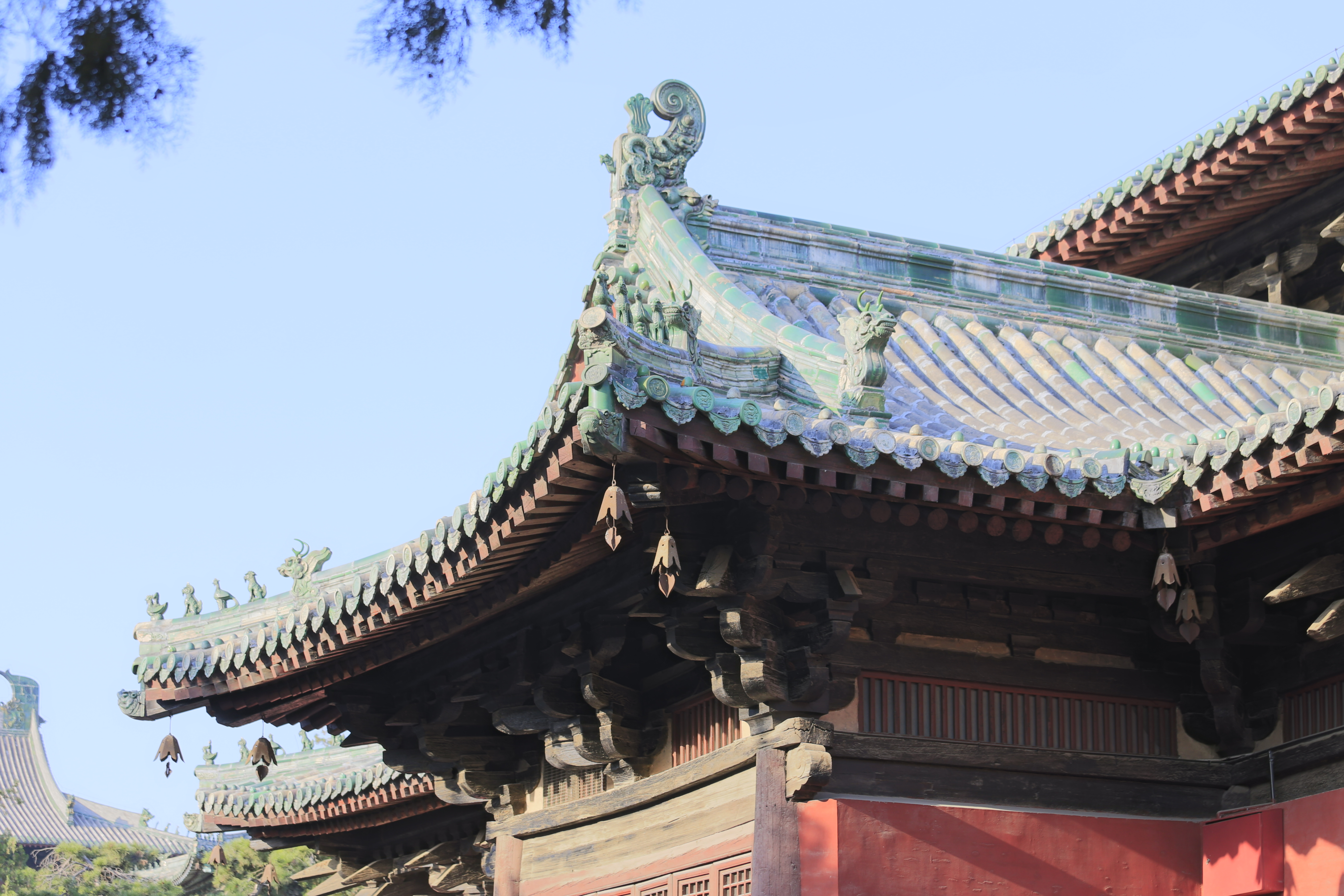
Song dynasty green glazed chiwen on the Manichaean Hall of Longxing temple in Zhengding, Hebei.

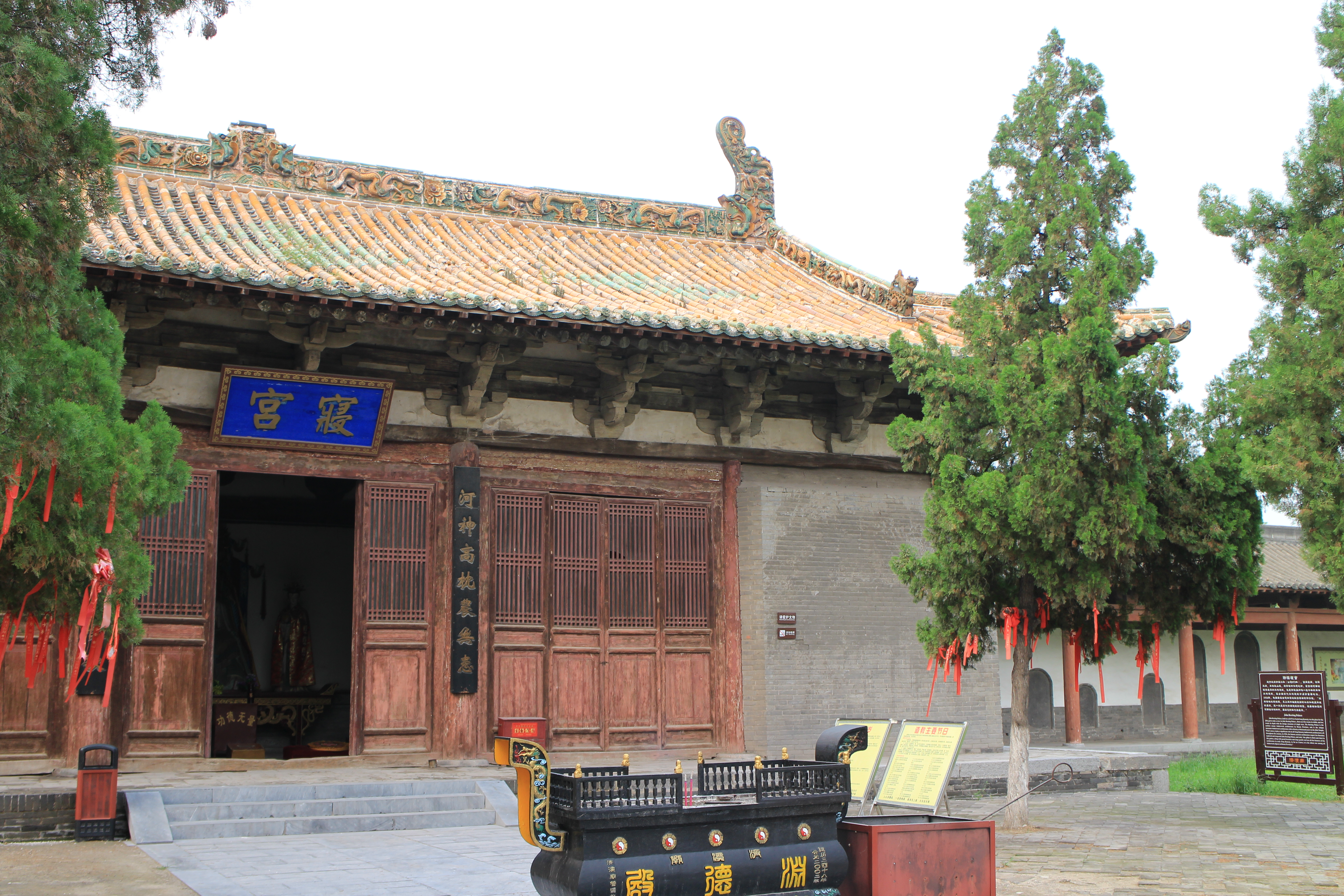
Song dynasty glazed chiwen on Jidu Temple

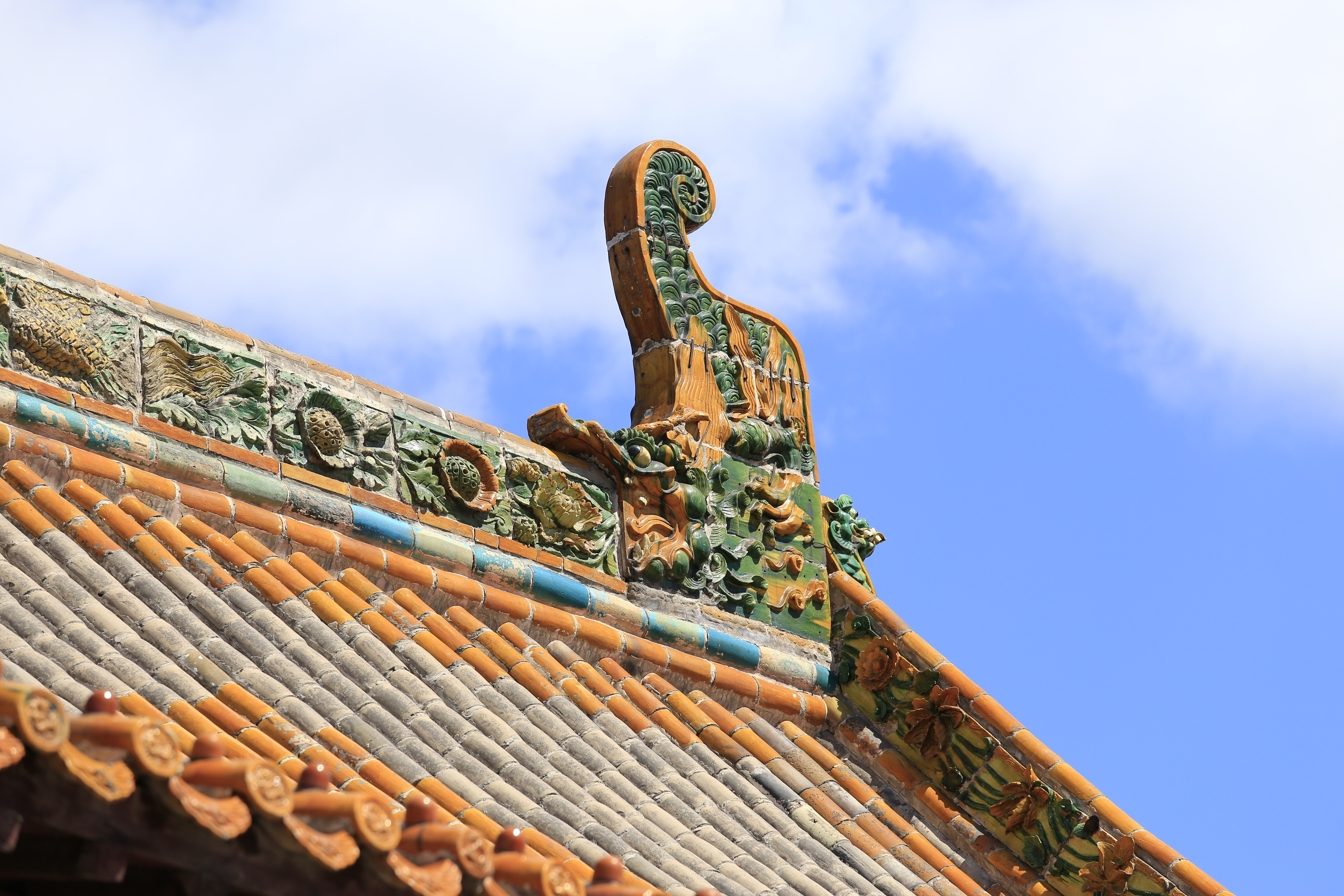
Ming dynasty glazed chiwen of Datong Confucian Temple.

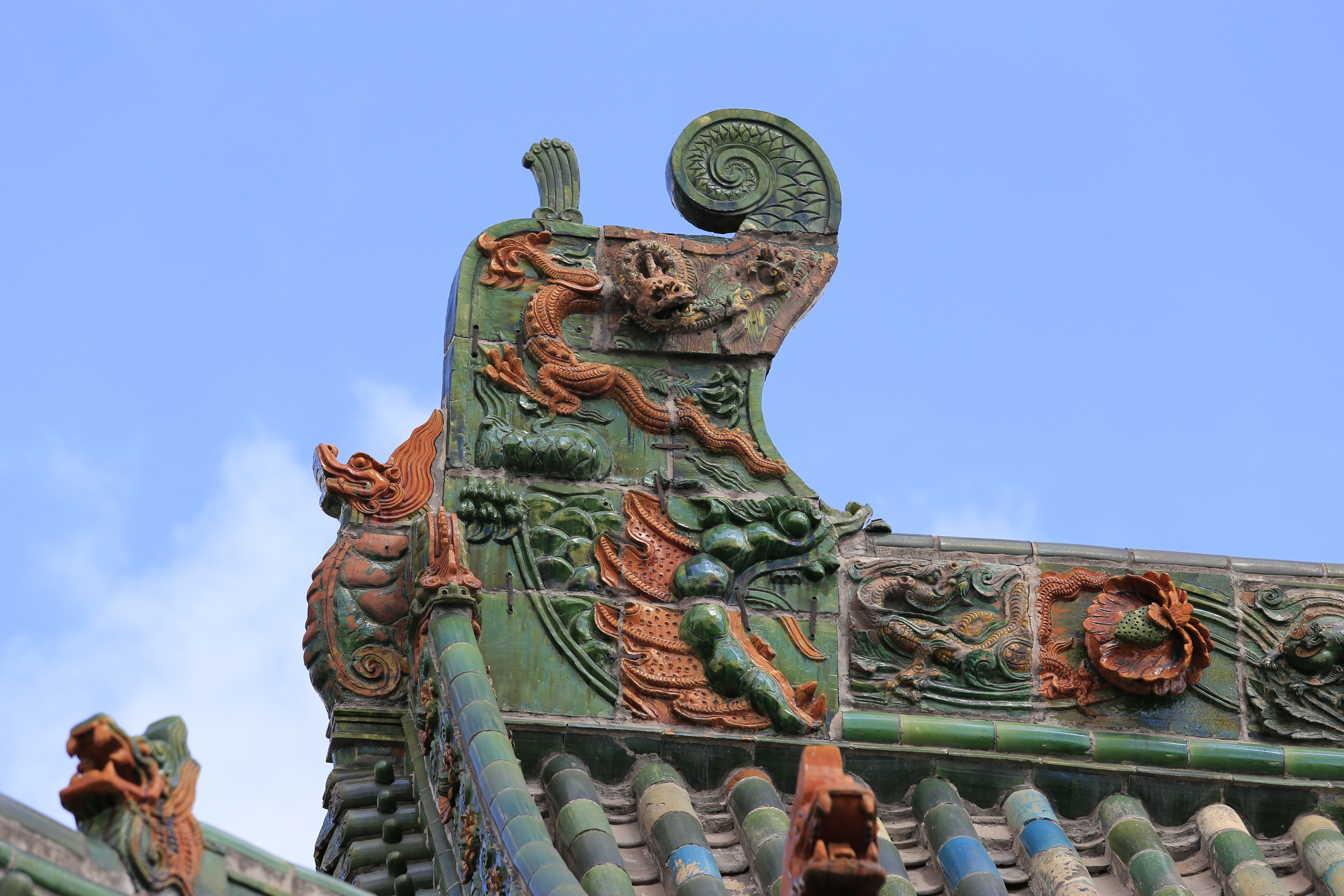
Yuan dynasty glazed chiwen of Datong Guandi Temple.

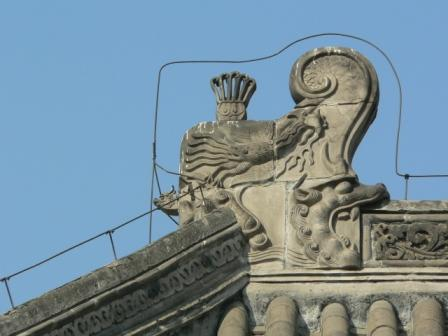
Qing dynasty chiwen.

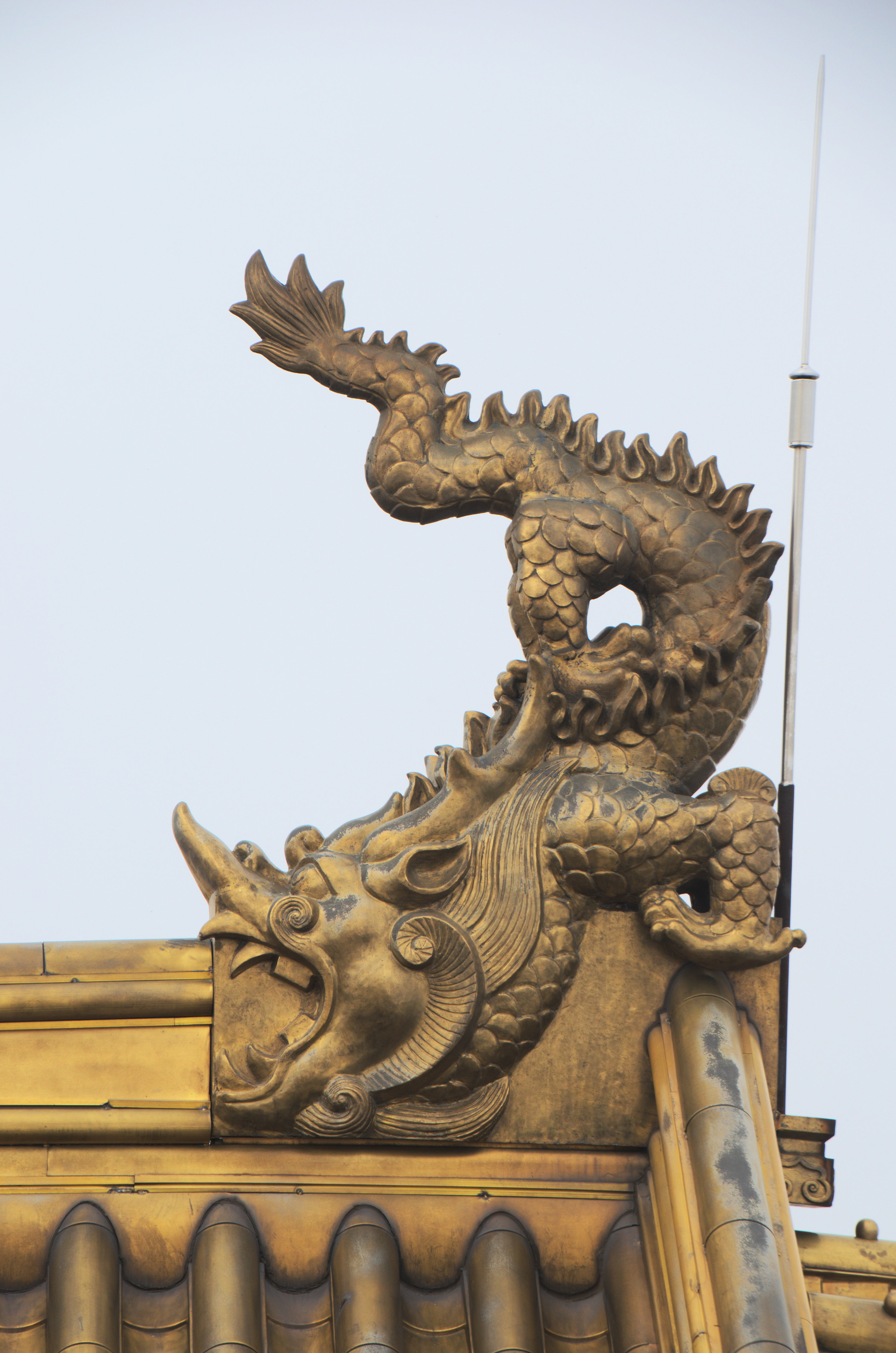
Dragon shaped golden chiwen at Emeishan

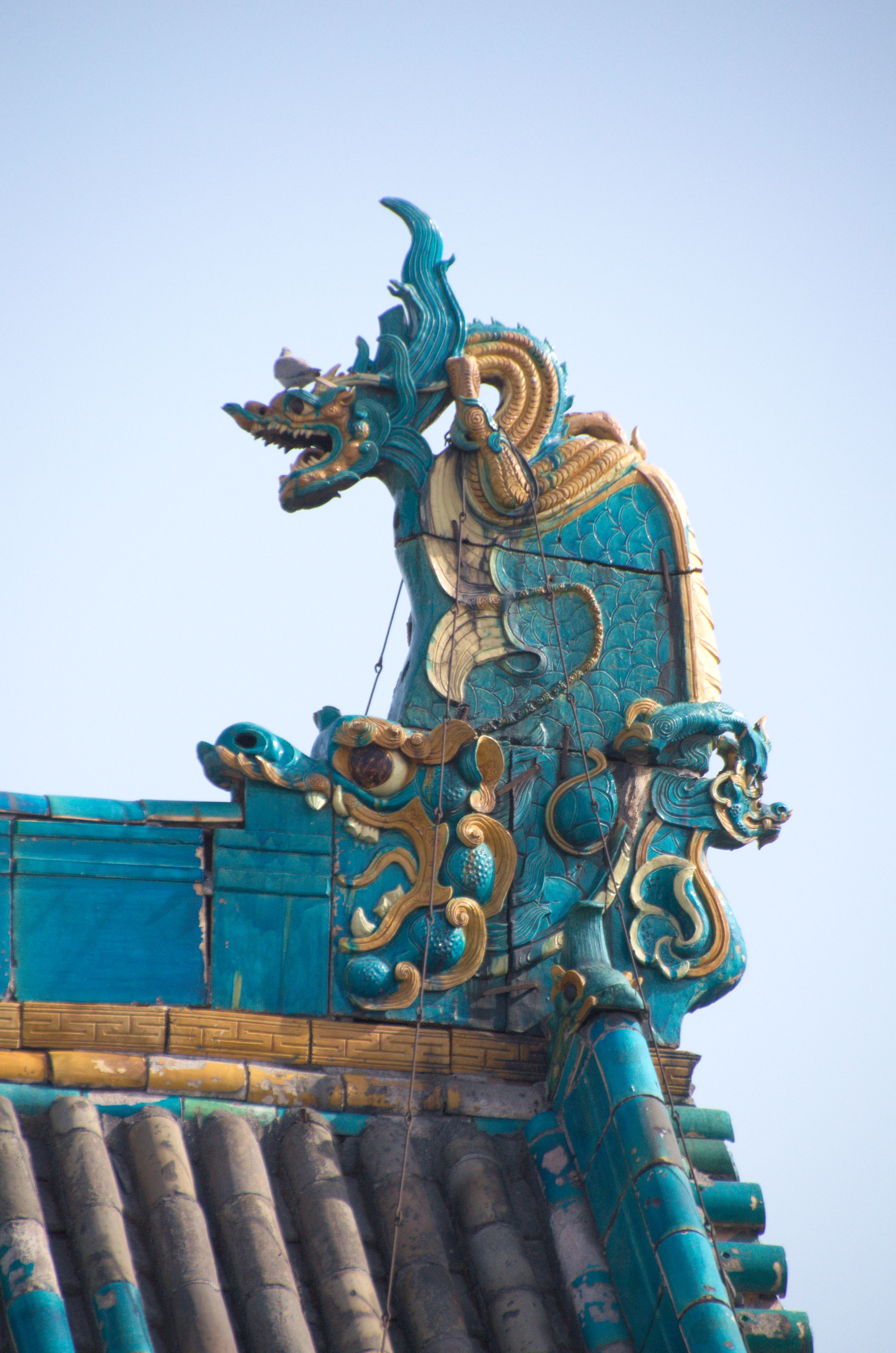
Glazed blue chiwen of Chenghuang Temple of Pingyao.

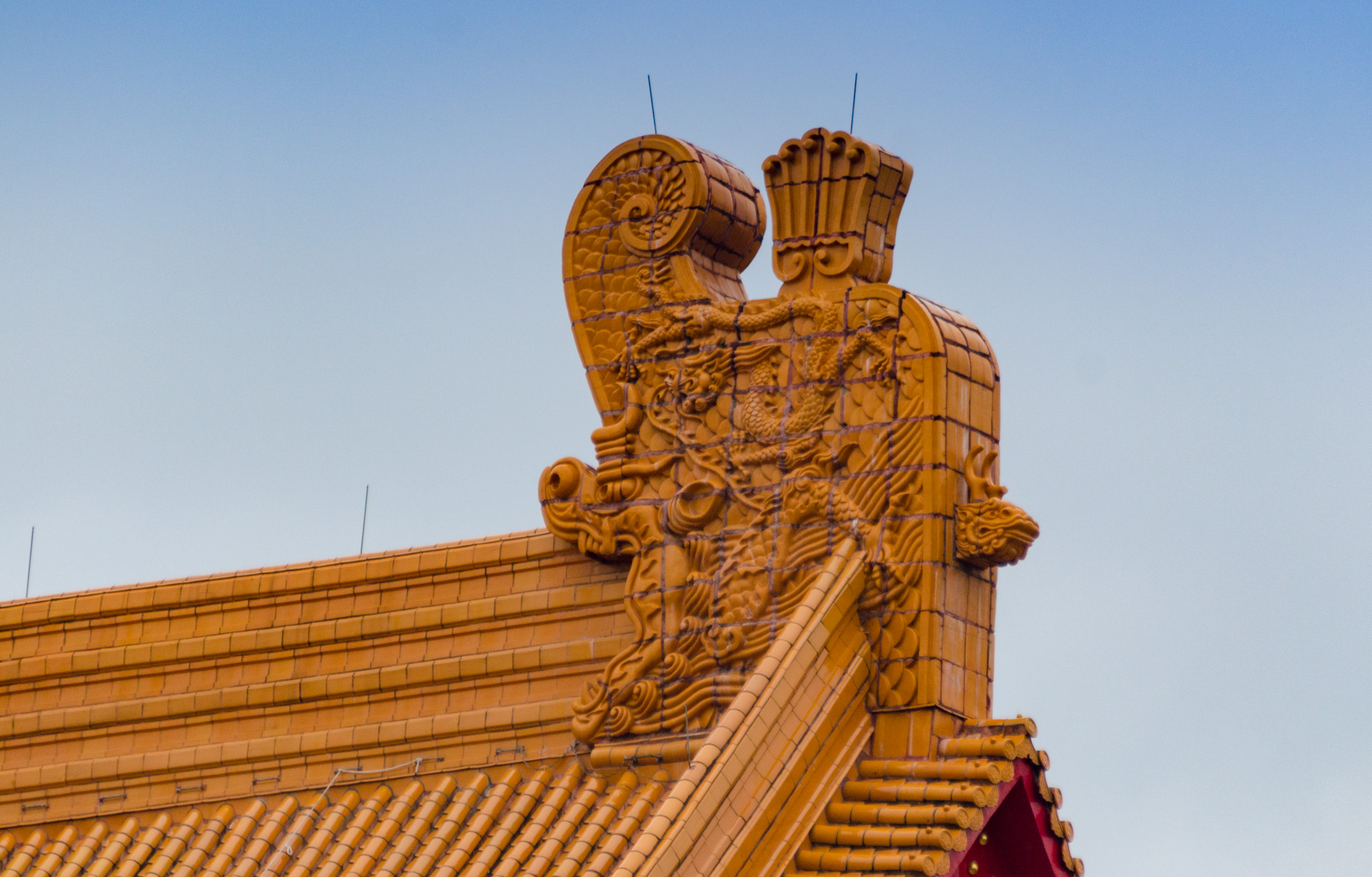
Chiwen on roof of the National Theater of Taiwan.

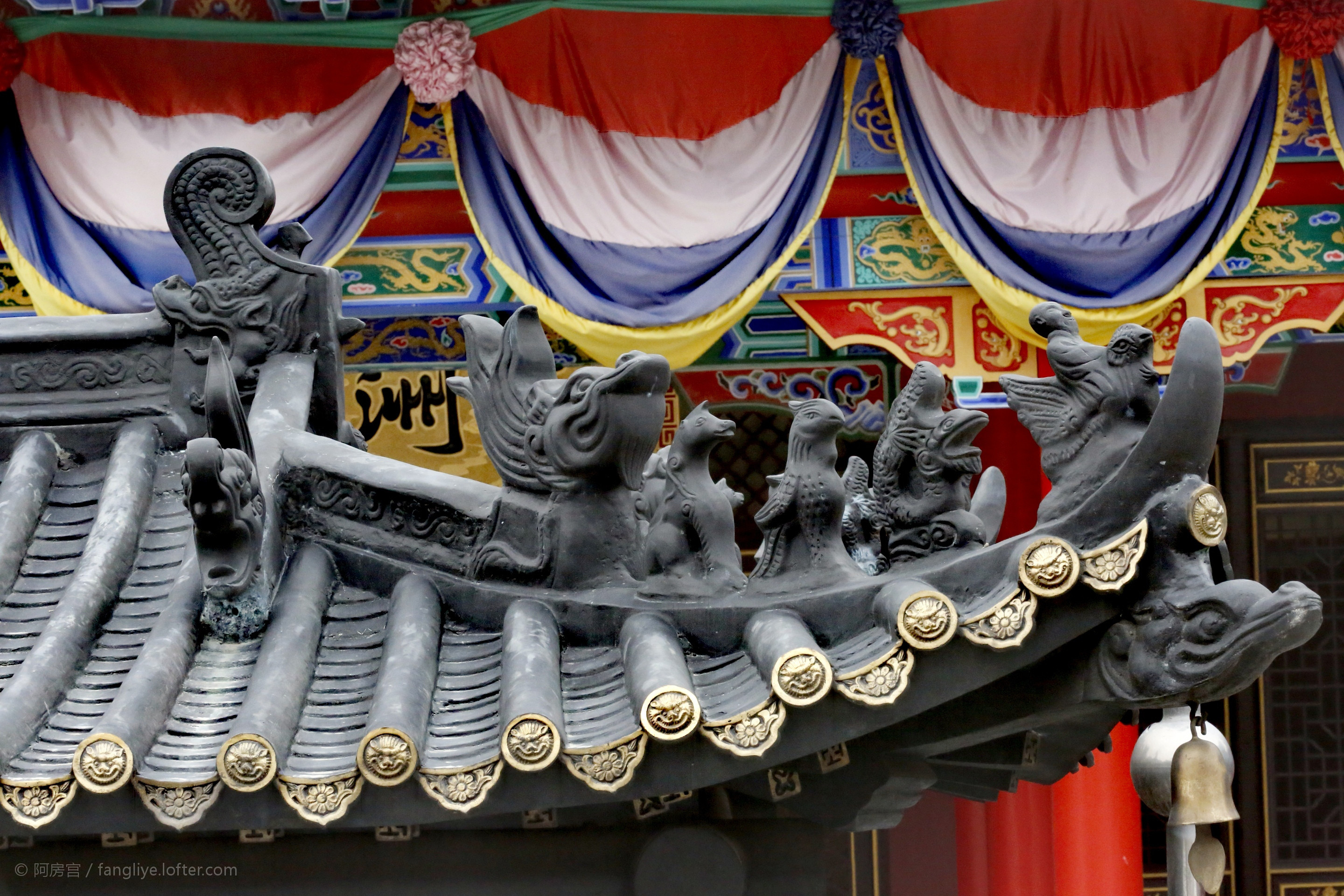
Xiangyin Temple

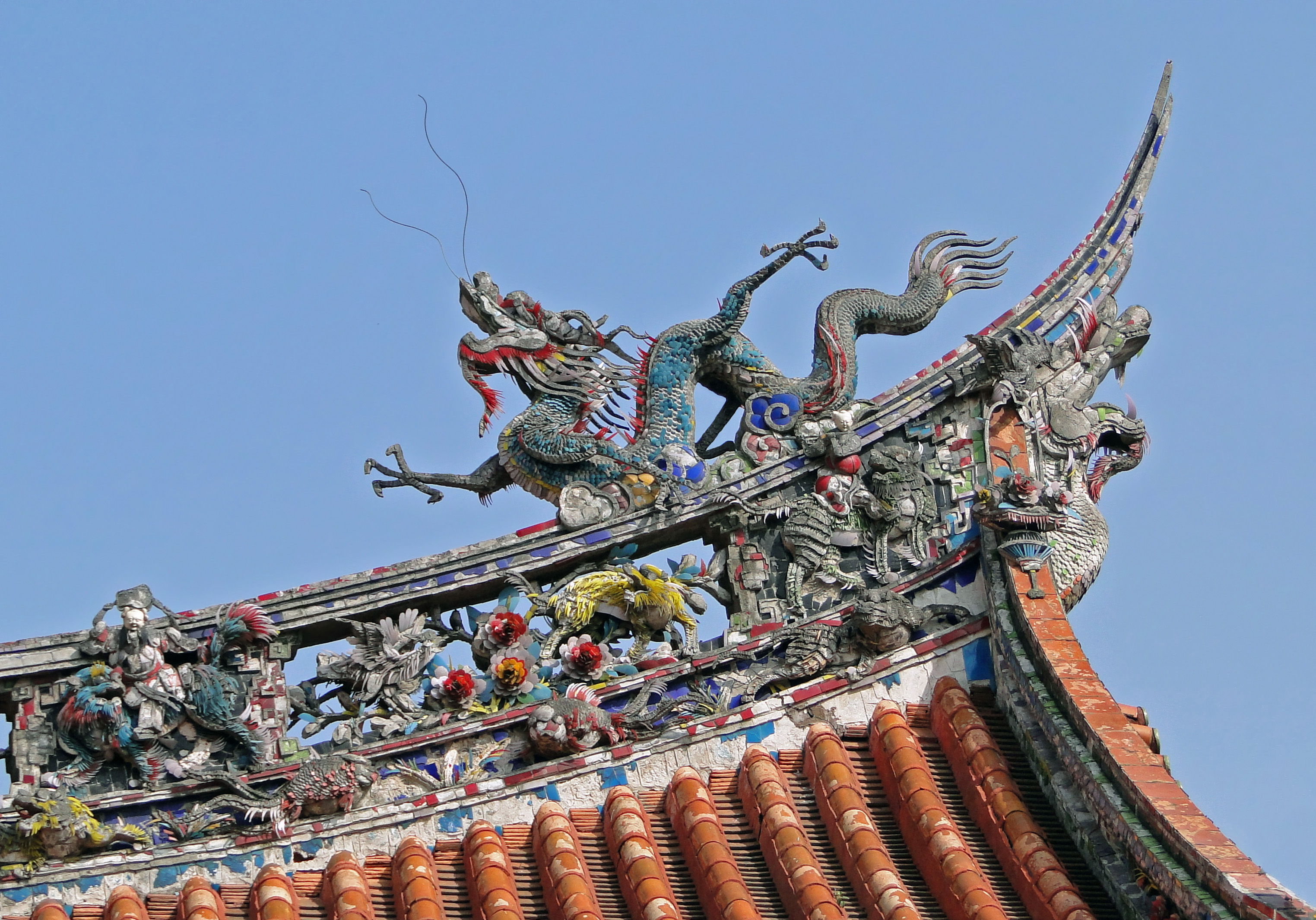
Longshan Temple at Taipei, Taiwan.

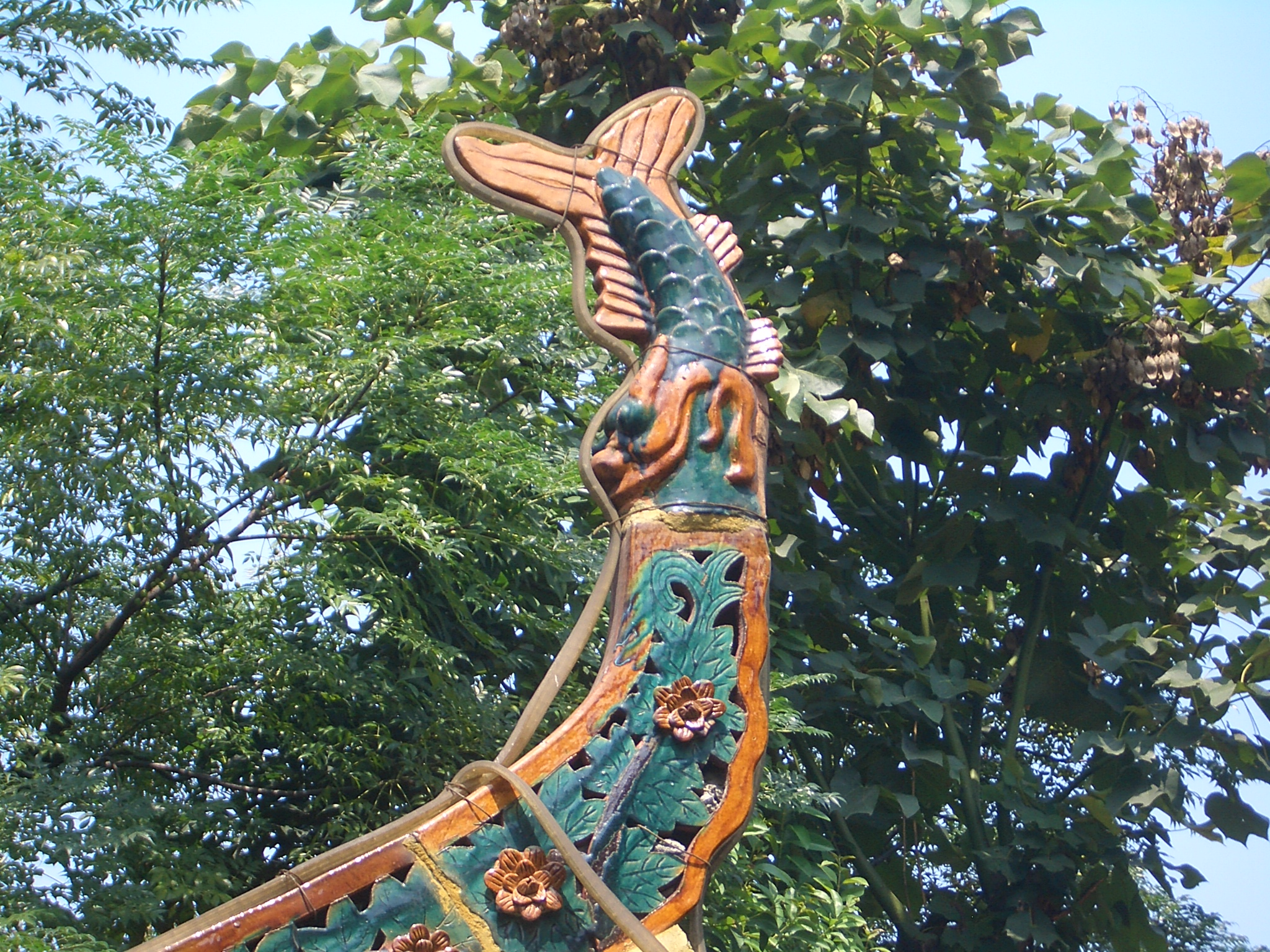
Changchun Temple, Wuhan.

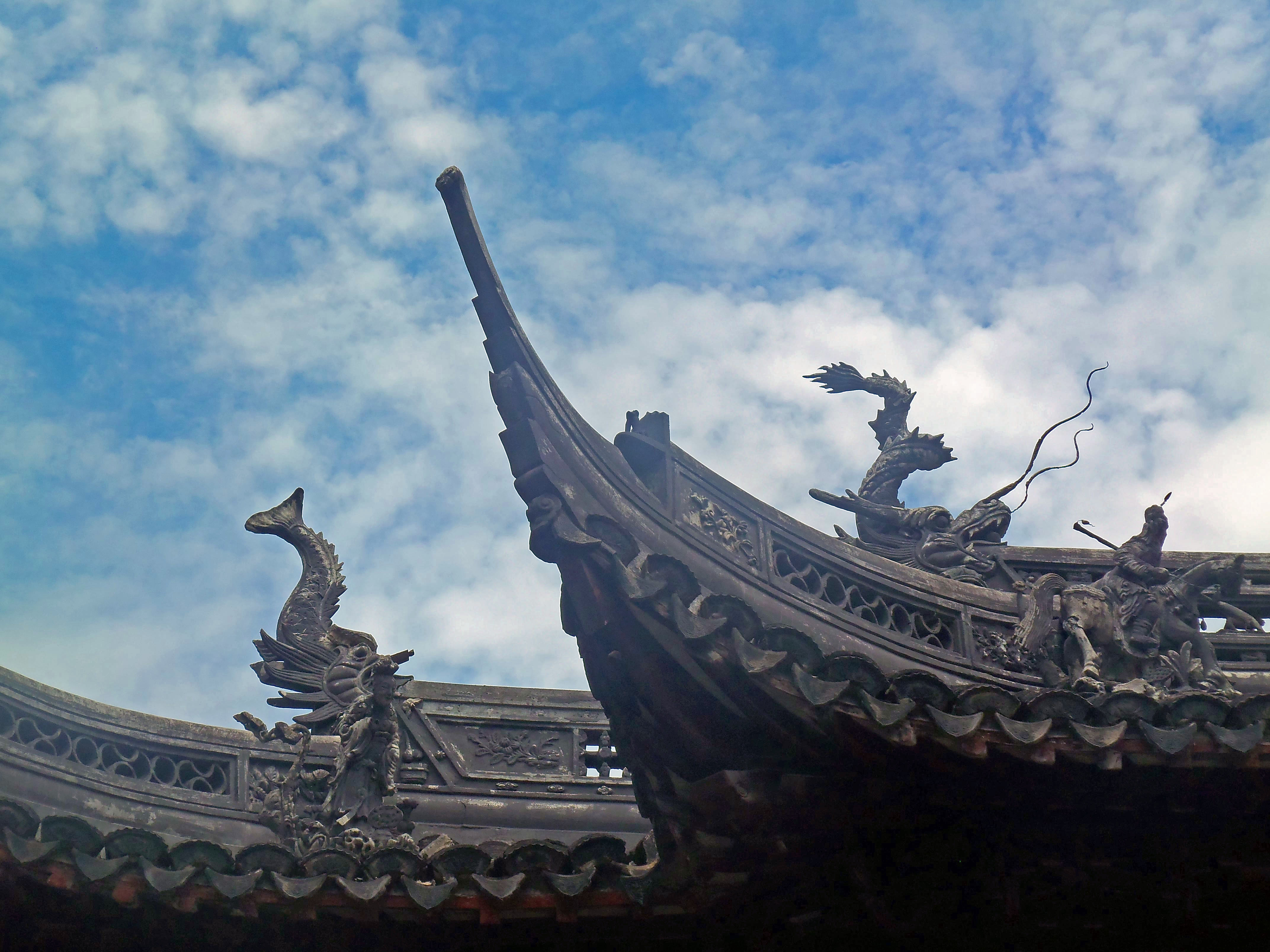
Fish and dragon shaped chiwen of Yuyuan Gardens.

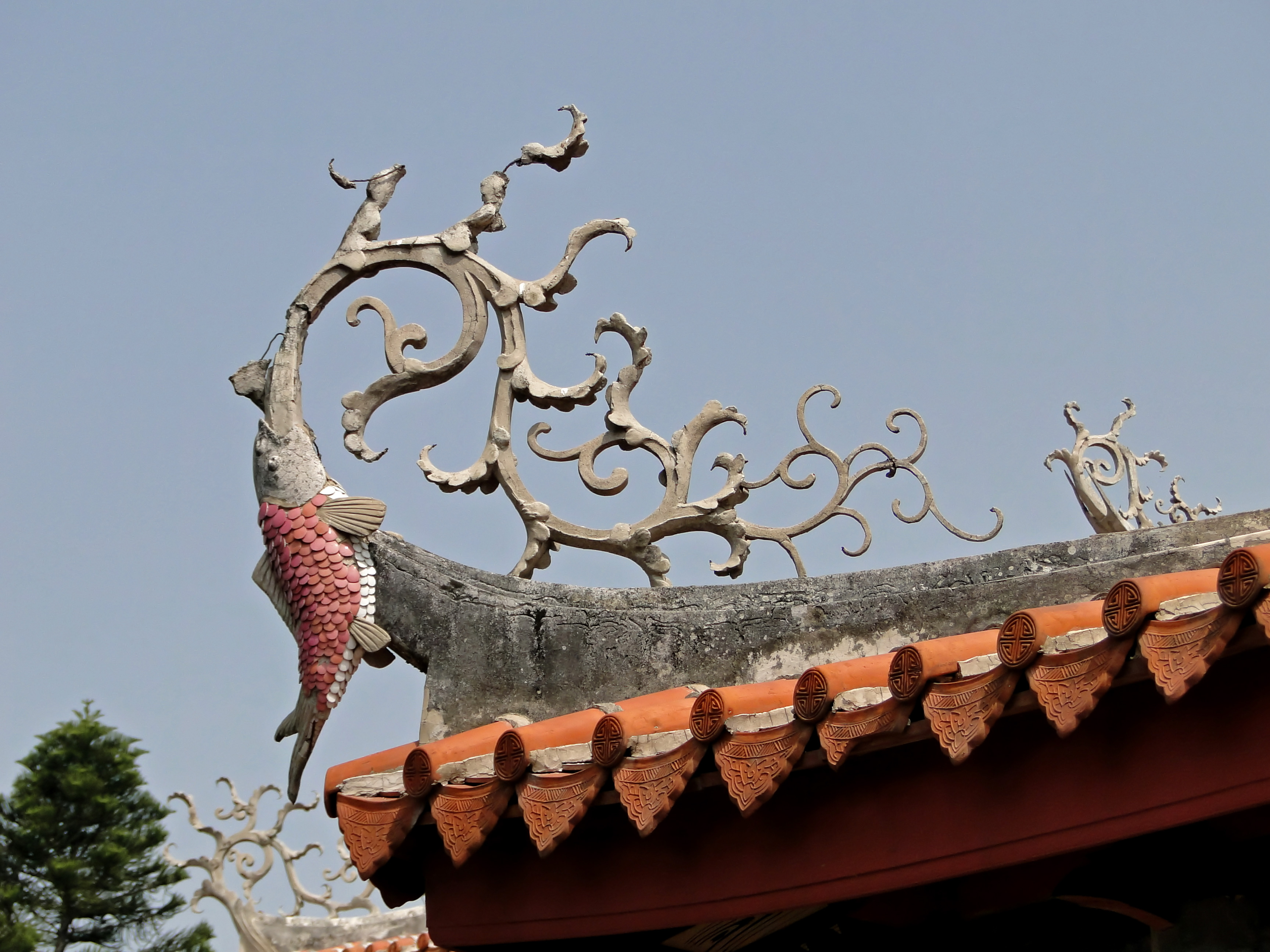
Fish and waves chiwen of Fort Provintia, Tainan

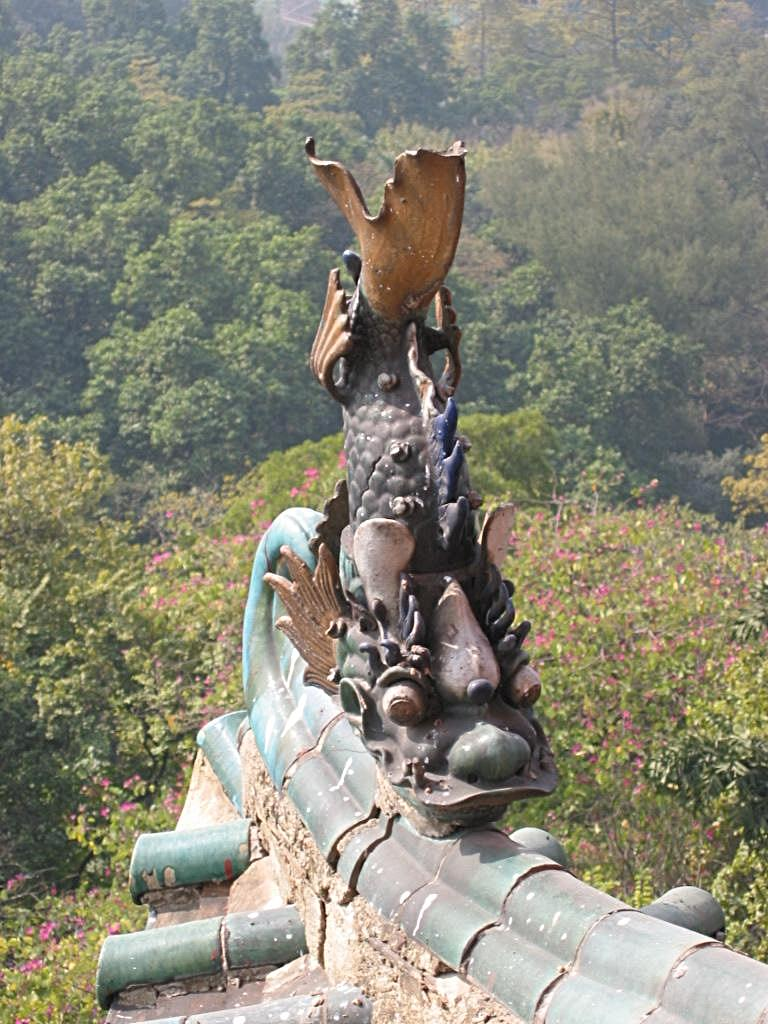
Chiwen in Guangzhou

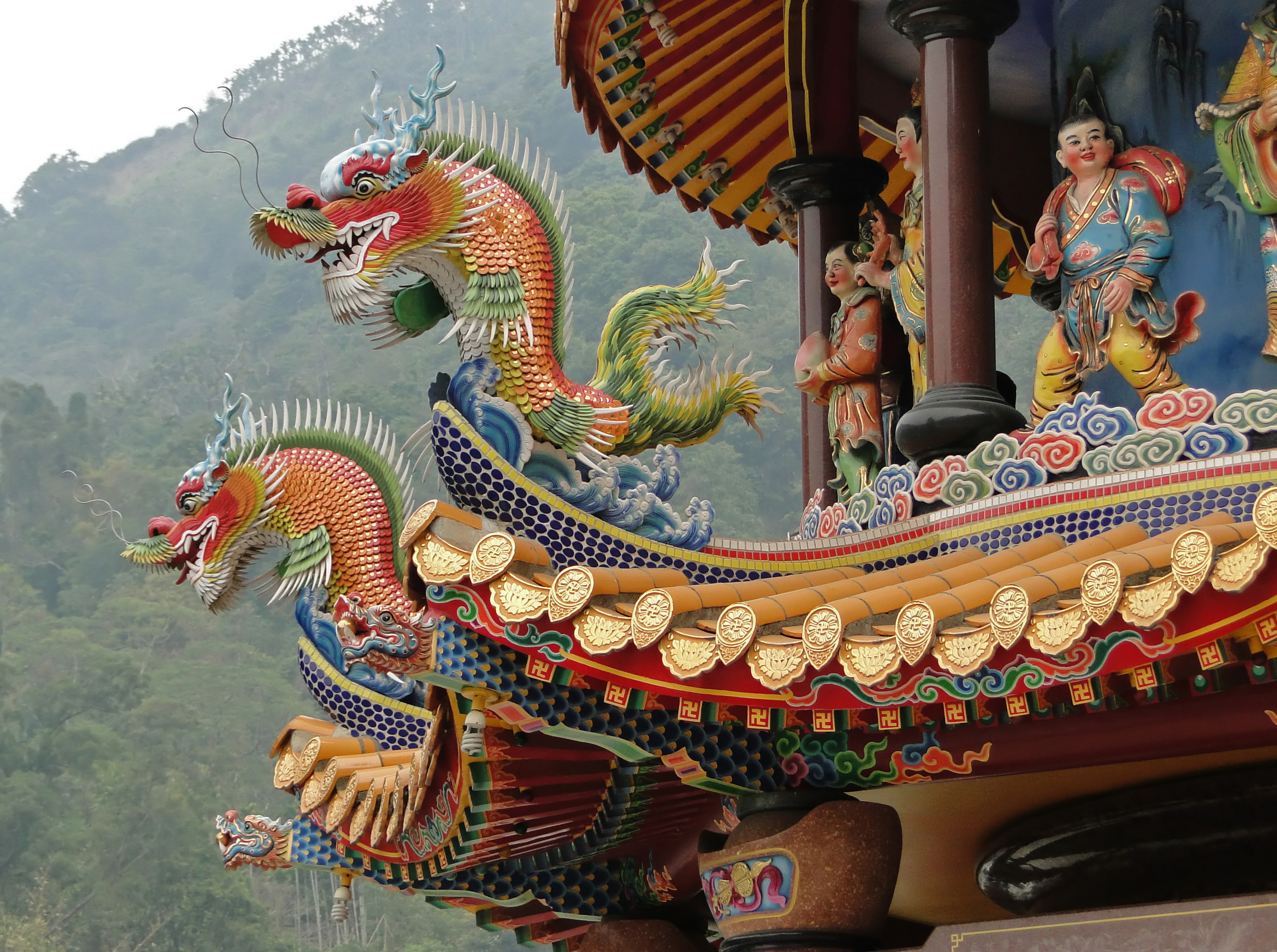
Chiwen on the roof of Longyin Temple, Chukou, Taiwan

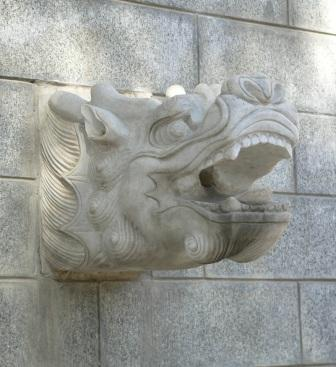
A chishou gargoyle

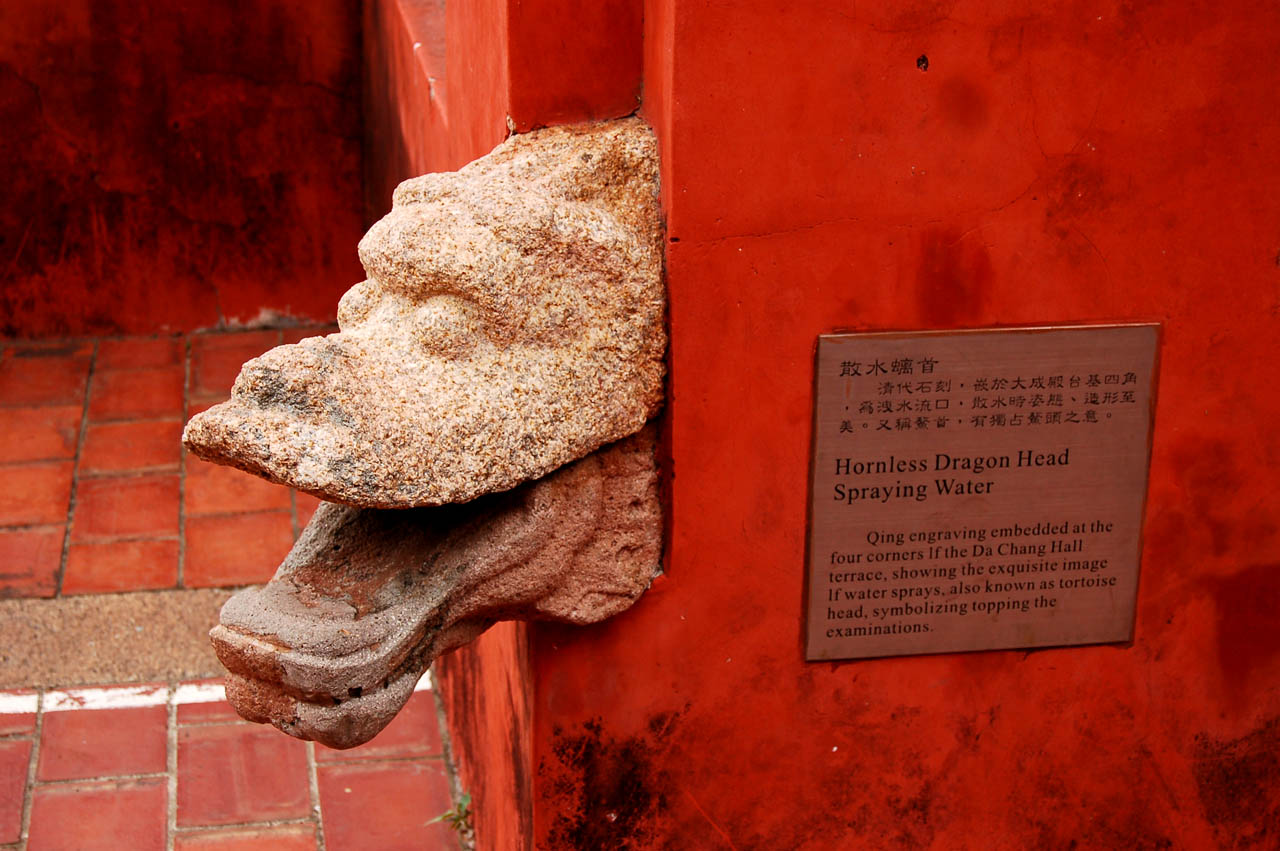
chishou at Taiwan Confucian Temple

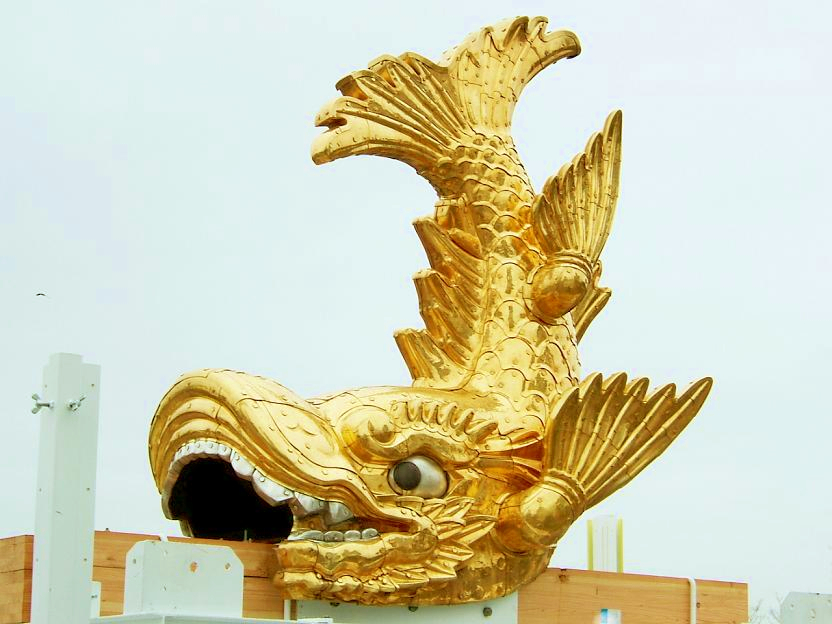
A golden shachihoko on the roof of Nagoya Castle

== See also ==
- Gargoyle
- Grotesque (architecture)
- Shibi (roof tile), Japanese variation of chiwei.
- Onigawara
- Shachihoko
