= Imperial roof decoration =

Chinese statuettes on official buildings

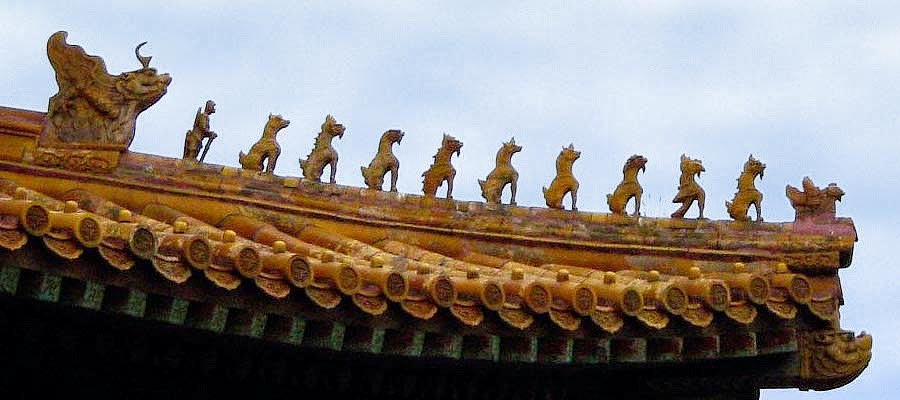
Highest possible status imperial roof decoration - man riding bird, nine beasts, immortal figure, and dragon

Chinese imperial roof decorations or roof charms or roof-figures (Chinese: 檐獸/檐兽; pinyin: yán shòu) or "walking beasts" (Chinese: 走獸/走兽; pinyin: zǒu shòu) or "crouching beasts" (Chinese: 蹲獸/蹲兽; pinyin: Dūn shòu) were statuettes placed along the ridge line of official buildings of the Chinese empire. Only official buildings (palaces, government buildings, and some temples) were permitted to use such roof decorations.

== Overview ==
Chinese roofs are typically of the hip roof type, with small gables, so decorations along the ridge line were highly visible to observers. Variant versions are still widespread in Chinese temples and has spread to the rest of East Asia and parts of Southeast Asia.

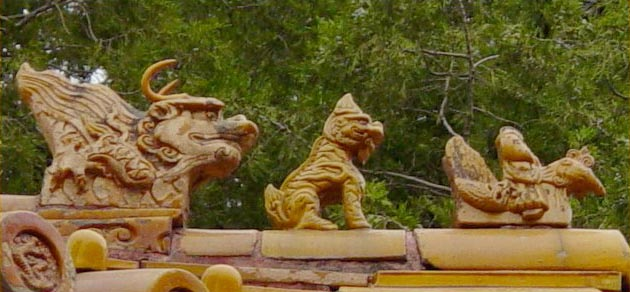
Imperial roof decoration of a minor building at the Forbidden City

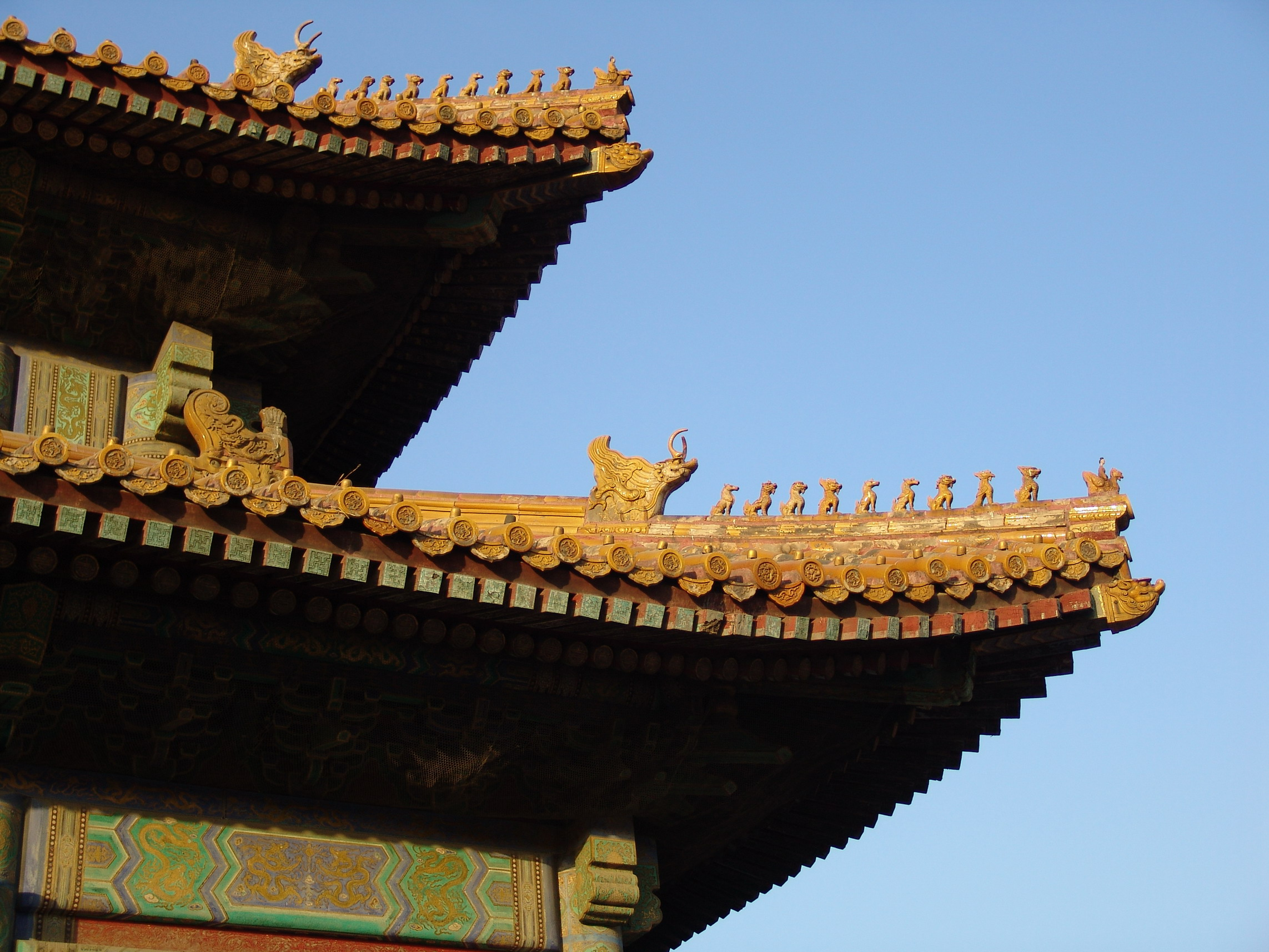
Multiple gables with decorations

Along the ridges (unions between the roof panels), near the corner, a row of small figures is placed. These are often made of glazed ceramic and form an outward marching procession. Here we see the imperial yellow glaze reserved for the emperor. At the tail of the procession will be an imperial dragon, representing the authority of the state. At the head of the procession will be a man riding a Phoenix, one legend suggests that this represents a minion of the emperor who grew greedy for power and was hanged from the roof gable for treason. Another version of this figurine is an immortal riding a fenghuang-bird or qilin. Yet another interpretation is that this is a person serving the emperor, being watched by the following beasts. In between will be mythical beasts, usually an odd number of them. The mythical beasts are set to pounce upon the man and devour him should he stray from performing his duties with faithfulness and rectitude.

In the illustration at the top there is only one beast; the number of beasts indicating the importance of the duties performed within the building or within the courtyard protected by a gate. The maximum number of beasts is nine, including evil-dispelling bull, courageous goat-bull (獬豸), wind- and storm-summoning fish (狎魚), mythical lion (狻猊), auspicious seahorse, heavenly horse, lion, and chiwen (鴟吻, a son of dragon). The maximum number is seen in the lower image, taken at the Hall of Supreme Harmony. Note the addition of an immortal guardian (行什, hangshi, "ranked tenth") in front of the dragon holding to a sword like a cane. During imperial times, this figure was unique to this single building, being the throne hall and therefore the building with the highest status in the entire empire.

These examples are found within the Forbidden City, Beijing, China. Other examples can be found on functional structures such as gates and barracks of the Great Wall of China, as well as the roofs of the Summer Palace outside of Beijing.

With the fall of the empire (in 1911 C.E.) such decorations are now seen on commercial structures and tourist boats.

== General references ==
- Yan, Haijun (5 July 2023). "A Cultural Study of The Roof Beast in Traditional Chinese Ancient Architecture". International Journal of Education and Humanities. 9 (2): 139–142. doi:10.54097/ijeh.v9i2.9884.

== See also ==
- Chiwen
- Gargoyle
- Grotesque (architecture)
- Onigawara
- Imperial guardian lion
- Shachihoko
