= Shibi (roof tile) =

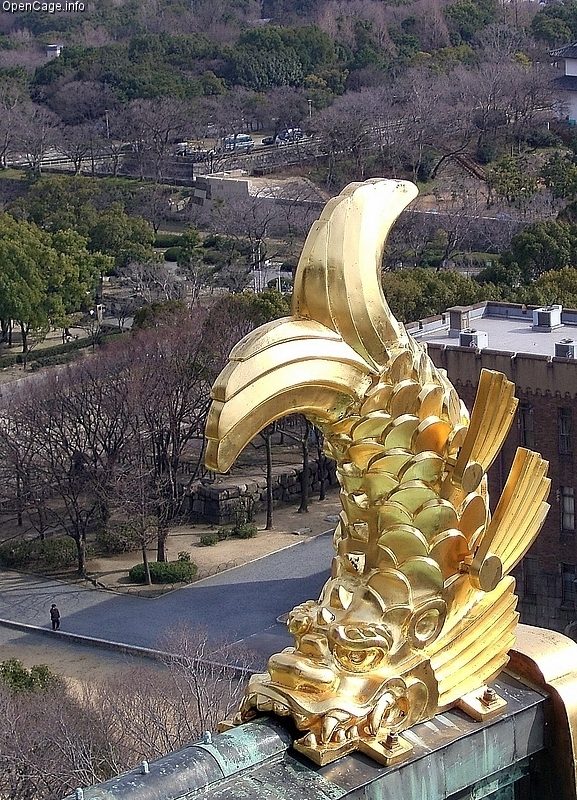
Shibi in the form of a shachihoko

Shibi (鴟尾, shibi) is a Chinese and Japanese ornamental tile set on both ends of the ridgepole that tops a shingled roof. The kanji for the word mean "kite" and "tail" respectively. Because it resembles a shoe, it is sometimes also called a kutsugata (沓形), meaning "shoe shape".

Shibi often take the form of a shachihoko.

== See also ==
- Shisa, ceramic lions on roofs or by gates
- Chinese roof charms, multiple different species
- Chiwen, origin of Shibi in China
