= Jidu Temple =

Religious site in Jiyuan, Henan province, China

Coordinates: 35.1092°N 112.5764°E

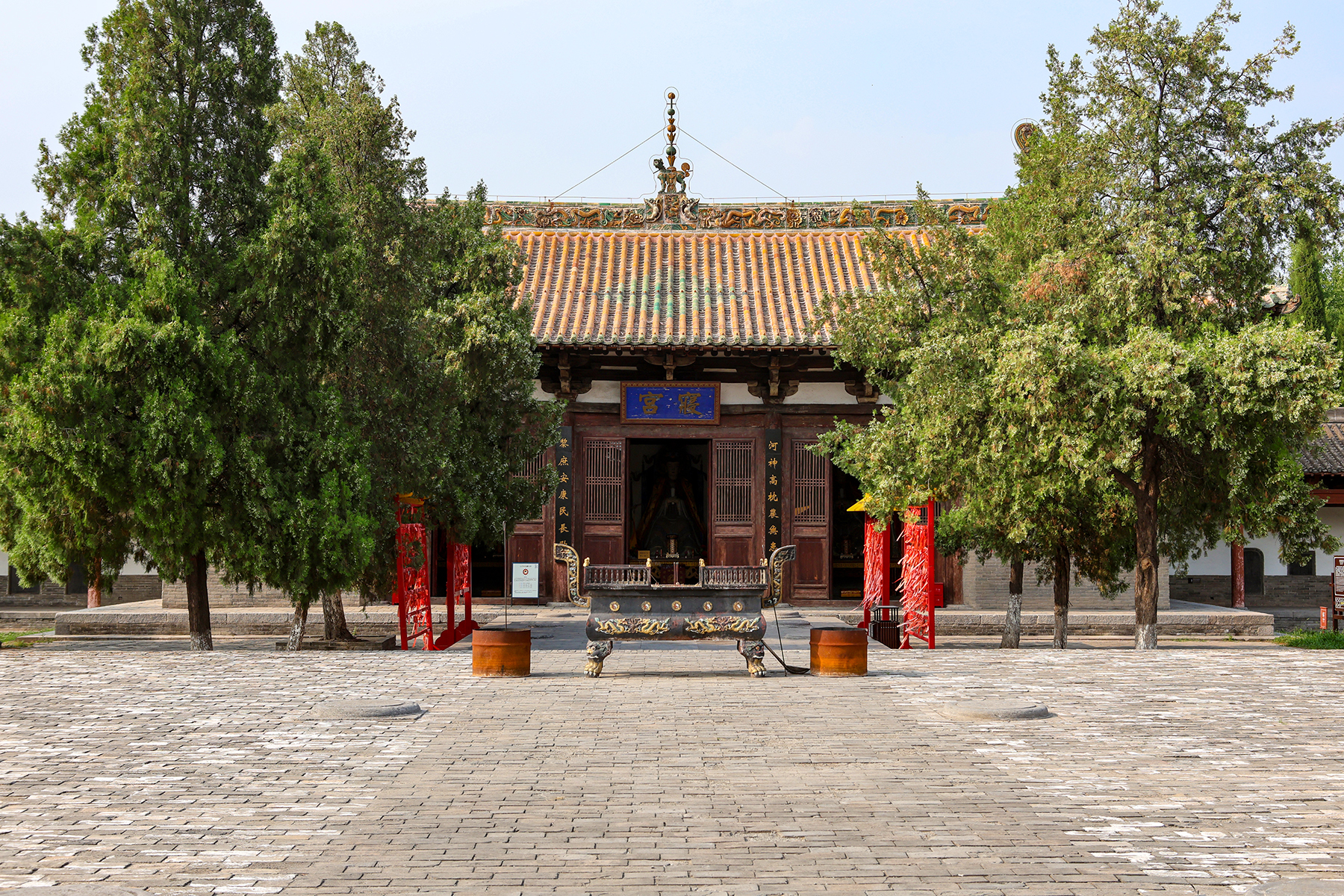

Jidu Temple (Chinese: 济渎庙) is located in Jiyuan, Henan province, China. It was a religious site built in 582 (the second year of the Kaihuang reign in the Sui dynasty), covering above 7 hundred square metres. There are four groups of building complexes. It is one of the greatest ancient building complexes existing in Henan province and Important Relic under National Protection.

== History ==
Jidu Temple was built for sacrificing for the Immortal of Ji River one of the four Immortals of "Sidu". In ancient times, people prayed to the Immortals so as to enjoy good weather for crops and a big harvest next year. As a result, sacrifice is very important. Since the Sui dynasty, the emperors of successive dynasties have sent envoys to Jidu Temple. The fiesta lasted until the Qing dynasty.

== Landscape ==
Jidu Temple rides north to south, the overall layout looks like a Chinese character 甲, the main building complexes locate on three longitudinal axes. With tall ancient cypress trees reaching towards the sky and green river surrounded, the temple is not only a famous scenic spot of ancient sacrifice but also a typical northern classical garden.
