= Shachihoko =

Japanese mythological creature

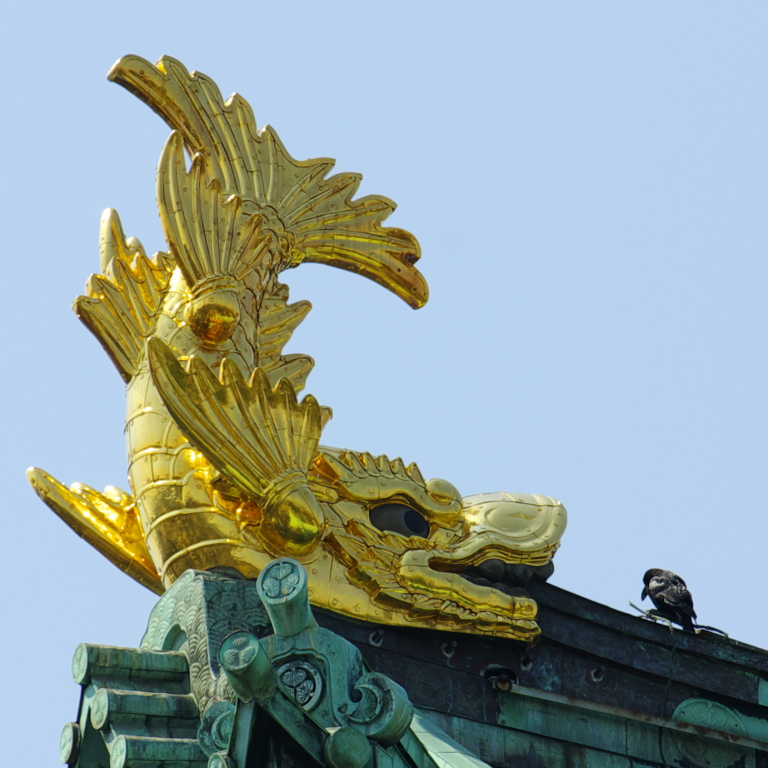
Shachihoko on the roof of Nagoya Castle

A Shachihoko (鯱・鯱鉾) – or simply Shachi (鯱) – is a sea monster in Japanese folklore with the head of a dragon or tiger and the body of a carp covered entirely in black or grey scales. According to the tale, Shachihoko lives in the cold northern ocean. Its broad fins and tail always point up toward heaven, and its dorsal fins have numerous sharp spikes. It can swallow a massive amount of water and hold it in its belly, as well as summon clouds and control the rain. Although believed to come from the sea, they are often constructed high on the roof standing upside down.

鯱 is a kokuji character; when pronounced shachi (鯱), it can mean "orca".

== Origins ==
Shachihoko evolved from Chiwen, an animal in the Chinese tale from the Han dynasty (202 BC - 220 AD), and is known as Shibi in Japan. First found in the Eastern Han dynasty portrait brick “Visitation”, Chiwen appears as a component that covers the roof ridge and protects the building from fire. The animal was popularized in Japan during the Nara (710 AD - 794 AD) and Heian period (794 AD - 1185), and became a widely used element of Japanese roof construction during the Sengoku period (1467–1651).

Other descriptions propose that Shachihoko probably derived from the ancient Vedic sea creature in Hindu mythology, known as Makara, a Sanskrit term for sea monster. It is a powerful protector and servant of various deities that appears in half-fish and half-beast, often depicted with a dragon emerging from its mouth and characterized by an elongated nose that resembles an elephant. In Southeast Asia, Makara is frequently used to adorn temple lintels and arches or as rain spouts.

== Functions ==
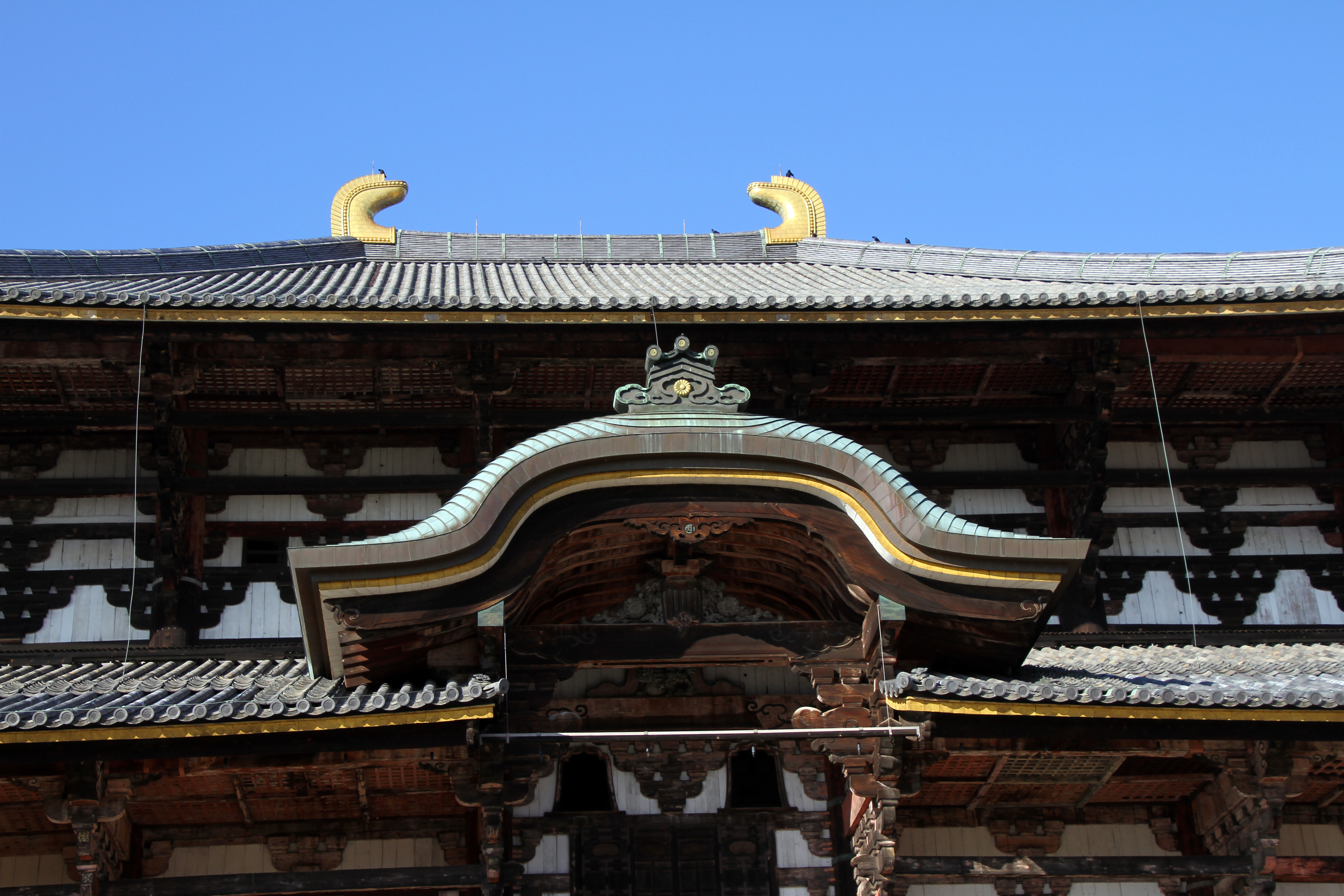
Shachihoko on Tōdaiji Kondō (Nara)

Since most ancient architecture is made of wood, they are often under the threat of fire. Shachihoko, believed to have the ability to store water and control the rain, are often constructed in a male and female pair at each end of the roof ridge as protector spirits of the castles. Although the exact technique is unknown, it is said that its grotesque appearance and particularly the spouting hole might send out water to quench fire. Meanwhile, despite usually having similar styling, Shachihoko could vary in scale, which potentially makes it an important symbol for reflecting the grade of ancient buildings and proving the wealth of the constructor. It is thus believed that when Shachihoko is first used on roofs in the Muromachi period (1333–1573), it serves as a representation of the feudal lord's authority.

The most famous Shachihoko today is the kin shachi (golden dolphins) at Nagoya castle, which are plated in 18 karat gold, 0.15 millimetres thick. The male is 2.62 meters high, weighs 1,272 kilograms, and has 112 scales, while the female is 2.58 meters high, weighs 1,215 kilograms, and has 126 scales. However, with more realistic and modern approaches to fire protection, most Shachihoko now retains only an ornamental function as roof decoration. Because of its uncanny gesture, Shachihoko is used as a synonym for "standing upside down on the head, and the term "shachihoko-baru (鯱張る: to be stiffly dignified)" is also derived from its name.

== In popular culture ==
- The mascot for the 2026 Asian Games, Honohon, represents a shachihoko.
  - Same as Uzumin, mascot for the same year's Asian Para Games.
- Kinshachi appears as a playable character in Kemono Friends 3.
- The Rainmaker (In japanese: Gachi hoko), a weapon unique to a game mode of the same name in the Splatoon series, is based directly on the shachihoko.
  - In the first installment, its ability to control rain is represented with the weapon firing tornadoes of ink.

== See also ==
- Gargoyle
- Grotesque (architecture)
- Makara (Hindu mythology)
- Onigawara
- Shibi (roof tile)
- Team Shachi (originally Team Syachihoko), a J-pop idol group which formerly used the animal in its name and logo
