= Angama =

Angama may refer to:

== Culture ==
- Angama (dance), a traditional dance in the Yaeyama Islands of Japan

== Places ==
- Angama River, a river of the Republic of the Congo
- Angama, Niari, Republic of the Congo
- Angara, Plateaux, Republic of the Congo
- Angama, Democratic Republic of the Congo
- Angama, Chad, a sandy hilly area of Chad
