= Ryukyuan architecture =

History of Ryukyuans traditional architecture

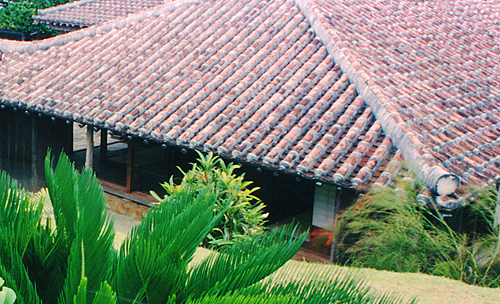
Red tile on the traditional Okinawan house

Ryukyuan architecture is Ryukyuans' traditional architecture. The history of Ryukyuan architecture dates back to the Shell Mound Period that lasted between 2000–1000 BC. During this period, houses in Okinawa were principally pit dwellings. Constructors dug houses into the red earth or encircled them by walls made of limestone material. Hearths never featured in either of the two forms of pit-dwellings. During the late quarter of the Shell Mound Period, people started building structures that pillars supported. To build the new buildings, people started using the black muddy soil found in the area to produce tiles. The first step involved mixing the mud with water and drying it for forty days. The second step involved baking the dried mud mixture, processing it into the iconic red roof tiles which is one of the most significant features of Okinawan architecture. The red roofs were a preserve of aristocrats because commoners used to live in grass-thatched houses. In 1889, however, the Shuri government abolished the exclusive use of red tiles among the aristocrats and commoners started using the design on their houses. Since then, red tiles are a common feature on houses in Okinawa.

In addition to the houses with red roofs, Ryukyuan architecture also consists of castles or fortresses, which are prominent in the Ryukyu Islands. The primary feature of these structures is their stone walls. The structures, commonly referred to as gusuku, also have one or multiple baileys, depending on their size. An additional feature is the presence of gates guarding entrances. At the heart of these buildings is a main hall, often referred to as seidan, which is reserved as the residence of the feudal lord. Moreover, almost all the gusuku structures contain shrines that occupants use to perform religious rites. The Shuri Castle is an example of a gusuku structure.

== Appearance ==
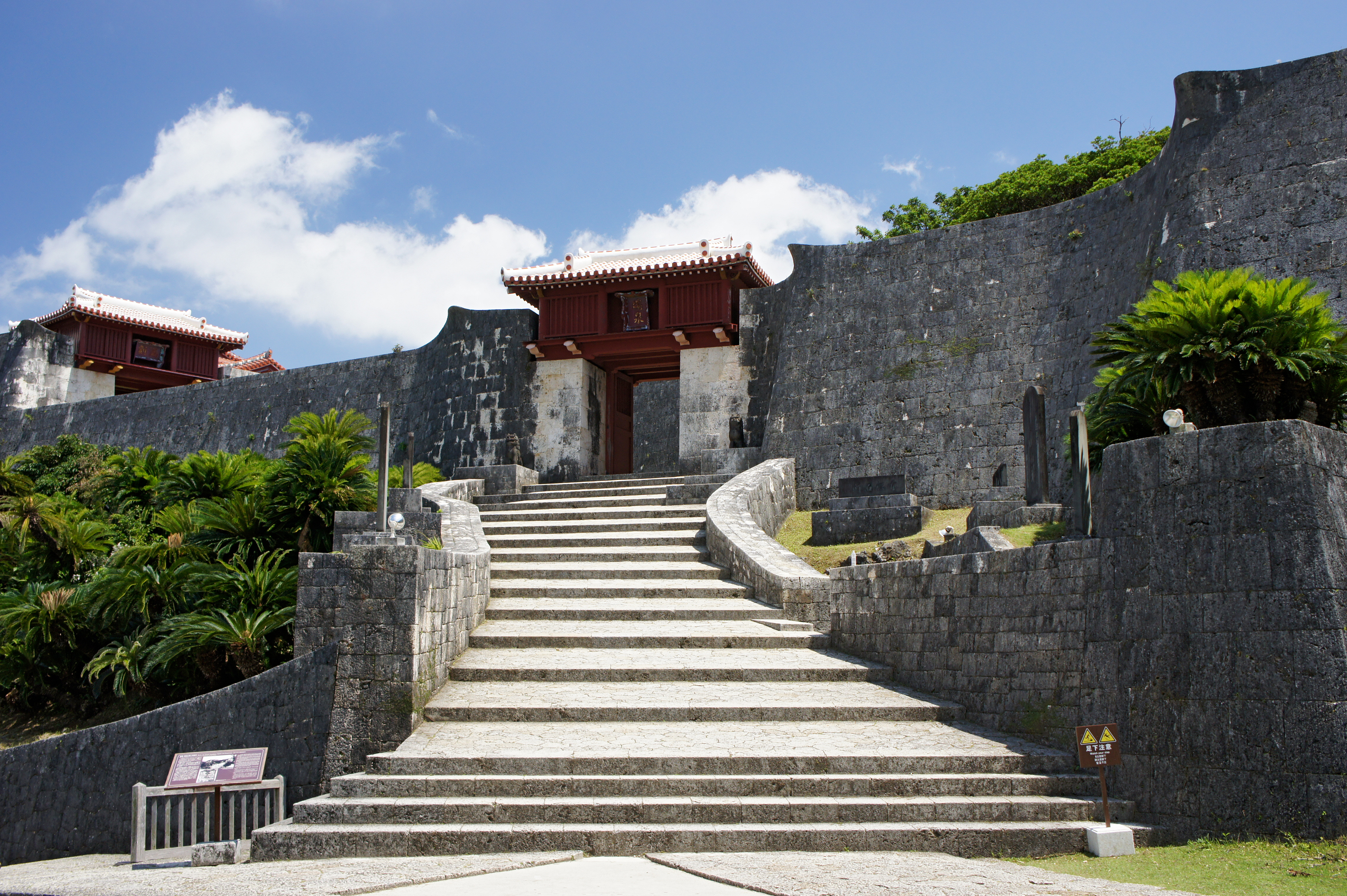
Walls of Shuri Castle in Shuri, Okinawa

The extensive use of stonework characterizes Ryukyuan architecture. It is similar with Japan’s stacking style, but it is different in the use of white limestone. Accordingly, Okinawan houses are different from the houses found in mainland Japan in terms of aesthetics rather than style. In fact, Okinawan houses are made of three different styles of stonework: aikata-zumi, nozura-zumi, and nuno-zumi. Aikata-zumi involves curving of stones in a uniform manner to make shapes such pentagons and hexagons. The uniformity of the stones makes it possible to remove one stone and the rest to hold up without weakening the structure. Nozura-zumi involves stacking stones of different sizes and shapes to form a wall without paying attention to aesthetics.

== Functions ==
Buildings in Ryukyu Islands served multiple functions including protecting occupants and hosting people. Primarily, walls made of white limestone surround the houses, which serves the purpose of ensuring the privacy of the occupants. Sections of the wall remain open to ensure easy access and allow passage of breeze. Even so, the entrance opening is not wide open but is blocked by a wall section commonly referred to as hinpun, which serves the function of protecting occupants from evil spirits.

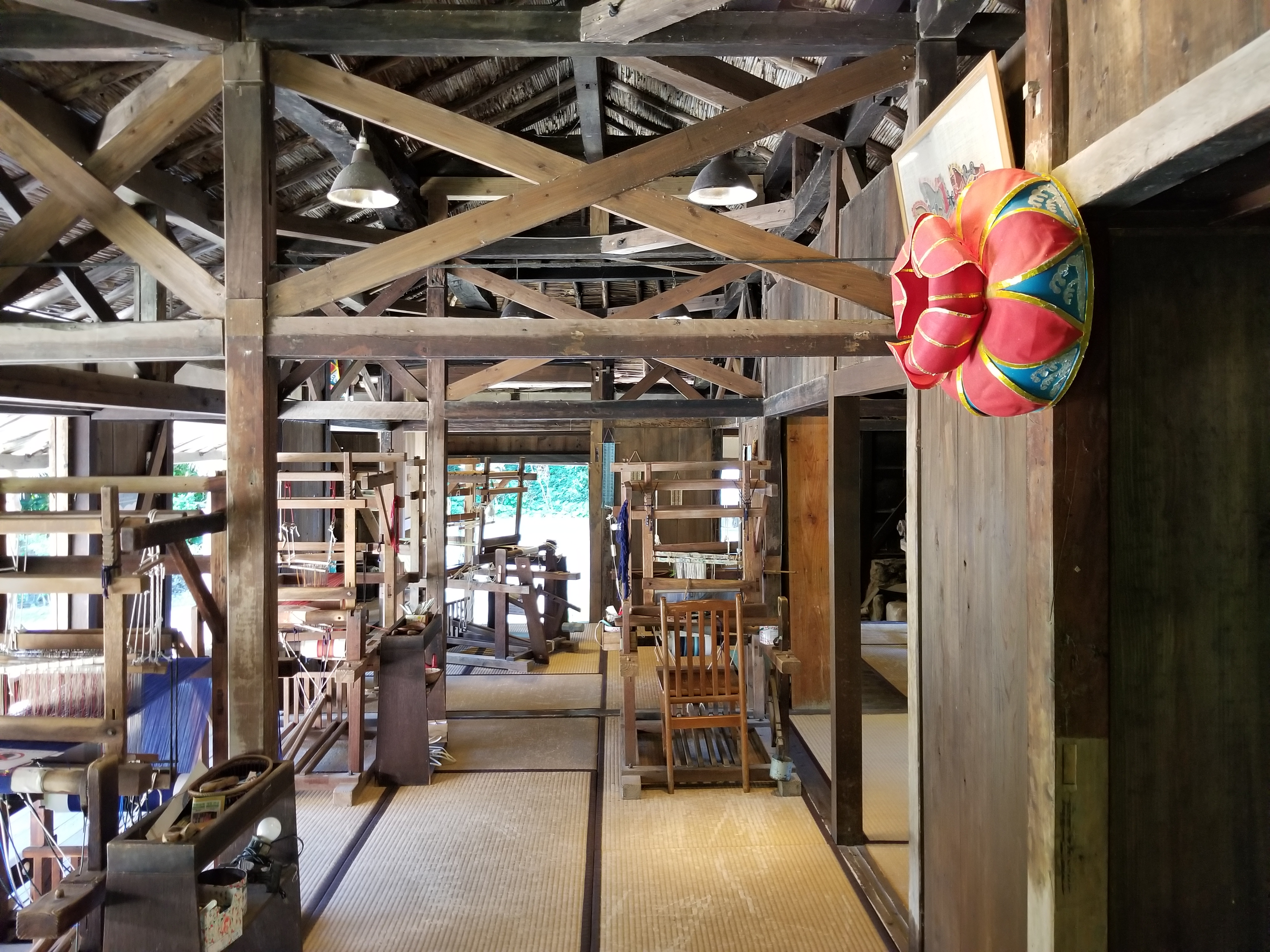
Interior of the former Nakasone family residence, originally built in 1808 in Yomitan village and now located in Ryukyu Mura

In addition to protection, the houses consist of numerous rooms that accommodate people. A typical house consists of between four and five rooms plus a kitchen. There are two rooms located at the front that serve to entertain visitors. These rooms are commonly referred to as (ichibanza) and (nibanza to represent the first and second rooms respectively.

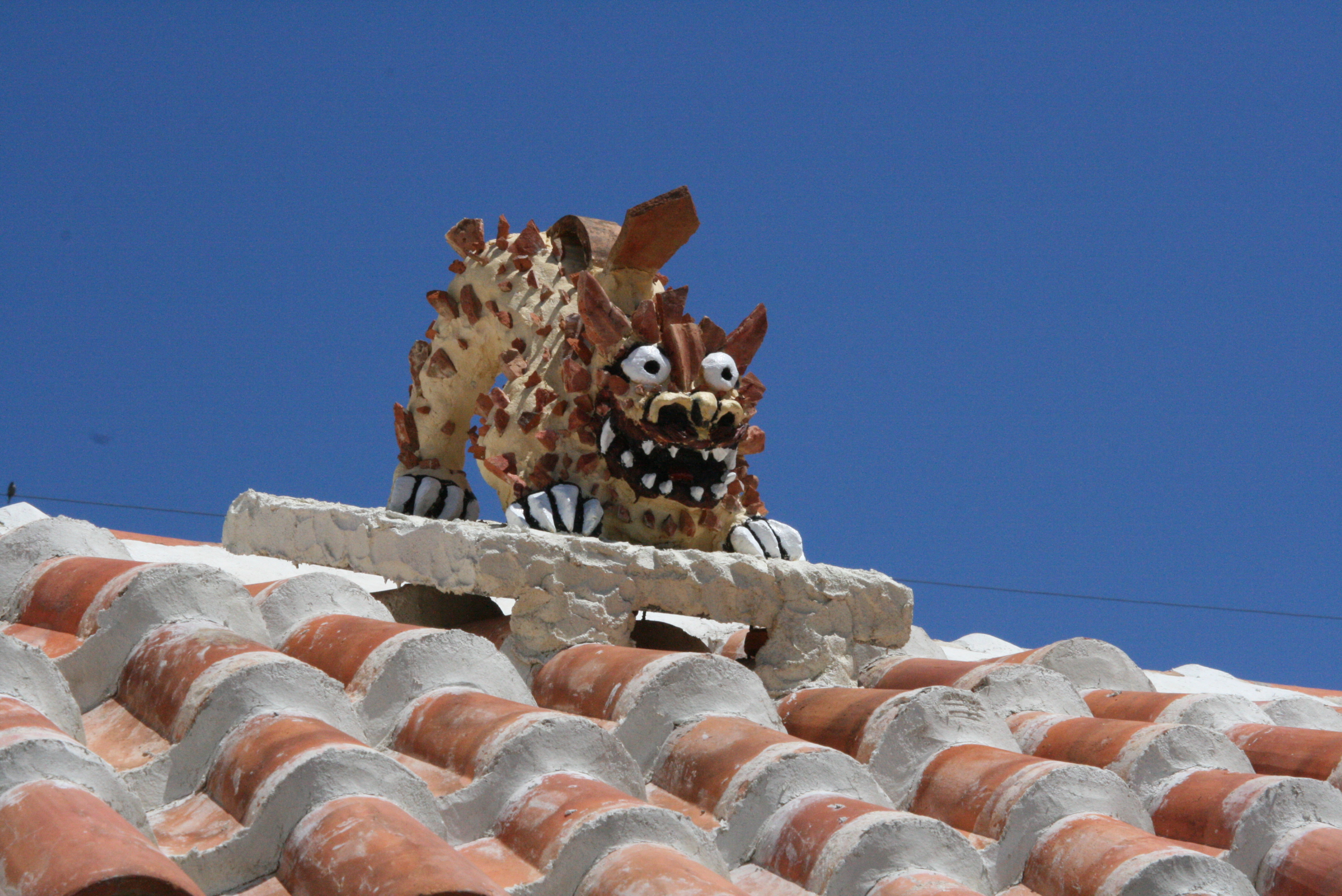
Shisa in Nago, Okinawa Prefecture

Beyond protection and hosting people, buildings in Ryukyu served the function of reflecting the experiences and cultures of the local people, which can be passed from one generation to another. Even though architecture creates, there is the influence of the surrounding environment including people’s culture, geography and climate. Okinawa is a beautiful location and its architecture reflects its history and fascinating interaction with surrounding regions. For instance, Shuri Castle is blend of Chinese and Japanese architecture. The structure fits the region’s climate while also preserving the history between Japan and China. Another example is the Nakamura Family Residence, which is a reflection of the cultural traditions of both Chinese and Japanese people. To demonstrate the function of protection, the house has a strategic stone entry that protects the building from evil spirits. Also, there is a traditional shisa lion sitting on the red tile roof of the building to signal protection from unwanted spirits. The red tile roof was a common feature of the Okinawan architecture and it demonstrated the ability of the local people to build structures that could withstand regular typhoons and show the region’s years of adaptation and traditions.

== Maintenance ==
Ryukyu Islands is the windiest part of Japan, which makes it easy for the tiles to fall off, which require constant repairs. For the most part, the residents of the area prefer abandoning the homes for new grounds where they start building new homes.

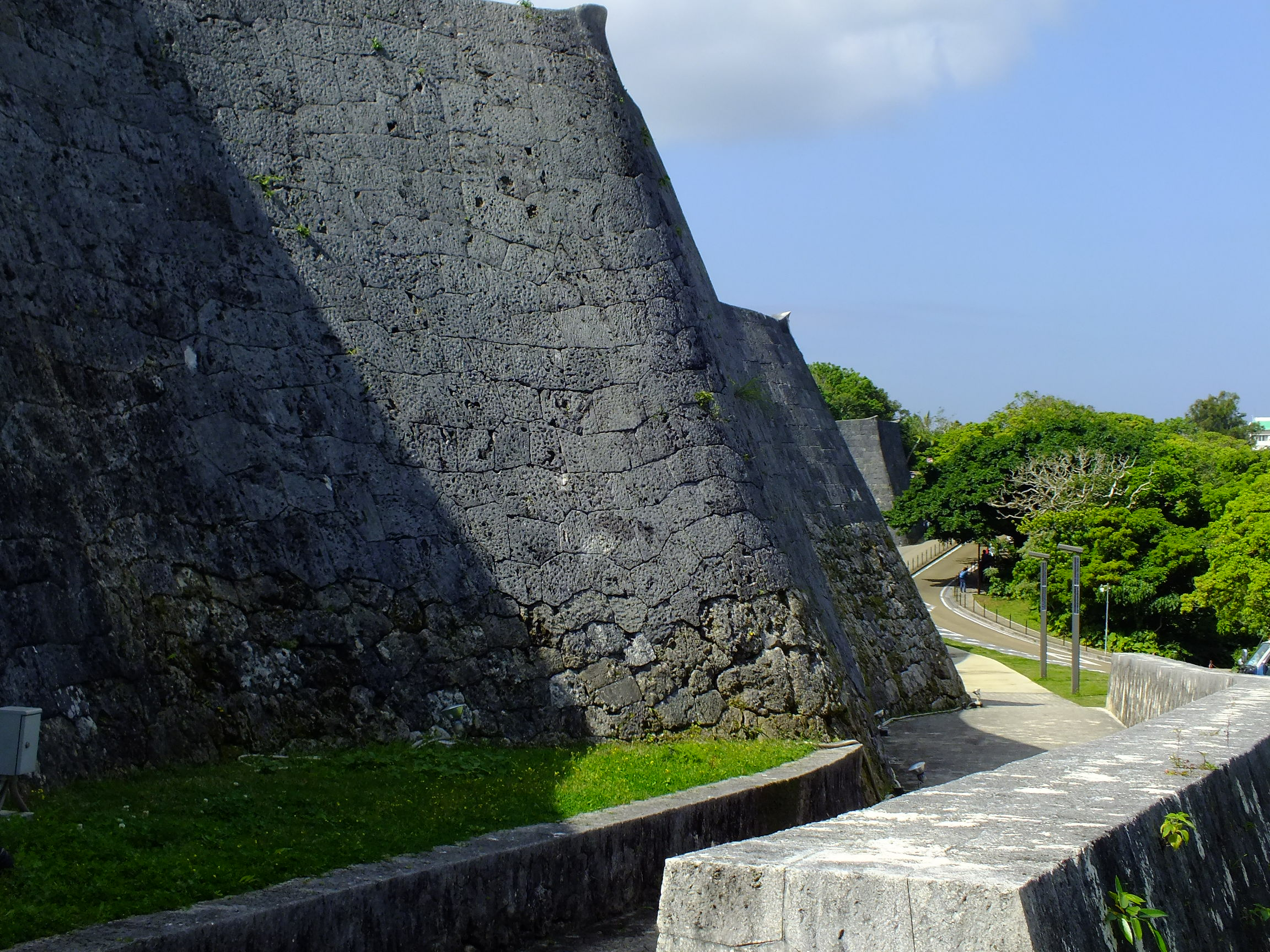
A restored wall near Kyukeimon, showing incorporated original stones

Reconstruction is also a common element of maintenance in Ryukyuan architecture, especially for famous buildings with cultural value. The Shuri Castle is a famous Ryukyuan architecture building that has been reconstructed numerous times after being ruined during war and conflict. The building experienced significant ruin during the Battle of Okinawa, which lasted from March to June in 1945, because it was used by the Japanese army as a bunker. Over the period of the conflict, only little remains of the castle were left by the end of the conflict. Only the land surface and castle’s underground foundations remained. The Japanese government later designated the remains of the site as a historical site. Between 1989 and 1992, however, the Ministry of Construction and the Okinawa Development Agency started reconstructing the castle.

== Example of building ==
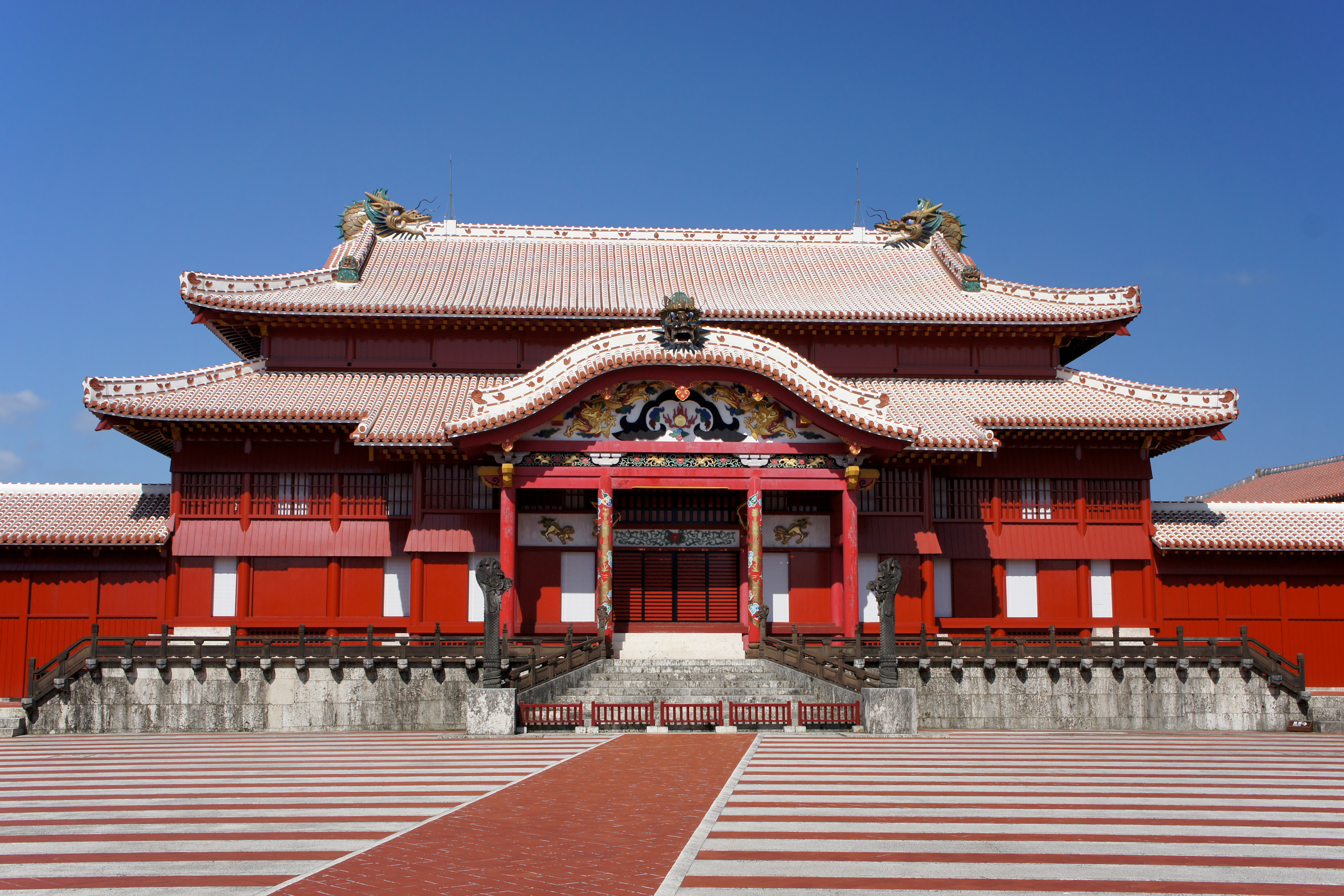
Shuri Castle main building

Arguably, Shuri Castle is the most famous building in the history of the Ryukyuan architecture because of its cultural heritage and persistence since the late 1300s. Perched on a hilltop, Shuri Castle is a diplomatic, cultural and political symbol in Okinawa because it served as Kingdom’s headquarter for more than 400 years. As such, the castle is the best place from where visitors to Okinawa can start to learn about the unique culture of the place. A first look at the façade provides visitors with a first look at Okinawa’s culture, which is distinct from the rest of Japan. The unique aspect of the building is its hybrid architecture that blends ideas from Japan, China and Southeast Asia. In fact, the blending of the different architectural ideas originates from the extensive trade that took place in Okinawa.

Ryukyuans identify with the Shuri Castle because it communicates their rich intangible cultural heritage. The reconstruction of the castle is one point in case. Historically, the Shuri Castle has been destroyed multiple times. In fact, its destruction during the Battle of Okinawa was the most devastating in its history because it led to complete destruction. No structure was spared and only the space that it once occupied remained by the end of the conflict. Because of its cultural value, however, the government and Ryukyuans community worked together to reconstruct the structure to its original form and it was reopened to the public in 1992. Since its opening, the building has been conserved as a cultural heritage that Ryukyuans enjoy along with visitors who visit the area as tourists. At the moment, Ryukyuan associate the structure with their experiences. For instance, the reconstruction of the castle presented Ryukyuans with the opportunity to reflect on their past values and narrate afresh their experiences for future generations. Restoring the building to its past form demonstrates the interest of Ryukyuans to preserve their heritage.
