= Ryukyu Mura =

Theme park in Onna, Okinawa, Japan

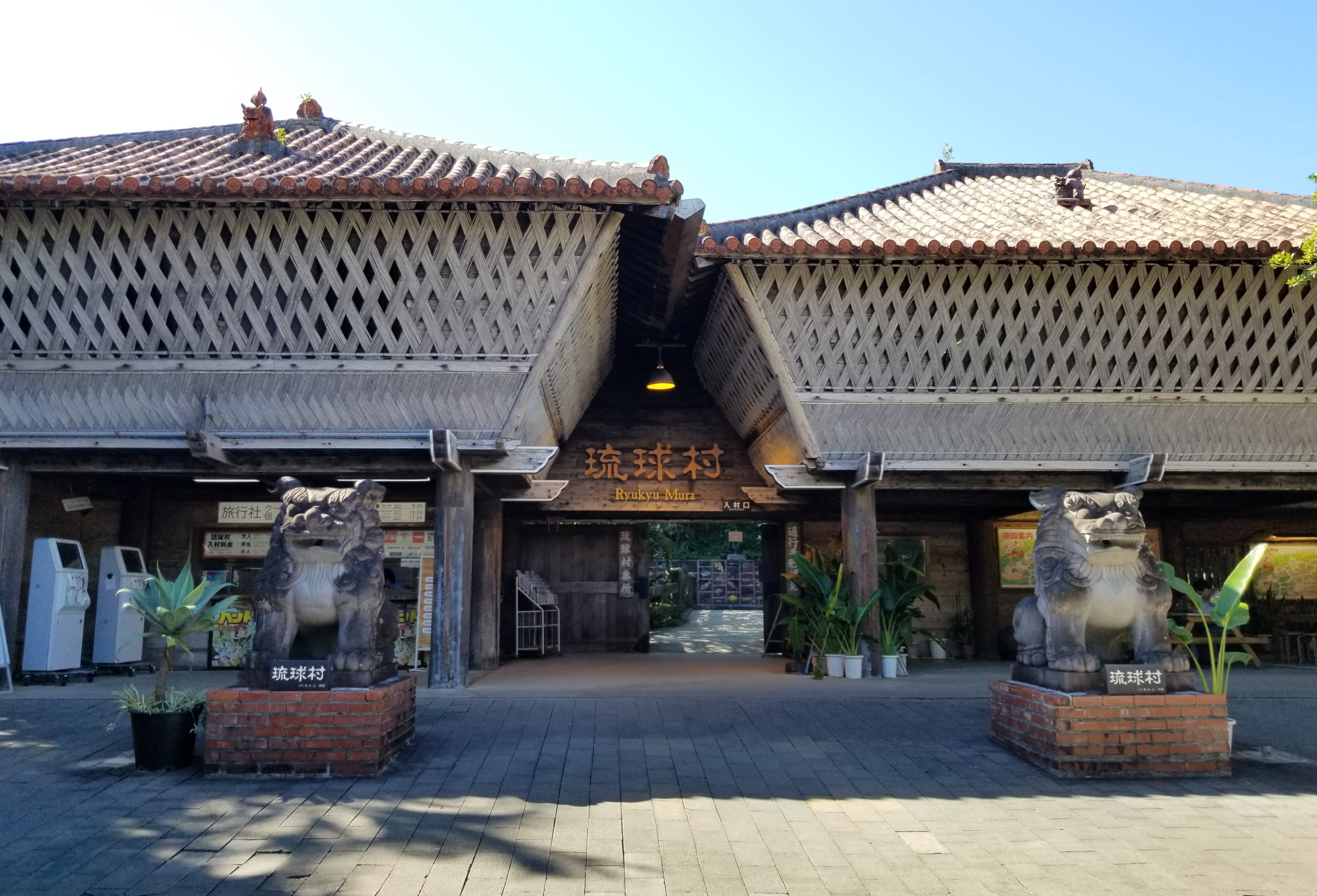
- Entrance to Ryukyu Mura
- Interactive map of Ryukyu Mura
- Location: 1130 Yamada, Onna, Kunigami District, Okinawa Prefecture 904-0416
- Coordinates: 26°25′46″N 127°46′31″E
- Status: Operating
- Public transit: No. 120 bus
- Opened: October 23, 1982
- Operated by: Takoyama Co., Ltd.
- Theme: Ryukyuan culture and history
- Website: www.ryukyumura.co.jp

Ryukyu Mura (Japanese: 琉球村, Hepburn: Ryūkyū Mura; lit. 'Ryukyu Village') is a theme park and folk museum in Onna, Okinawa Prefecture, Japan. It is an open-air museum featuring ten traditional Ryukyuan residences brought over from different parts of the prefecture, seven of which are Nationally Registered Tangible Cultural Properties. It is also a living museum where visitors may partake in Ryukyuan cultural activities led by staff, who are dressed in traditional Ryukyuan attire.

== Attractions and activities ==
Ryukyu Mura is a reconstructed village containing ten traditional Ryukyuan residences, which were disassembled for transportation and reassembled at the park before it opened on October 23, 1982. The residences range in age from several decades to over two centuries, with the former Nakasone family home, built in 1808, being the oldest. As such, the Japanese government recognizes seven of them as Nationally Registered Tangible Cultural Properties.

The staff at Ryukyu Mura dress in traditional Ryukyuan attire and lead traditional activities that visitors may partake in, such as crafting pottery, weaving cloth, grinding sugarcane, and painting small shisa statues. The park also hosts regular musical performances, showcasing taiko eisa dances, Okinawan folk songs, and sanshin music.

Visitors may rent traditional Ryukyuan clothing before entering the park. The catering area offers traditional Ryukyuan cuisine.

== Transportation ==
Ryukyu Mura is located in Onna village, in the central part of Okinawa Island, about 30 kilometres (19 mi) north of the prefectural capital Naha. It is a roughly 50-minute drive from Naha via the Naha–Ishikawa expressway, or an 80-minute bus ride on the No. 120 bus from the Naha Bus Terminal (90 minutes from the terminus station at Naha Airport).

== Gallery ==
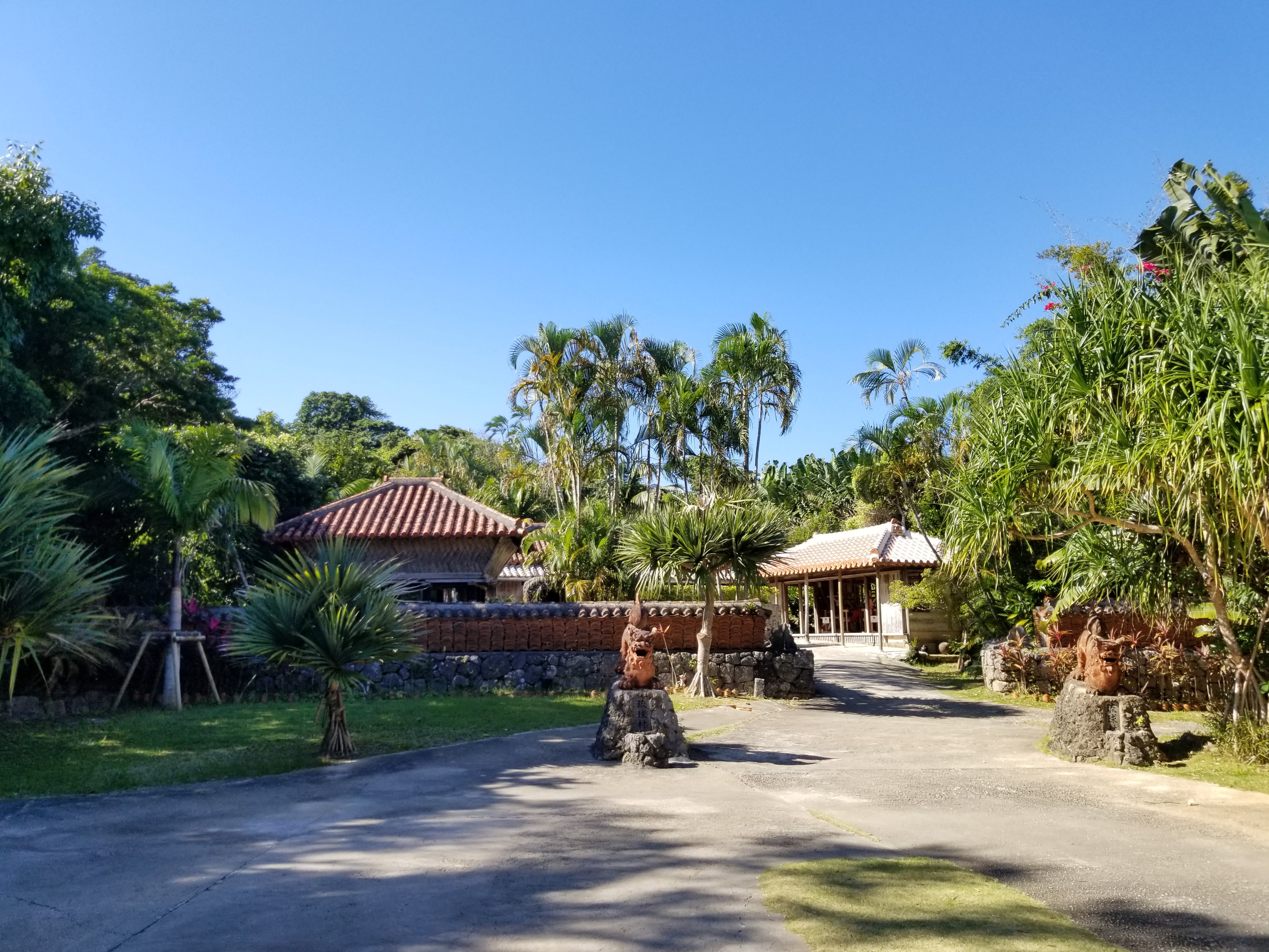
Entrance to the main village area of Ryukyu Mura

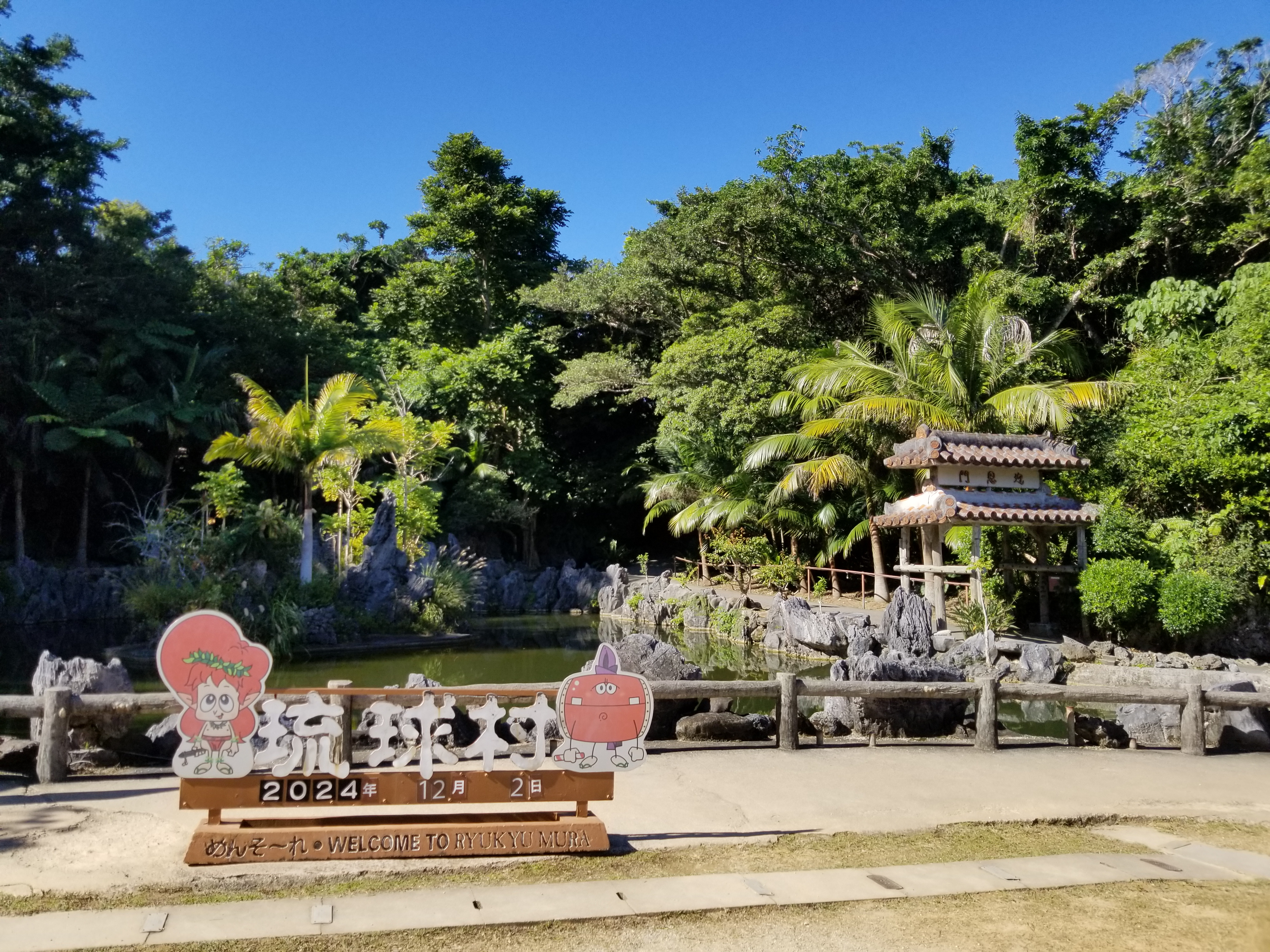
The Ryukyu Mura sign in the center of the village area, featuring the park's mascots: a kijimuna and a sentient taiko.

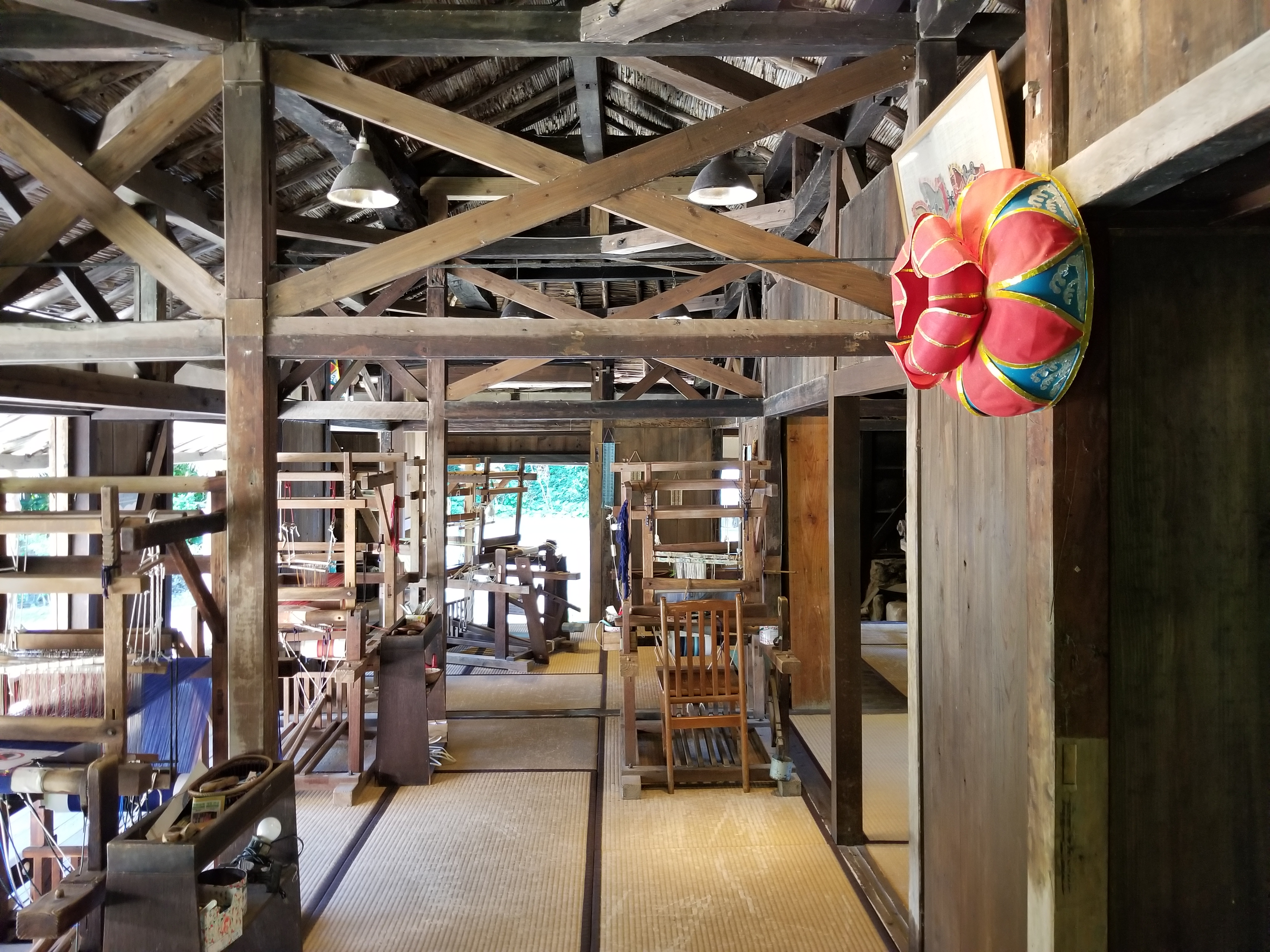
Interior of the former Nakasone family residence, originally built in 1808 in Yomitan village

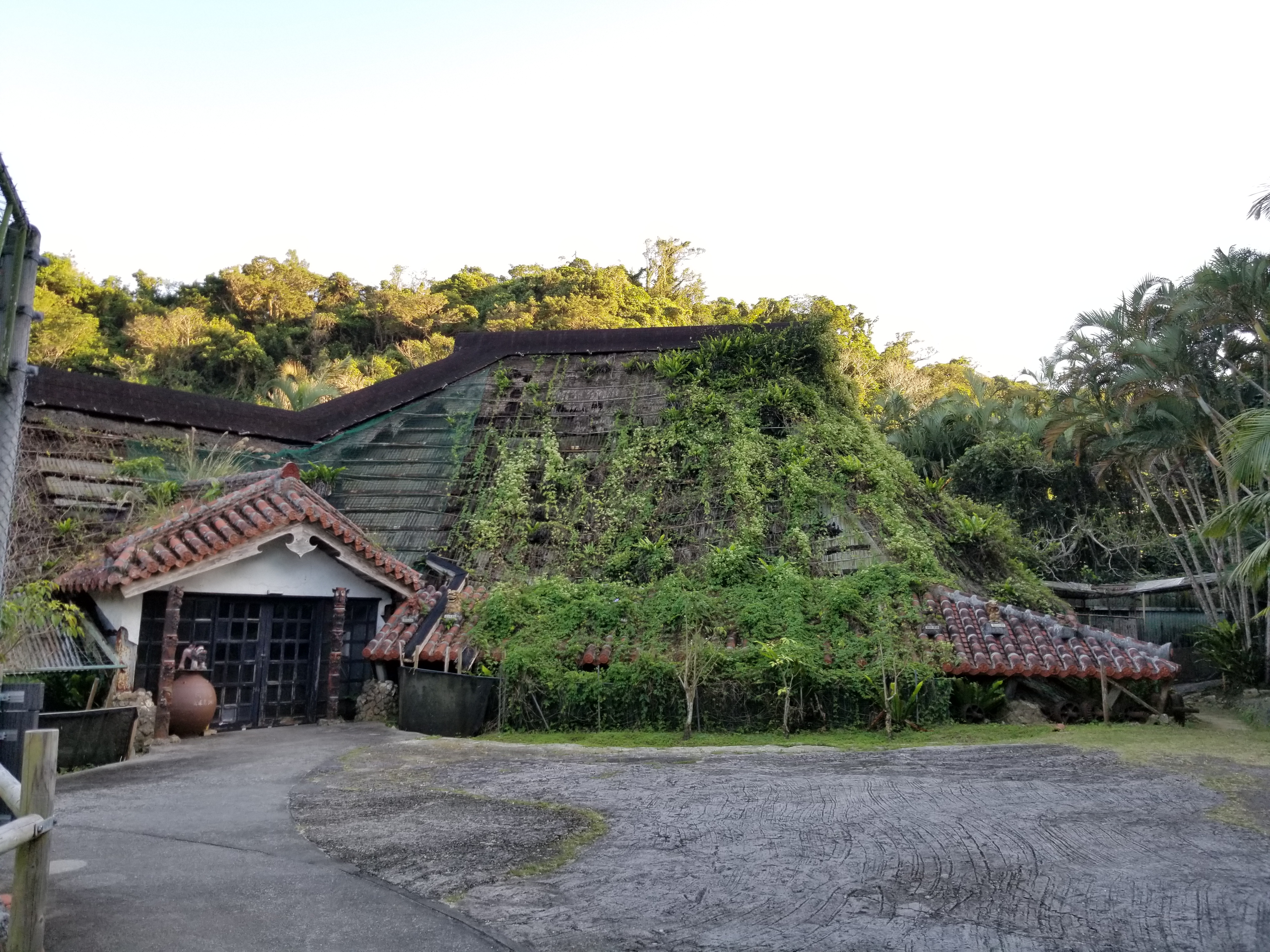
The Yachimun House is used for pottery workshops and liquor sales.

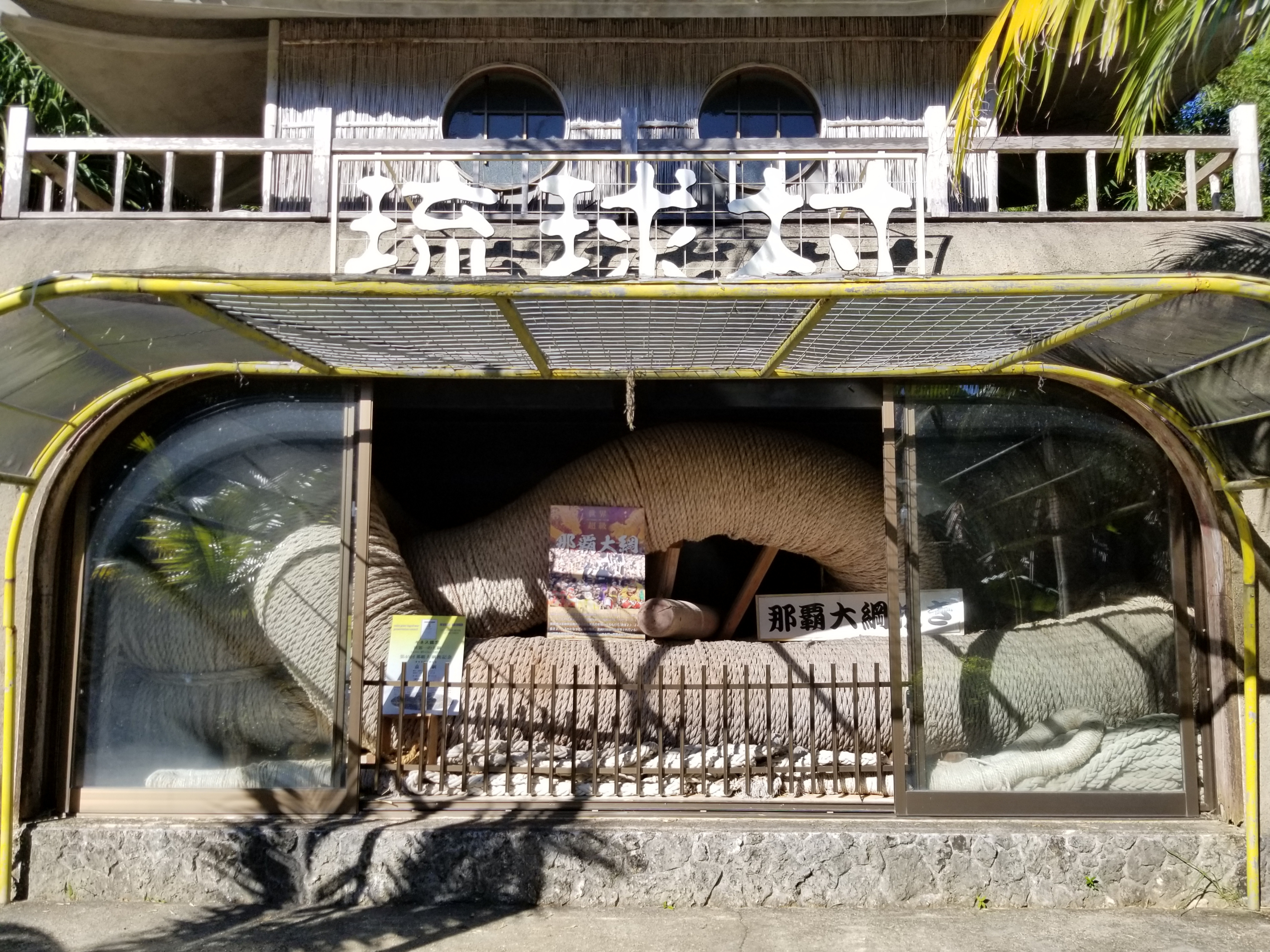
The rope used in the Naha Great Tug-of-War Festival is stored at Ryukyu Mura.

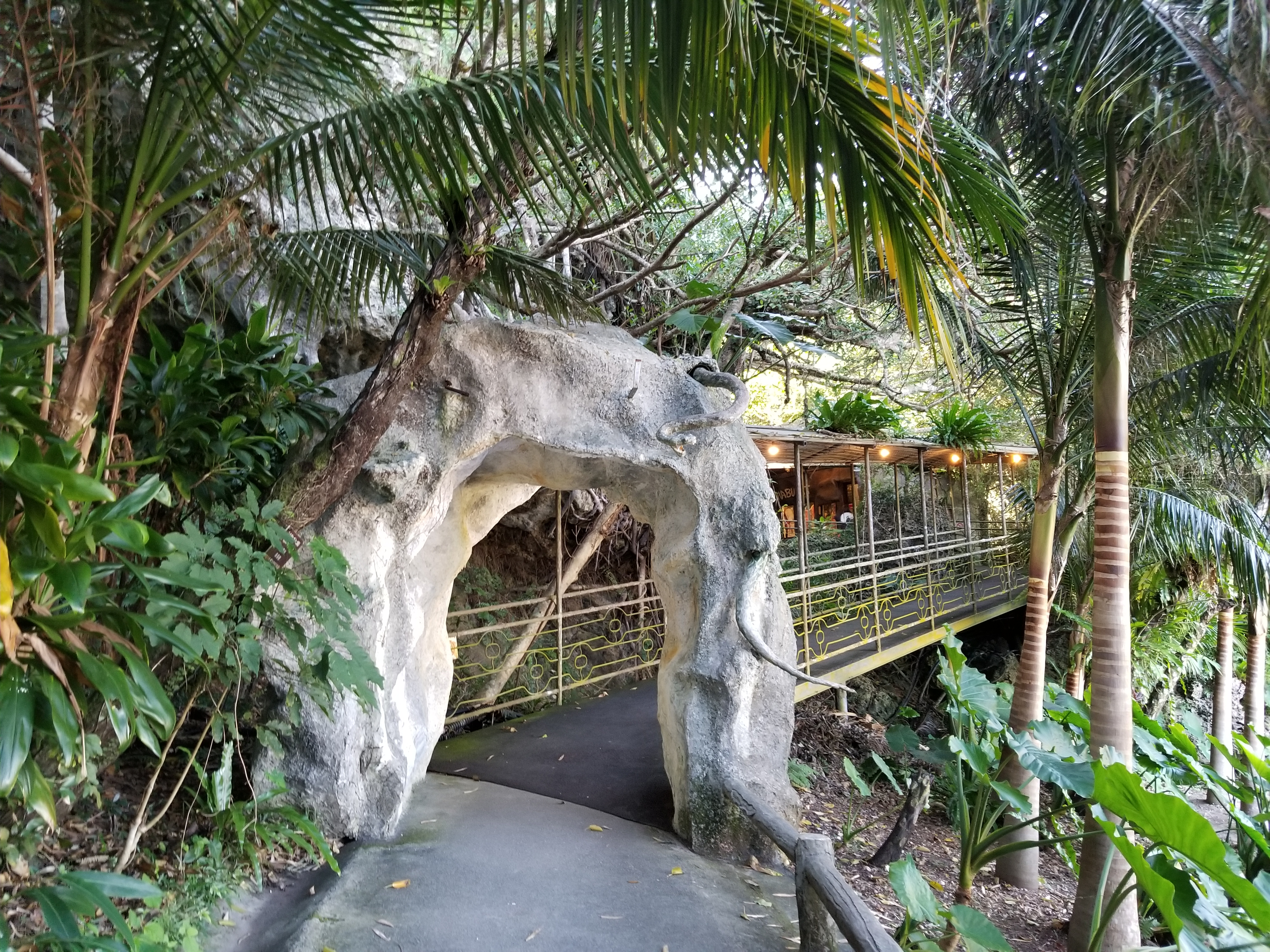
Bridge to Kijimuna Theatre

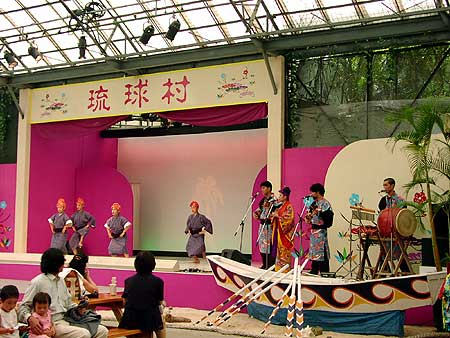
Performance near the main entrance to Ryukyu Mura

Video of a taiko eisa performance at Kijimuna Theatre

== See also ==
- Okinawa World
