= Okinawa World =

Theme park in Nanjo, Okinawa Prefecture

- Location: Nanjo, Okinawa
- Status: Operating
- Theme: Ryukyuan culture and history
- Website: en.gyokusendo.co.jp/okinawaworld/

Okinawa World (おきなわワールド, Okinawa wārudo) is a theme park in Nanjo, Okinawa.

== Attractions ==
Okinawa World was originally called Gyokusendo Park (玉泉洞公園, Gyokusendo Kōen), named after the Gyokusendo Caves. There is also a traditional Ryukyuan village showcasing glass making, Eisa dancing, and habu snakes.

== See also ==
- Ryukyu Mura
