= Ryukyukoku Matsuri Daiko Hawaii =

Ryukyukoku Matsuri Daiko Hawaii (琉球國祭り太鼓ハワイ支部) is a chapter of the Okinawan Eisā taiko ensemble Ryukyukoku Matsuri Daiko. Often called RMD Hawaii for short, the chapter has branches on Oahu, Kauai, Maui and the Big Island of Hawaii in Kohala and Waimea. The headquarters for the Hawaii chapter is on Oahu.

== History ==
Ryukyukoku Matsuri Daiko Hawaii was founded by Akemi Martin in 1996. The first performance in Hawaii was at the Kuakini Senior Center on June 20, 1997. On March 10, 2000 the club celebrated its third anniversary with a Nabiraki performance at the Ala Moana Hotel. Performers from the club headquarters in Okinawa as well as the Okinawan singer and songwriter Hidekatsu Kamei came to participate.

The Kauai branch was founded in 2002 and the Maui branch in 2003.

On April 1, 2007 the club celebrated its tenth anniversary with a recital at the Magic of Polynesia theater in Waikiki. Once again, performers from Okinawa and Hidekatsu Kamei came to participate.

The first Big Island branch was established in Kohala in 2008, and a branch in Waimea was established in December 2009. The Waimea group first performed in 2010.

The club celebrated its fifteenth anniversary on June 19, 2011 with a recital at the Blaisdell Concert Hall in Honolulu. Performers from RMD Okinawa, Nakasone Dance Academy – Hoogei Kai, Polynesian Cultural Center, as well as singers Hidekatsu Kamei and Shinsaku Ikeda performed with the Hawaii chapter.

In 2013 the Kauai Branch held a recital at the Kauaʻi Community College Performing Arts Center. Once again Hidekatsu Kamei came from Okinawa to perform, as well as members of the celebrated Okinawan Eisa group Requios.

== Activities ==
Ryukyukoku Matsuri Daiko Hawaii performs around the islands at public events as well as for private parties. The feature performance of the year is at the Hawaii United Okinawa Association's Okinawan Festival at Kapiolani Park in Honolulu each Labor Day weekend. Members from all the island branches come to perform together for this event. Other notable events the group performs at include the Japanese Cultural Center of Hawaii's Ohana New Years Festival at Moili'ili Park in Honolulu, the Hui Alu Kauai Okinawan Dance Festival on Kauai and the Waimea Cherry Blossom Festival in Waimea on the Big Island.

Each branch of the club also conducts beginner classes. On Oahu the classes are arranged through the Honolulu Department of Parks and Recreation.

== Style and choreography ==
All of the club's choreography is created in Okinawa by the members of the headquarters chapter. The club's style of eisā taiko is called "sosaku daiko" or creative taiko. It uses elements of traditional Okinawan Eisa and Karate in the choreography. The music ranges from traditional Okinawan and Japanese folk music to modern rock, and occasionally a blend of both. This style of taiko was created in Okinawa in 1982 by Ryukyukoku Matsuri Daiko.

Three types of drums are used by RMD performers. Unlike other forms of taiko, RMD's Okinawan Eisa taiko drummers all carry their own drum, usually using only one bachi (drumstick) to dance and drum. Some drummers use the o-daiko (a large drum carried on a purple sash over the left shoulder). Others play hand drums, either the shime-daiko (a double sided, knotted or tied drum) or the paranku (a single sided drum).

== Symbols ==
The logo for all Ryukyukoku Matsuri Daiko chapters around the world is a stylized version of the Japanese kanji for heart imposed over a circle in red and white. The logo symbolizes the spirit of Okinawan eisa taiko and friendship spreading around the world, a theme often promoted by the club.

Performers wear a black and white uniform styled on a Chinese costume called mumunchinhata. The uniform includes a red and gold obi and hachimaki or sagi for members in high school and older. Younger performers wear pink. Adult performers who use only the paranku wear purple. There are a variety of other colored uniforms including purple, red and green worn by performers who are dancing special parts.
