= Angama (dance) =

Style of dance in Japan's Yaeyama Islands

Angama (アンガマ) or angama odori (angama dance) is a style of dancing that is performed in many communities of Japan's Yaeyama Islands during the Bon Festival, which is known as sōrin (< shōryō (精霊)) in Yaeyama. A related performance is known as mushāma in Hateruma. In Kohama Island, the northern community performs a dance named jiruku while the southern community performs Minma buduri.

== Etymology ==
There is no consensus on the etymology of angama. One theory decomposes angama into *an (possibly meaning mother) and *gama (possibly a diminutive suffix). Another theory relates angama to "elder sister" (angwā in Okinawan). Some argue that it might mean "disguise of a mask".

== Nenbutsu practice ==
Angama shares its mainland Japanese origin with Okinawa's Eisā. The songs to which people dance are called nenbutsu songs. According to the genealogy of the San'yō lineage, nenbutsu practice was brought from Ryūkyū in 1657 when Yaeyama's samurai leader Miyara Chōjū traveled to Okinawa to pay tribute. It is known from other sources that by that time nenbutsu practice had spread to the capital Shuri–Naha region of Okinawa Island. There were at least two traditions of nenbutsu practice. One was started in the 1600s by Taichū (1552–1639), a Jōdo sect monk from Mutsu Province, and was carried on by his followers in Kakinohana, Naha. The other was performed by the Chondarā, a Shuri-based group of puppeteers, who also had mainland Japanese roots. Folklorist Shinjō Toshio argued that what Miyara Chōjū learned must have been Taichū's one. Sakai Masako, a researcher on folk music, questioned Shinjō's theory. Pointing out that Yaeyama has a larger repository of nenbutsu songs than Okinawa, she presumed multiple origins of nenbutsu songs. It was considered taboo to sing nenbutsu songs out of season.

== Performances ==
According to the local historian Kishaba Eijun, angama traditions can be divided into two groups: one is performed by the four samurai communities of Ishigaki Island and the other is of commoners in rural communities and remote islands. He argued that the latter had better preserved its traditional way. In the samurai communities of Ishigaki, a group of people with drums (taiko) and sanshin parades around houses of each village. They enter a house that is surrounded by a larger number of spectators. Once everyone sits, Uya nu Ugun (親の御恩, or Nzō Nenbutsu 無蔵念仏) was sung to mark the beginning, and dancers clap with the beat. Dances and songs alternate with question and answer, in which two masked character Ushumai (old man) and Nmi (old woman) represent ancestral spirits and answer in a humorous way to questions about the afterlife asked by villagers. Kishaba noted that what distinguished samurai's angama from the rural one was that the former was an indoor performance.

In rural communities, angama dances are performed in the garden. A group of people forms a circle. In the center people sing and play drums, flutes, gongs and sanshin, depending on regional variants, and they are surrounded by male and female dancers. "Shichigwachi Nenbutsu" (七月念仏), "KōKō Nenbutsu" (孝行念仏) and "Chonjon Nenbutsu" (仲順念仏) were mainly sung.
