= Angama, Niari =

Angama
- Village
- Location in the Republic of the Congo
- Coordinates: 2°24′05″S 12°30′29″E
- Country: Republic of the Congo
- Department: Niari Department
- Time zone: UTC+1 (WAT)

Angama is a river village in the Niari Department of the Republic of the Congo. It lies on the border with Gabon in the forest. The village is very isolated with no roads communications, only by river.
