= Eisa (dance) =

Okinawan folk dance

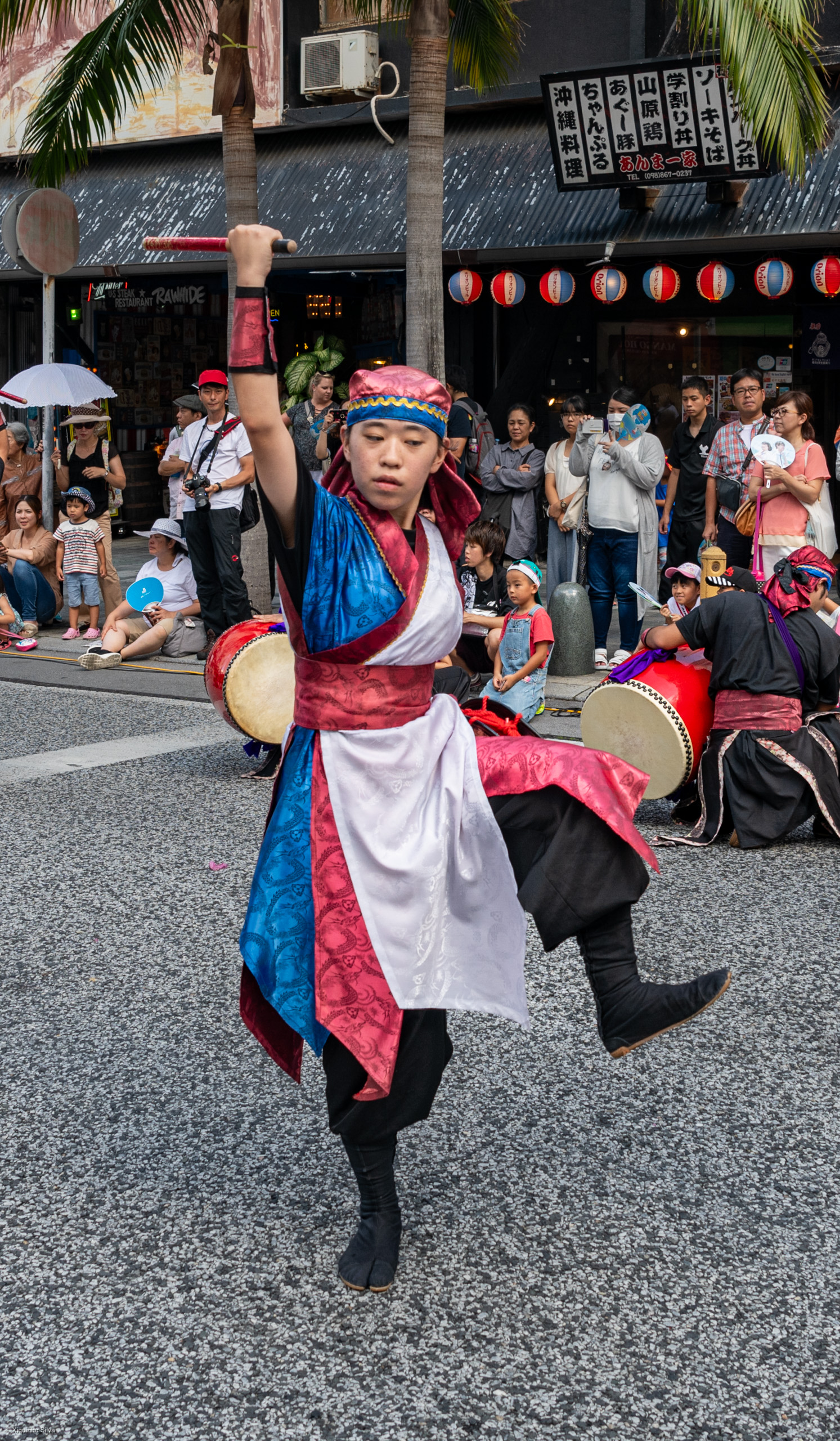
Eisa performance in Naha

Eisa (Okinawan: エイサー, romanized: Eisā) is a folk dance originating from Okinawa Island in the Ryukyu Islands. It is derived from the Obon (Okinawan: Bun / usōrō, ブン / ウソーロー, 盆) dance that is performed by young people of each community during Obon festival to honor the spirits of their ancestors. It underwent drastic changes in the 20th century and is today seen as a vital part of Okinawan culture.

== Style ==
Modern Eisa is danced by 20 to 30 young men or women, mainly in doubled lines or circles to the accompaniment of singing, chanting, and drumming by the dancers as well as by folk songs played on the sanshin. Three types of drums are used in various combinations, depending upon regional style: the ōdaiko (大太鼓), a large barrel drum; the shimedaiko (締太鼓), a medium-sized drum similar to ones used in Noh theatre; and the paarankuu (Okinawan: パーランクー), a small hand drum similar to ones used in Buddhist ceremony. The dancers also sometimes play small hand gongs and yotsutake castanets. Eisa dancers wear various costumes, usually according to local tradition and gender of the dancer; modern costumes are often brightly colored and feature a characteristic, colorful knotted turban. Special vests, leggings, and shoes are also popular.

== History ==
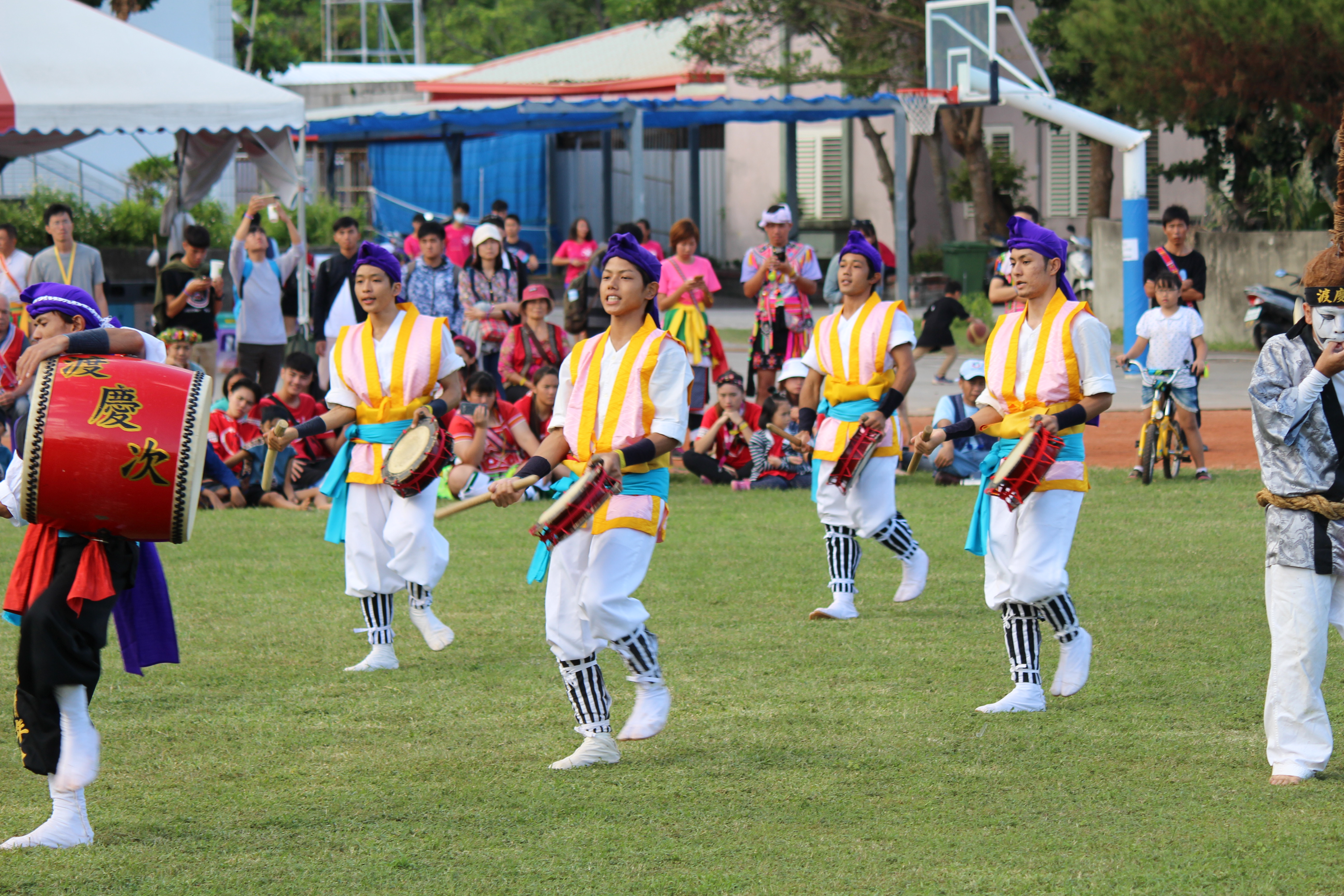
Members of the Tokeshi Youth Association of Yomitan perform a traditional Eisa in Dulan, Taiwan

=== Origin ===
The origin of Eisa is unclear, like for many other folk performing arts. Iha Fuyū argued that the name of Eisa was related to wesa omoro (Okinawan: ゑさおもろ), a phrase appearing in Volume 14 of the Omoro Sōshi (16th–17th centuries). This theory is no longer supported. It is more likely that the name derived from an exclamation used in the original song of Eisa, the Mamauya Ninbuchi (Okinawan: 継親念仏). The standardization of the written form was relatively new. Meiji era newspaper articles used various forms including yensaa (イェンサー), yaisaa (ヤイサー), and ensaa (エンサー).

The core of Eisa consists of nembutsu songs. The Ryūkyū-koku yuraiki (1713) attributes the introduction of nembutsu to Taichū (1552–1639), a Jōdo sect monk from Mutsu Province. According to the record, he translated Buddhist teaching into the vernacular speech and taught it to the people of Naha during the reign of Shō Nei. Other sources confirm that Taichū stayed in the capital region for three years in the early 1600s and converted the king and other high-ranking officials. Some researchers speculate that he introduced odori nembutsu or dancing nembutsu to Naha. However, Taichū's teaching did not prevail; it was barely carried on by his followers in Kakinohana, Naha.

Another important factor related to the origin of Eisa is Chondaraa (チョンダラー), a group of puppeteers. The Ryūkyū-koku yuraiki records two theories regarding the etymology of Chondaraa. One is that it indicates their origin, Kyoto. The other is that its founder was named Kyō (no) Kotarō (京小太郎). The fact that their origin had been obscured by the early 18th century suggests that they came from mainland Japan a long time ago. Based on modern-day Shuri Kubagawa-chō (part of the capital Shuri), they performed puppet plays, chanted Banzei (manzai) on celebratory occasions and sang nembutsu songs as a funeral service. For these reasons, they were also called Ninbuchaa (nembutsu prayer) or Yanzayaa (banzei chanter). It is uncertain if the Chondaraa performed nembutsu from the very beginning or learned later from a different group. Unlike Taichū's followers, they wandered around Okinawa Island.

The spread of nembutsu from mainland Japan was not limited to Okinawa. In the Yaeyama Islands, Bon dance is usually called Angama and is accompanied with nembutsu songs. The Amami Islands also have nembutsu songs, but at least some of them may belong to a tradition different from Okinawa's Chondaraa. Note that these traditions are not identified with Eisa. Eisa is considered specific to the Okinawa Islands.

=== Pre-World War II traditions ===
It is not clear when nembutsu songs spread to central Okinawa, which later played a central role in transforming Eisa. According to an oral tradition, Eisa was introduced to Kamiyama, Ginowan in the Meiji period, when a wealthy farmer invited performers from Shuri and made them teach Bon dance to young villagers. The community of Ganeko, Ginowan has a similar oral history. It appears that Eisa spread to northern Okinawa from the late Meiji period to the early Shōwa period. Several communities in northern Okinawa believe that Eisa was introduced from Sesoko, Motobu, a supplying center of seasonal workers.

Eisa was originally performed at the Bon Festival. It is not known when it extended to other occasions. Newspaper articles confirm that Eisa, together with other folk performing arts, had been performed as an attraction at various government-sponsored exhibitions in central Okinawa already in 1900s.

=== Post-World War II transformation ===
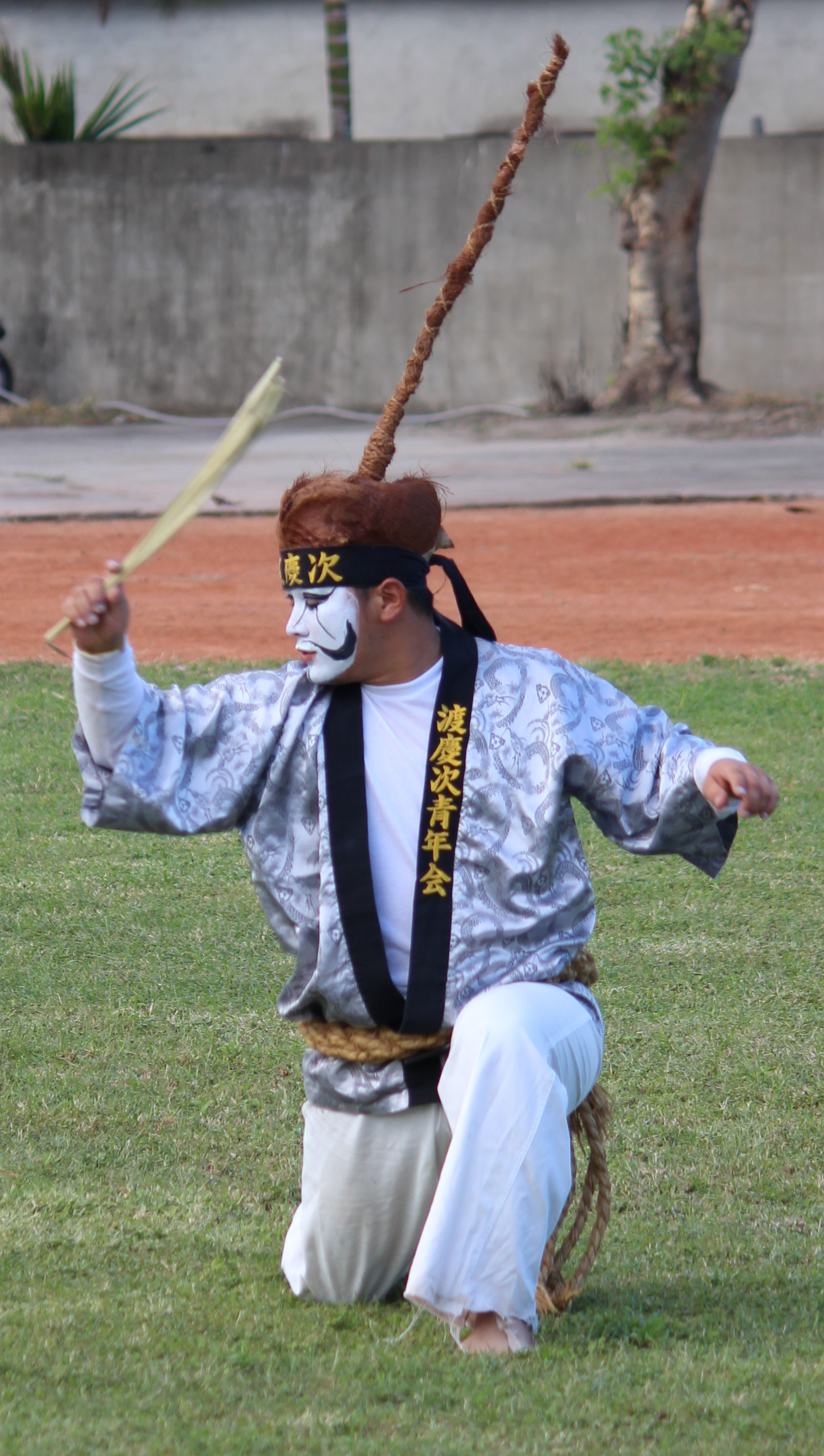
Eisa performer from the Tokeshi Youth Association of Yomitan

Eisa underwent drastic changes in post-World War II Okinawa. In 1956, then under U.S. occupation, the first Zentō Eisa Contest was held in Koza (part of the modern-day Okinawa City). It was originally an effort to recover from the great damage to the base-dependent commercial city caused by the "Off Limits" ordinance by the U.S. military. As a contest, participating groups were judged by screening criteria such as costumes, formation, technique, the number of performers, and innovativeness. Folklorist Kumada Susumu noted values imposed by the criteria. They clearly emphasized group dynamics, although earlier groups were not necessarily large. Contrary to today's perception of Eisa as Okinawa's tradition, they did encourage the creative nature of Eisa. In fact it was not uncommon to wear Western clothing during the performance.

Another major event, the "Youth Furusato Eisa Festival," began in Naha in 1964, originally under the name of "All Okinawa Seinen Eisa Contest." At first, both events were competitive. In 1975, the latter abolished the contest and changed itself into a non-competitive festival, which was followed by the former in 1977. One reason behind the change was that some youth associations started showing their dissatisfaction at values imposed by the contests. Eisa had changed itself into spectacular group dynamics that was to fascinate the audience. To give the performance more punch, participating groups adopted an increasingly large number of drums. The adoption of luxurious uniforms was another effort to win the contest.

Taiko Eisa performance at Ryukyu Mura's Kijimuna Theatre

In modern Okinawa, Eisa has gradually changed itself into popular entertainment by incorporating non-Buddhist folk songs and by adding visually appealing choreography although the Eisa dance still began with nembutsu songs such as Mamauya Ninbuchi, Chōja nu Nagari (長者の流れ), and Yamabushi (山伏). It has also developed regional variants. Yukio Kobayashi, a researcher of Okinawan folk songs, identifies four forms of Eisa:

1. Taiko Eisa: mainly performed in central Okinawa. A parade is led by male drummers and is followed by female or mixed dancers. A dozen songs are performed in a mid-tempo.
2. Paarankuu Eisa: distributed in Uruma of midwestern Okinawa. A parade led by hand drummers and followed by a mixed group of men and women. A dozen songs are performed in an unhurried tempo.
3. Drumless Eisa: typical of the Motobu Peninsula (Nago, Motobu and Nakijin) in northern Okinawa. Men and women line up in a circle around a wooden scaffold where sanshin is played. Dancers use no drum. A dozen to twenty songs are performed in a fast tempo.
4. Female Eisa: distributed in the northern end of Okinawa. A dozen to twenty songs with varying tempo are performed solely by women.

Kobayashi analyzes modern Eisa as a result of the effort by each community's newly organized youth associations, an influence from sophisticated theatrical performance of Naha, and a social movement of modernization that forced young people to turn from "sexually explicit" gatherings to the "healthy" dance.

=== Creative Eisa ===
The 1980s saw the beginning of a new style of Eisa, called "creative Eisa" or "club team Eisa," which holds many distinctions from traditional forms of Eisa. Whereas traditionally Eisa groups consist of people from a village or community due to the sacredness of the activity in honoring the ancestors of a specific community, creative Eisa teams are usually independent of local communities, and admit anyone regardless of their heritage. Creative Eisa is characterized largely by its song selection, with groups usually choosing to dance to newer songs, rather than the traditional standards. Hidekatsu, a Taketomi-born Ryukyu music artist, has become one of the most popular artists that creative Eisa groups dance to. His hit song, Mirukumunari, has become one of the most frequently performed creative Eisa dances. Hidekatsu is unique in that his songs are almost entirely sung in the Ryukyuan languages, which is a marked departure from most modern day Ryukyu pop singers, who sing primarily in Japanese, making Hidekatsu's music a vital link for young modern Ryukyuans to the languages of their ancestors, who otherwise receive little exposure to the languages. All of the Ryukyu languages are endangered due to over a century of social and political prejudice against the Ryukyu languages by the Japanese government.

Some examples of creative Eisa clubs include Ryukyukoku Matsuri Daiko and Chinagu Eisa (based in Hawaiʻi). Ryukyukoku Matsuri Daiko, formed in 1982, was one of the first creative Eisa clubs, and has since expanded to form chapters in mainland Japan, Hawaiʻi, the mainland United States, and other locations with Okinawan populations. Whereas traditionally men would dance Eisa utilizing drums, while women would dance drumless, creative Eisa features many women who choose to dance with drums.

In addition to having the freedom of dancing to new songs, creative Eisa groups often create their own choreographies, typically using elements of traditional Eisa and karate.

Since its formation, creative Eisa has become hugely popular in Okinawa, and has also been exported to the Miyako and Yaeyama Islands, Yoron Island (1992) Okinoerabu Island (1993), Kagoshima Prefecture, and to the Kantō and Kansai regions, where people of Okinawan descent concentrated. Creative Eisa has also been exported internationally to virtually anywhere with sizeable Okinawan populations, such as Hawaiʻi, the continental United States, and South America.

For many young Ryukyuans in the 21st century, creative Eisa has become an integral part of their cultural identity, providing a vital link between tradition and modern creativity.

One consequence of the rise of creative Eisa is a crisis in authenticity. In response, youth associations increasingly see their community-based Eisa as Okinawan tradition although the perceived tradition is a result of "growing pains" up to 1970s.

== See also ==
- Ryukyukoku Matsuri Daiko Hawaii
