= Shisa =

Ryukyuan guardian lion statue

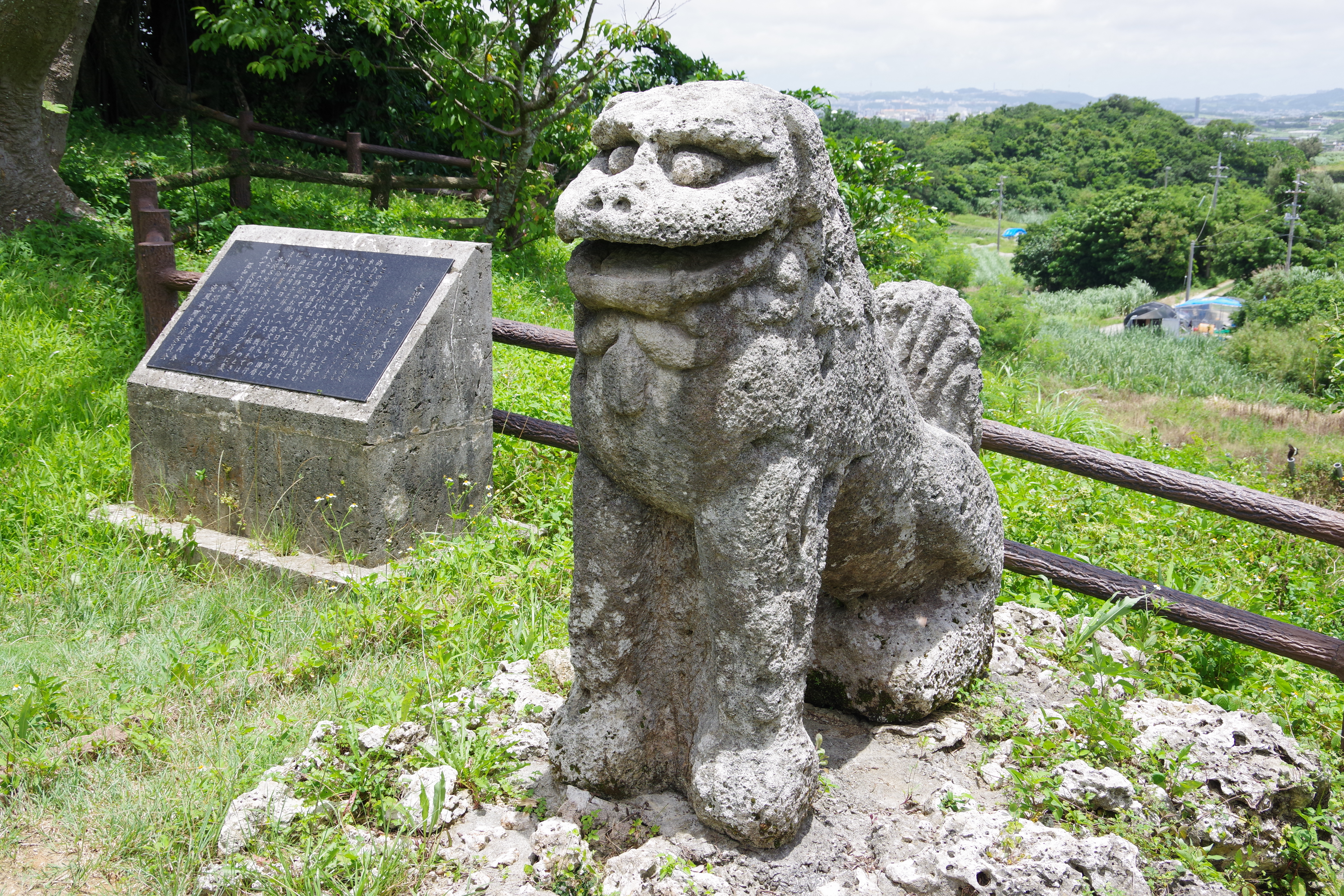
Tomori shisa

Shisa (シーサー, shīsā or shiisaa) is a traditional Ryukyuan cultural artifact and decoration derived from Chinese guardian lions, often seen in similar pairs, resembling a cross between a lion and a dog, from Okinawan mythology. Shisa are wards, believed to protect from some evils. People place pairs of shisa on their rooftops or flanking the gates to their houses, with the left shisa traditionally having a closed mouth, the right one an open mouth. The open mouth shisa traditionally wards off evil spirits, and the closed mouth shisa keeps good spirits in.

== History ==
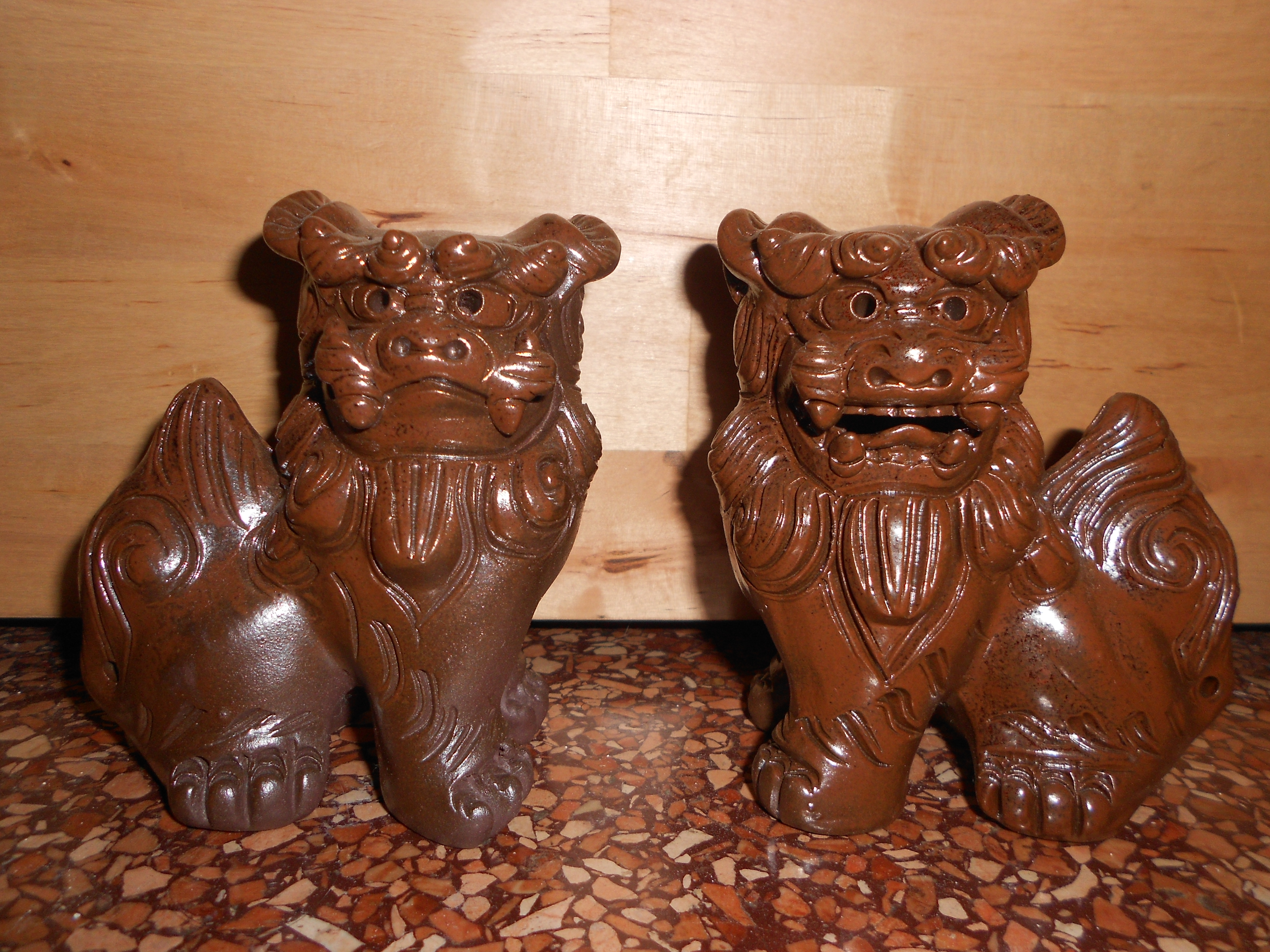
A pair of shisa, one with mouth closed

Like the komainu ("lion dogs"), the shisa are a variation of the guardian lions from China. From the Edo period, they started to be called "guardian dogs" in general in mainland Japan. Komainu is traditionally called "Sisi Komainu". The one with open mouth is "Sisi" and the one with closed mouth is "Komainu". The Okinawan word "Shisa" took the first part of "Sisi Komainu". In Yaenaman dialect, Shisa is called "Sisi" which is closer to original Japanese word. Gender is variously assigned to the shisa. Some Okinawans believe the male has his mouth closed to keep bad out of the home, while the female has her mouth open to share goodness. Others believe the female has her mouth closed to "keep in the good", while the male has his mouth open to "scare away the bad" (Compare this to the distinction between male and female guardian lions in Chinese culture).

== Legend ==
When a Chinese emissary returned from a voyage to the court at Shuri Castle, he brought a gift for the king, a necklace decorated with a figurine of a shisa. The king found it charming and wore it underneath his clothes. At the Naha Port bay, the village of Madanbashi was often terrorized by a sea dragon who ate the villagers and destroyed their property. One day, the king was visiting the village, and one of these attacks happened; all the people ran and hid. The local noro had been told in a dream to instruct the king when he visited to stand on the beach and lift up his figurine towards the dragon; she sent the boy, Chiga, to tell him the message. He faced the monster with the figurine held high, and immediately a giant roar sounded all through the village, a roar so deep and powerful that it even shook the dragon. A massive boulder then fell from heaven and crushed the dragon's tail, so that he couldn't move, and eventually died. This boulder and the dragon's body became covered with plants and surrounded by trees, and can still be seen today as the "Gana-mui Woods" near Naha Ohashi bridge. The townspeople then built a large stone shisa to protect it from the dragon's spirit and other threats.

== Great Stone Shisa at Tomimori ==
At Tomimori Village near Kochinda Town in the far southern part of Okinawa, there were often many fires. The people of the area sought out Saiouzui, a Feng Shui master, to ask him why there were so many fires. He believed they were because of the power of the nearby Mt. Yaese, and suggested that the townspeople build a stone shisa to face the mountain. They did so, and thus have protected their village from fire ever since.

== Bibliography ==
- Chizue, Sesoko. Legends of Okinawa. First publication, in Okinawa, 1969.

== Gallery ==
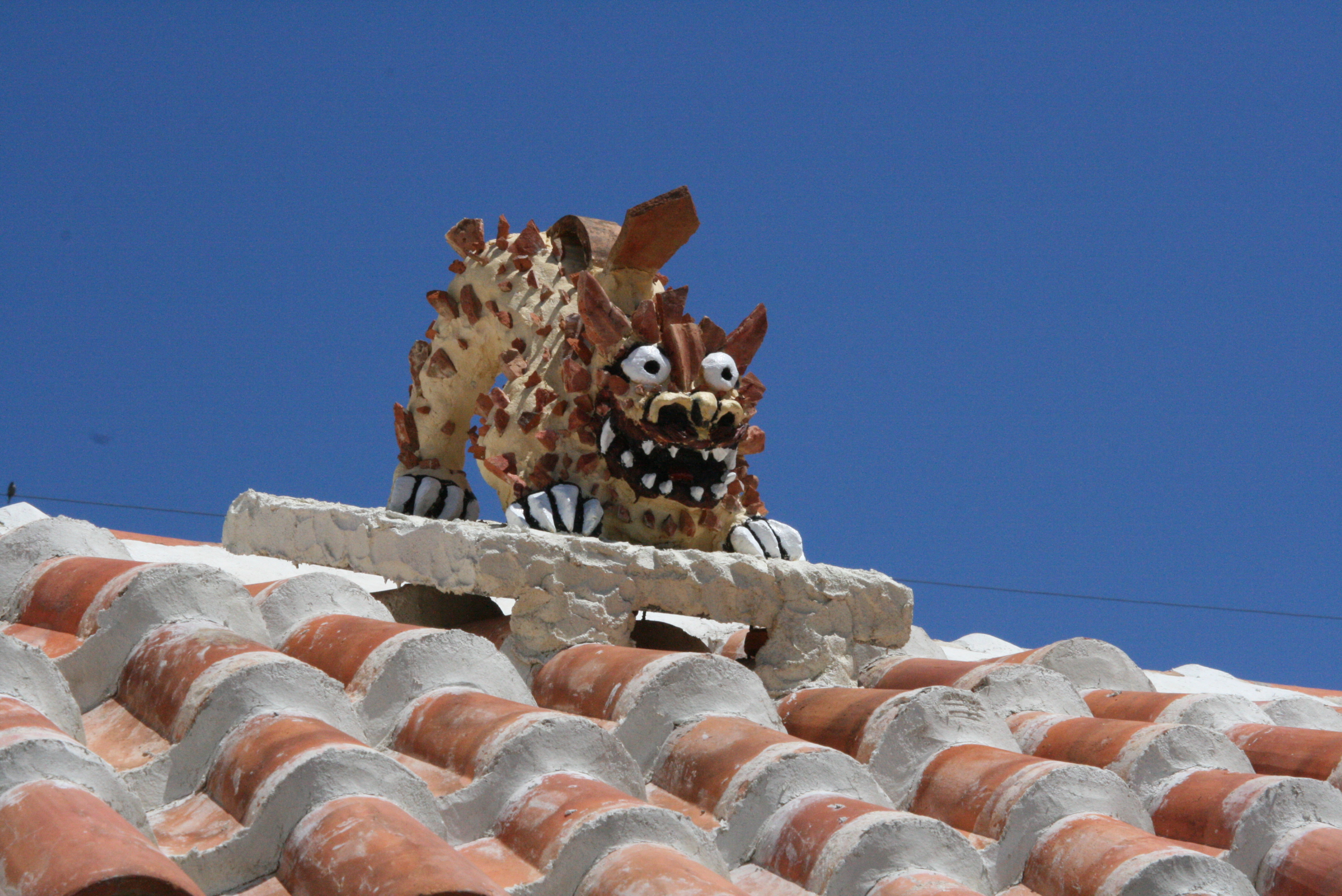
Shisa in Nago, Okinawa Prefecture

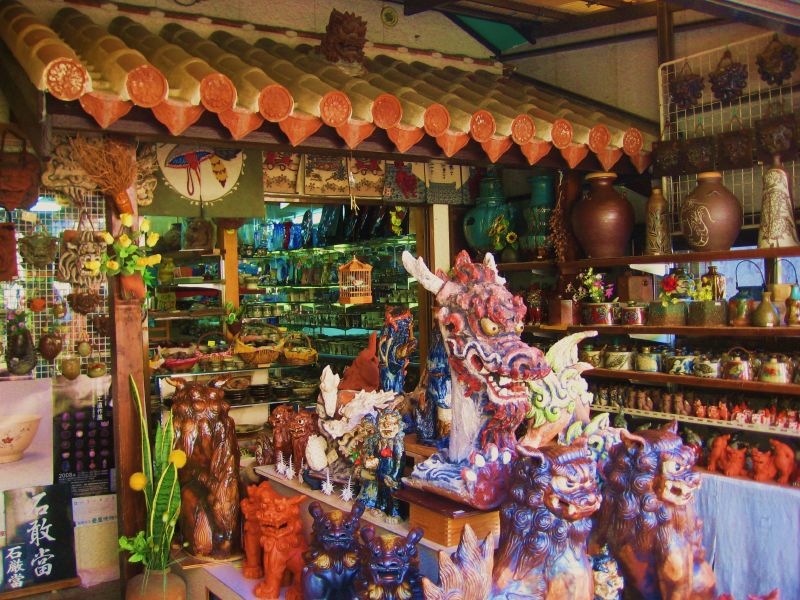
Varieties of shisa (excluding the dragon) at a shop

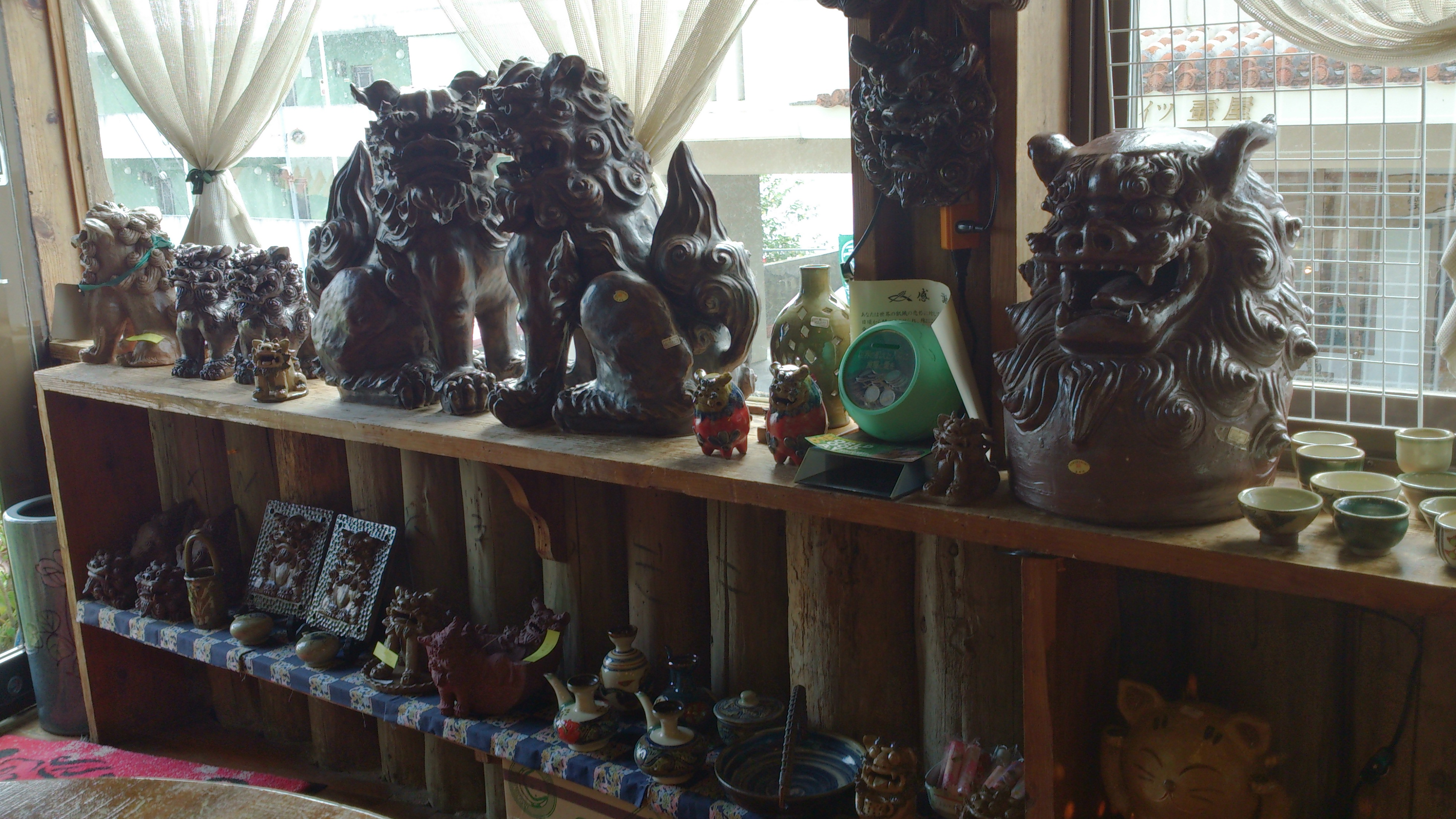
Shisa at a shop

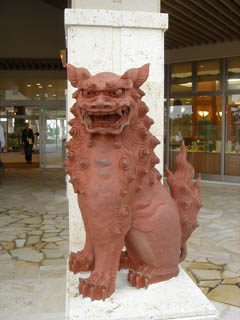
Typical (right-side) shisa

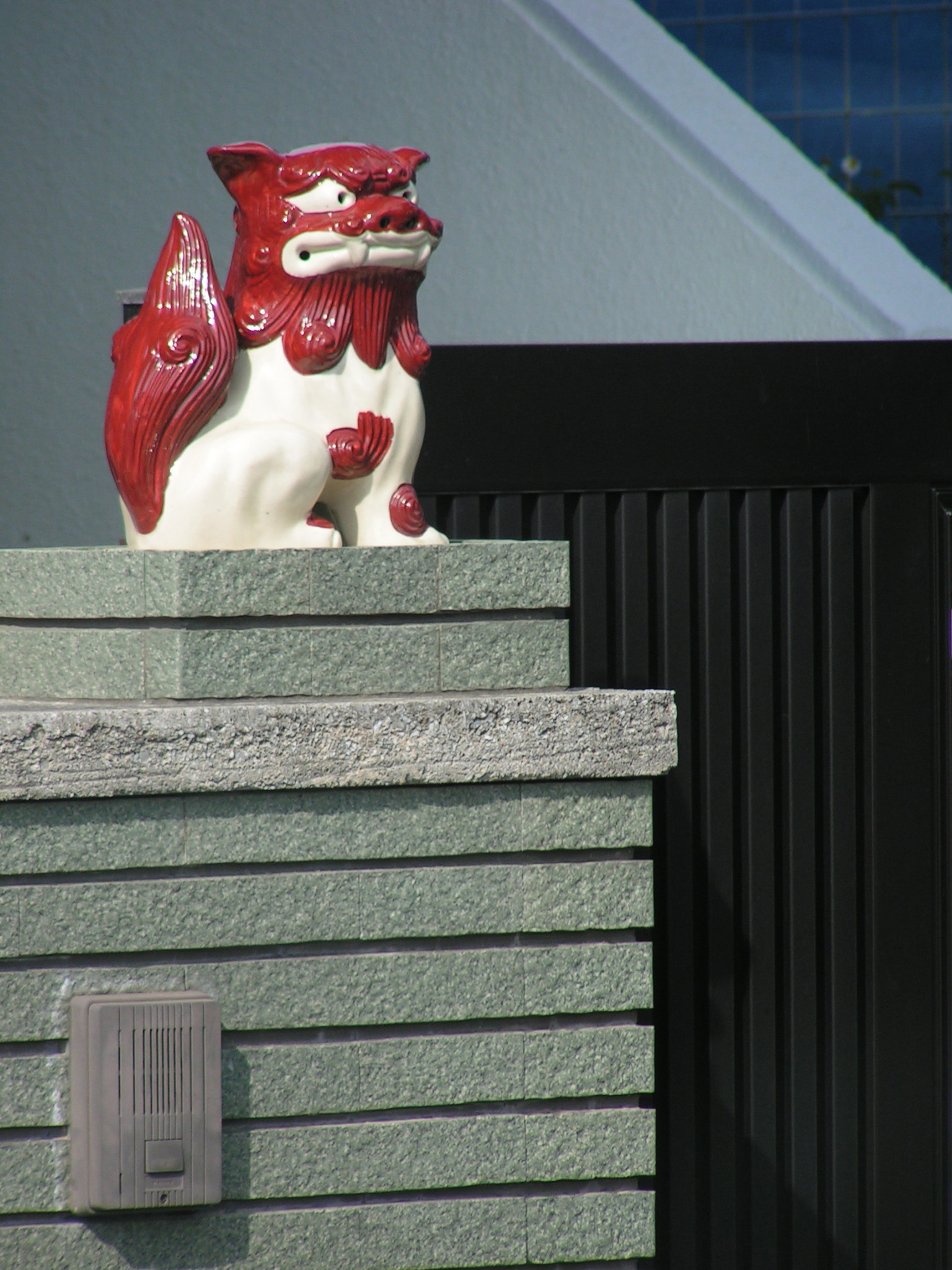
A closed-mouth (left-side) shisa

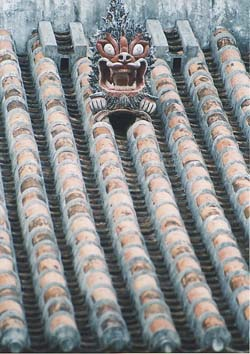
Open-mouthed shisa on a traditional tile roof in Okinawa Prefecture

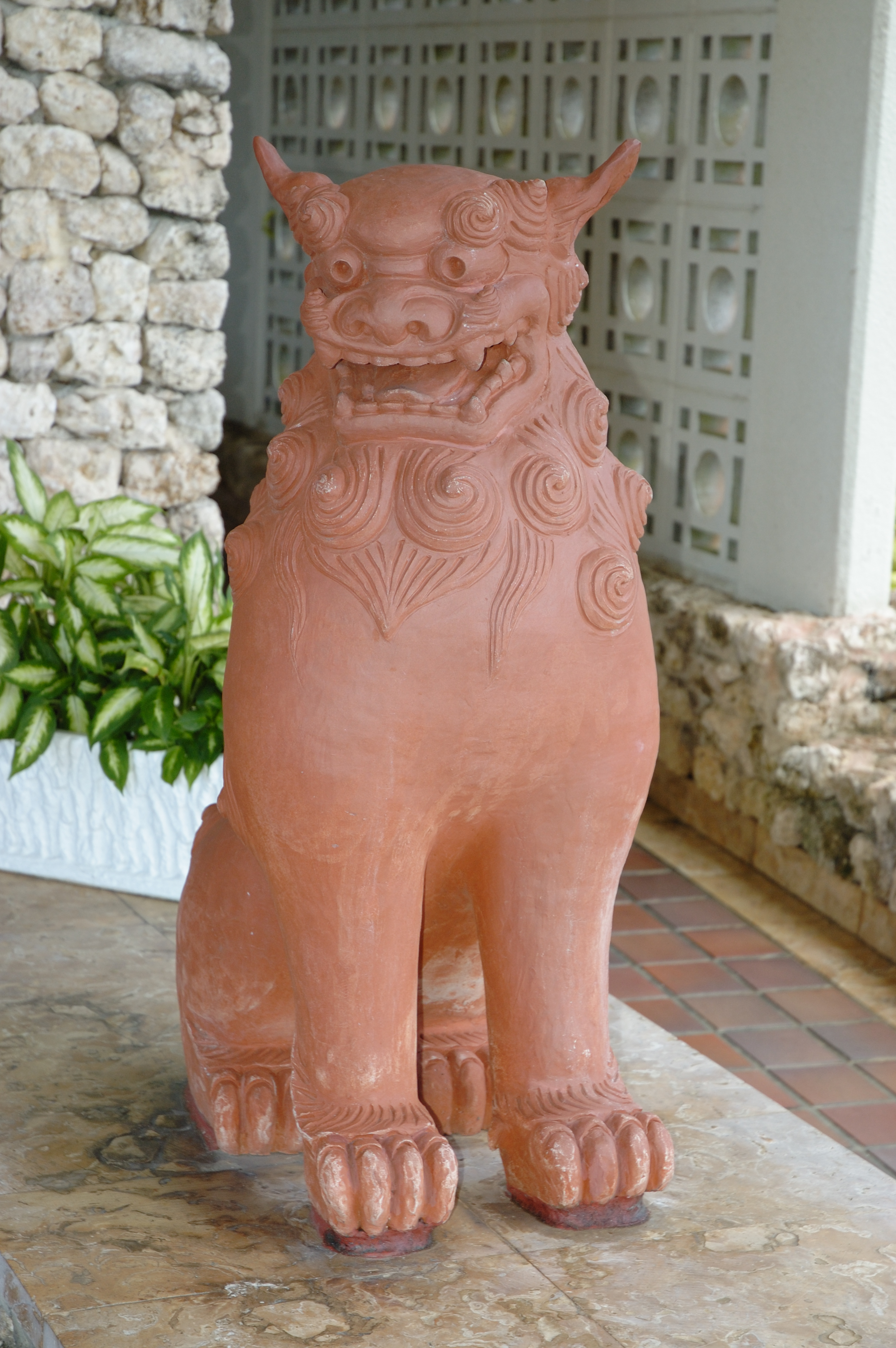
Shisa statue on Miyako Island

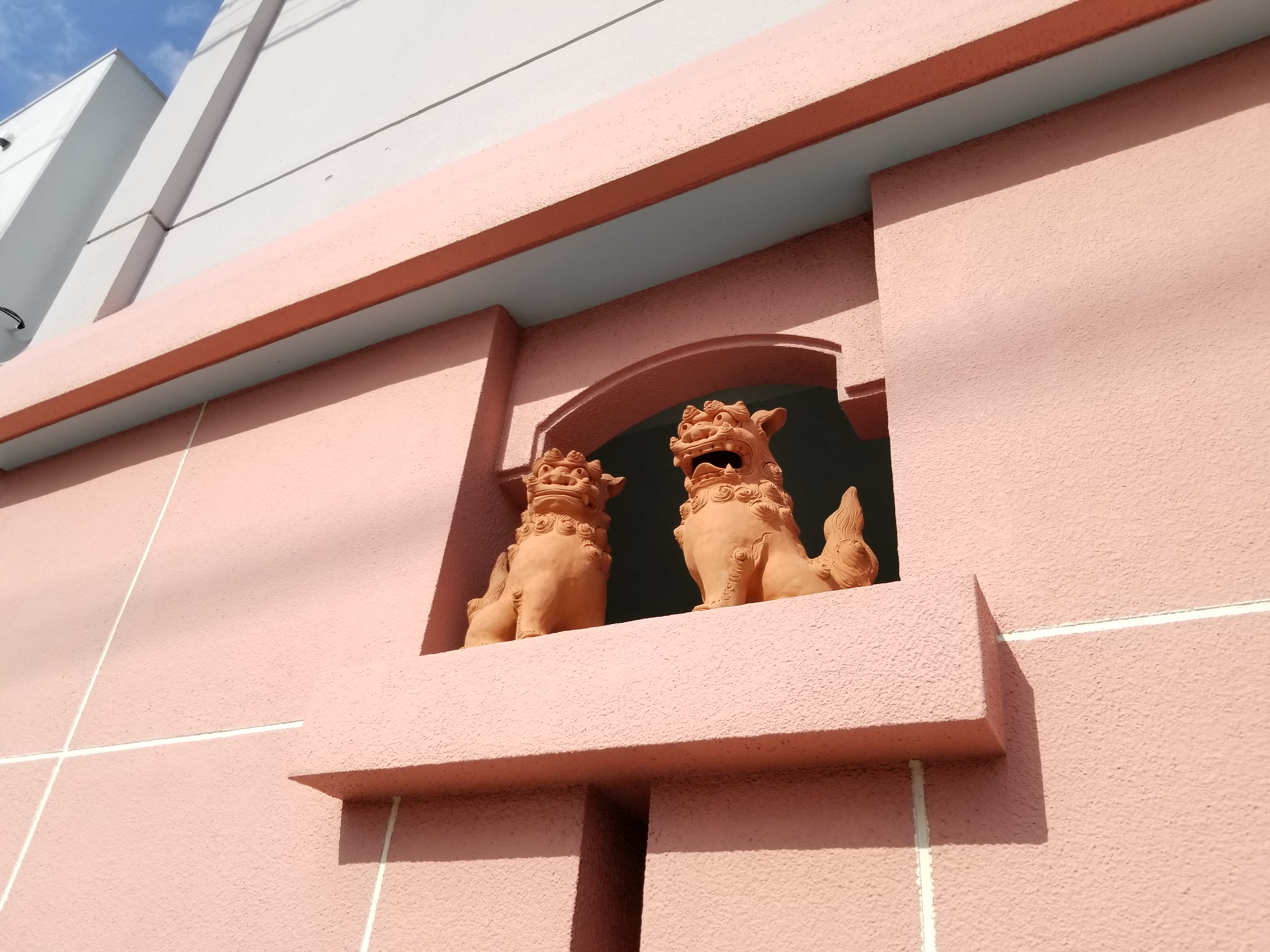
Pair of shisa inside a building wall in Naha

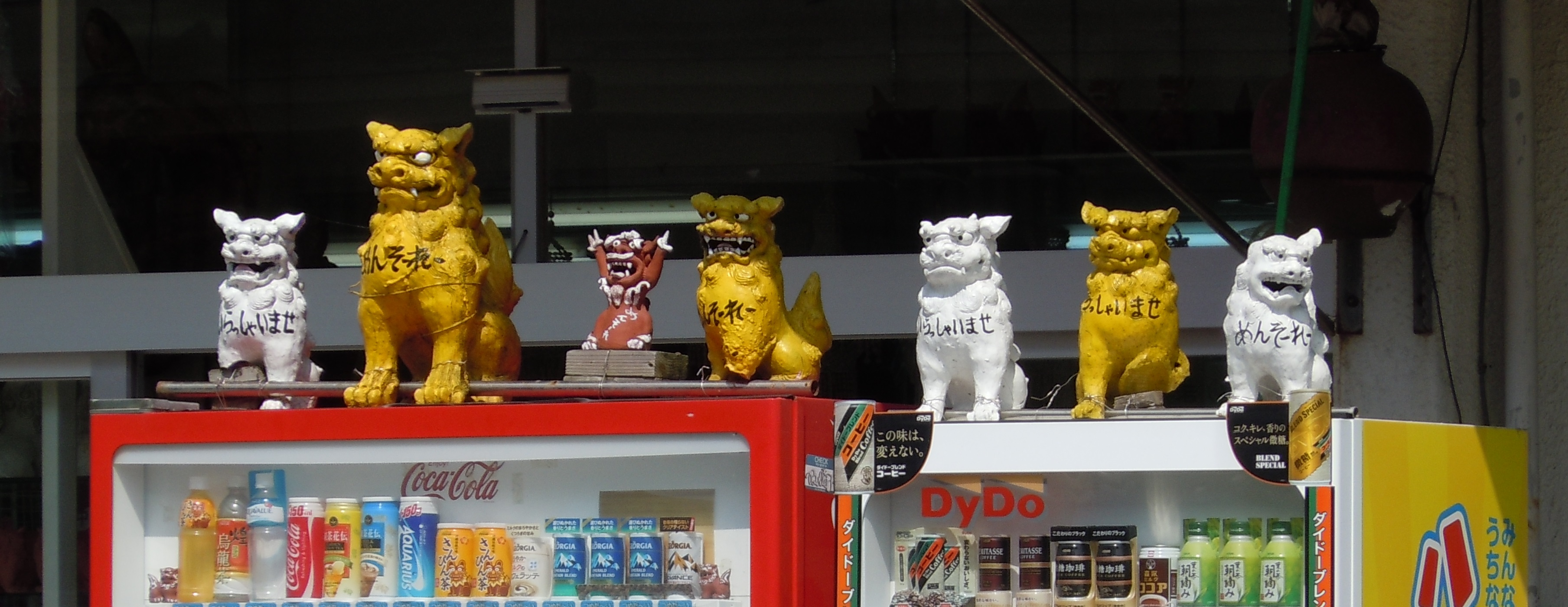
Shisa on vending machines

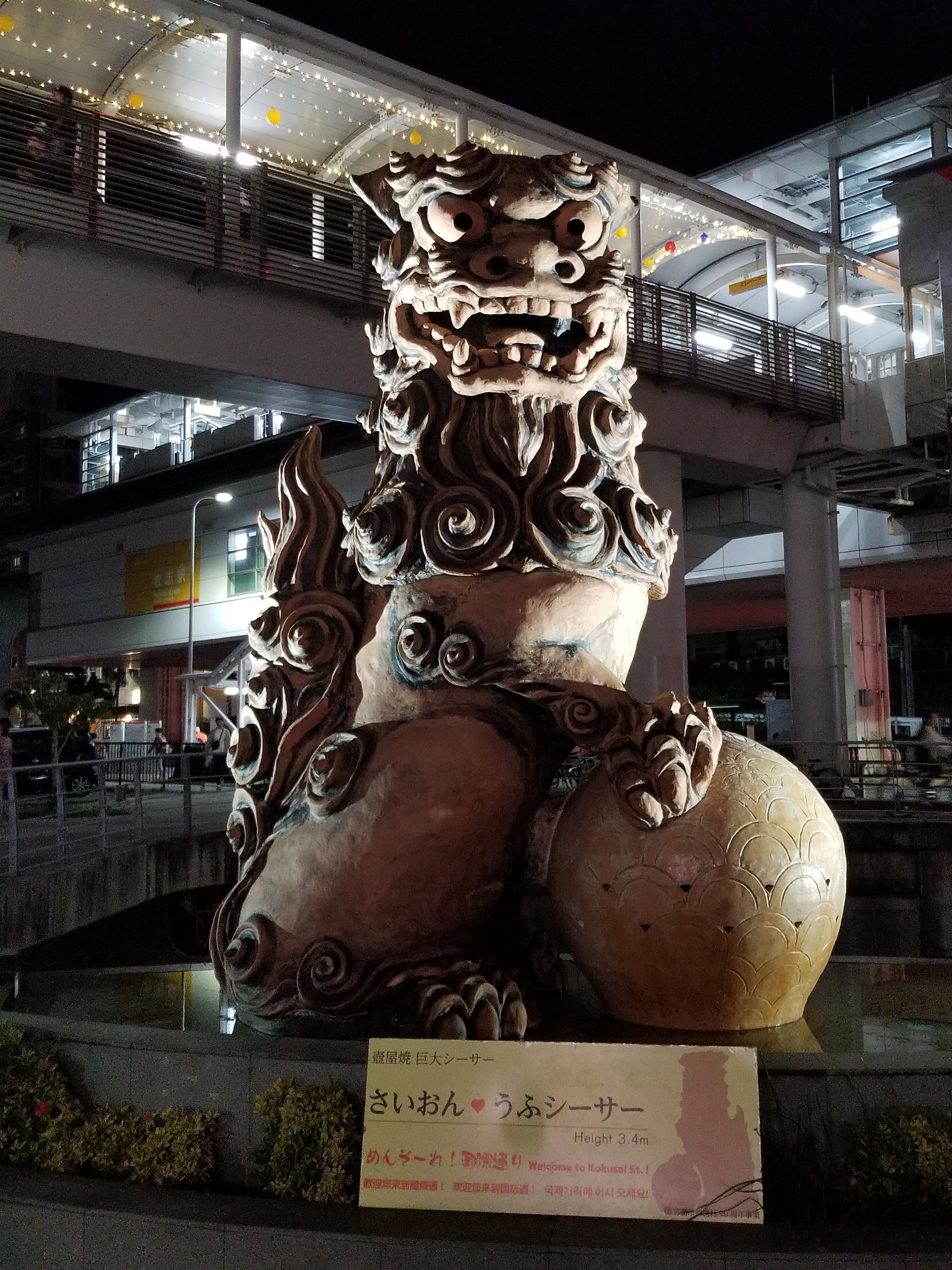
Saion Ufu Shisa in Naha

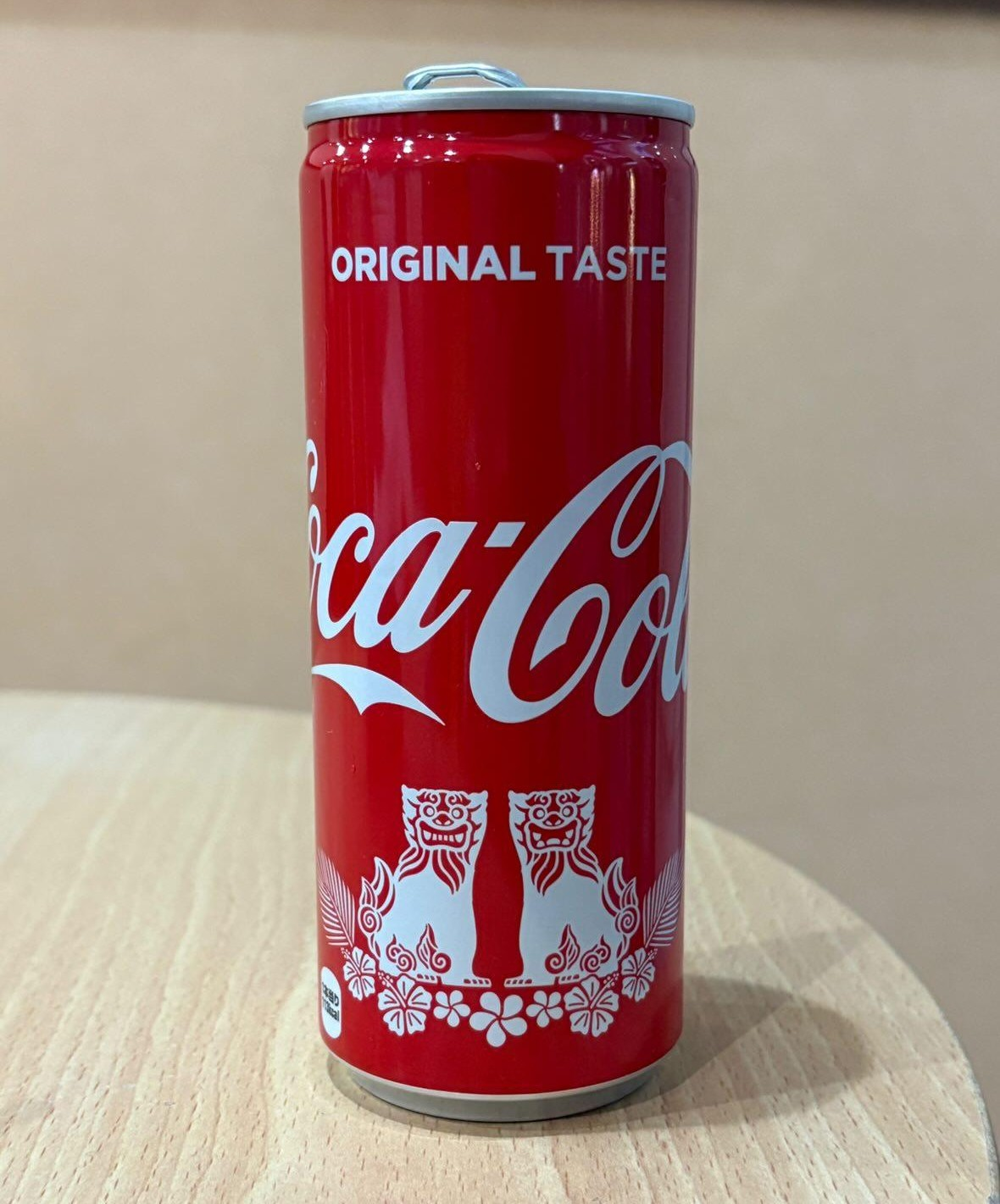
Shisa on a Coca-Cola can from Okinawa

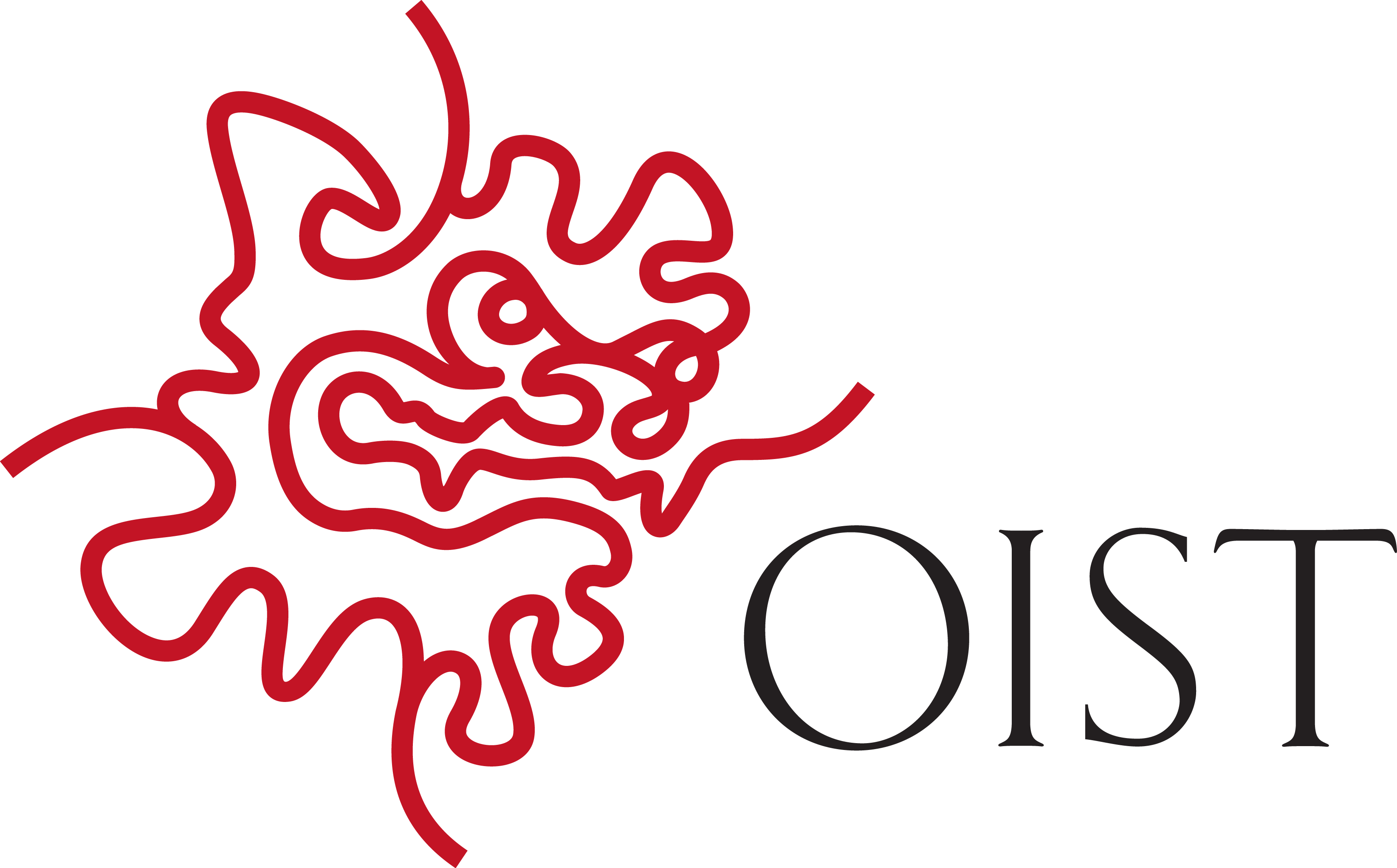
The Okinawa Institute of Science and Technology uses a stylised Shisa as its logo.

Stylised image of a shisa

== See also ==
- Carranca, boat figurehead used in Brazil
- Chinese art
- Chinese guardian lions
- Chinese mythology in popular culture
- Japanese sculpture
- King Caesar, originally King Shisa, a kaiju from the Godzilla film series, inspired by the shisa
- Komainu, lion-like statues used in Shinto shrines
- Seasarmon
- Tutelary
- Qilin
