= Gargoyle (monster) =

Fantasy creature inspired by the architectural element

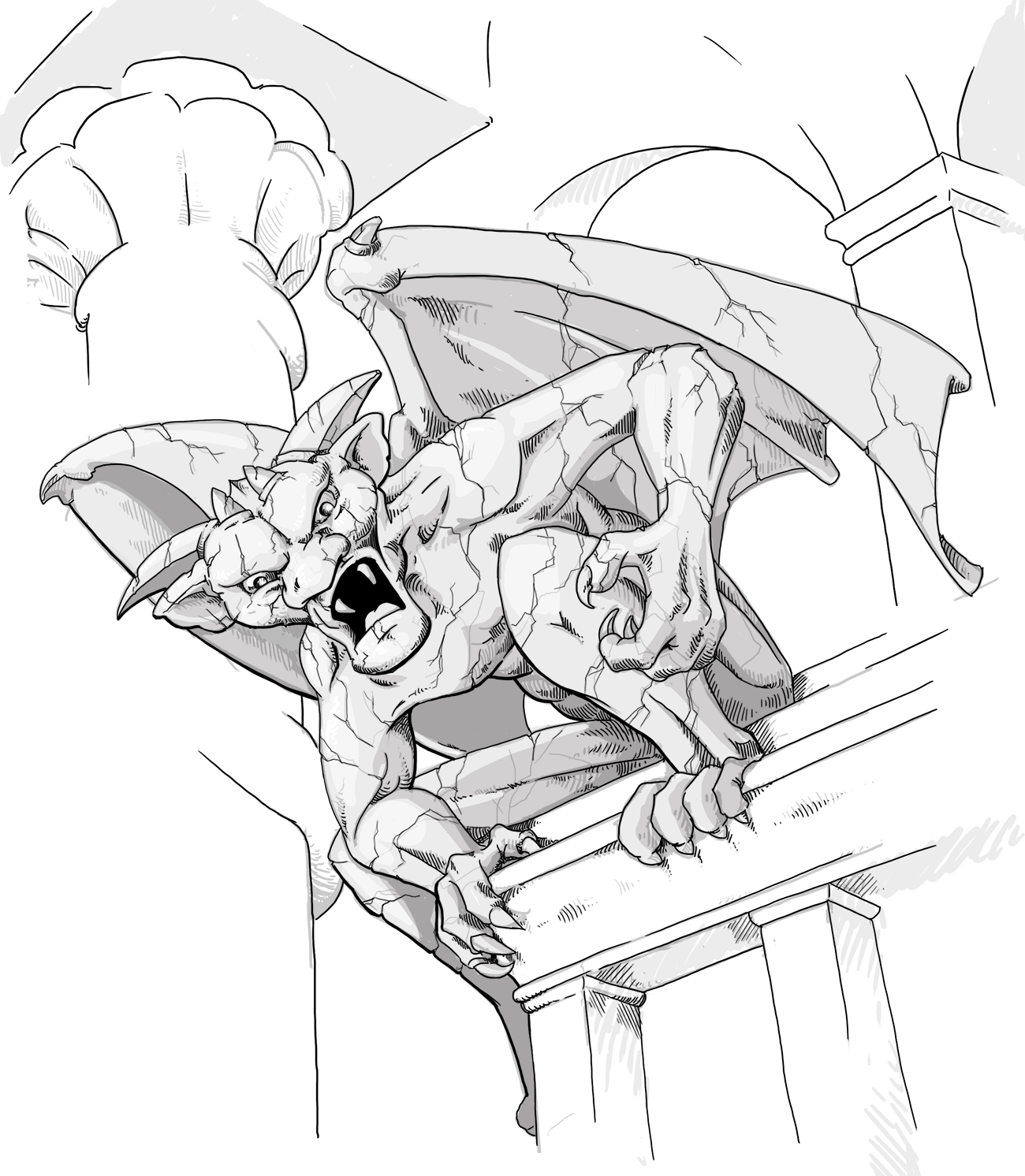
A gargoyle monster as depicted in the tabletop RPG Dungeons & Dragons

The gargoyle is a fantasy and horror monster inspired by the appearance of bestial grotesque statues in architecture – particularly those sculpted to decorate the cathedral of Notre-Dame de Paris during its 19th-century reconstruction, rather than actual medieval statuary. Its name is based on the gargoyle architectural element, whose name is often incorrectly conflated with that of monstrous grotesques as a whole.

While they were believed in mythology to frighten away evil spirits, the idea of such statues physically coming to life is a more recent notion. Like golems, they are usually made of magically animated or transformed stone, but have animal or chimera traits and are often guardians of a place such as a cathedral or castle. They can also be depicted as vessels for demonic possession or as a living species resembling statues. Most fictional gargoyles throughout the 20th century have been evil creatures and horror villains, but the notion of gargoyles as heroic defenders gained popularity in the 1990s following the animated series Gargoyles, and it is now not uncommon to see them depicted as sympathetic characters who may work together with humans.

== Etymology and folklore ==
The word gargoyle derives from the Old French gargouille ("throat"), an onomatopoeic root imitating the gurgling of water. In architecture, a gargoyle is a functional waterspout designed to divert rainwater clear of a wall. A similar decorative figure without a spout is properly termed a grotesque.

According to medieval French legend, Saint Romanus subdued a water-spouting dragon named La Gargouille near Rouen. After the beast was burned, its unburnable head was mounted on the cathedral wall to repel evil spirits, serving as a folkloric explanation for the architectural carvings.

== Description ==
=== As evil constructs ===
The notion of gargoyles as supernatural constructs brought to life by evil was introduced in Maker of Gargoyles (1932), a short pulp fiction story by Clark Ashton Smith where Reynard, a medieval stonemason, unconsciously infuses his hate and lust into two gargoyles that attack the town of Vyones and later kill him when he attempts to destroy them. The device belongs to a wider literary tradition of the animated statue, which reaches back to the classical myth of Pygmalion and the golem of folklore, in which inert sculpture is granted life.

=== As demonic vessels ===
The notion of gargoyles as demonic vessels was introduced in The Horn of Vapula (Lewis Spence, 1932), in which a demon familiar is bound into a horned and goatlike gargoyle. Gargoyles may also appear as vessels for formerly human souls, such as the Marvel Comics hero Gargoyle, who later is able to transform back into a human.

=== Friendly gargoyles ===
The notion of a friendly gargoyle was used by the Disney show Gargoyles (1994–1997) in which gargoyles protect humanity as part of their nature. It originates from the folk belief, recorded in the legend of La Gargouille, of gargoyles as protectors that ward evil away from the buildings they adorn.

== See also ==
- Carranca
- Gargouille
- Grotesque (architecture)
- Hunky punk
- Sheela na gig
