= Onigawara =

Roof sculptures in Japanese architecture

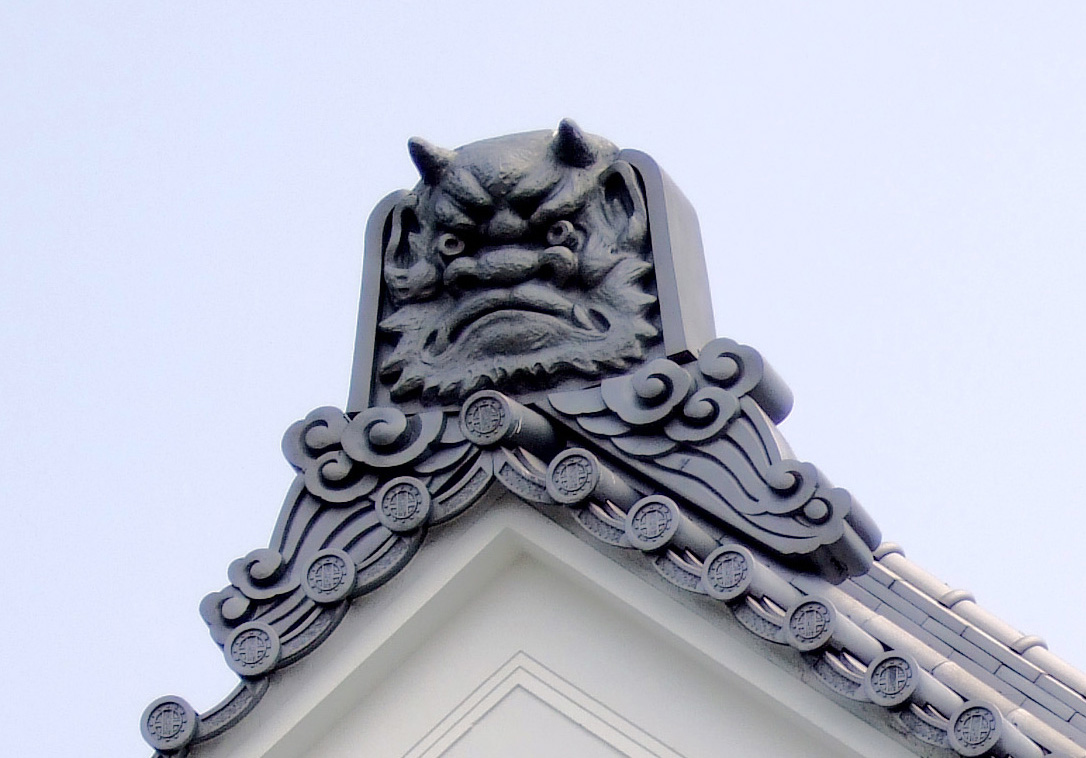
Onigawara on the roof of Tokyo University of the Arts

Onigawara (鬼瓦; Japanese pronunciation: [o.ɲi.ɡaꜜ.wa.ɾa, -ŋaꜜ-], lit. 'ogre tile') are a type of roof ornamentation found in Japanese architecture. They are generally roof tiles or statues depicting an oni (ogre) or a fearsome beast. Onigawara were historically found on Buddhist temples, but are now used in many traditionally styled buildings. Some tiles may depict things besides oni, but are still called onigawara due to custom.

== History ==
Prior to the Heian period, similar ornaments with floral and plant designs (hanagawara) preceded the onigawara. The present design is thought to have come from a previous architectural element, the oni-ita, which is a board painted with the face of an oni and was meant to stop roof leaks. During the Nara period the tile was decorated with other motifs, but later it acquired distinct ogre-like features and became strongly tridimensional.

== Gallery ==
Oni depictions

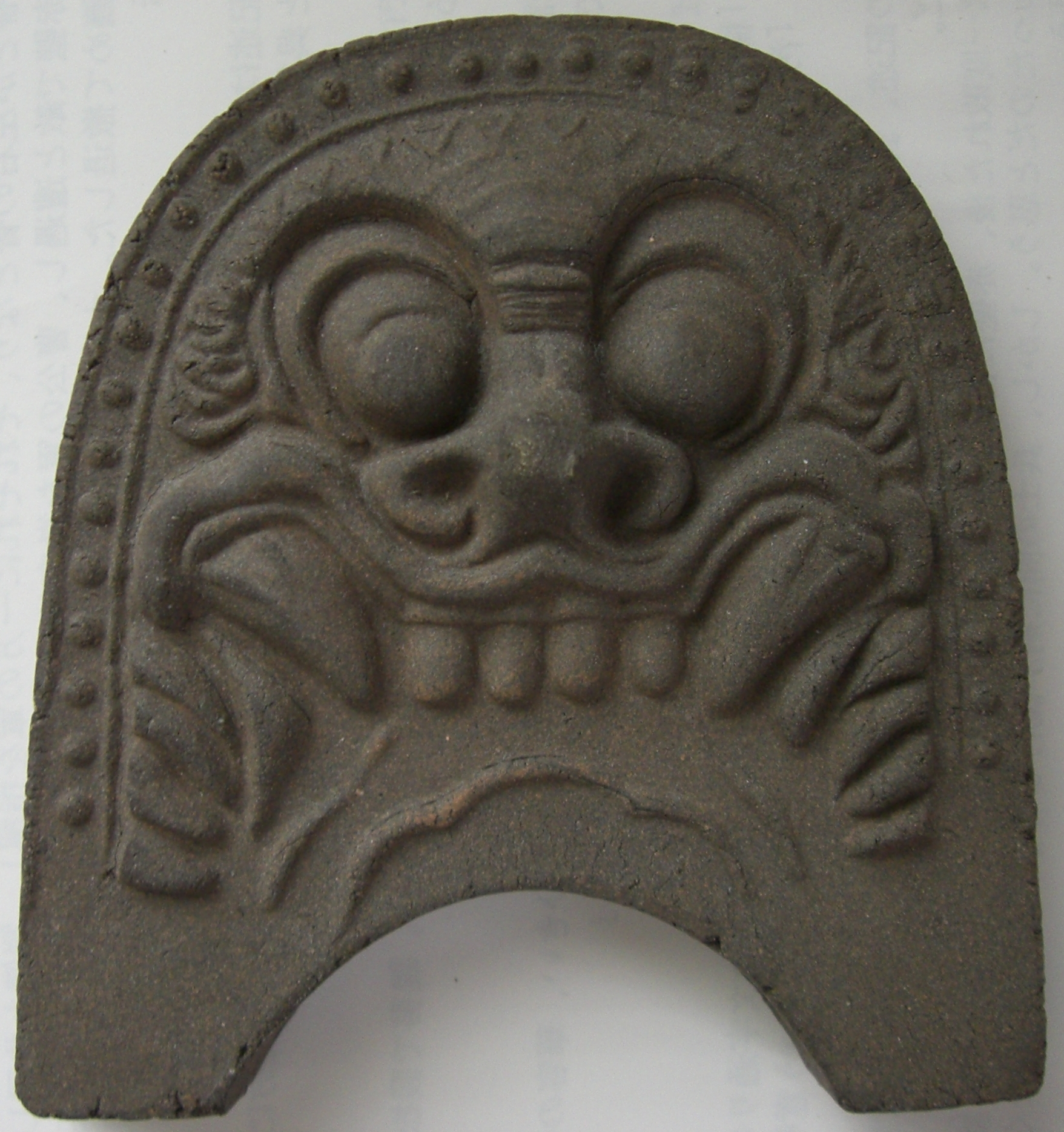
From the ruins of the old Horyu-ji Temple (8th century CE)

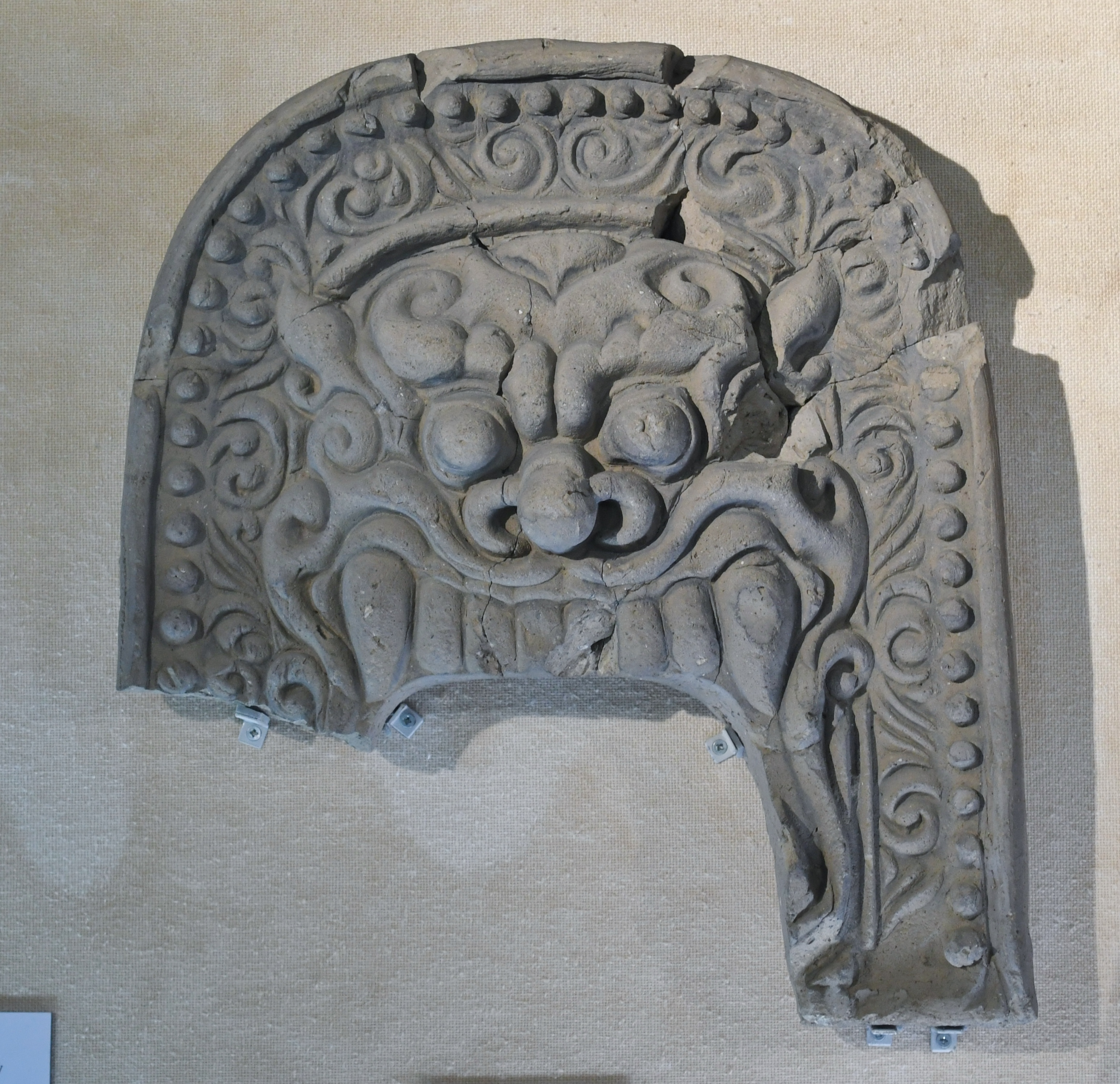
From the ruins of Heian Palace (8th–13th century CE)

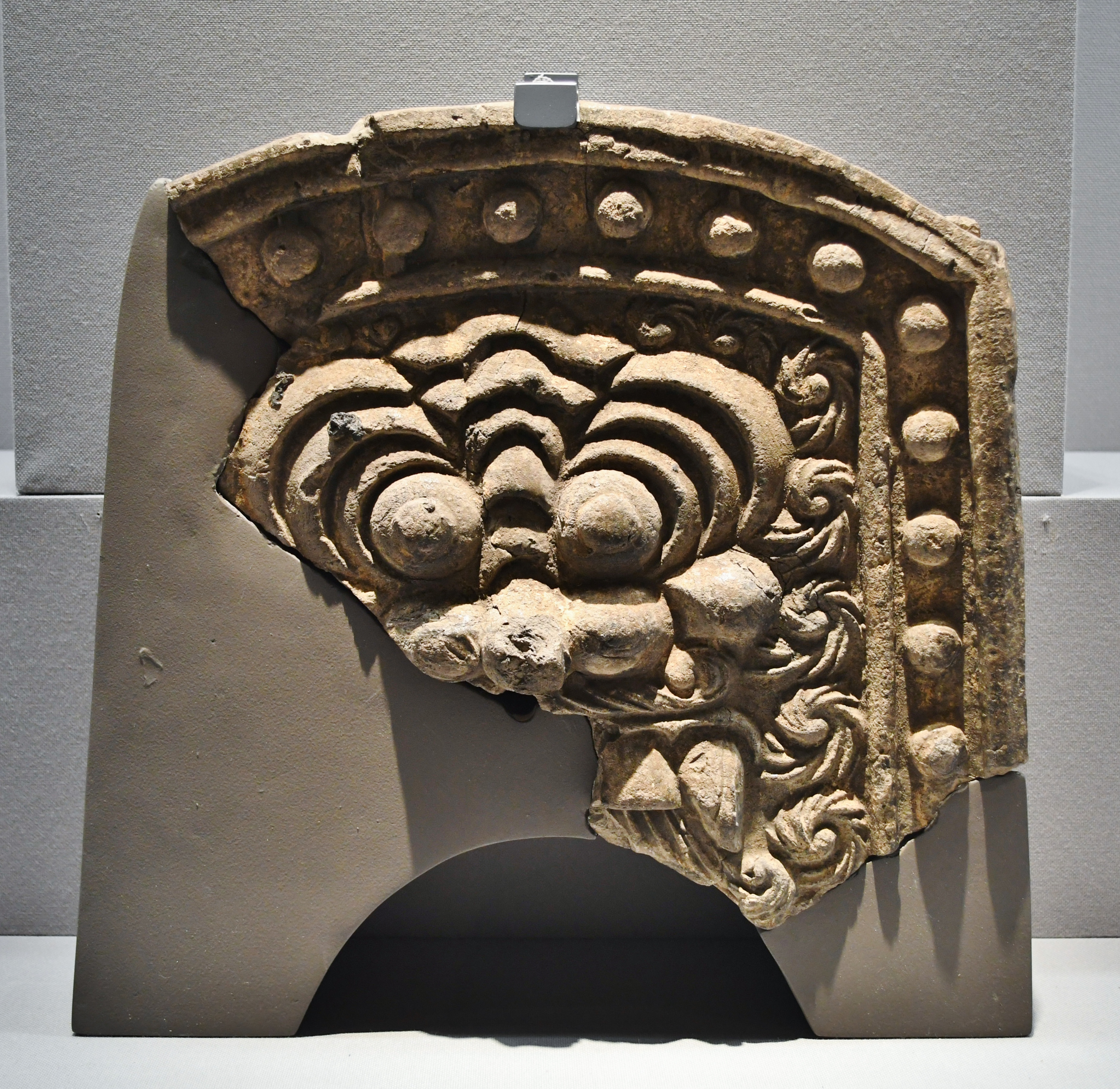
From the ruins of Shimotsuke Kokubun-ji Temple (8th–10th century CE)

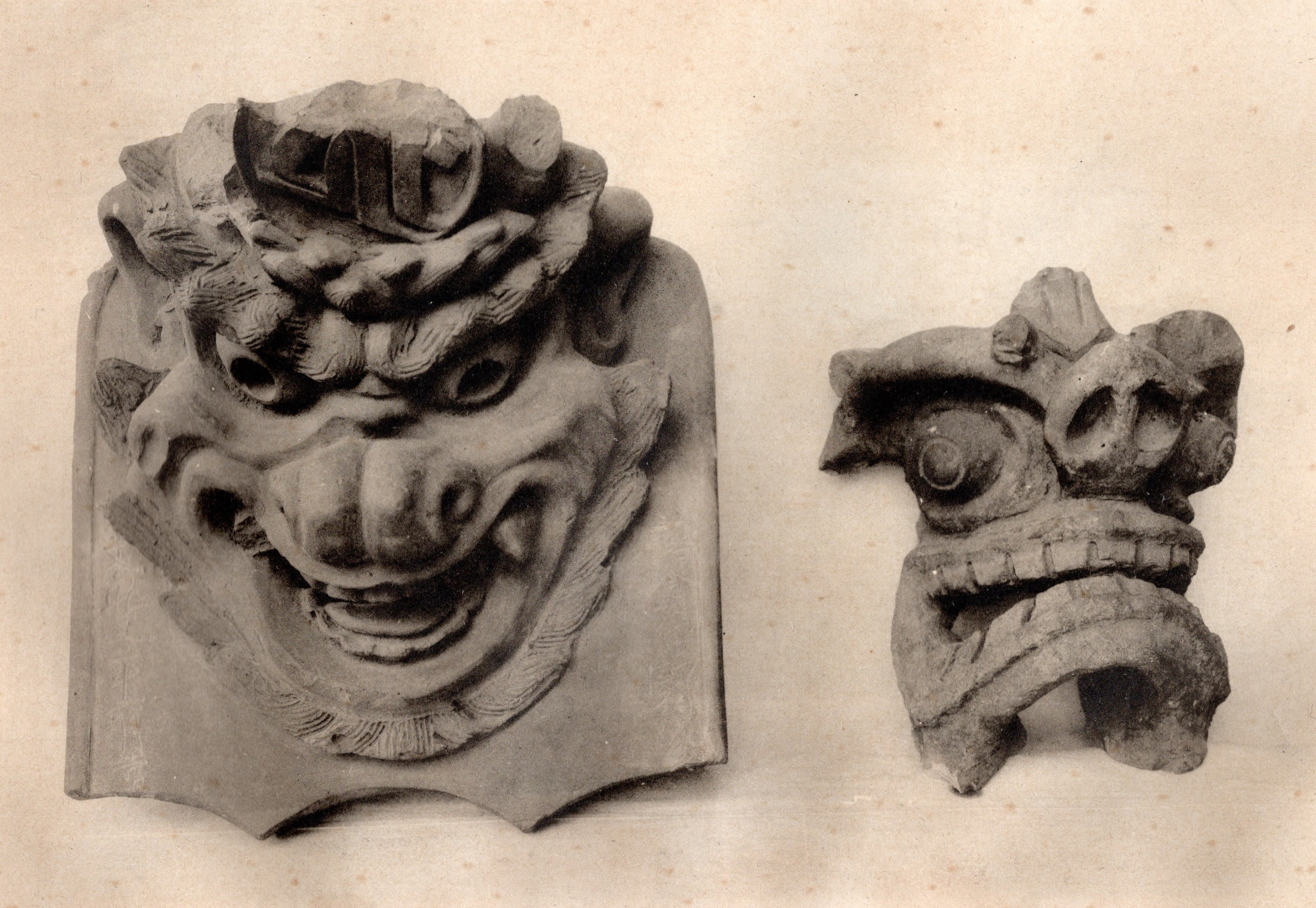
From the ruins of Yahashira Shrine (1504 CE)

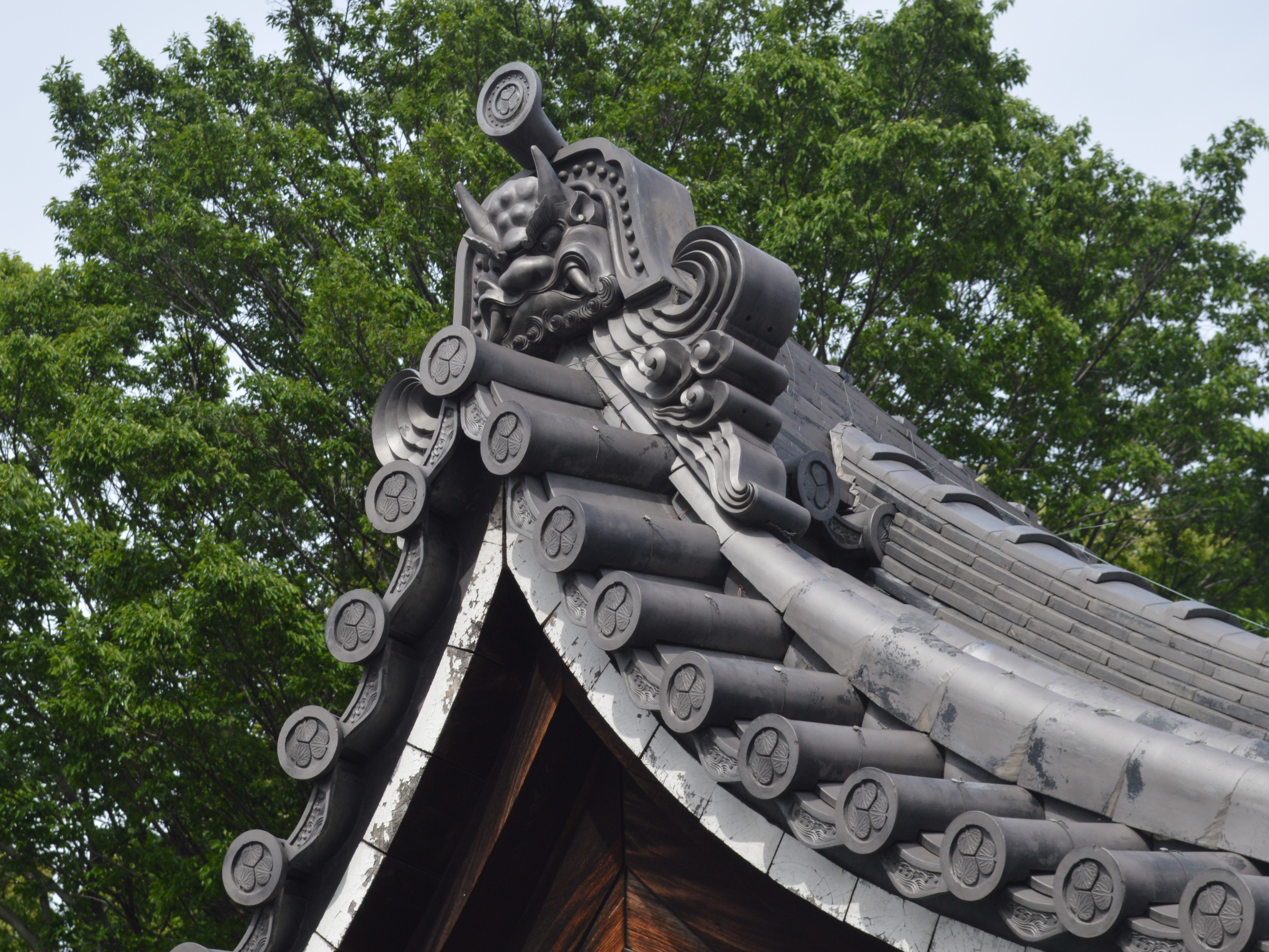

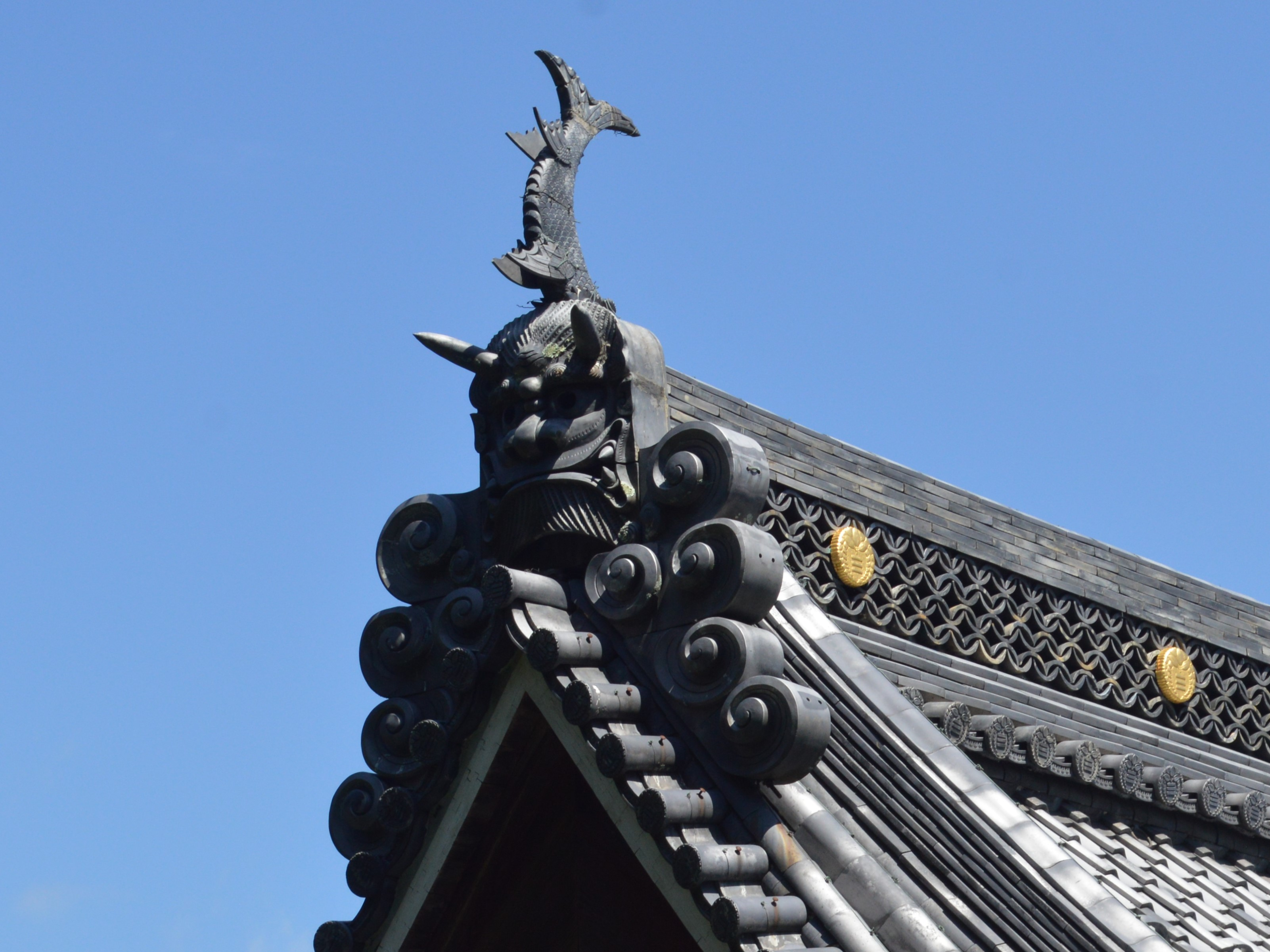

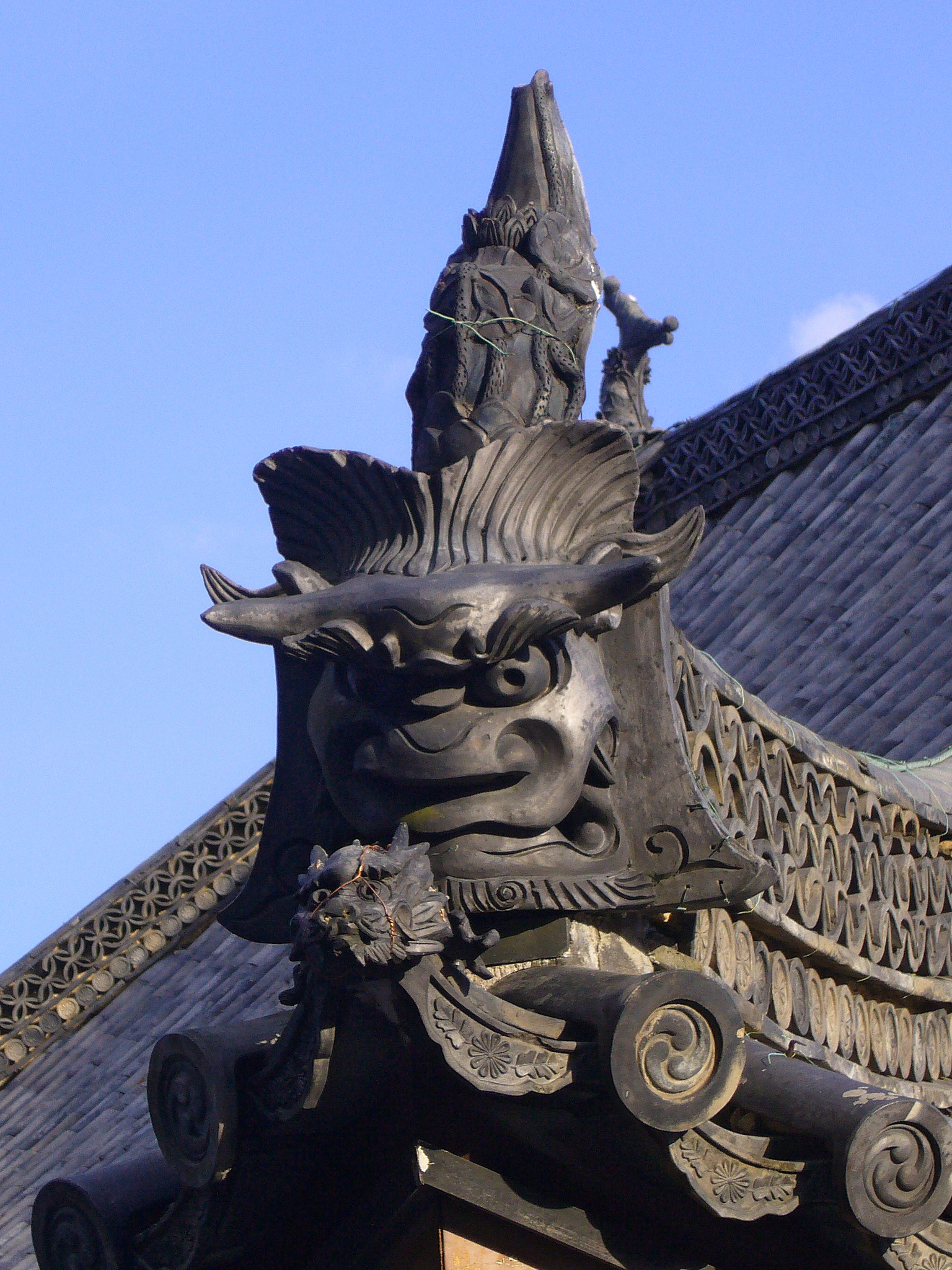

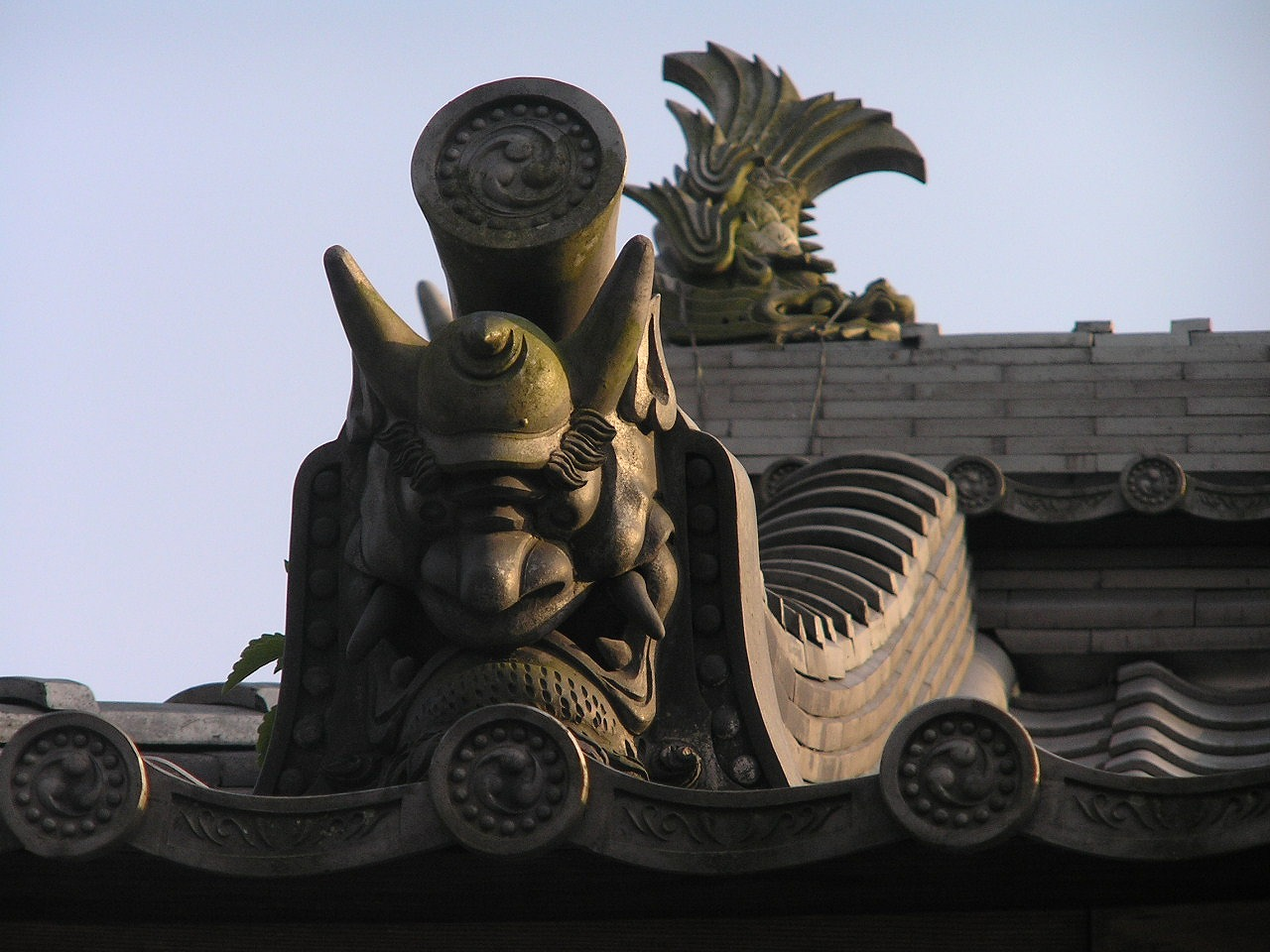
Jōdo-ji

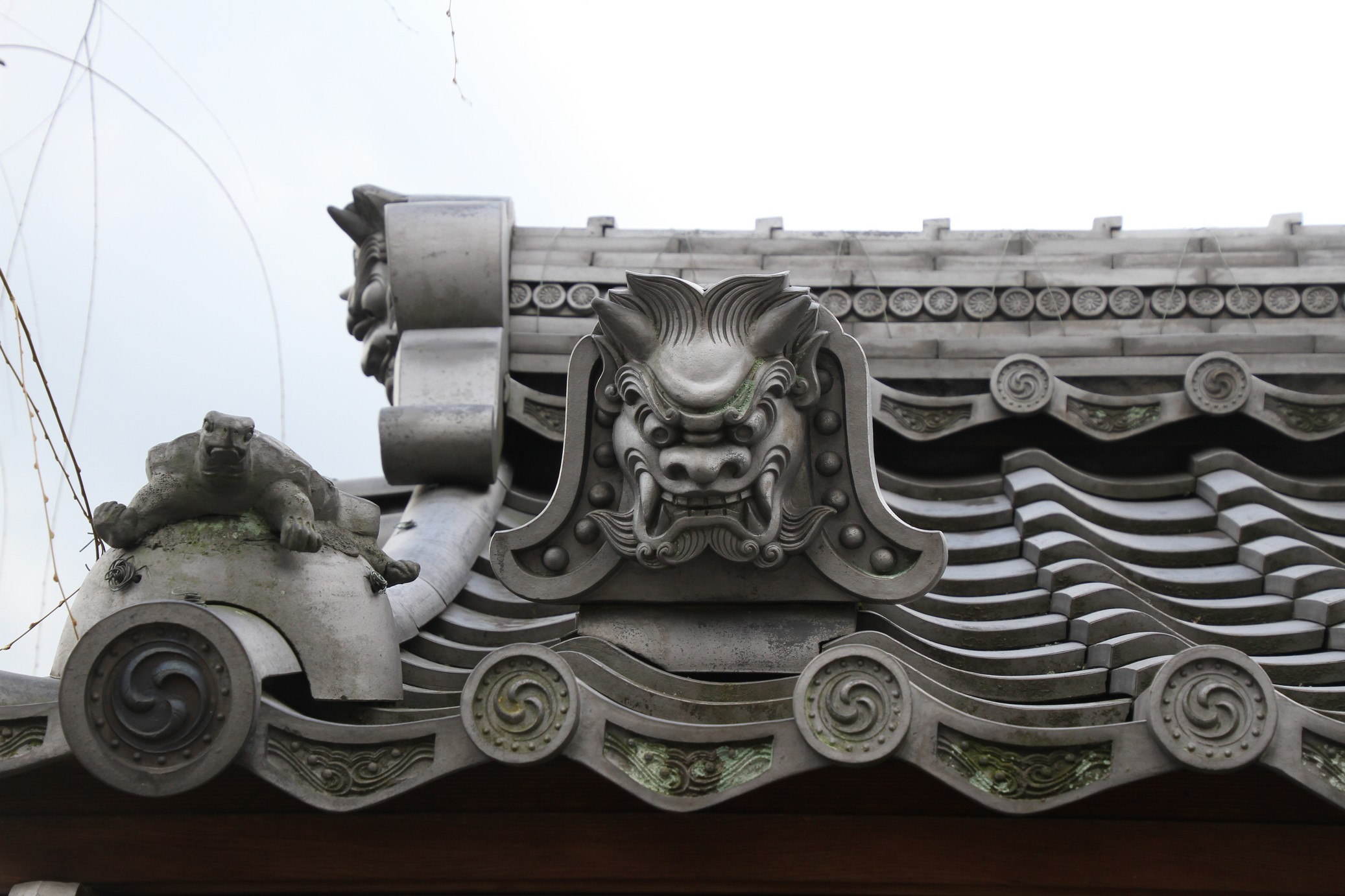

Other depictions

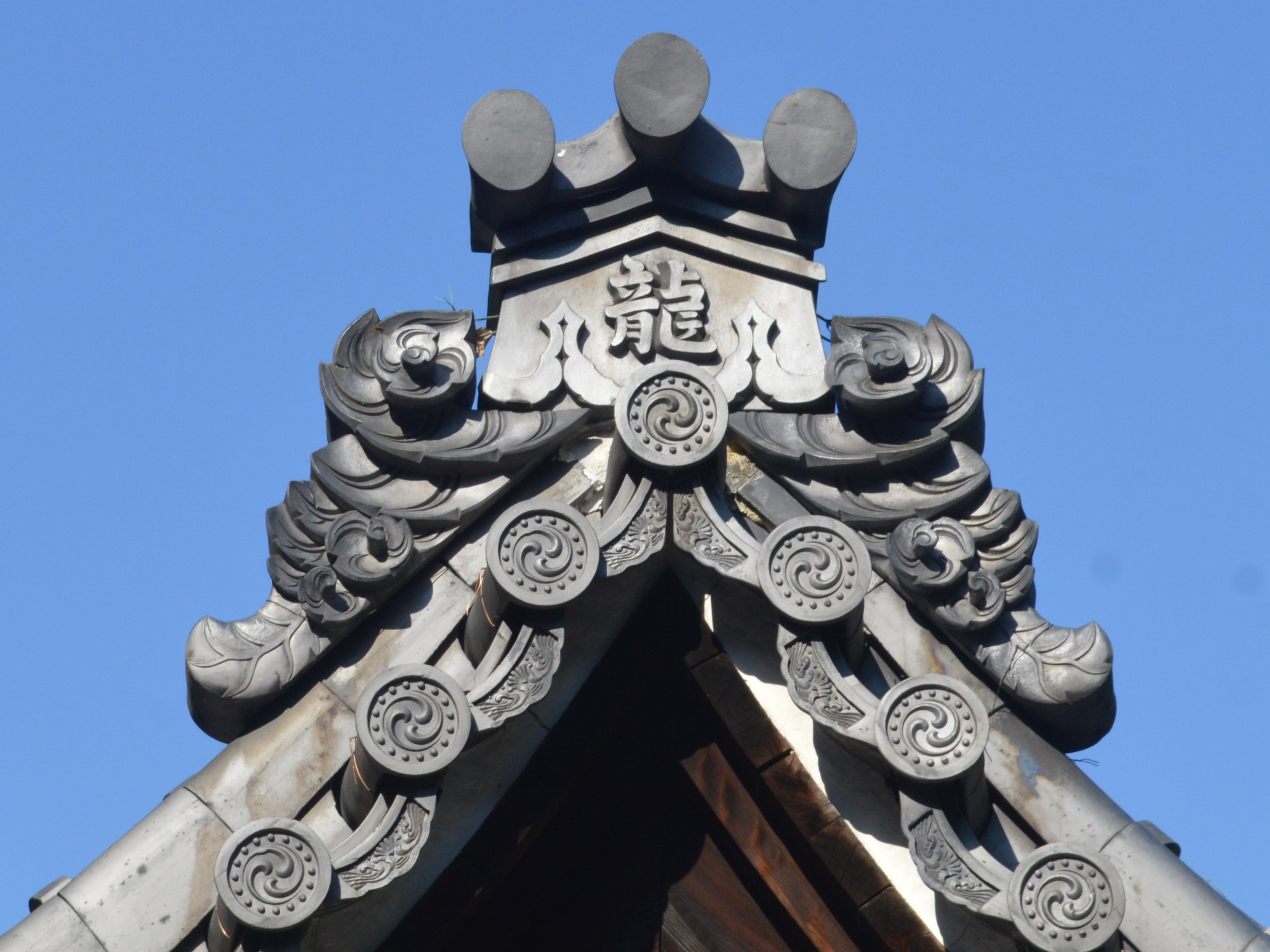

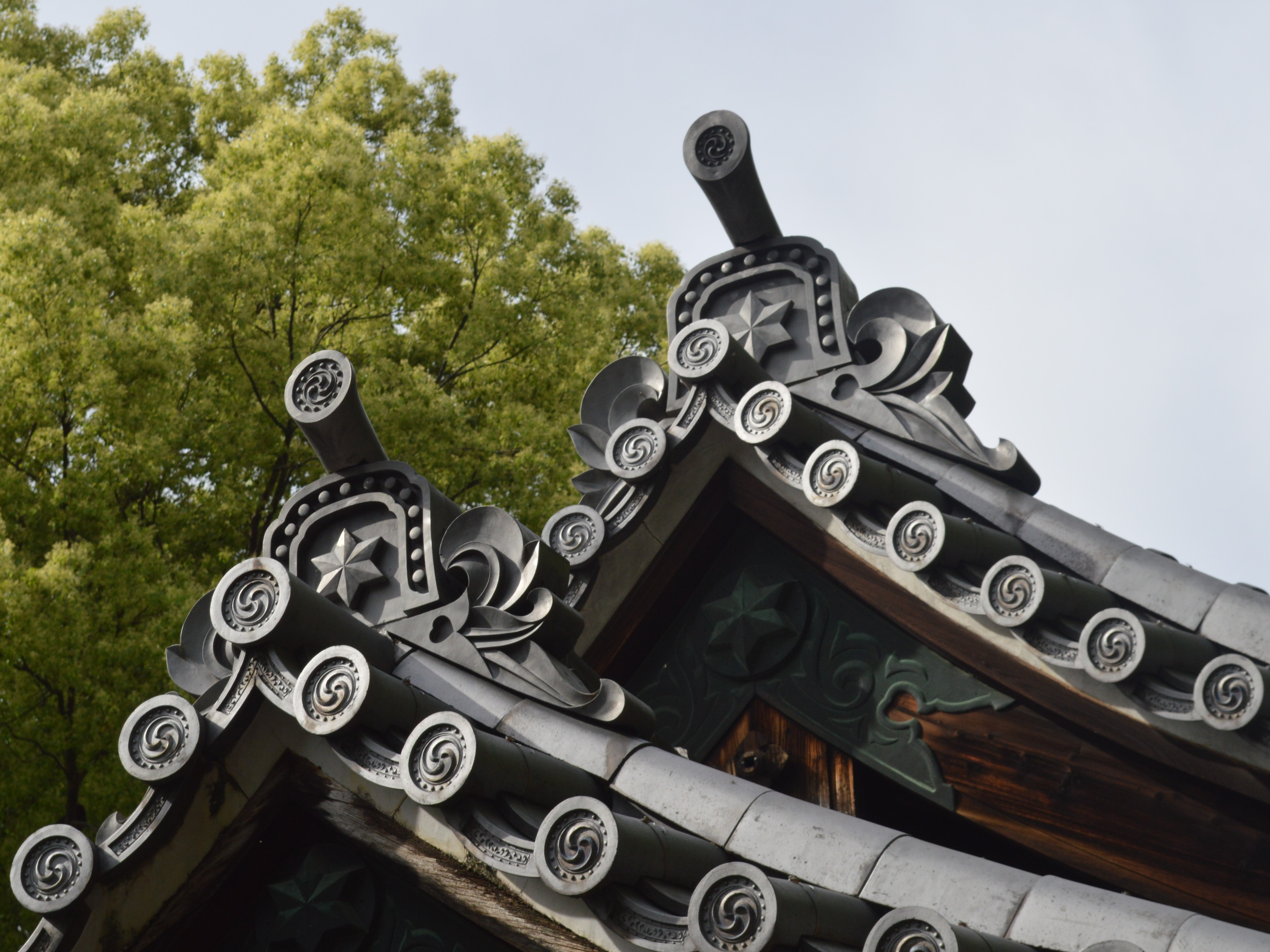

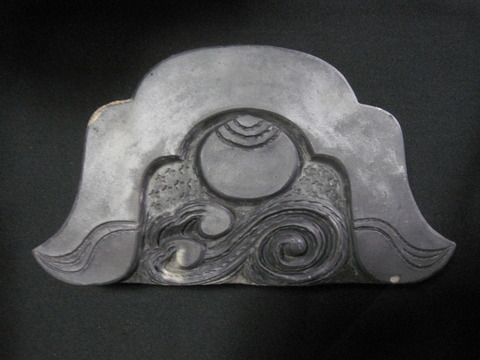
Cintamani

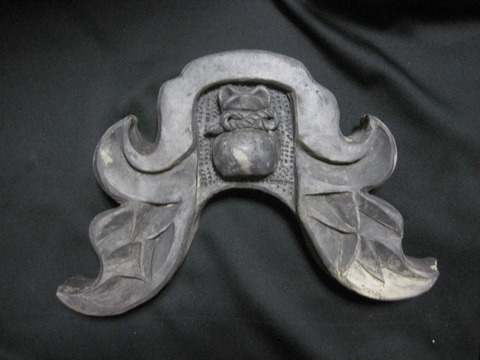
Kinchaku

== See also ==
- Chimera (architecture)
- Gargoyle
- Imperial roof decoration
- Japanese architecture
- Jisaburō Ozawa, an admiral nicknamed "Onigawara" by his men
- Shachihoko
- Shibi (roof tile)
- Shisa
- List of Traditional Crafts of Japan
