= Carranca =

Figurehead attached to river craft in Brazil

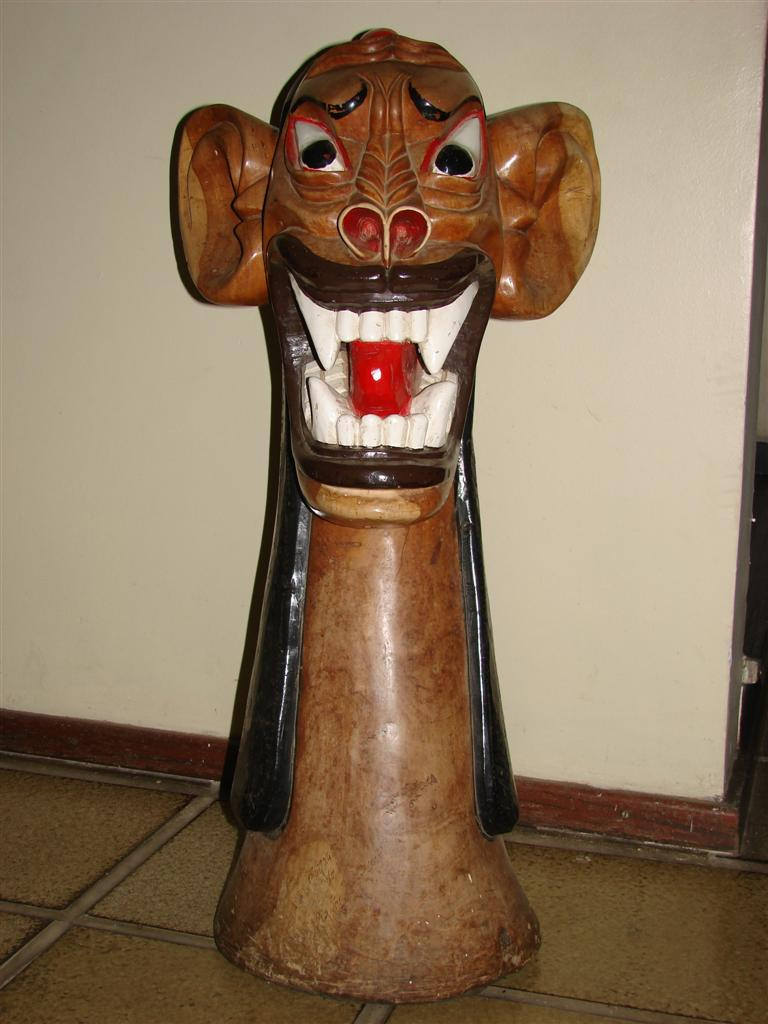
Modern carranca

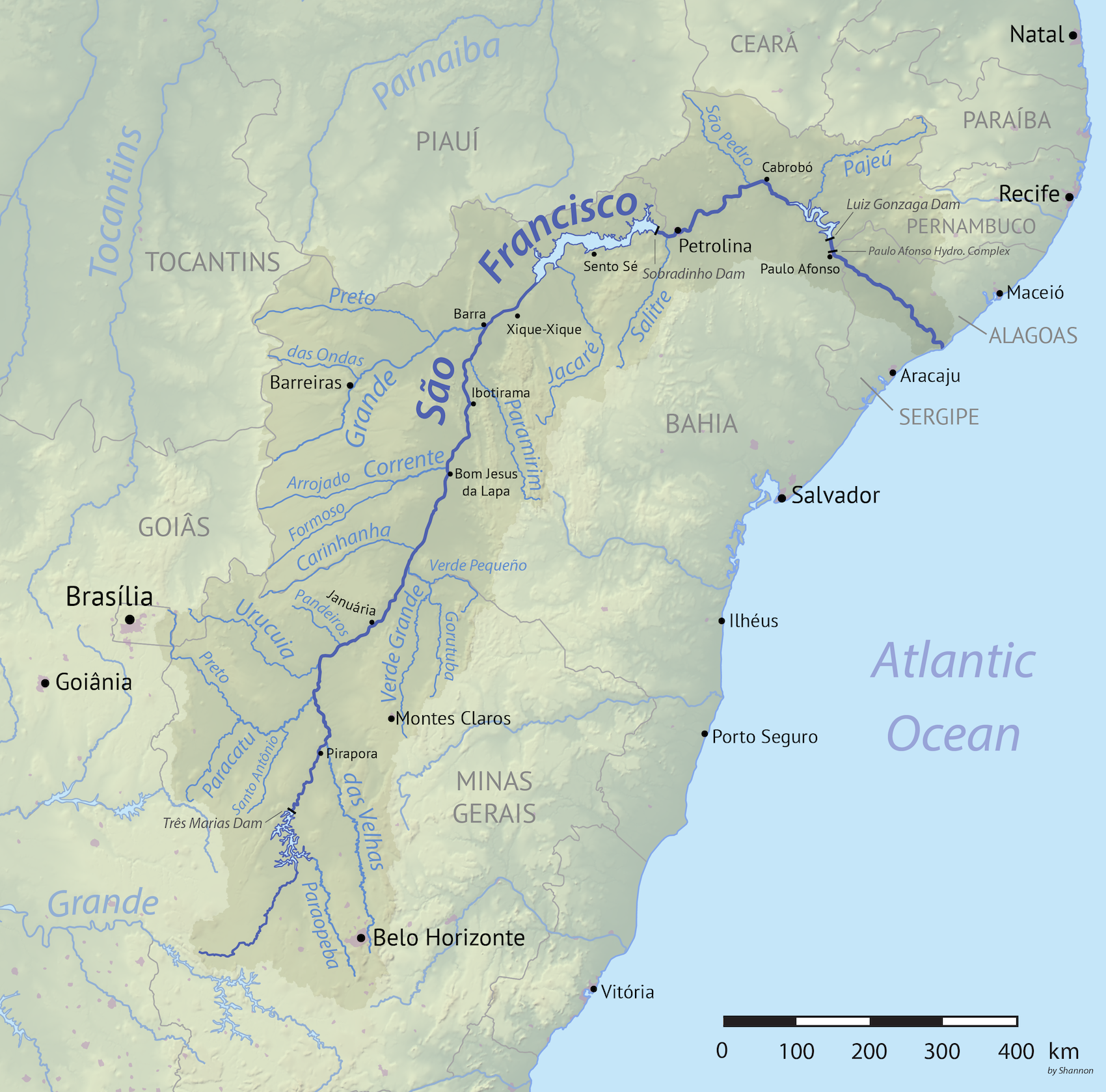
Rio São Francisco

A carranca (Portuguese, literally "scowl" with another definition as "figurehead"; Portuguese pronunciation: [kaˈʁɐ̃kɐ]) is a type of figurehead attached to river craft which is attributed with power to protect the boatmen from the river's evil spirits. The culture in Brazil incorporated elements of the indigenous culture, so that the idea of river spirits and forest spirits can help or hinder a crossing is also natural of the Amerindian imaginary. They were once commonly found on the lower Rio São Francisco in Brazil's Northeast Region (Nordeste). The carranca is most commonly a figure of a human or an animal. They were used to identify traders operating on the São Francisco and, as with ancient figureheads, serve the superstitious as guardians on the river.

Today most authentic carrancas and early folk art revivals are only found in museums with some being subject of a Rio exhibition in 2002. Four historic examples are featured on the front of the home of Roberto Burle Marx, now the National Monument, Sítio Roberto Burle Marx.

Modern, more stylized versions are sometimes seen as decorations in restaurants or homes and commonly seen in tourist shops of the states of Bahia, Pernambuco, Sergipe and Alagoas where the historic use was found on the lower Rio São Francisco. These range from key chain figures up to very large ones a meter or more in height and made from large tree trunks. Many, if not most of those are in the carranca-vampiro style rather than the classic boat figurehead styles of the past. The difference may be seen by comparing the photos of classic styles compared to the tourist versions pictured on this page.

Classic figurehead versions, dating from the early 19th or even late 18th centuries, were painted, frequently chalk white with black hair, gaping red mouths and white fangs. The most common tourist versions follow similar schemes. A more modern, decorative unpainted version is often in natural wood and even polished.

While most of the modern tourist versions are produced quickly in quantity using one of several patterns a few are made by more artistic wood workers and show unique design or interpretations of "functional" carrancas from history. A very few of these are "museum quality" folk art displayed in folk art museums of Brazil.

== See also ==
- Figurehead (object)
- Grotesque (architecture)
