= Grotesque (architecture) =

Fantastic or mythical figure used as architectural element

- Chimera, Chimerae
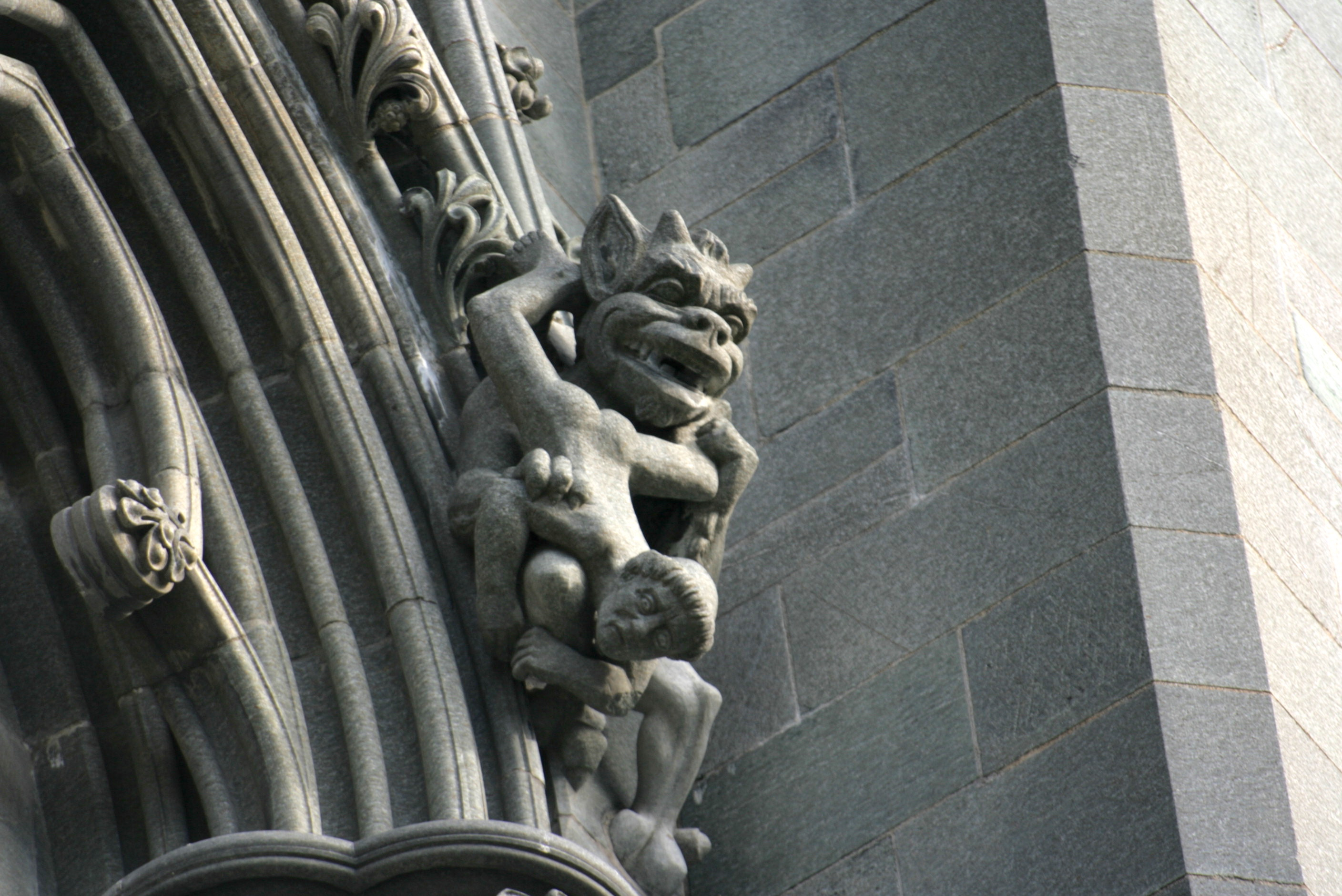
- Grotesque on Nidaros Cathedral, Trondheim
- Architectural style: Gothic style

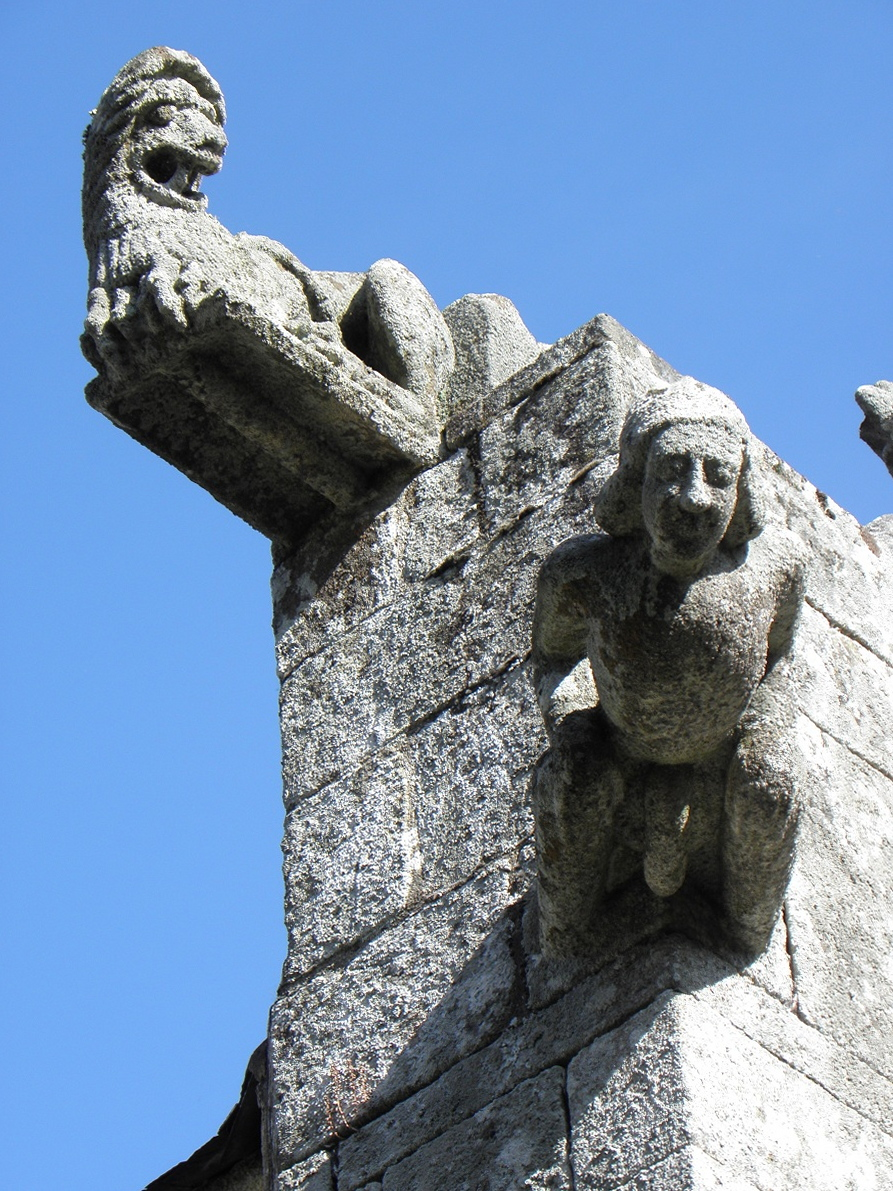
Grotesques on a church in Gouézec, France

In architecture, a grotesque (/ɡroʊˈtɛsk/) is a fantastic or mythical figure carved from stone and fixed to the walls or roof of a building. A chimera (/kaɪˈmɪərə/) is a type of grotesque depicting a mythical combination of multiple animals (sometimes including humans). Grotesque are often called gargoyles, although the term gargoyle refers to figures carved specifically to drain water away from the sides of buildings. In the Middle Ages, the term babewyn was used to refer to both gargoyles and chimerae. This word is derived from the Italian word babbuino, which means "baboon".

Grotesques often depict whimsical, mythical creatures in dramatic or humorous ways. They have historically been a key element of architecture in many periods including the Renaissance and Medieval periods and have stylistically developed in conjunction with these times. Although grotesques typically depict a wide range of subjects, they are often hybrids of different mythical, human, and animalistic features.

Many scholars describe grotesques as being used to ward off evil and as reminders of the separation of the earth and the divine. Grotesques are predominantly carved into buildings of religious significance, in particular churches and cathedrals. Despite their presence in religious spaces, their anthropomorphic designs are largely not directly religious and instead are often more whimsical without religious connotations. They commonly exist on high ledges and rooftops and are frequently positioned out of view from common areas. Prominent examples of preserved grotesques exist on buildings such as the Florence Cathedral and Notre-Dame de Paris. Historically, grotesques have also had significant design influence from sculptural trends and often their architects were originally sculptors or artists. This meant that the widespread emergence of grotesques also often converged with popular art styles that existed at the time, especially the combined rise of the gothic style and the addition of grotesques in architecture. Key architects that often included grotesques as a feature in their designs included Brunelleschi and Gundulf of Rochester.

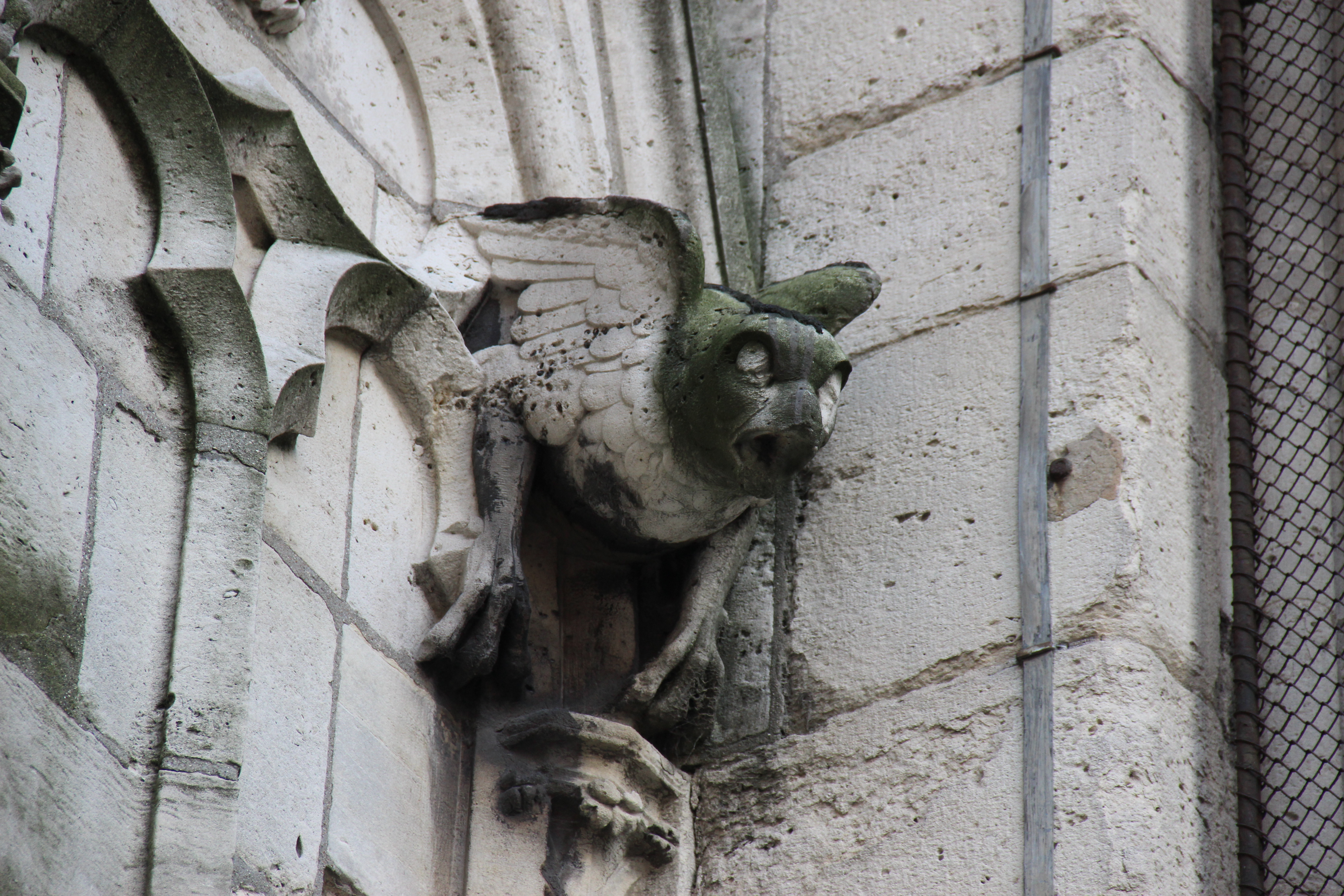
Grotesque at Notre-Dame Cathedral

Bridaham, in his book Gargoyles, Chimeres, and the Grotesque in French Gothic Sculpture, pointed out that the sculptors of the gothic cathedrals in the twelfth and thirteenth centuries were tasked by the Pope to be "preacher[s] in stone" to the illiterates who populated Europe at the time. It fell to the sculptors not only to present the stories of the Bible but also to portray the animals and beings who populated the folklore of the times. Many of these showed up as grotesques.

Some critics, such as Frances Barasch, dismissed the use of the grotesque as an idle toy and not of any great use. They also argued that it perpetuated superstition instead of articulating what is real or the truth.

The meaning and use of the grotesque is also changing in architecture. Aside from the sculpture, for instance, the term has been used to describe the search for the abnormal or the representation of caricature. There are also scholars who use the architectural definition of grotesque as a term for disharmony. This include Peter Eisenman, a Jewish Deconstructivist architect who used this conceptualization in his work. Particularly, he used the term in presenting a stylistic opposition to the form of aesthetics that is identified with the Kantian notion of the sublime in architecture.

== History of grotesques in architecture ==
Grotesques in architecture can be traced back to its origins in medieval architecture, however they rose to prominence in Renaissance building design becoming more whimsical and elaborate during this time. Originally designed as spouts to drain water from buildings and gutters, now called gargoyles, grotesques became a sculptural feature during the medieval period and their often-intricate designs developed alongside the gothic architecture period that took place in Europe from the 12th to the 16th century establishing a basis for the common features of grotesque designs. The earliest examples of grotesques in architecture exist at historic sites such as the Salisbury Cathedral. The earliest instances of grotesques in architecture were initially deeply intertwined with religious spaces. The architect of buildings such as the Salisbury Cathedral was a monk, contributing to the rising interest of grotesques upon religious buildings. Even after their establishment as a key feature of early medieval architecture they continued to be based in religious circumstances even up until the Renaissance period almost 500 years later. Even in these early examples of grotesques in architecture there are clear mythological influences, and their whimsical style was established early on. Grotesques in architecture are most found on religious buildings and in religious contexts. Historically grotesques in architecture existed to amplify the traditionally dull waterspouts that existed on buildings throughout the Medieval and Renaissance time periods. Many practicing sculptors such as Brunelleschi would later venture into architecture in their careers and bring with them their knowledge and understanding of sculpture and design, contributing to the growing number of grotesques that were designed and executed in architecture.

== Renaissance architecture ==
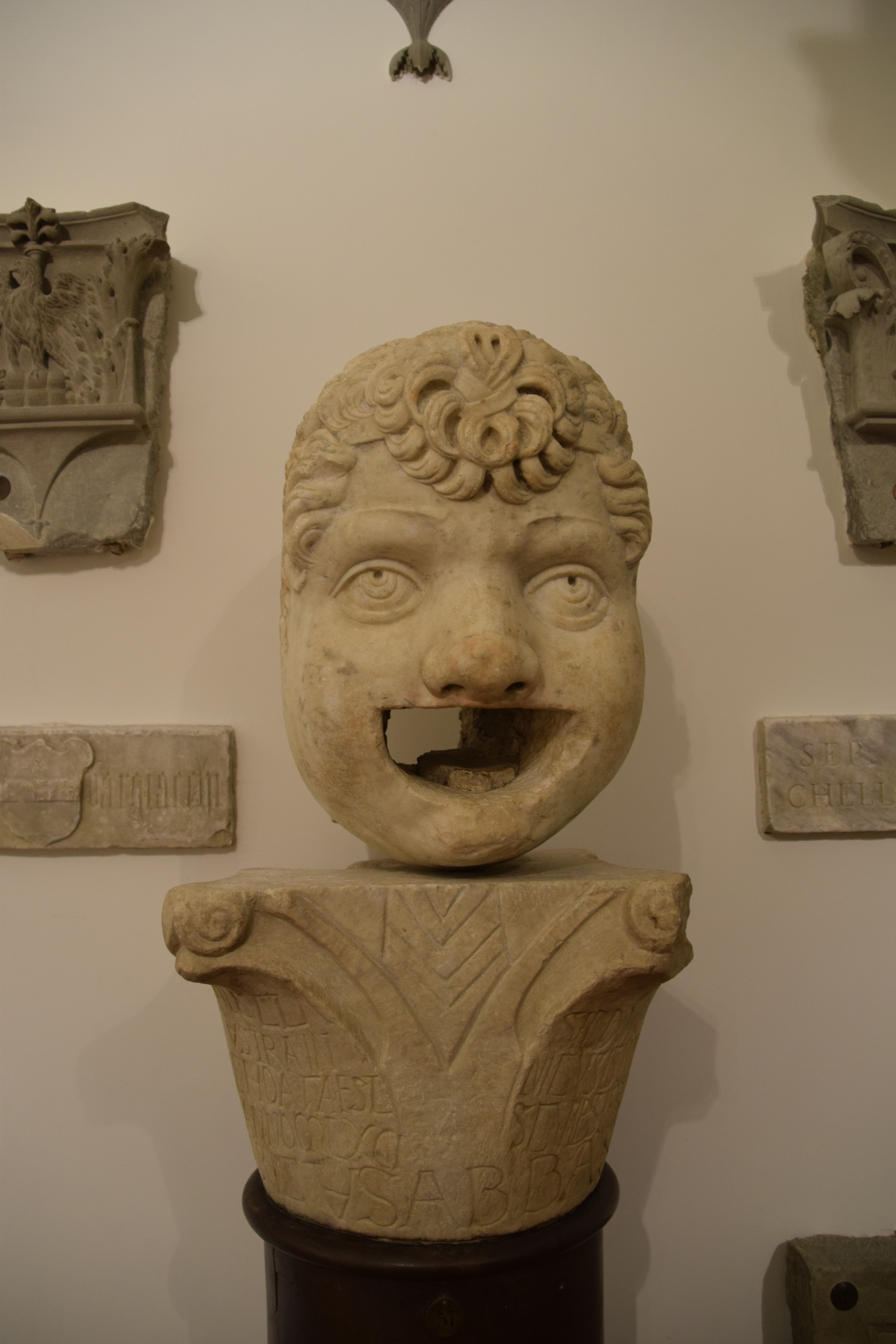
Grotesque made for the Florence Cathedral, now held at The Museo dell'Opera del Duomo, Florence

Grotesques were a key feature of architecture and landscape design in the Renaissance period. Grotesques rose to prominence in the 14th century as a popular architectural feature on churches and other buildings of religious importance. They remained a staple of Renaissance architecture until the end of the period in the 17th century, expanding from a staple feature of Renaissance architecture into a key aspect of Renaissance landscape design.

Many examples of grotesques are preserved on Renaissance buildings such as the Florence Cathedral. Grotesques in the Renaissance period are largely influenced by Renaissance styles that were prominent at the time. These included design features such as the separation of the practical and the stylised. This allowed grotesques to flourish as a key design feature on many Renaissance buildings as they became an element of the Renaissance aesthetic which became more important than their usefulness as decorative waterspouts.

The grotesques on Renaissance buildings such as the Sistine Chapel are examples of the decorative interpretations of grotesques that existed in the Renaissance period. Luke Morgan in The Monster in the Garden described the integral position that grotesques had aesthetically in Renaissance design and architecture. He described the use of grotesques in this time as not just sculptural but also a wider depiction of the massive art movement of grotesque imagery that was then occurring. Grotesque imagery in art in the Renaissance period with depictions of “monstrous births, hybrid creatures and legendary beasts” created a basis for the emerging style that would become the style of grotesques in architecture.

This developing architectural style drew heavily from artistic influences combining the rising public interest in myths and monsters into a sound architectural element in many Renaissance buildings. Similarly, architects in the Renaissance often started out as sculptors lending themselves to the rise in Grotesques created on buildings. This led to architects creating buildings that had the possibility of adding sculptural features such as the grotesques that sit atop them. This was the case with the architect Brunelleschi who designed the Cathedral of Santa Maria del Fiore. As he was previously an artist before becoming an architect, the grotesques and other sculptures that exist within the cathedral are a clear choice by him as a result his previous experience with sculpture.

== Medieval architecture ==
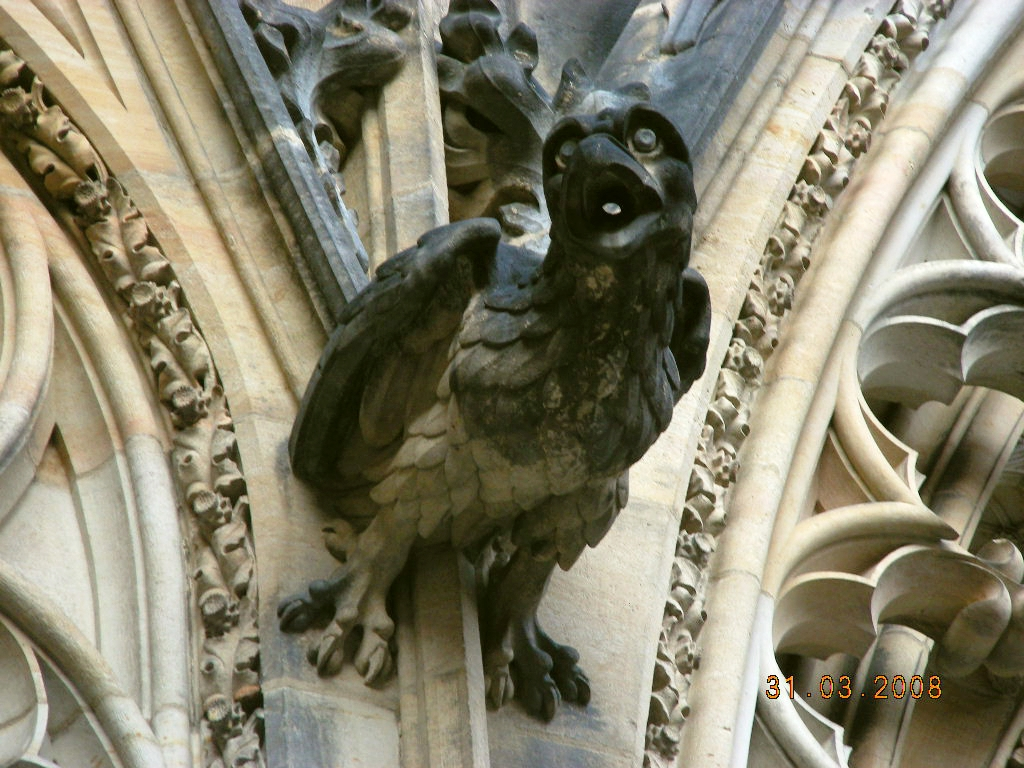
Grotesque on St. Vitus Cathedral, Prague

Grotesques also were a key feature of medieval architecture. As the Middle Ages were often referred to as “the age of faith,” religious institutions were hugely important and heavily decorated. Grotesques played a key role in this adding often humorous and subtly subversive touches to these institutions of faith.

Thomas A. Fudgé describes the importance of the inclusion of grotesques in medieval architecture in Medieval Religion and Its Anxieties. He highlights the deep importance that religious institutions had in this period, often reflected in the architecture of the time as churches stood out and loomed over entire towns. As a result, their decorative grotesques served to watch over entire towns acting not just as protectors but as watchful eyes for any potential acts of blasphemy.

Medieval sculpture also often depicted its subjects with a striking “moral transparency”, a key element of the gothic art that was emerging at the time. This concurrent sculptural depiction of good and evil saw a similar pattern emerge in the sculpting of grotesques at the time. Medieval art was governed by religious influences, hence the often mythical and whimsical depictions within architectural grotesques at the time.

Key examples of grotesques in medieval architecture include the grotesques adorning St Vitus Cathedral and Colegiata de San Pedro de Cervatos. The presence of grotesques in the medieval period was also marked by an increased interest to display personal character which quickly developed into the anthropomorphic style that has become a staple for the stone carvings. The distinct style of medieval grotesques is considered by G.R. Redgrave to be “the strange mixture of the sacred and the profane.”

Medieval grotesques were similarly influenced by prominent religious beliefs in Europe at the time and were featured heavily on churches and other religious buildings. Even architects in the medieval period were heavily influenced by the rise of Catholic Church at the time and the style of grotesques developed in tandem with this. Architects such as Gundulf of Rochester heavily influenced the rising style of grotesques on religious buildings. Previously a monk, Gundulf of Rochester went on to design some of the most prominent religious buildings in the Medieval era including Rochester Cathedral and with this established the use of grotesques as a staple on religious buildings such as churches.

== Architectural features ==
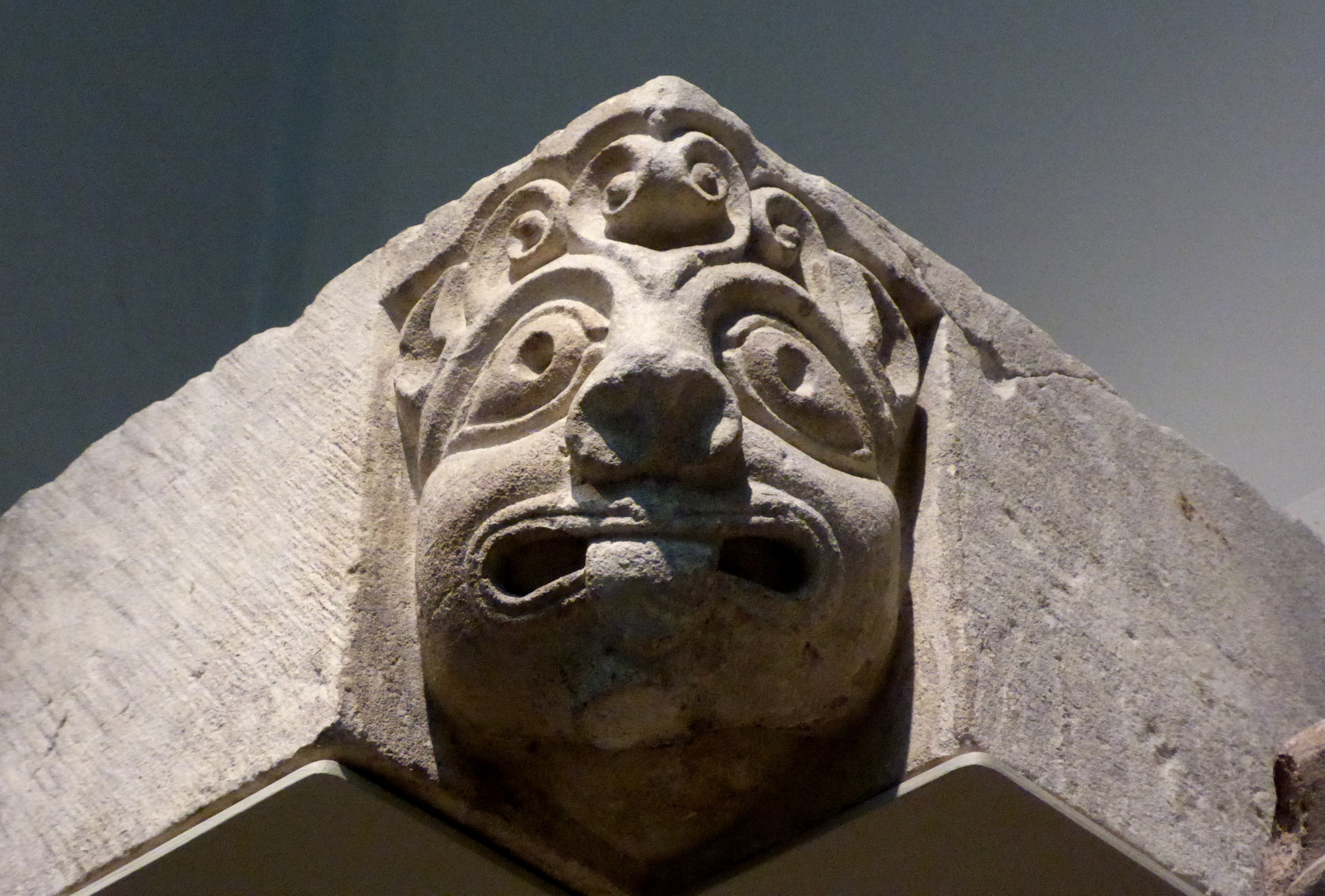
Limestone grotesque held at the British Museum

Often also referred to as chimeras, grotesques are the carvings around gargoyles, which are the spouts designed to drain water from buildings. They largely portray mythical creatures which were considered to protect the buildings they reside on from evil and encourage the viewer to reflect on the separation between themselves and the divine.

Due to the use of weighty stone to create the grotesques, they were carved in workshops and then lifted into the heights of buildings after they were completed. The main materials used to create grotesques included marble, sandstone, and limestone with the option of including metal rods to reinforce their structural integrity.

In most instances grotesques are open-mouthed with their attached waterspout emerging from their mouths however they are a variety of ways for the waterspout to emerge. In many instances they emerge from the figures body or from an object that the carving is holding instead. As grotesques were extensions of waterspouts, most sustained water damage where the water flowed out, making them difficult to repair without replacing the entire sculpture.

Due to their necessity in draining water from gutters in buildings, grotesques are commonly found placed high on rooftops and on cornices in interior walls. This also often makes grotesques commonly slightly hidden, allowing their subject matter to be more playful than architectural features placed at eye level also allowing their architects to be more creative in the designs of their water draining features to achieve aesthetic continuity within their buildings.

== Religious importance ==
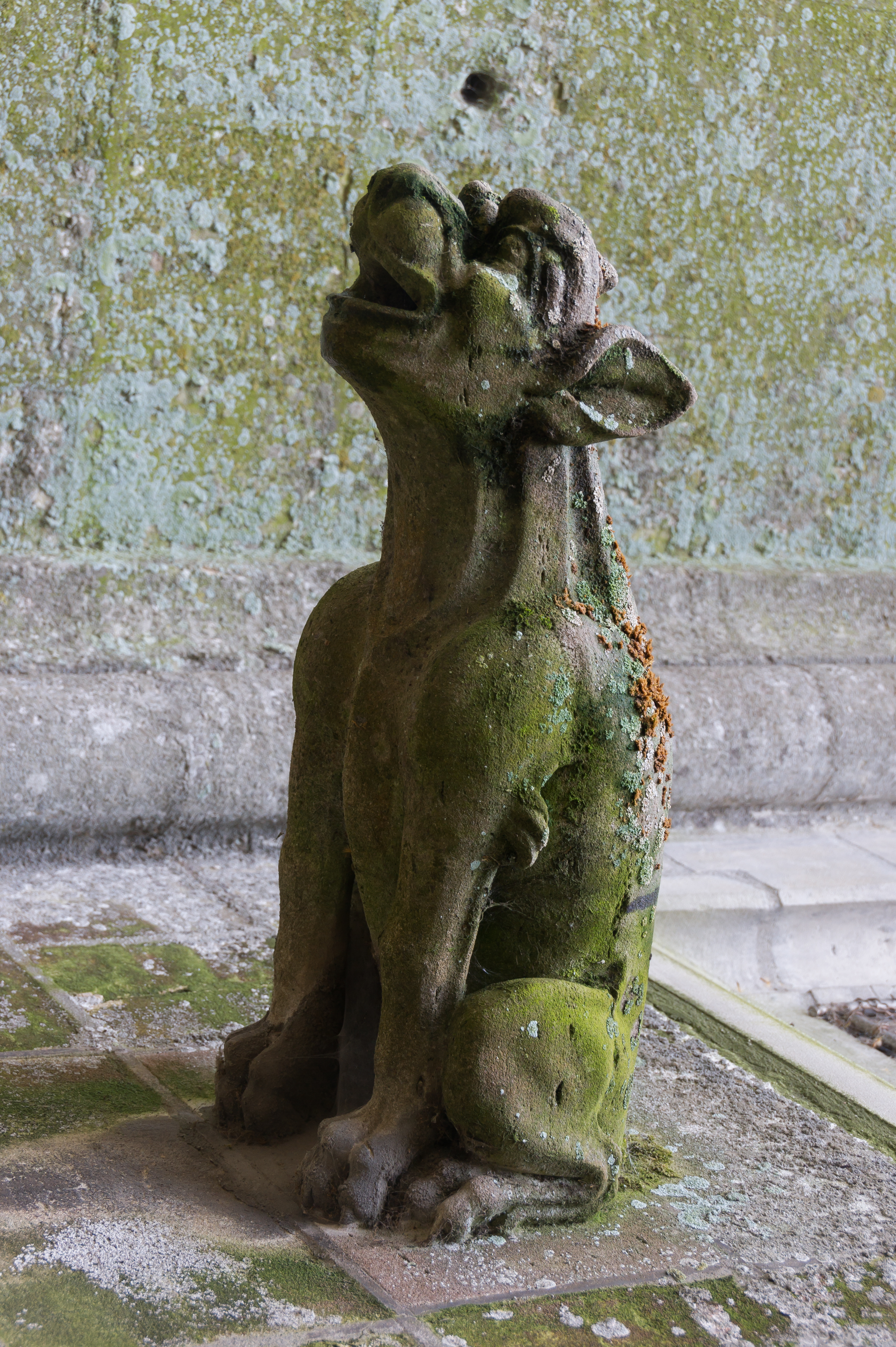
Grotesque on Bayeux Cathedral, France

Despite adorning mostly religious spaces and buildings of importance, the bizarre thematic patterns of grotesques are unusual and often not necessarily aligned with the views of the institutions they occupy. Often meant to be humorous, such as the long-necked grotesques at the Bayeux Cathedral, their contradictory meanings and placement still raise many questions.

For example, grotesques on religious buildings sometimes included sexually explicit content. The juxtaposition of the subversive carvings in largely religious contexts remains contested. Scholars such as Marta Zajac interpret the use of crude humour as a tactic to ward away evil, while other scholars connect this crudeness to the rise of the gothic art style that began to emerge in the 12th century.

The combined history of religion and grotesques in architecture is also potentially a result of the stability of religion that existed at the times when grotesques became prominent, in both the Medieval and Renaissance periods, specifically in Europe. Gaurav Majumdar argues that consistency in religion has allowed for the stylistic development of churches architecturally separate from their teachings. As a result, the unique style of grotesques was allowed to develop and flourish to adorn churches and cathedrals but exist separately from them. This explains the number of grotesques that exist in Venice, Italy as the church was well established there allowing for the unique style of grotesques to develop separately from the church.

These bizarre forms also show a “capacity for transformation” which is consistent with common ideas in the church at the time. Although the significance of grotesques being included in religious spaces is contested, their commonality on these buildings of importance showcases their stylistic development that occurred in tandem with the rising influence of religion, in particular, with the influence of the Catholic Church in Europe in the time from the 12th to the 17th century.

== Gallery ==
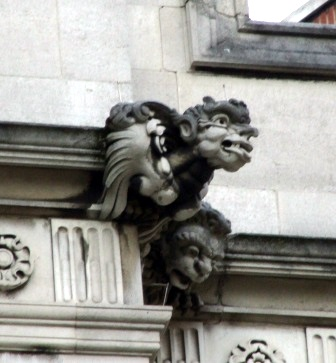
Grotesque by Nathaniel Hitch on exterior of 2 Temple Place, London

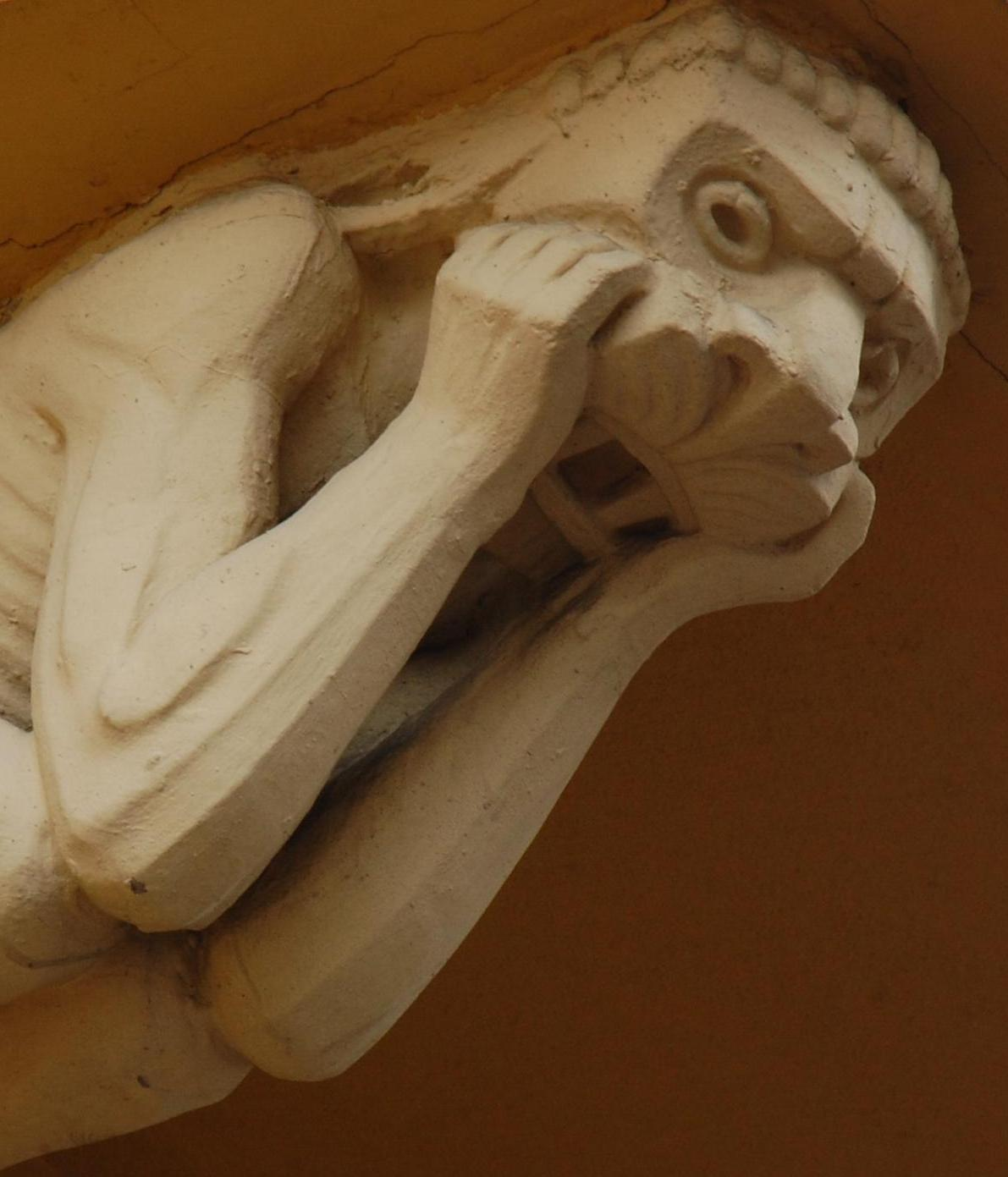
Detail from Tors gate 1 in Frogner, Oslo, Norway. The Art Nouveau house by architect Syver Nielsen, 1913.

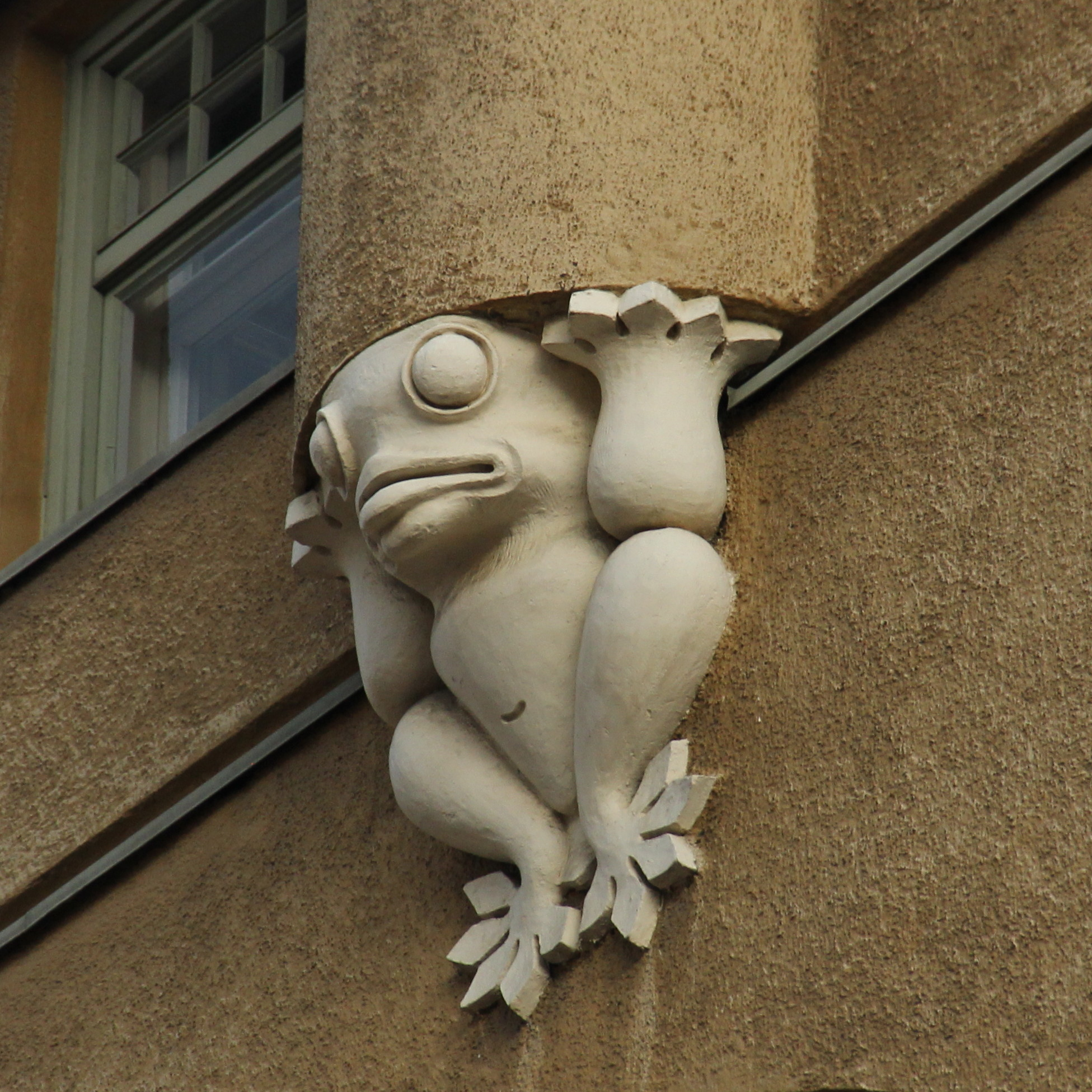
A frog statue supporting an engaged column on the Agronomy House in Helsinki, Finland

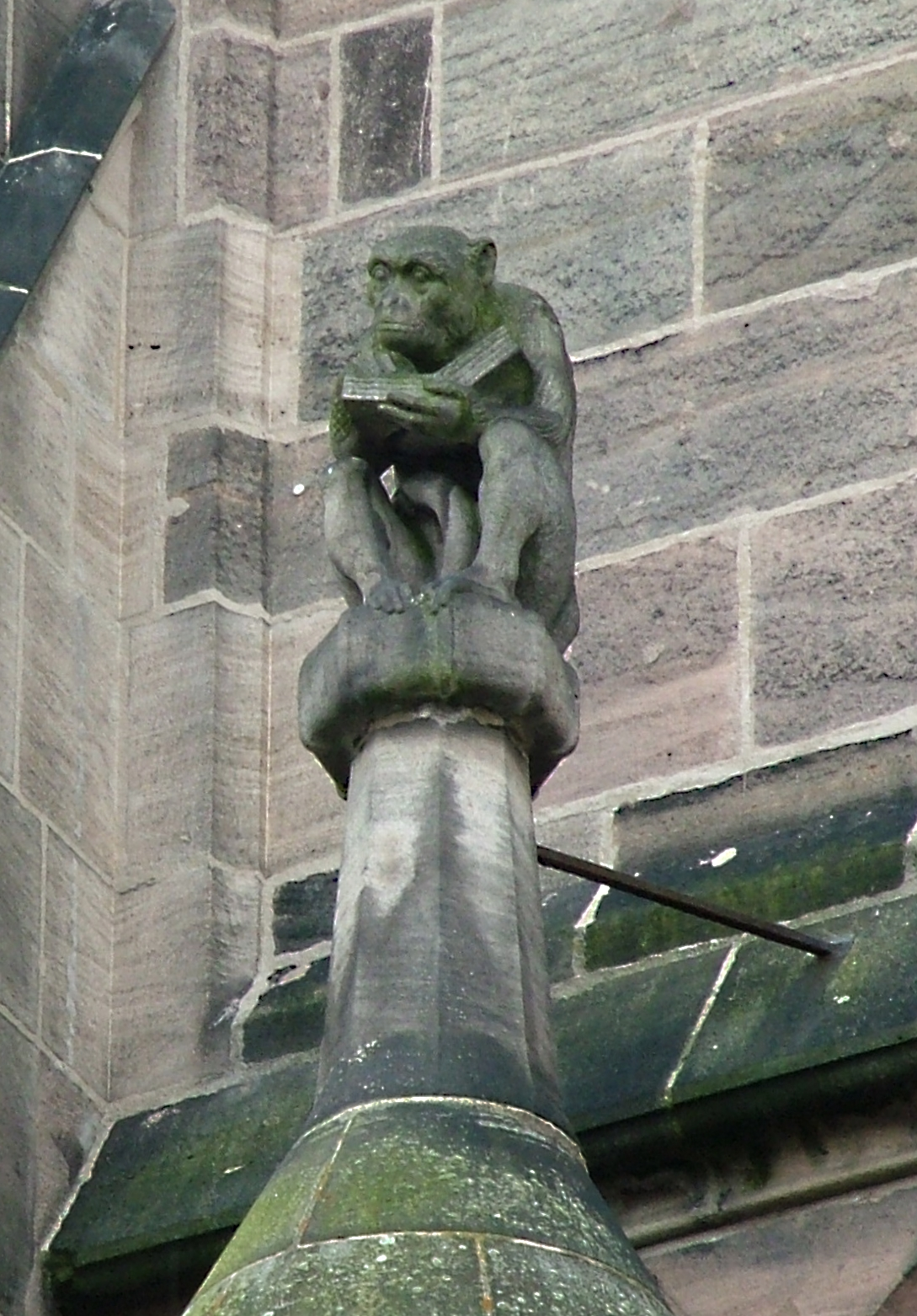
Architectural monument, Bavaria

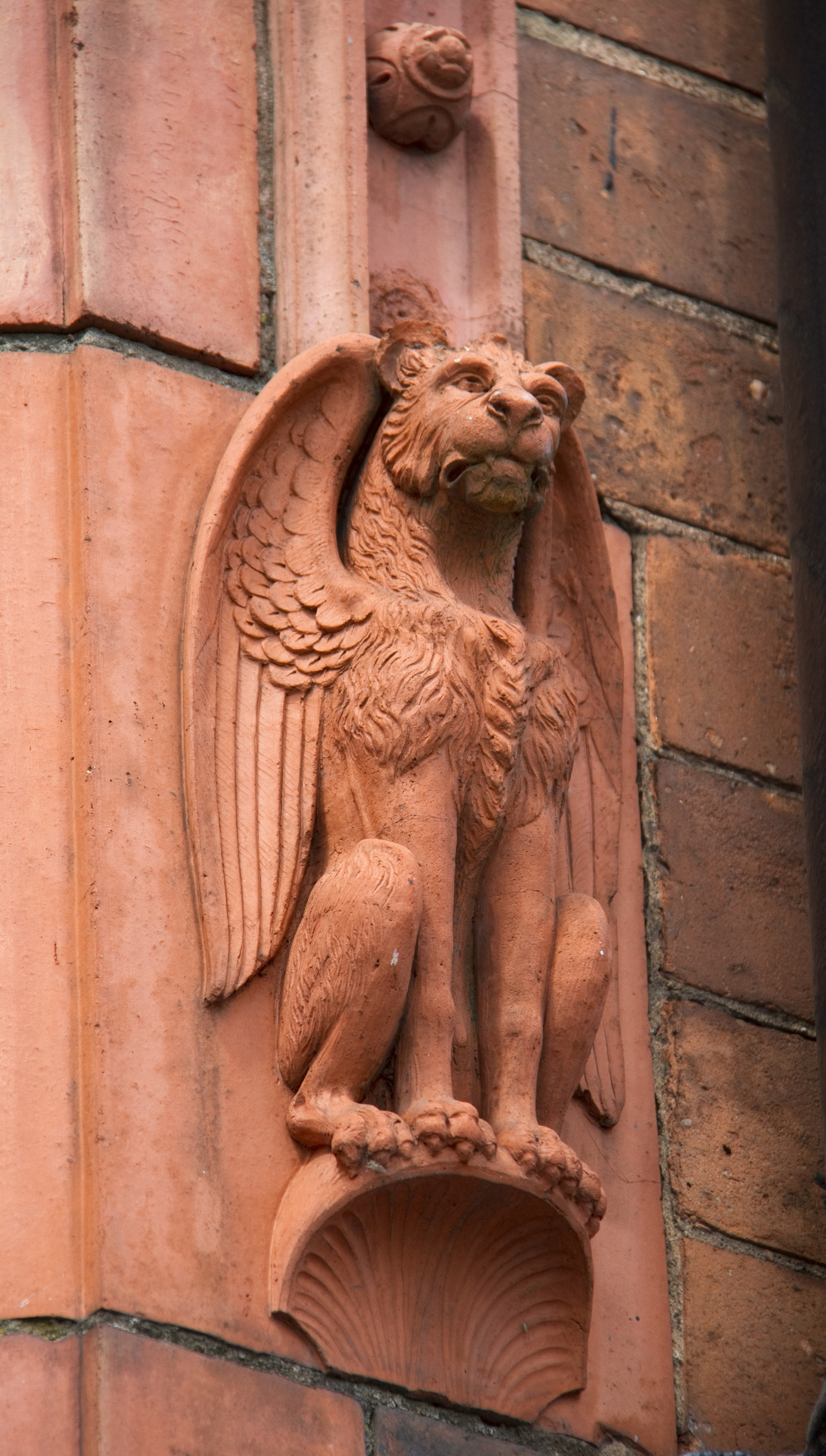
A red Brick and Terracotta Gothic styled Library, designed by Martin and Chamberlain and completed in 1893

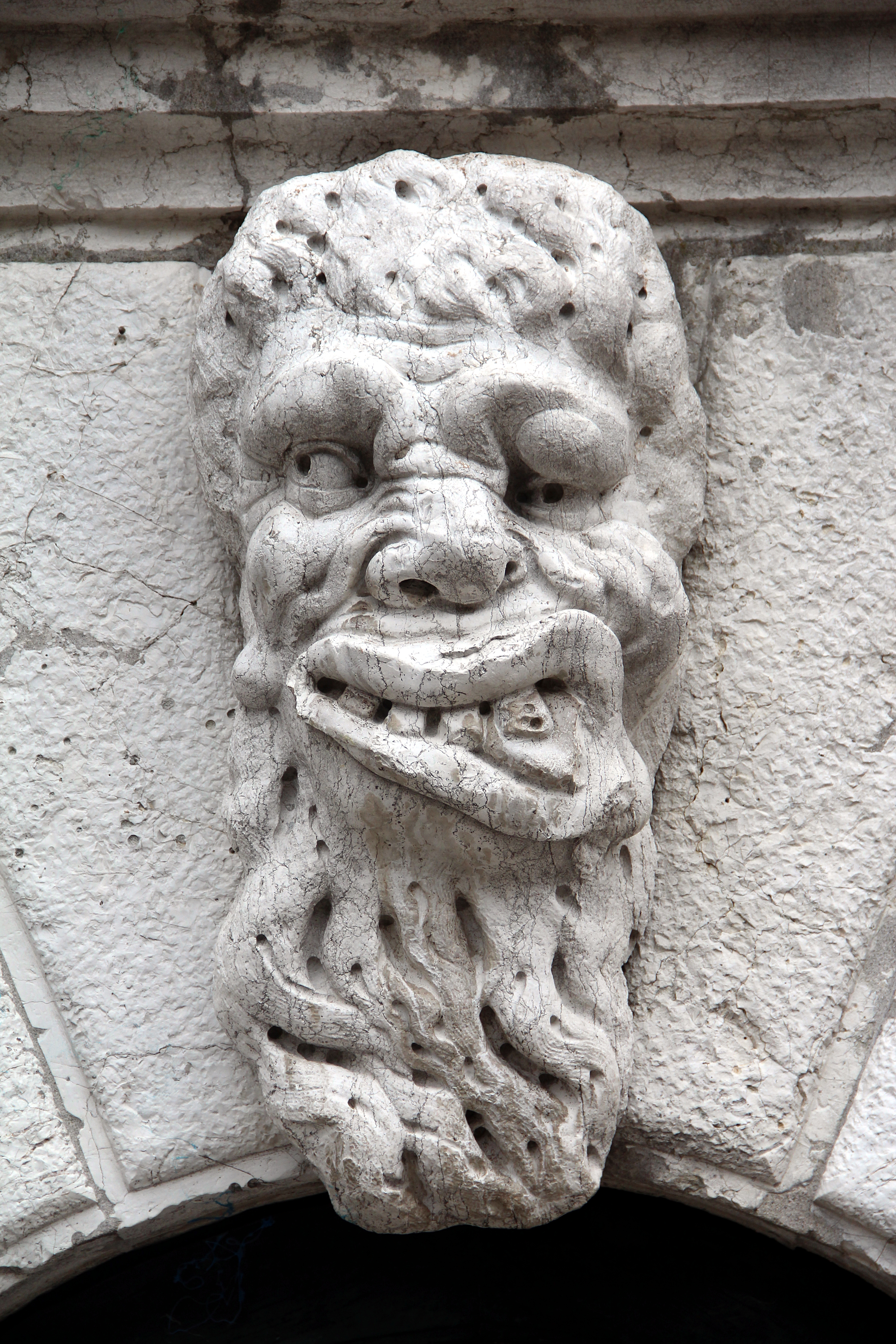
Grotesque adorning the door of the bell tower of the church Santa Maria Formosa in Venice.

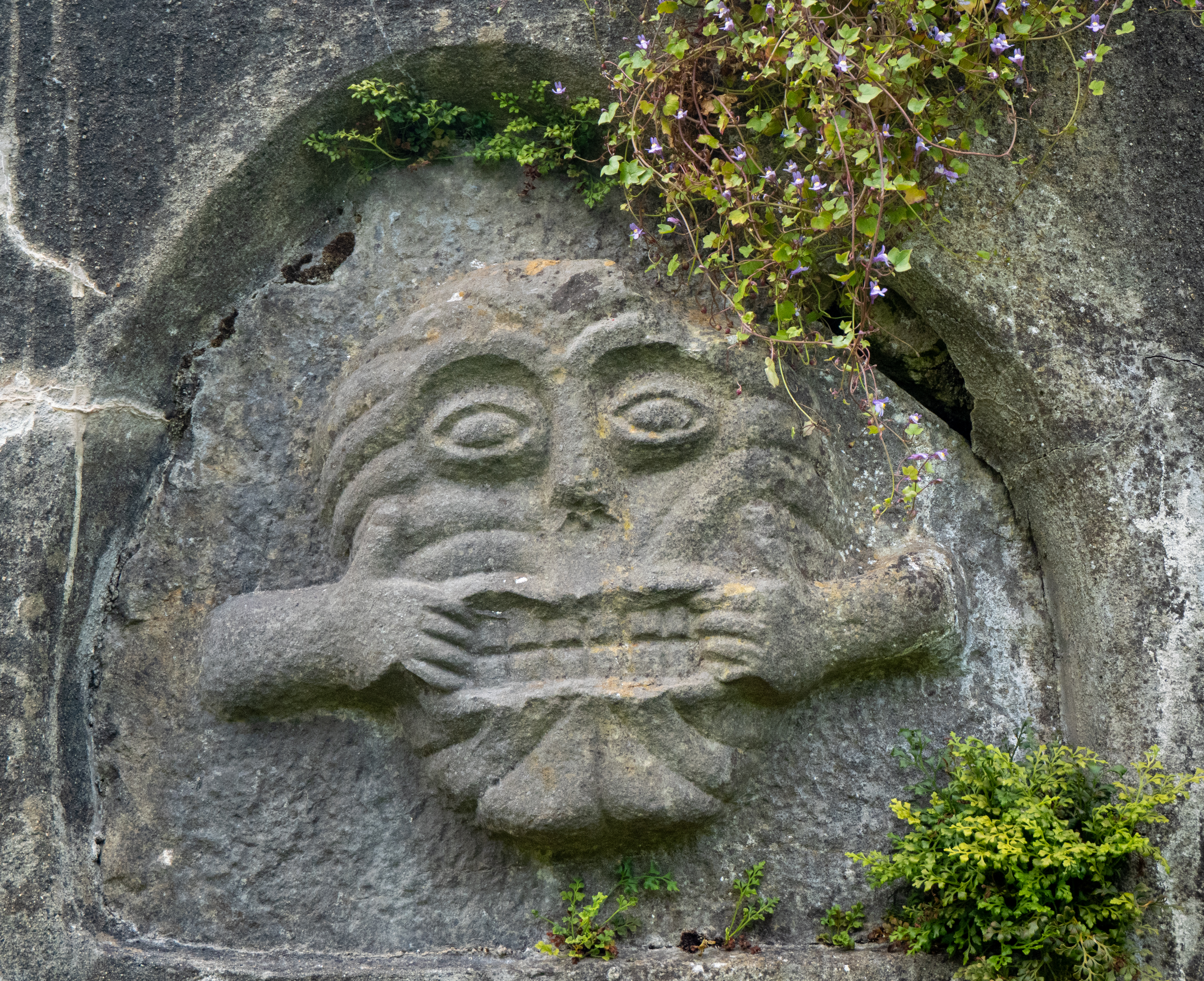
Grotesque in the grounds of St. Louis Secondary School, Dundalk, Ireland.

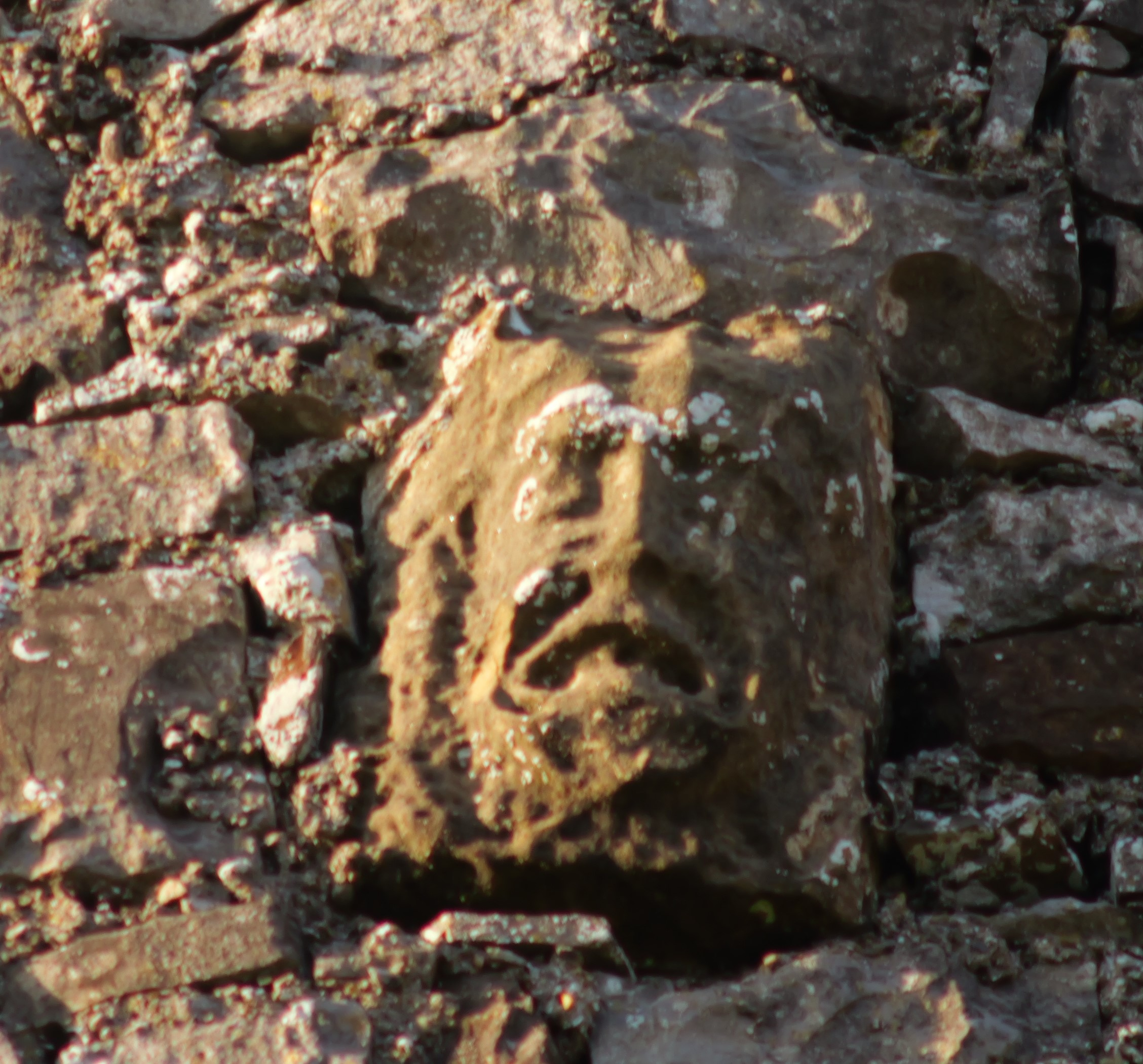
Grotesque, Belfry, Round Tower Church, Lusk, Ireland.

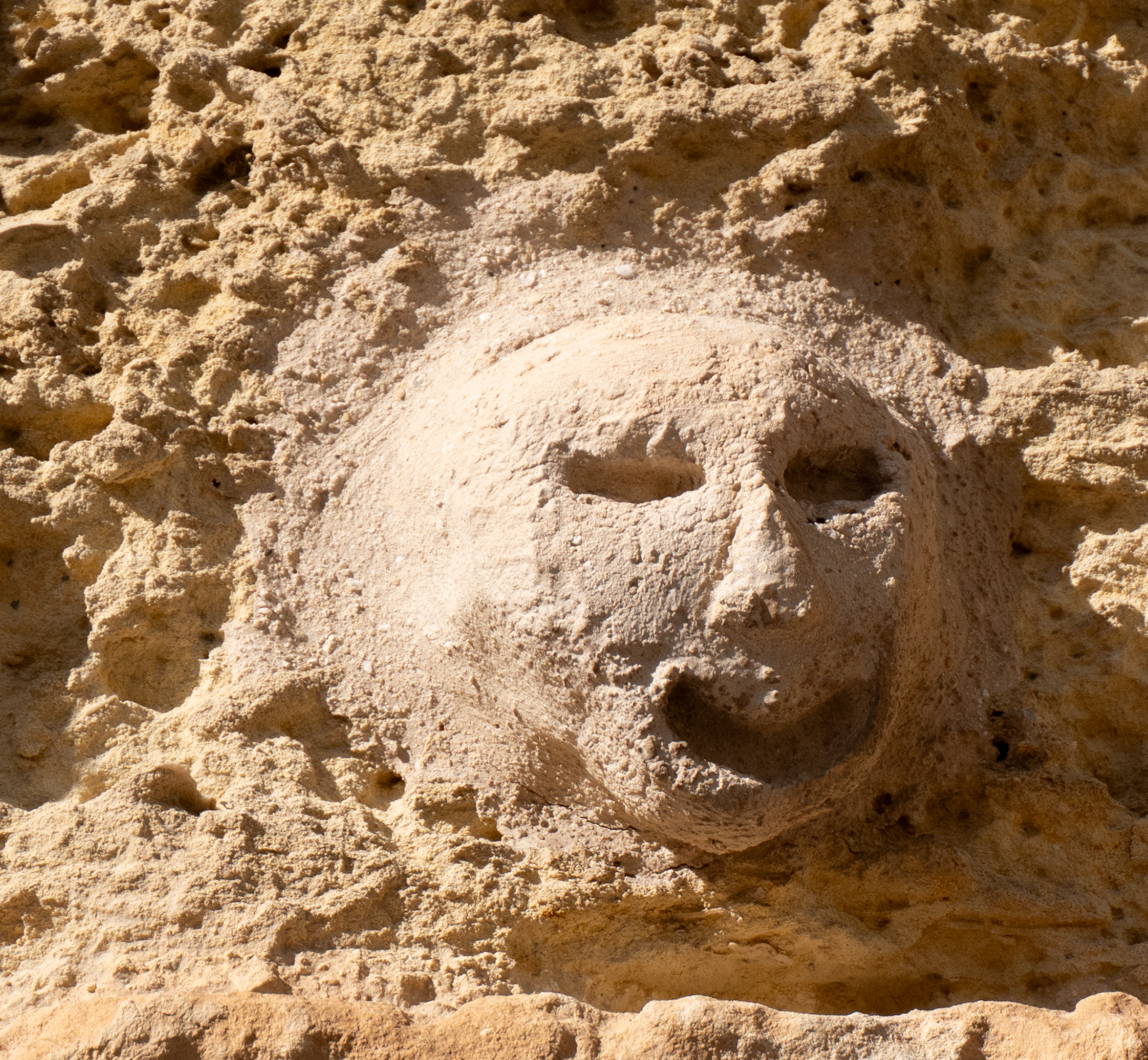
Grotesque near American University, Three Cities, Malta

== See also ==
- Carranca
- Chimera (mythology)
- Chiwen
- Darth Vader grotesque
- Gargoyle
- Grotesque
- Mascaron (architecture)
- Nightmares in the Sky
- Onigawara
- Shachihoko
- Sheela na gig
