= 177 =

177 may refer to:

- 177 (number), a number in the 100s range
- 177 BC, a year Before the Common Era
- AD 177

== Places ==
- Highway 177
- 177 Irma, a main-belt asteroid, the 177th asteroid registered
- 177P/Barnard, a comet, the 177th periodic comet registered
- 177th meridian west
- 177th meridian east
- Pennsylvania House of Representatives, District 177, Pennsylvania, USA

== Military units ==
- No. 177 Squadron RAF, British air force squadron
- 177th Fighter Wing, New Jersey Air National Guard, USA
- 177th Airlift Squadron, North Dakota air National Guard, USA
- 177th Information Warfare Aggressor Squadron, Kansas Air National Guard, USA
- 177th Armored Brigade (United States), United States Army Reserve
- 177th Military Police Brigade (United States), United States Army
- 177th Fighter Aviation Regiment PVO, a WWII Soviet fighter squadron
- 177th Field Regiment, Royal Artillery, a WWII British Royal Artillery unit
- 177 Field Battery, Royal Artillery, a WWII British Royal Artillery battery
- 177 Heavy Battery, Royal Artillery, an interwar British Royal Artillery unit
- 177th Tunnelling Company, a WWI British Royal Engineers unit
- 177th (2/1st Lincoln and Leicester) Brigade, a WWI British Army unit
- 177th Battalion (Simcoe Foresters), CEF, Canada; a WWI infantry battalion
- 177th (Fincastle's Horse) Company, Imperial Yeomanry, a Boer War British Army unit
- 177th Ohio Infantry Regiment, Union Army, USA; during the American Civil War
- 177th New York Infantry Regiment, Union Army, USA; during the American Civil War

== Transportation ==
- Alfa Romeo 177, a 1979 Formula One racecar
- Aston Martin One-77, a car
- Cessna 177 Cardinal, a single-engine high-wing general-aviation airplane
- Peugeot Type 177, a 1920s French car
- Vickers 177, a British interwar biplane single-seat fighter-plane
- 177 (New Jersey bus)
- 177 (ship), ships numbered 177

== Other uses ==
- .177 caliber (4.5mm), a calibre used for BB and pellets, also for hunting and competition shooting
- Radical 177, Han character fragment for leather
- Deutschlandfunk Kultur (AM 177 kHz), a German radio station

== See also ==
- 17 (disambiguation)
- A177 (disambiguation)
- I-177 (disambiguation)
- NA-177 (disambiguation)
- SR177 (disambiguation)
- 177th meridian (disambiguation)
