= 177 (ship) =

Ships numbered 177 include:

== Surface vessels ==
- USNS Shearwater (T-AG-177), a WWII U.S. Navy Shearwater-class auxiliary
- USS Cimarron (AO-177), a Cold War U.S. Navy Cimarron-class fleet oiler
- USS Kingsbury (APA-177), a WWII U.S. Navy Haskell-class attack transport
- USS Europa (AP-177), a trans-Atlantic oceanliner requisitioned as a WWII U.S. Navy troopship
- Soviet minesweeper BT-177, a Cold War Soviet minesweeper
- USS O'Bannon (DD-177), a WWI U.S. Navy Wicker-class destroyer
- USS Reybold (DE-177), a WWII U.S. Navy Cannon-class destroyer escort
- JDS Atago (DDG-177), a Japanese Maritime Self-Defense Force guided missile destroyer
- HMS Faithful (F177), a WWII British Royal Navy repair ship
- HMCS Winnipeg (FSE 177), a WWII Canadian minesweeper
- USS Nightingale (IX-177), a WWII U.S. Navy minesweeper
- HMCS Dunvegan (K177), a WWII Canadian corvette
- USS LST-177, a WWII U.S. Navy tank landing ship
- FV Commandant Bultinck (O-177), a Belgian trawler
- NNS Badagry (P177), a Nigerian navy patrol boat
- USS Davenport (PG-177), an end-of-WWII U.S. Navy Tacoma-class frigate
- USS Emerald (SP-177), a WWI U.S. Navy armed yacht

== Submarines ==
- Japanese submarine I-177, a WWII Japanese Kaidar-class cruiser submarine
- USS Pickerel (SS-177), an interwar U.S. Navy Porpoise-class submarine
- German submarine U-177, a WWII German Kriegsmarine submarine
