= USS O'Bannon =

Three ships of the United States Navy have been named USS O’Bannon, after the early Marine Corps hero Presley O'Bannon (1784–1850), hero of the Battle of Derna.

- The first USS O'Bannon (DD-177) was a Wickes-class destroyer, launched in 1919 and struck in 1936.
- The second USS O'Bannon (DD-450) was a Fletcher-class destroyer, launched in 1942 and struck in 1970. She received the Presidential Unit Citation and earned 17 battle stars for World War II service, more than any other destroyer in the war.
- The third USS O'Bannon (DD-987) was a Spruance-class destroyer, launched in 1978 and struck in 2005.
