= List of highways numbered 176 =

The following highways are numbered 176:

== Canada ==
- New Brunswick Route 176
- Prince Edward Island Route 176

== Costa Rica ==
- National Route 176

== Japan ==
- Japan National Route 176

== United Kingdom ==
- A176 road
- B176 road

== United States ==
- Interstate 176
- U.S. Route 176
- Alabama State Route 176
- Arizona State Route 176 (former)
- Arkansas Highway 176
  - Arkansas Highway 176Y
- California State Route 176 (former)
- Connecticut Route 176
- Georgia State Route 176 (former)
- Illinois Route 176
- K-176 (Kansas highway) (former)
- Kentucky Route 176
- Louisiana Highway 176
- Maine State Route 176
- Maryland Route 176
- M-176 (Michigan highway) (former)
- Missouri Route 176
- New Mexico State Road 176
- New York State Route 176
- Ohio State Route 176
- Pennsylvania Route 176 (former)
- Tennessee State Route 176
- Texas State Highway 176
  - Texas State Highway Spur 176
- Utah State Route 176
  - Utah State Route 176 (1935–1969)
- Virginia State Route 176
- Wisconsin Highway 176 (former)

Territories:

- Puerto Rico Highway 176

Preceded by 175	Lists of highways 176	Succeeded by 177
