= List of highways numbered 175 =

The following highways are numbered 175:

== Canada ==
- Prince Edward Island Route 175
- Quebec Route 175

== Costa Rica ==
- National Route 175

== Japan ==
- Japan National Route 175

== Mexico ==
- Mexican Federal Highway 175

== United Kingdom ==
- B175 road

== United States ==
- Interstate 175
- U.S. Route 175
- Alabama State Route 175
- Arkansas Highway 175
  - Arkansas Highway 175 Spur
- California State Route 175
- Connecticut Route 175
- Florida State Road 175
- Georgia State Route 175 (former)
- Illinois Route 175 (former)
- Iowa Highway 175
- K-175 (Kansas highway)
- Kentucky Route 175
- Louisiana Highway 175
- Maine State Route 175
- Maryland Route 175
- M-175 (Michigan highway) (former)
- Minnesota State Highway 175
- Missouri Route 175
- New Hampshire Route 175
  - New Hampshire Route 175A
- New Jersey Route 175
- New Mexico State Road 175
- New York State Route 175
  - New York State Route 175X
- North Carolina Highway 175
- Ohio State Route 175
- Tennessee State Route 175
- Texas State Highway 175
  - Farm to Market Road 175 (Texas)
- Utah State Route 175 (former)
- Virginia State Route 175
- Wisconsin Highway 175
- Wyoming Highway 175

Territories

- Puerto Rico Highway 175

Preceded by 174	Lists of highways 175	Succeeded by 176
