= List of highways numbered 178 =

The following highways are numbered 178:

== Canada ==
- Prince Edward Island Route 178

== India ==
- Andhra Pradesh State Highway 178

== Japan ==
- Japan National Route 178

== United Kingdom ==
- A178 road
- B178 road

== United States ==
- Interstate 178 (former proposal)
- U.S. Route 178
- Alabama State Route 178
- Arkansas Highway 178
- California State Route 178
- Connecticut Route 178
- Georgia State Route 178
- Illinois Route 178
- K-178 (Kansas highway)
- Kentucky Route 178
- Louisiana Highway 178
- Maine State Route 178
- Maryland Route 178
- M-178 (Michigan highway) (former)
- Mississippi Highway 178
- New Jersey Route 178 (never built)
- New York State Route 178
- Pennsylvania Route 178 (former)
- Tennessee State Route 178
- Texas State Highway 178
  - Texas State Highway Loop 178
  - Farm to Market Road 178 (Texas)
- Utah State Route 178
- Virginia State Route 178
- Wisconsin Highway 178

Territories

- Puerto Rico Highway 178

Preceded by 177	Lists of highways 178	Succeeded by 179
