= List of highways numbered 180 =

The following highways are numbered 180:

== Australia ==
- Pyrenees Highway

== Canada ==
- New Brunswick Route 180
- Prince Edward Island Route 180
- Winnipeg Route 180

== Costa Rica ==
- National Route 180

== Ireland ==
- R180 road (Ireland)

== Japan ==
- Japan National Route 180

== Malaysia ==
- A180 A180 road (Malaysia) (Jalan Ayer Hitam Labu)
- North–South Port Link (Federal Route 180)

== Mexico ==
- Mexican Federal Highway 180
- Mexican Federal Autopista 180D

== Russia ==
- A180 highway (Russia)

== United Kingdom ==
- A180 road
- M180 motorway
- B180 road

== United States ==
- Interstate 180 (multiple highways)
- U.S. Route 180
- Alabama State Route 180
- Arizona State Route 180A
- Arkansas Highway 180
- California State Route 180
- Florida State Road 180 (former)
- Georgia State Route 180
- Hawaii Route 180
- Illinois Route 180
- K-180 (Kansas highway) (former)
- Kentucky Route 180
- Louisiana Route 180
- Maine State Route 180
- Maryland Route 180
- M-180 (Michigan highway) (former)
- Missouri Route 180
- New Jersey Route 180 (former)
- New York State Route 180
- North Carolina Highway 180
- Ohio State Route 180
- Oregon Route 180
- Tennessee State Route 180
- Texas State Highway 180
  - Texas State Highway Spur 180
  - Farm to Market Road 180 (Texas)
- Utah State Route 180
- Virginia State Route 180
- West Virginia Route 180
- Wisconsin Highway 180

Territories

- Puerto Rico Highway 180

Preceded by 179	Lists of highways 180	Succeeded by 181
