= List of highways numbered 177 =

The following highways are numbered 177:

== Canada ==
- New Brunswick Route 177
- Prince Edward Island Route 177

== Costa Rica ==
- National Route 177

== Ireland ==
- R177 road (Ireland)

== Japan ==
- Japan National Route 177

== United Kingdom ==
- A177 road
- B177 road

== United States ==
- U.S. Route 177
- Alabama State Route 177
- Arizona State Route 177
- Arkansas Highway 177
- California State Route 177
- Colorado State Highway 177
- Connecticut Route 177
- Florida State Road 177 (former)
- Georgia State Route 177
- Illinois Route 177
- K-177 (Kansas highway)
- Kentucky Route 177
- Louisiana Highway 177
- Maine State Route 177
- Maryland Route 177
- Massachusetts Route 177
- M-177 (Michigan highway) (former)
- Missouri Route 177
- New Jersey Route 177 (former)
- New Mexico State Road 177
- New York State Route 177
- North Carolina Highway 177
- Ohio State Route 177
- Pennsylvania Route 177
- Rhode Island Route 177
- South Carolina Highway 177
- Tennessee State Route 177
- Texas State Highway 177 (former)
  - Texas State Highway Loop 177
  - Farm to Market Road 177 (Texas)
- Utah State Route 177 (former)
- Virginia State Route 177
- Wisconsin Highway 177 (former)

Territories:

- Puerto Rico Highway 177

Preceded by 176	Lists of highways 177	Succeeded by 178
