= Japan National Route 176 =

Road in Japan

National Route 176
- 国道176号
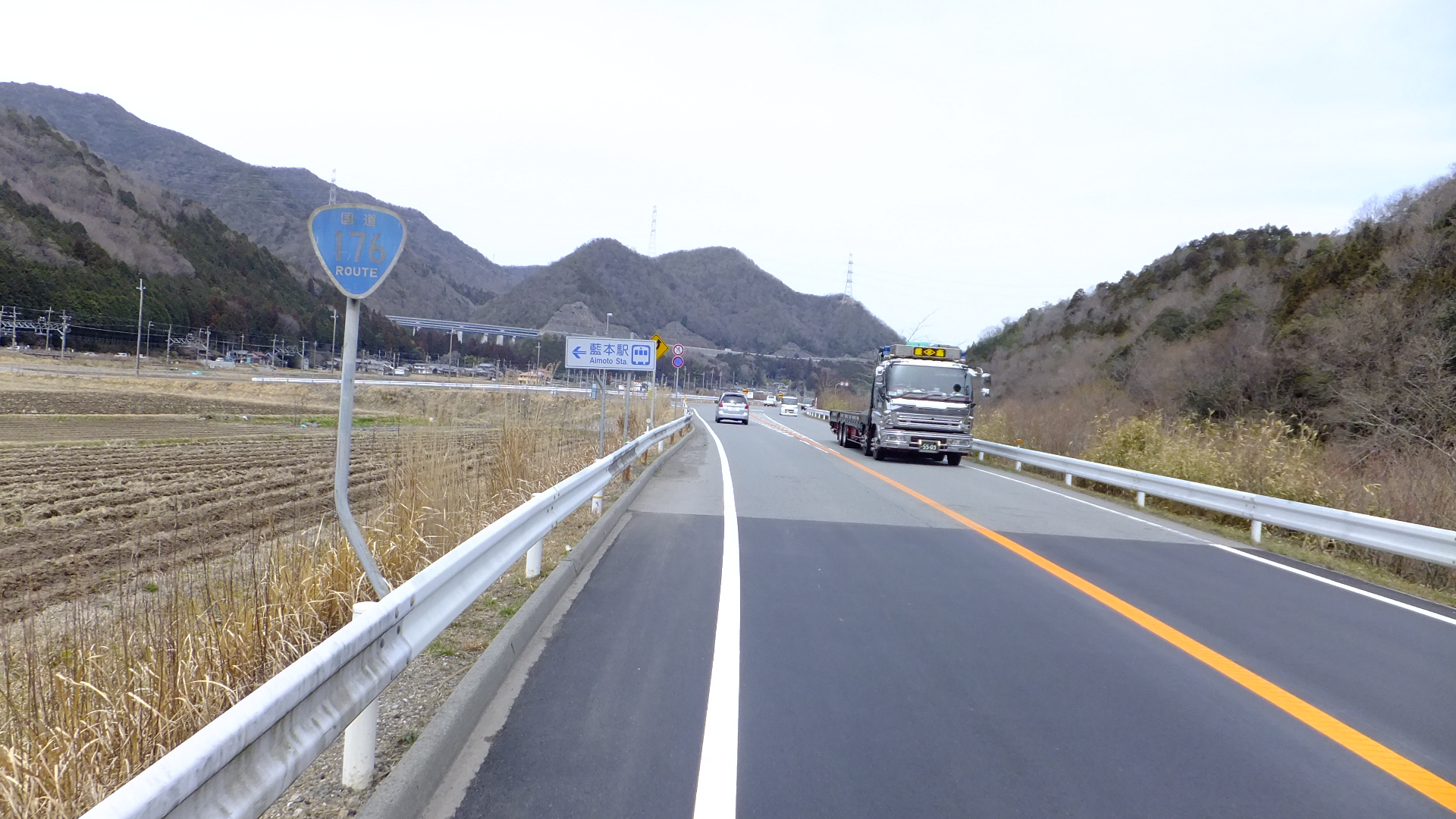

Route information
- Length: 154.2 km (95.8 mi)
- Existed: 18 May 1953–present

Major junctions
- North end: National Route 178 in Miyazu, Kyoto
- South end: National Route 1 / National Route 2 / National Route 25 in Kita-ku, Osaka

Location
- Country: Japan

Highway system
- National highways of Japan; Expressways of Japan
← National Route 175	→ National Route 177

National Route 176 is a national highway of Japan connecting Miyazu, Kyoto and Kita-ku, Osaka in Japan, with a total length of 154.2 km (95.82 mi).
