= SR177 =

SR 177 may refer to:

- Saunders-Roe SR.177, a rocket-powered jet fighter-interceptor
- State Road 177 or State Route 177
