= Presley O'Bannon =

18/19th-century United States Marine Corps officer

First Lieutenant Presley Neville O'Bannon
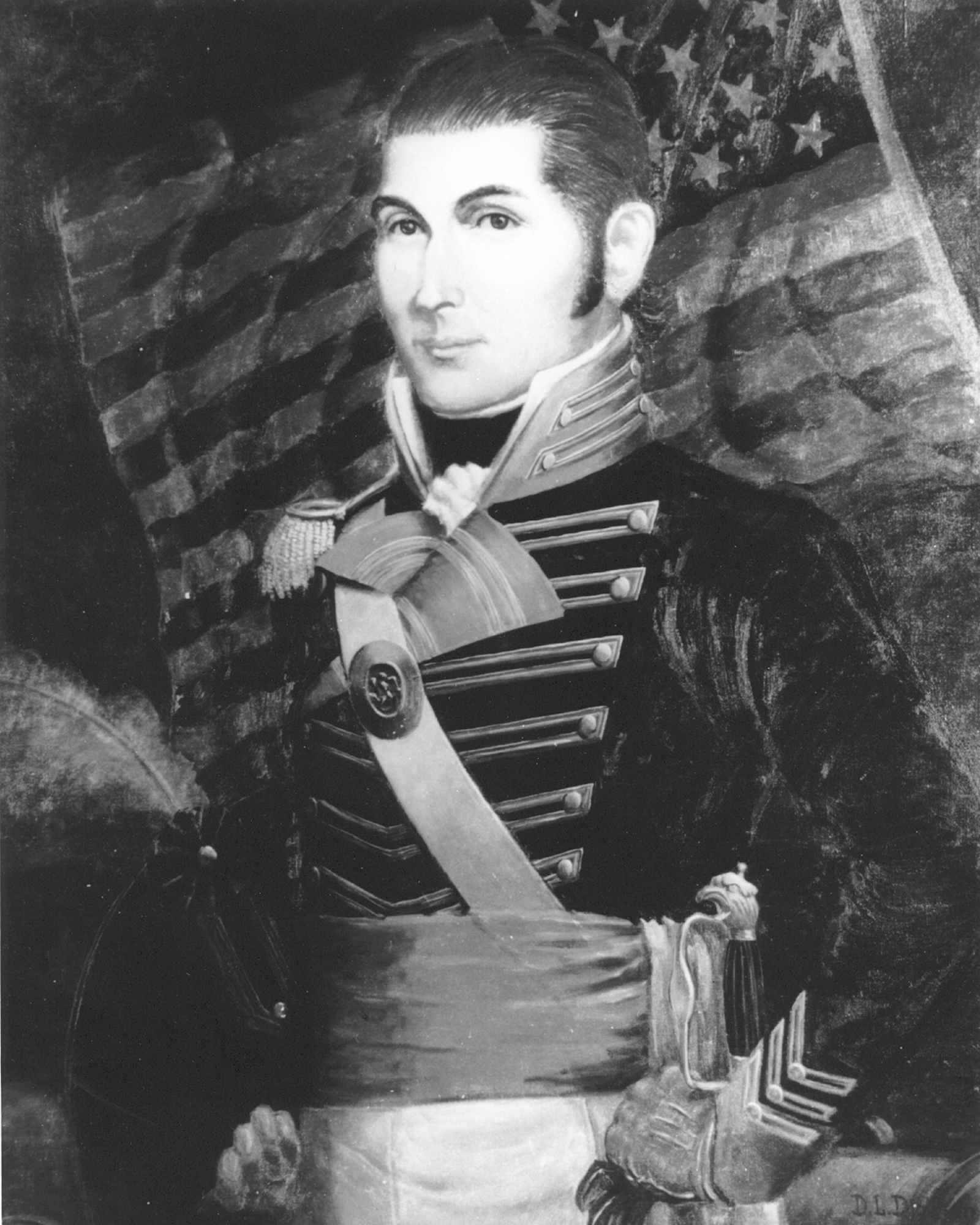
- Born: c. 1776; Fauquier County, Virginia
- Died: September 12, 1850 (aged 73–74); Henry County, Kentucky
- Burial place: Frankfort Cemetery
- Military career
- Allegiance: United States of America
- Branch: United States Marine Corps
- Service years: 1801–1807
- Rank: First lieutenant
- Nickname: "Hero of Derna"
- Conflicts: First Barbary War; Battle of Derna

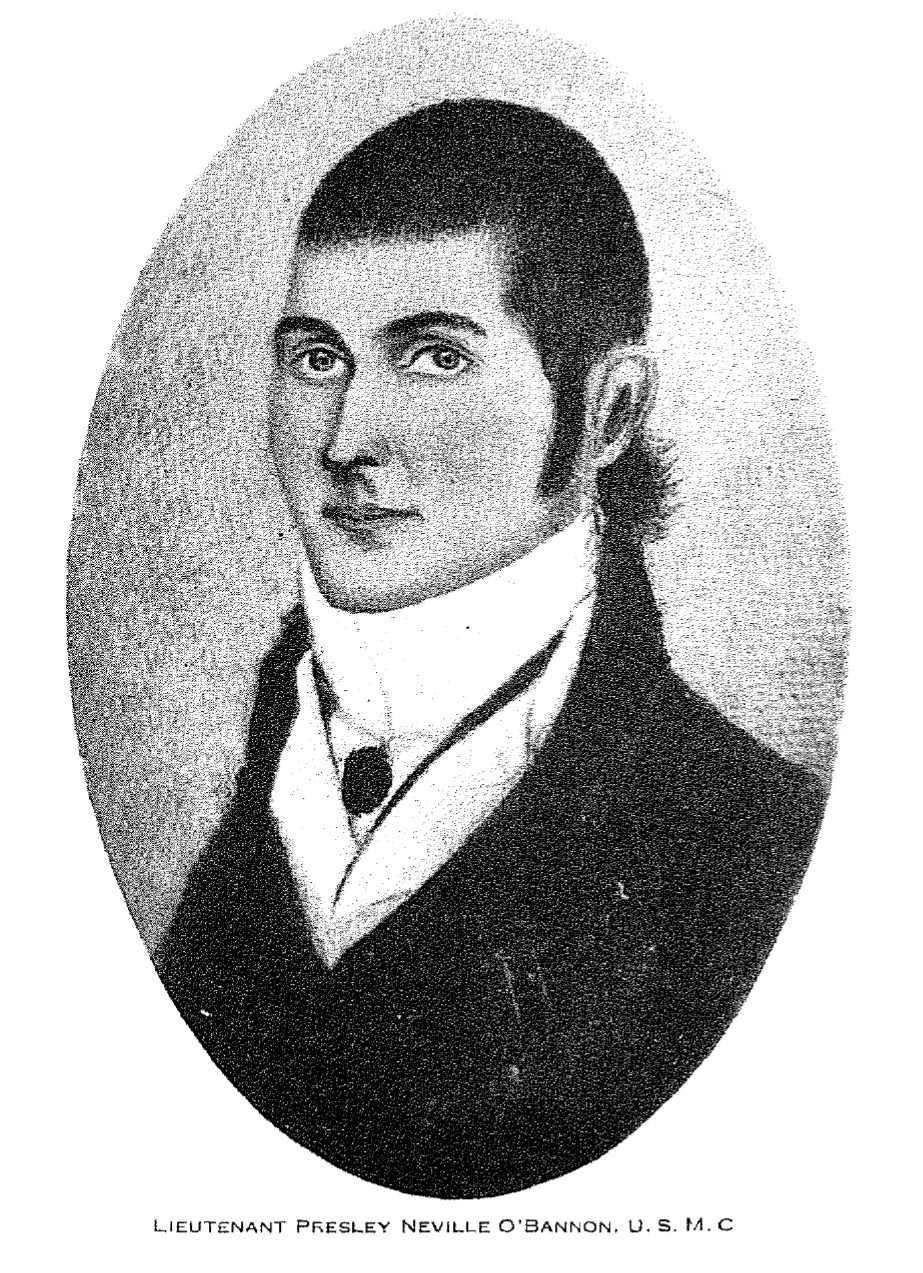
Presley O'Bannon, from Naval Documents

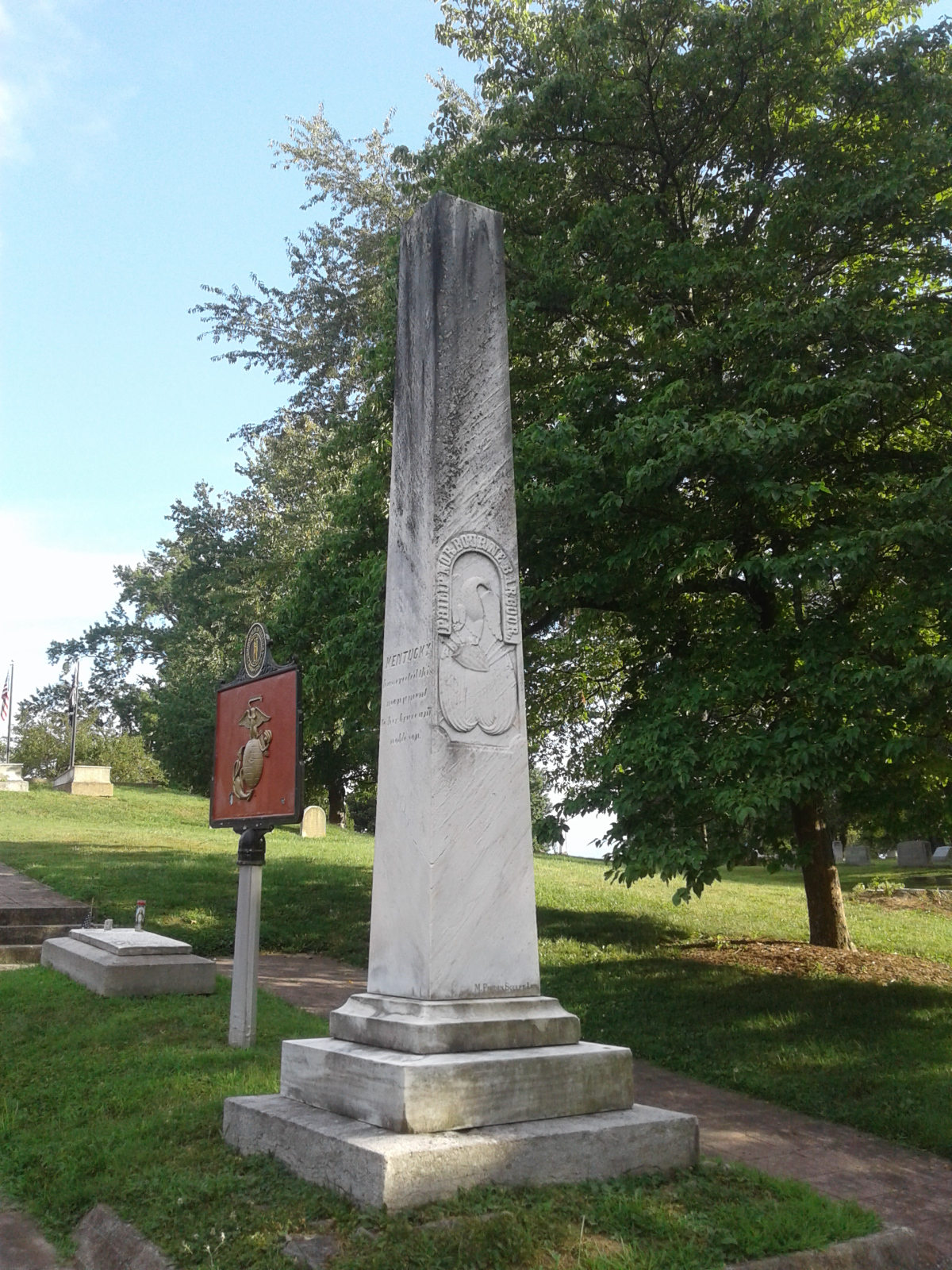
Presley O'Bannon's grave monument in Frankfort Cemetery

Presley O'Bannon (c. 1776 – September 12, 1850) was a first lieutenant in the United States Marine Corps, famous for his exploits in the First Barbary War. In recognition of his bravery, he was presented a sword for his part in attempting to restore Prince Hamet Karamanli to his throne as the bey of Tripoli. This sword became the model for the Mameluke sword, adopted in 1825 for Marine Corps officers, which is part of the formal uniform today.

== Biography ==
Presley Neville O'Bannon was born in Fauquier County, Virginia, to William O'Bannon, a captain of the Continental Army in the American Revolutionary War, and Anne Neville, a sister of General John Neville, commander of Fort Pitt during the Revolution. O'Bannon was probably named after Neville's son Presley, who was aide-de-camp to the Marquis de Lafayette.

O'Bannon entered the Marine Corps on January 18, 1801. As a first lieutenant assigned to USS Argus, he commanded a detachment of seven Marines and two Navy midshipmen in diplomatic Consul General William Eaton's small army during the Tripoli campaign of the First Barbary War. In the combined operations with the U.S. Navy, he led the successful attack at the Battle of Derna, a coastal town in eastern modern Libya, on April 27, 1805, giving the Marines' Hymn its line "to the shores of Tripoli." Lieutenant O'Bannon became the first man to raise a United States flag over foreign soil in time of war; Eaton, a former Army officer, had raised the flag several months earlier while traveling on the Nile River from Alexandria to Cairo, but it had not been in a time of war. According to Marine Corps legend, Hamet Karamanli was so impressed with O'Bannon's bravery that he gave him a Mameluke sword as a gesture of respect.

O'Bannon resigned from the Marine Corps on March 6, 1807. He moved to Logan County, Kentucky, making his home in Russellville. He served in the Kentucky State Legislature in 1812, 1817, and 1820–21, and in the Kentucky State Senate from 1824 to 1826. Some time before 1826, he married Matilda Heard, daughter of Major James Heard and Nancy Morgan, a daughter of American Revolutionary War General Daniel Morgan, commander at the Battle of Cowpens in 1781.

O'Bannon died in 1850 at age 74 in Pleasureville, Kentucky. In 1919, his remains were moved to the Frankfort Cemetery in Kentucky's state capital.

== Mameluke sword ==
Because of O'Bannon's distinguished record during the Derna campaign, Marine Corps Commandant Archibald Henderson in 1825 adopted the Mameluke sword for wear by all Marine Corps commissioned officers. Since the initial distribution in 1826, the Mameluke sword has been worn except for between 1859 and 1875, when regulations temporarily required Marine officers to wear the model U.S. Army M1850 foot officers' sword. Mameluke swords are worn by Marine Corps officers as prescribed with all uniforms except the evening dress and utility uniform.

== Namesakes ==
Three Navy ships have been named USS O'Bannon in his honor:

- USS O'Bannon (DD-177), a Wickes-class destroyer which was launched in 1919 and struck in 1936;
- USS O'Bannon (DD-450), a Fletcher-class destroyer which was launched in 1942 and struck in 1970; USS O'Bannon(DD-450) in service during WWII and according to legend attacked a Japanese submarine with potatoes.
- USS O'Bannon (DD-987), a Spruance-class destroyer, which was launched in 1978 and struck in 2005.

O'Bannon Hall, at the Basic School in Quantico, Virginia is named in honor of Presley O'Bannon.

== See also ==
- List of historic United States Marines
