= Maizuru =

Maizuru 舞鶴市
- City
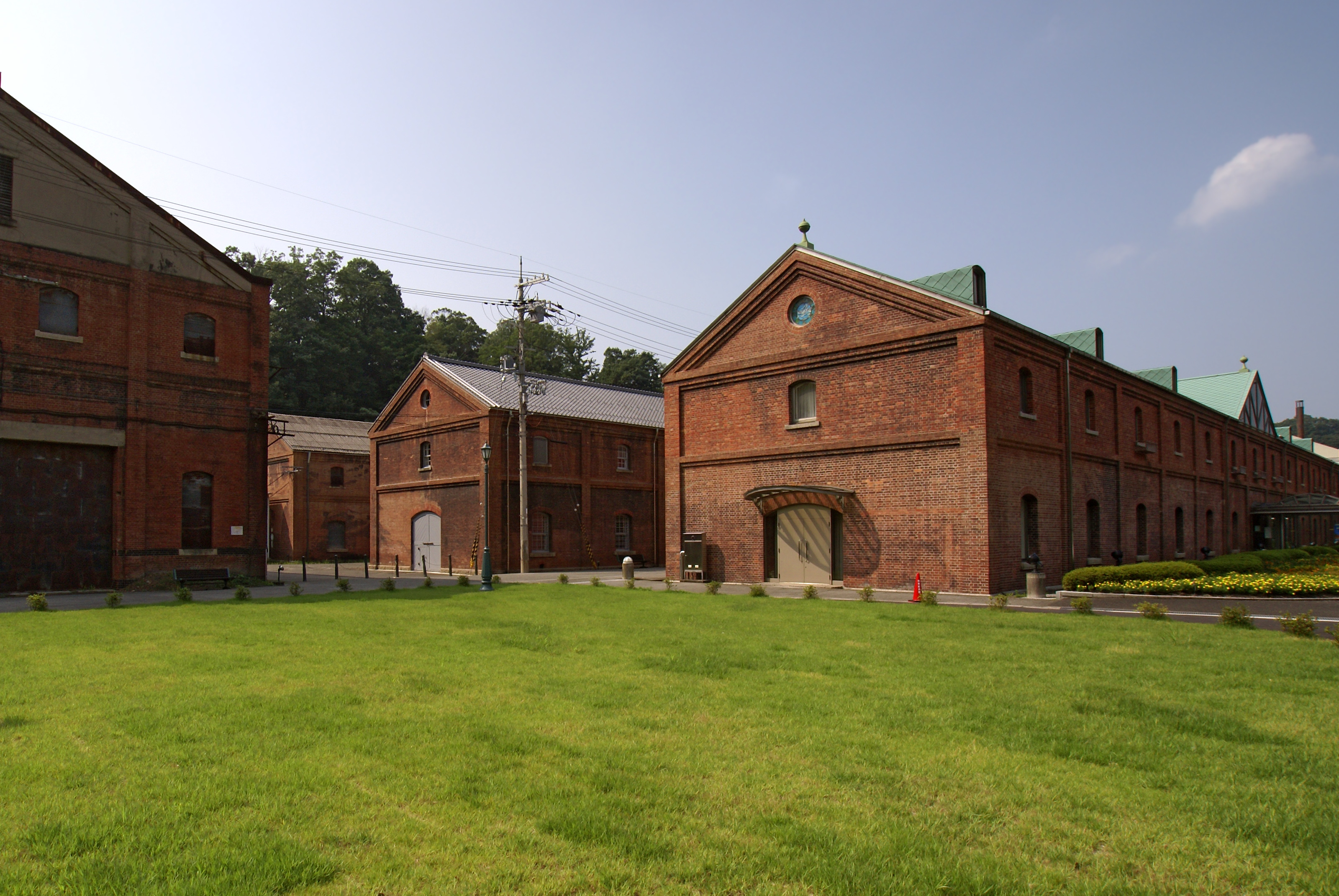

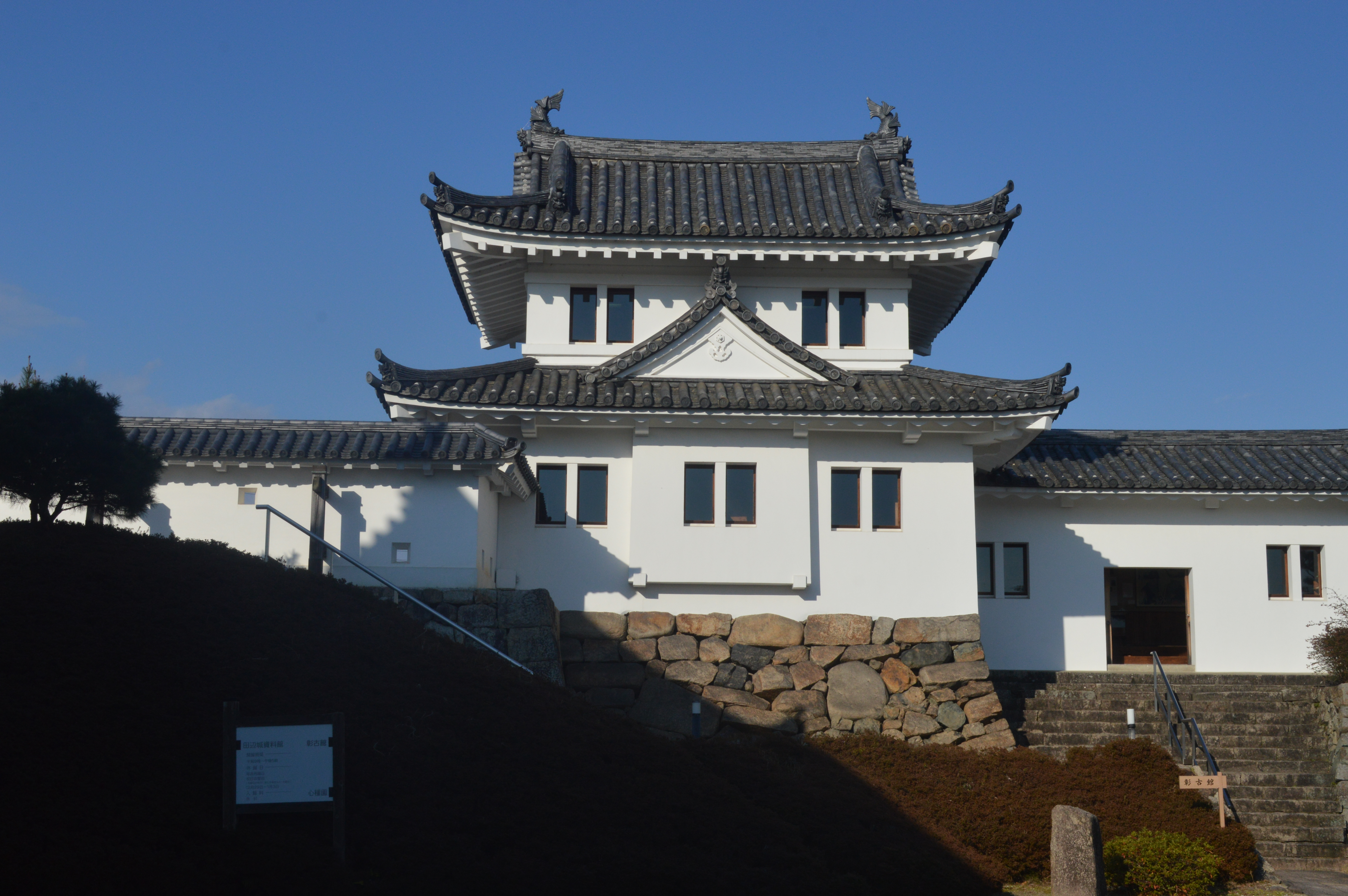

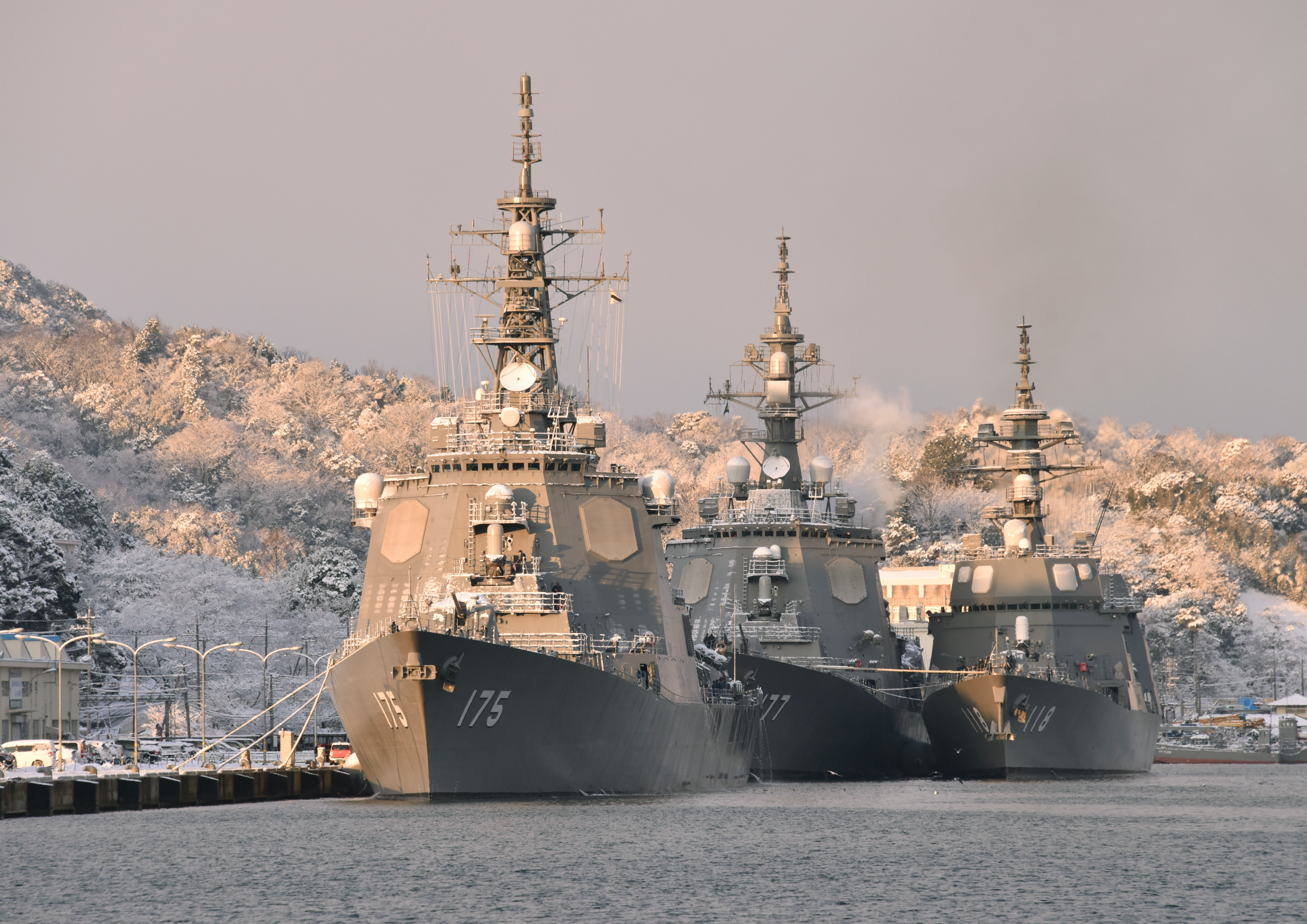

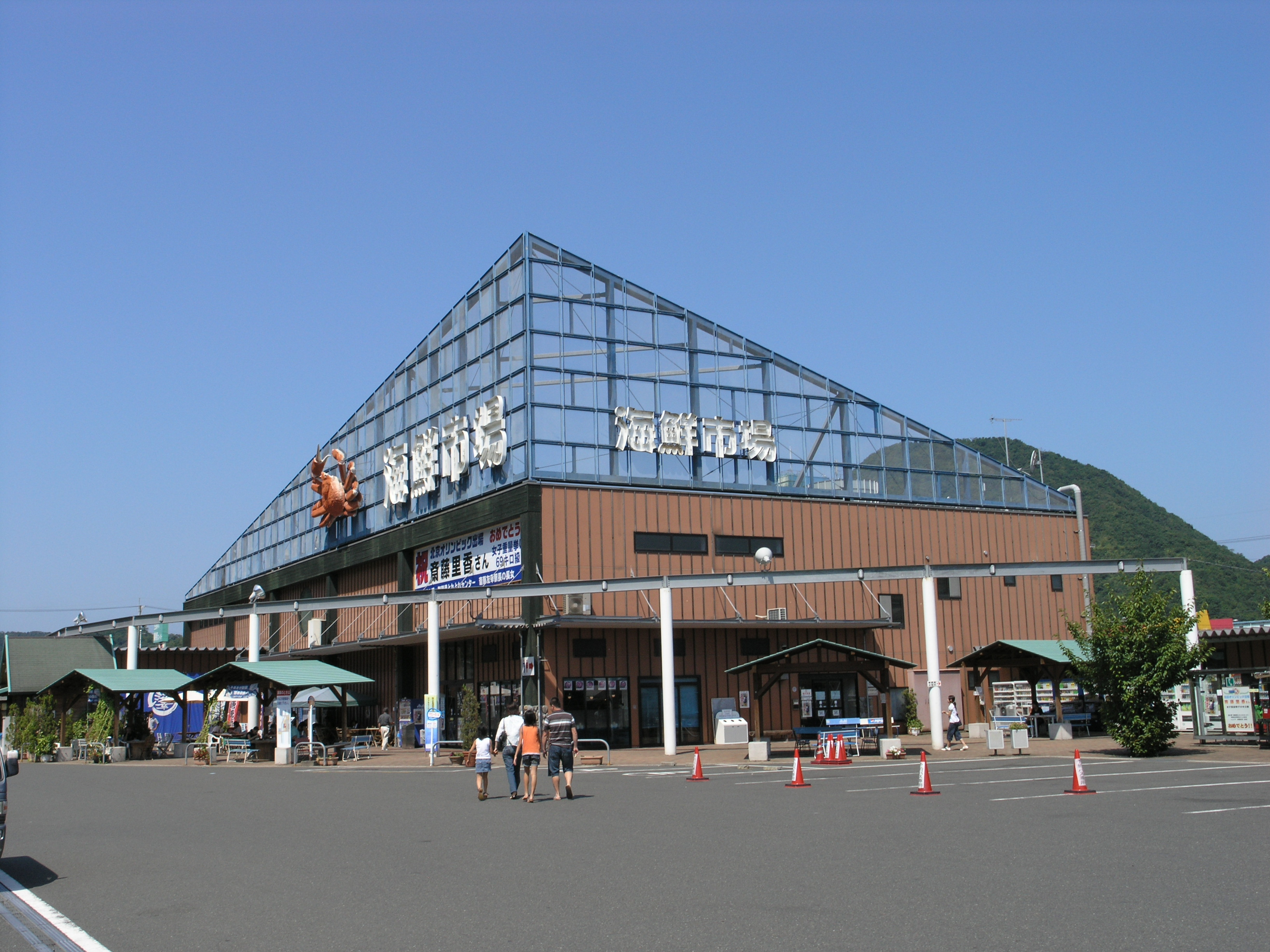

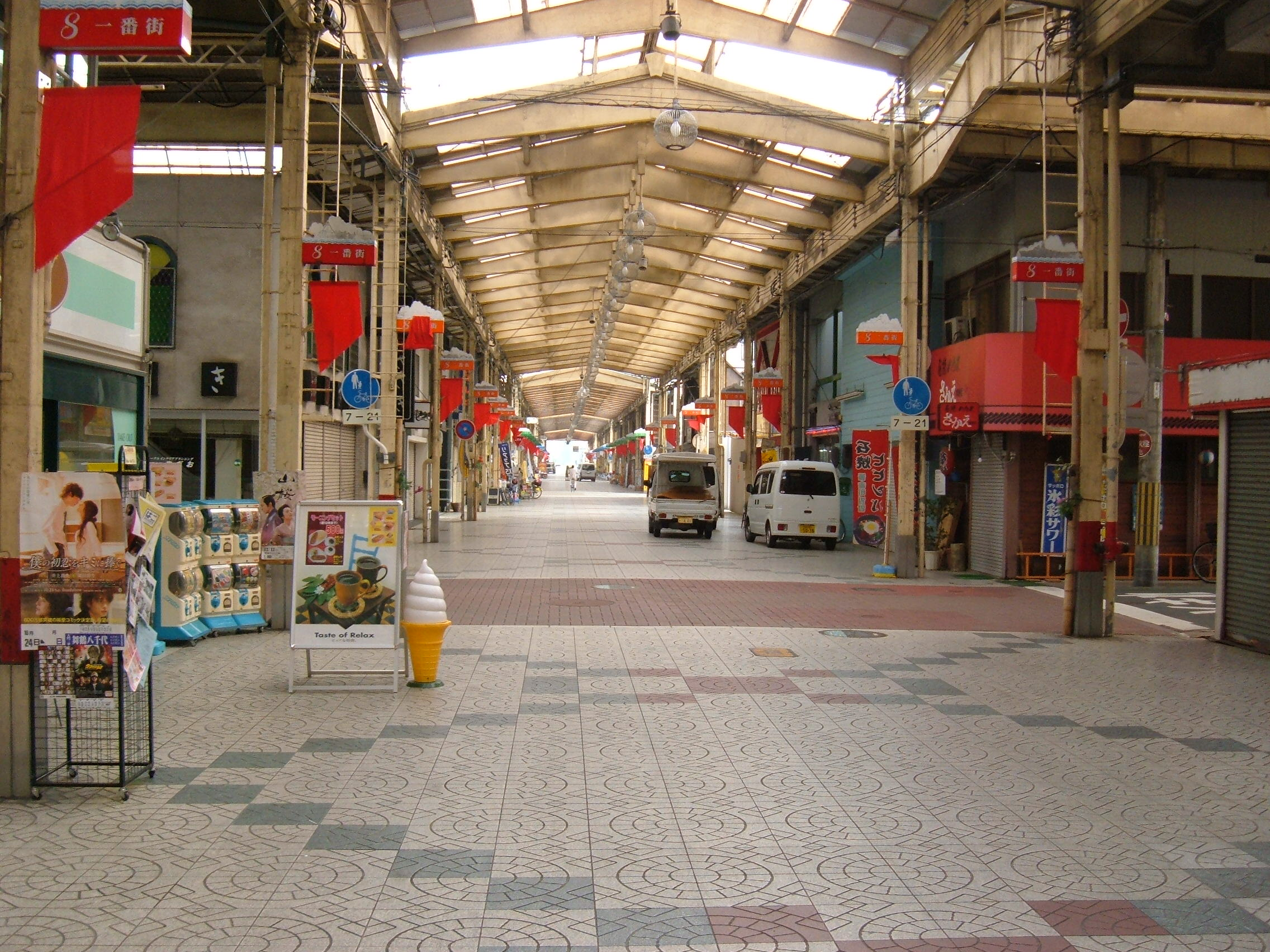

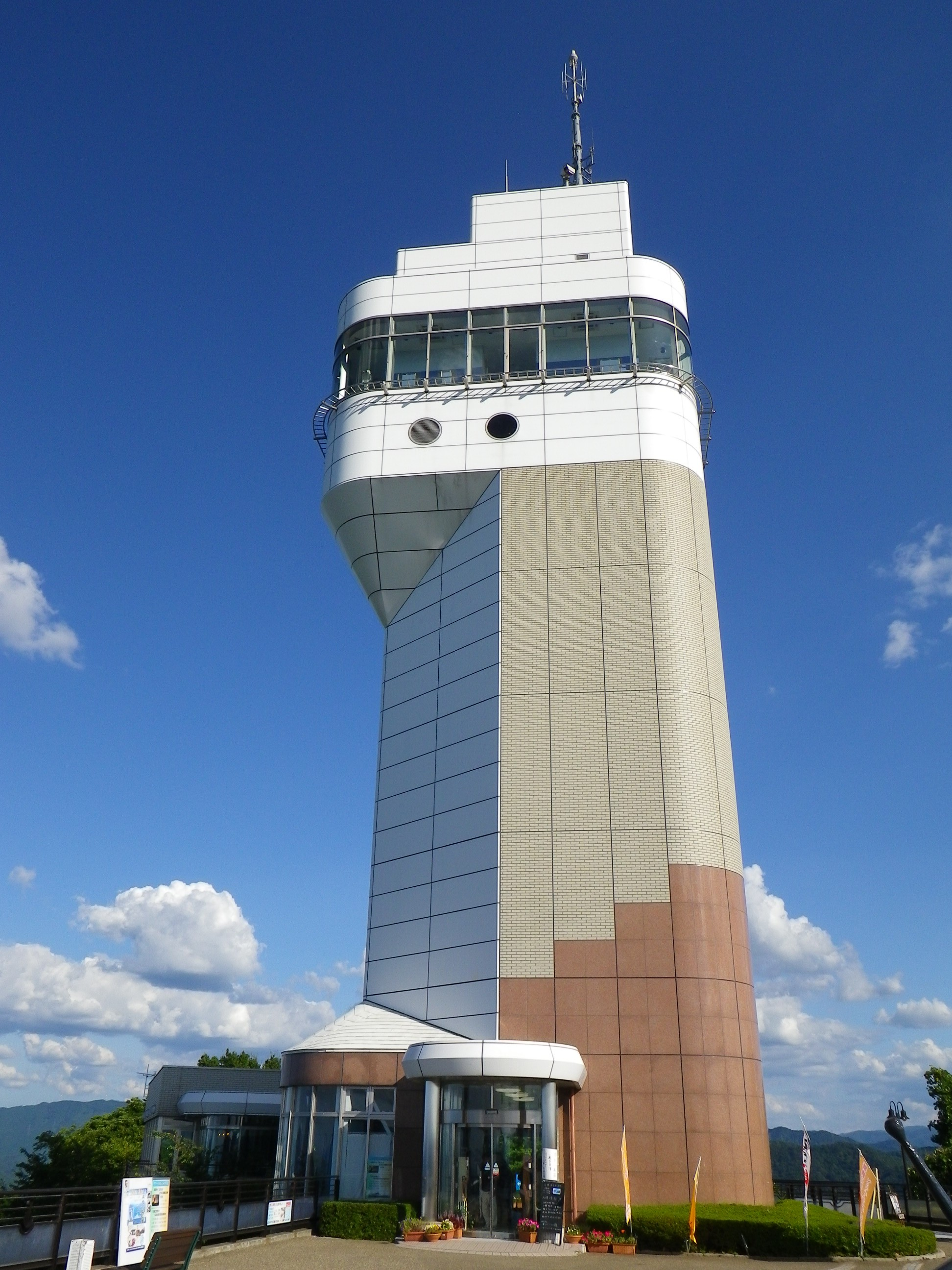

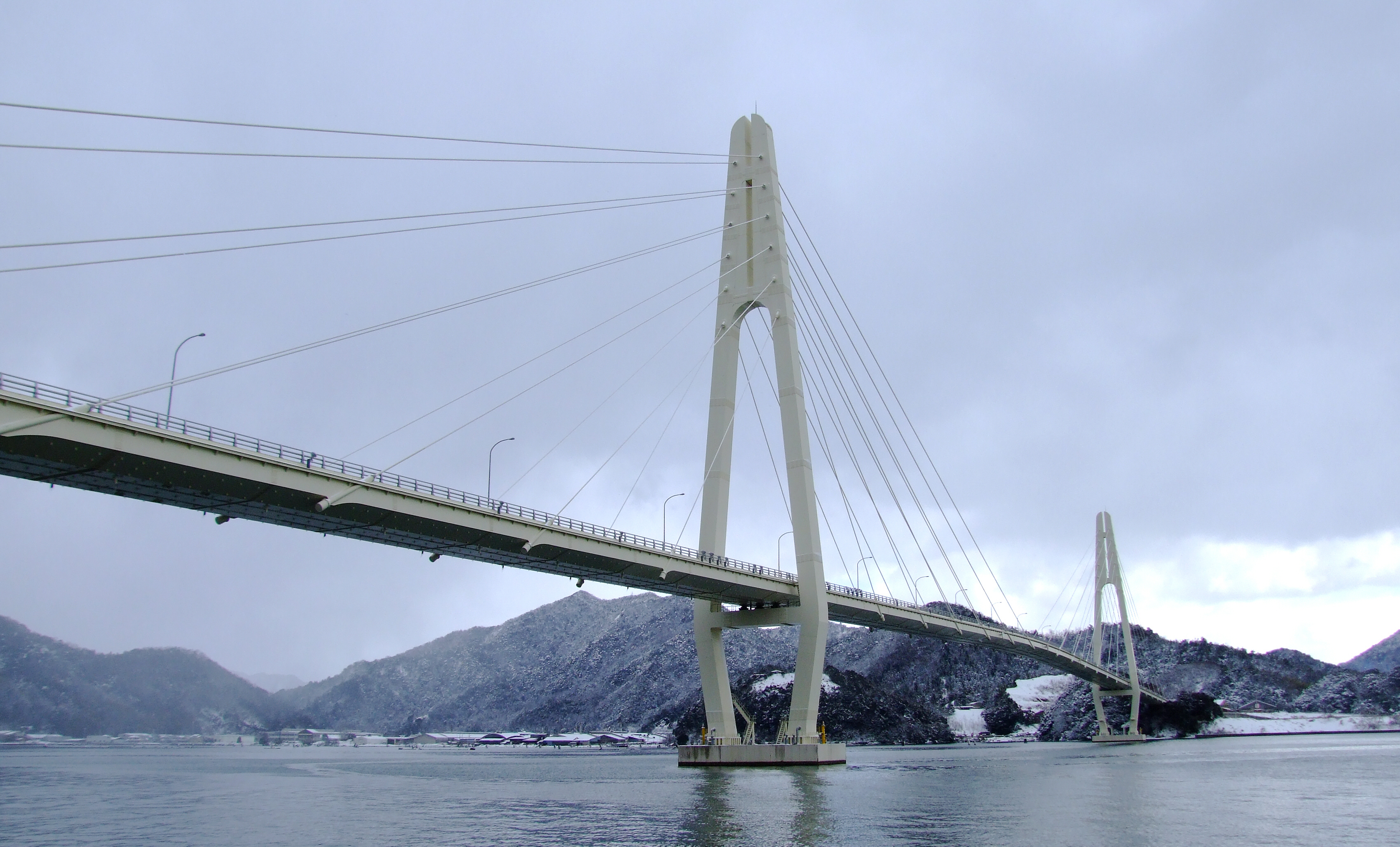
Maizuru red brick warehouses
Maizuru Castle	JMSDF Maizuru
Maizuru Port ToreTore Center	Yashima market, Higashi-Maizuru
Goro Sky tower	Maizuru Crane Bridge
- Flag Seal

- Location of Maizuru in Kyoto Prefecture

- Location in Japan
- Coordinates: 35°28′N 135°23′E
- Country: Japan
- Region: Kansai
- Prefecture: Kyoto
- Maizuru town settled: April 1, 1889
- Maizuru city settled: August 1, 1938
- Current city merged with East Maizuru city: May 27, 1943

Government
  - Mayor: Akitsu Kamota (鴨田秋津) - from February 2023

Area
  - Total: 342.13 km^{2} (132.10 sq mi)

Population (February 28, 2022)
  - Total: 78,644
  - Density: 229.87/km^{2} (595.35/sq mi)
- Time zone: UTC+09:00 (JST)
- City hall address: 1044 Kitasui, Maizuru-shi, Kyōto-fu 625-8555
- Climate: Cfa
- Website: Official website
- Symbols
- Flower: Azalea
- Tree: Japanese zelkova

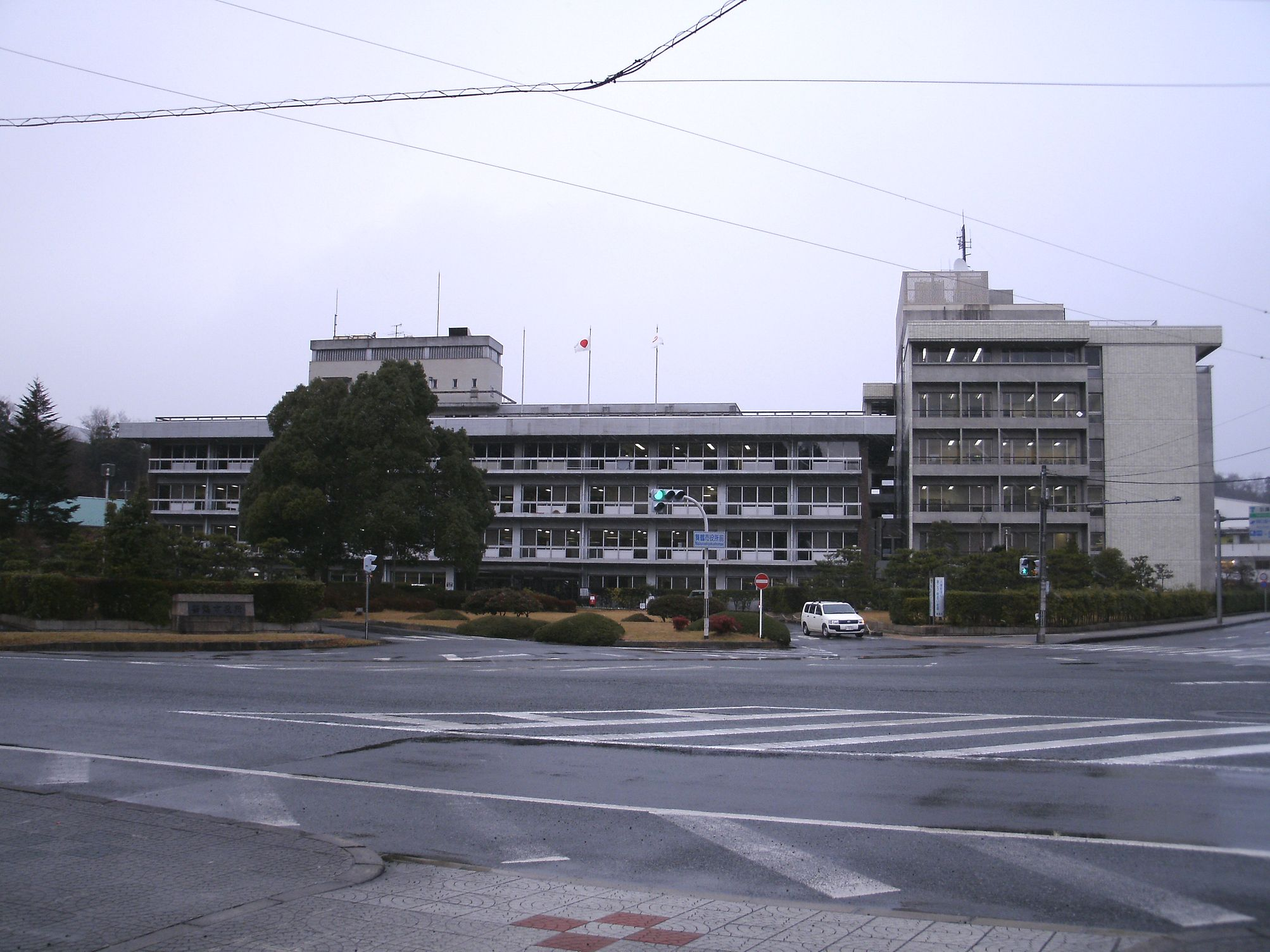
Maizuru City Hall

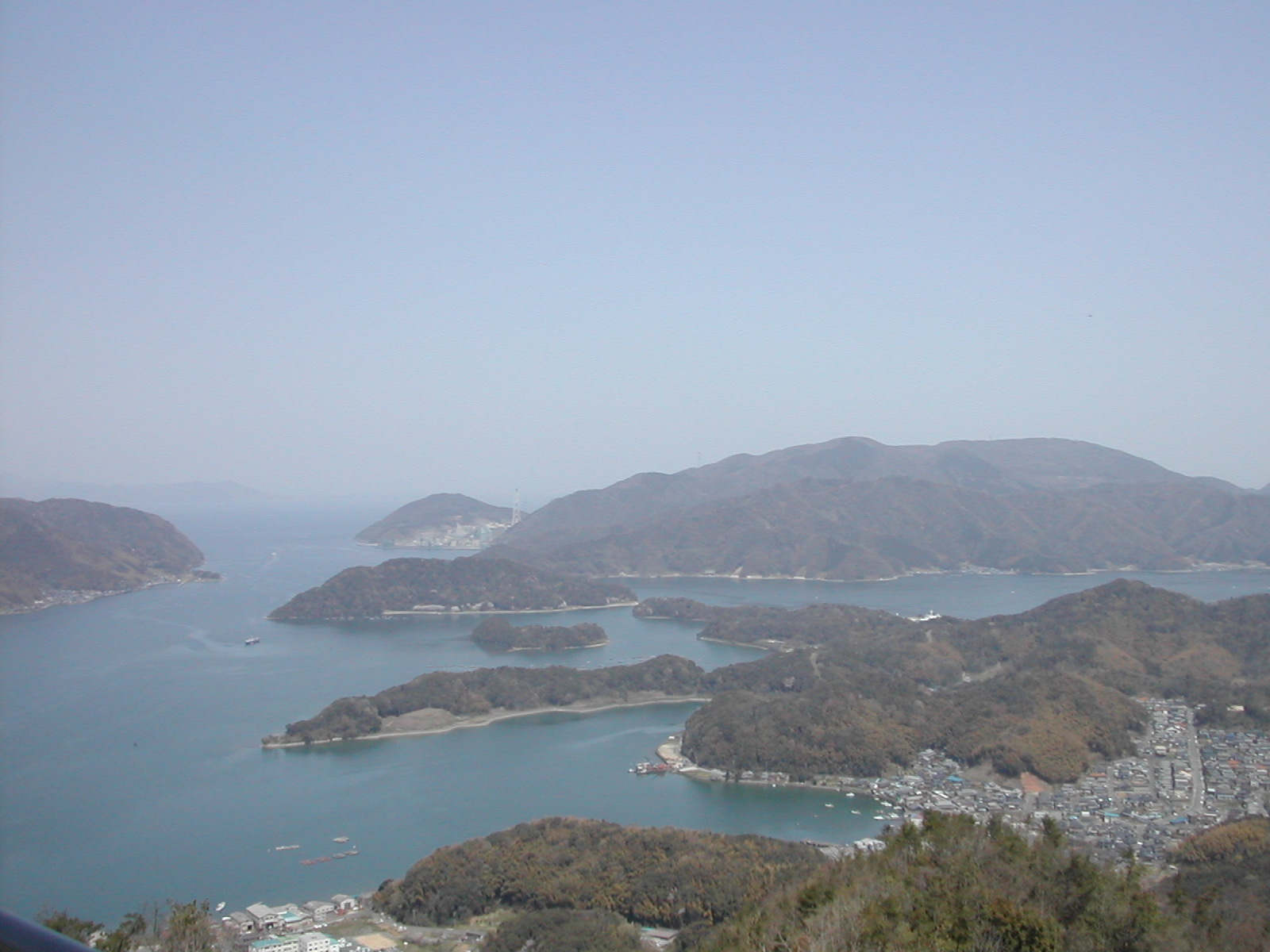
Maizuru Bay

Maizuru (舞鶴市, Maizuru-shi) is a city in Kyoto Prefecture, Japan. As of 28 February 2022, the city had an estimated population of 78,644 in 34,817 households and a population density of 230 persons per km^{2}. The total area of the city is 342.13 square kilometres (132.10 sq mi).

== Geography ==
Maizuru is located in northern Kyoto Prefecture, facing scenic Maizuru Bay on the Sea of Japan to the north and Fukui Prefecture to the east.

=== Neighboring municipalities ===
Fukui Prefecture

- Takahama

Kyoto Prefecture

- Ayabe
- Fukuchiyama
- Miyazu

=== Climate ===
Like Toyooka in Hyōgo Prefecture, Maizuru has a climate resembling the Hokuriku region rather than the rest of Kansai, though it is less wet than other Hokuriku towns during the late autumn and winter because its location on a deep inlet means the northerly winds driven by the Siberian High and Aleutian Low do not produce as much rain and/or snow. In the summer, however, Maizuru can be extremely oppressive as the intense radiation creates extreme humidity around the bay: on August 13, 1994 the town recorded a minimum temperature of 29 °C (84.2 °F).

Climate data for Maizuru (1991−2020 normals, extremes 1947−present)
Month	Jan	Feb	Mar	Apr	May	Jun	Jul	Aug	Sep	Oct	Nov	Dec	Year
Record high °C (°F)	19.4 (66.9)	22.9 (73.2)	26.0 (78.8)	32.6 (90.7)	34.6 (94.3)	37.1 (98.8)	38.8 (101.8)	39.0 (102.2)	38.3 (100.9)	31.4 (88.5)	26.3 (79.3)	22.9 (73.2)	39.0 (102.2)
Mean maximum °C (°F)	13.9 (57.0)	16.6 (61.9)	21.8 (71.2)	27.8 (82.0)	30.8 (87.4)	32.9 (91.2)	36.1 (97.0)	36.8 (98.2)	33.7 (92.7)	28.5 (83.3)	22.7 (72.9)	17.0 (62.6)	37.1 (98.8)
Mean daily maximum °C (°F)	7.6 (45.7)	8.5 (47.3)	12.7 (54.9)	18.6 (65.5)	23.6 (74.5)	26.6 (79.9)	30.7 (87.3)	32.4 (90.3)	27.6 (81.7)	22.0 (71.6)	16.2 (61.2)	10.4 (50.7)	19.7 (67.6)
Daily mean °C (°F)	3.7 (38.7)	4.1 (39.4)	7.4 (45.3)	12.7 (54.9)	17.8 (64.0)	21.6 (70.9)	25.9 (78.6)	27.1 (80.8)	22.9 (73.2)	17.0 (62.6)	11.3 (52.3)	6.2 (43.2)	14.8 (58.7)
Mean daily minimum °C (°F)	0.7 (33.3)	0.5 (32.9)	2.8 (37.0)	7.4 (45.3)	12.7 (54.9)	17.7 (63.9)	22.4 (72.3)	23.3 (73.9)	19.3 (66.7)	13.2 (55.8)	7.5 (45.5)	2.8 (37.0)	10.9 (51.5)
Mean minimum °C (°F)	−2.9 (26.8)	−2.9 (26.8)	−2.0 (28.4)	0.8 (33.4)	6.8 (44.2)	12.3 (54.1)	18.6 (65.5)	19.4 (66.9)	13.9 (57.0)	7.3 (45.1)	2.2 (36.0)	−1.2 (29.8)	−3.5 (25.7)
Record low °C (°F)	−8.0 (17.6)	−8.8 (16.2)	−6.2 (20.8)	−3.2 (26.2)	0.9 (33.6)	7.0 (44.6)	13.0 (55.4)	14.4 (57.9)	7.9 (46.2)	2.5 (36.5)	−1.7 (28.9)	−6.7 (19.9)	−8.8 (16.2)
Average precipitation mm (inches)	183.4 (7.22)	146.6 (5.77)	140.5 (5.53)	116.6 (4.59)	142.8 (5.62)	154.9 (6.10)	192.6 (7.58)	149.6 (5.89)	238.3 (9.38)	179.9 (7.08)	132.5 (5.22)	163.6 (6.44)	1,941.2 (76.43)
Average snowfall cm (inches)	54 (21)	49 (19)	9 (3.5)	0 (0)	0 (0)	0 (0)	0 (0)	0 (0)	0 (0)	0 (0)	0 (0)	24 (9.4)	135 (53)
Average precipitation days (≥ 1.0 mm)	18.7	15.9	15.1	11.4	10.0	10.7	12.2	9.3	12.0	11.4	12.7	16.7	156.1
Average snowy days (≥ 1 cm)	8.9	7.9	2.0	0	0	0	0	0	0	0	0	3.6	22.4
Average relative humidity (%)	82	79	74	71	71	77	78	76	79	79	80	82	77
Mean monthly sunshine hours	72.1	82.5	123.0	165.3	182.9	136.0	151.2	194.7	134.5	128.6	101.3	80.4	1,552.4
Source: Japan Meteorological Agency

== Demographics ==
Per Japanese census data, the population of Maizuru has declined gradually over the past 30 years.

Historical population

Year	Pop.	±%
1920	78,925	—
1925	72,026	−8.7%
1930	73,180	+1.6%
1935	77,632	+6.1%
1940	95,362	+22.8%
1945	102,350	+7.3%
1950	102,158	−0.2%
1955	102,588	+0.4%
1960	99,615	−2.9%
1965	96,641	−3.0%
1970	95,895	−0.8%

Year	Pop.	±%
1975	97,780	+2.0%
1980	97,578	−0.2%
1985	98,775	+1.2%
1990	96,333	−2.5%
1995	94,784	−1.6%
2000	94,050	−0.8%
2005	91,733	−2.5%
2010	88,669	−3.3%
2015	83,990	−5.3%
2020	80,336	−4.4%

Maizuru population statistics

== History ==
The area of Maizuru has been inhabited since prehistoric times, and numerous traces of Jomon and Yayoi period settlements have been discovered by archaeologists. The Yura River valley in particular was densely populated, and many kofun burial mounds have been found. The area became part of Tango Province in the Nara period. During the Muromachi period, the Isshiki clan ruled as shugo of the province, but were replaced in the Sengoku period with the Hosokawa clan, who constructed Tanabe Castle, whose nickname "Maizuru Castle" was later adopted as the name of the city. Following the Battle of Sekigahara, Tokugawa Ieyasu awarded the entire province of Tango to Kyōgoku Takatomo, who established Miyazu Domain. To ensure the succession of his line, Kyōgoku Takatomo gave 35,000 koku of his holdings to his third son, Kyōgoku Takamitsu, and established a cadet branch of the clan at Tango-Tanabe Domain, based at Maizuru Castle. The Kyōgoku were replaced by a cadet branch of the Makino clan, who ruled until the Meiji restoration in 1871. The town of Maizuru was established with the creation of the modern municipalities system on April 1, 1889. The same year, the Maizuru Naval District was created and the associated Maizuru Naval Arsenal for ship basing, construction, and repair was created in 1901. In the Russo-Japanese War, many warships were based there, due to its proximity to the Sea of Japan. Maizuru was raised to city status on August 1, 1938.

After the Second World War, Maizuru was a key port for returning Japanese servicemen and detainees from continental Asia for over 13 years. Today, JMSDF Maizuru Naval Base is a key district headquarters for the Japan Maritime Self-Defense Force.

== Government ==
Maizuru has a mayor-council form of government with a directly elected mayor and a unicameral city council of 26 members. Maizuru contributes two members to the Kyoto Prefectural Assembly. In terms of national politics, the city is part of Kyoto 5th district of the lower house of the Diet of Japan.

== Economy ==
Maizuru has a mixed economy, with commerce, agriculture, forestry, tourism and commercial fishing all playing major roles. Industry, centered on wood processing and shipbuilding, have declined severely due to overseas competition, but Japan Marine United, a large shipbuilding corporation, has one of its main shipyards in Maizuru.

== Education ==
=== Colleges and universities ===
- Kyoto University - Maizuru Fisheries Research Station
- Japan Coast Guard School
- National Institute of Technology, Maizuru campus

=== Primary and secondary education ===
Maizuru has 20 public elementary schools and seven public middle schools operated by the town government and two public high schools operated by the Kyoto Prefectural Department of Education. There is also one private high school.

The community previously had a North Korean school, Maizuru Korean Elementary and Junior High School (舞鶴朝鮮初中級学校).

== Transportation ==
=== Railways ===
JR West – Maizuru Line

- Magura - Nishi-Maizuru - Higashi-Maizuru

JR West – Obama Line

- Matsunoodera - Higashi-Maizuru

Kyoto Tango Railway – Miyazu Line

- Nishi-Maizuru - Shisho - Shinonome - Tango-Kanzaki

=== Highways ===
- Maizuru-Wakasa Expressway
- Kyoto Jūkan Expressway
- National Route 27
- National Route 175
- National Route 177
- National Route 178

=== Ferry ===
- Shin-Nikon-Kai ferry to Otaru, Hokkaido

== International town twinnings and exchange partnership ==
- - Nakhodka, Primorsky Krai, Russia in June 1961, the first Russian - Japanese sister towns in history.
- - Dalian, Liaoning, China since 1982
- (United Kingdom) - Portsmouth, Hampshire, England since 1998.
- - Rishtan, Fergana region, Uzbekistan since 2019.

== Local attractions ==
Maizuru is dotted with sightseeing spots. There is Maizuru Repatriation Memorial Museum, a commemorative hall which documents the return of half a million servicemen and detainees from Soviet internment, and an observatory which overlooks the Rias seashore of the Maizuru Bay.

== Notable people from Maizuru ==
- Arisa Inoue, Japanese volleyball player (Hisamitsu Springs and Japan women's national volleyball team)
- Tatsuya Ishihara, Japanese television and film director (Kyoto Animation)
- Kazuki Maehara, former actor, known for his role as Ryoma in Seijuu Sentai Gingaman
- Kengo Mashimo, Japanese professional wrestler (Active Advance Pro Wrestling)
- Hatsuho Matsuzawa, Japanese swimmer
- Mamoru Nagano, Japanese manga artist, animator, and mecha and character designer
- Mai Ohara, Japanese politician who served in the House of Representatives of Japan
- Shosei Ohira, Japanese singer and dancer, member of JO1
- Jin Ueda, Japanese table tennis player
- Yuki Yamaguchi, former Japanese sprinter who specialised in the 400 metres
