= List of highways numbered 179 =

The following highways are numbered 179:

== Canada ==
- Prince Edward Island Route 179

== Ireland ==
- R179 road (Ireland)

== Japan ==
- Japan National Route 179

== Malaysia ==
- FT 179 Malaysia Federal Route 179

== United Kingdom ==
- A179 road
- B179 road

== United States ==
- Interstate 179 (former)
- Alabama State Route 179
- Arizona State Route 179
- Arkansas Highway 179
- California State Route 179
- Connecticut Route 179
- Florida State Road 179 (former)
- Georgia State Route 179 (former)
- Illinois Route 179 (former)
- K-179 (Kansas highway)
- Kentucky Route 179
- Maine State Route 179
- Maryland Route 179
- M-179 (Michigan highway)
- Missouri Route 179
- New Jersey Route 179
- New Mexico State Road 179
- New York State Route 179
- North Carolina Highway 179
- Ohio State Route 179
- Pennsylvania Route 179
- Rhode Island Route 179
- South Carolina Highway 179
- Tennessee State Route 179
- Texas State Highway 179
  - Texas State Highway Loop 179
  - Farm to Market Road 179 (Texas)
- Utah State Route 179 (former)
- Virginia State Route 179
- Wisconsin Highway 179

Territories

- Puerto Rico Highway 179

| Preceded by 178 | Lists of highways 179 | Succeeded by 180 |
