= USS O'Bannon (DD-987) =

Spruance-class destroyer

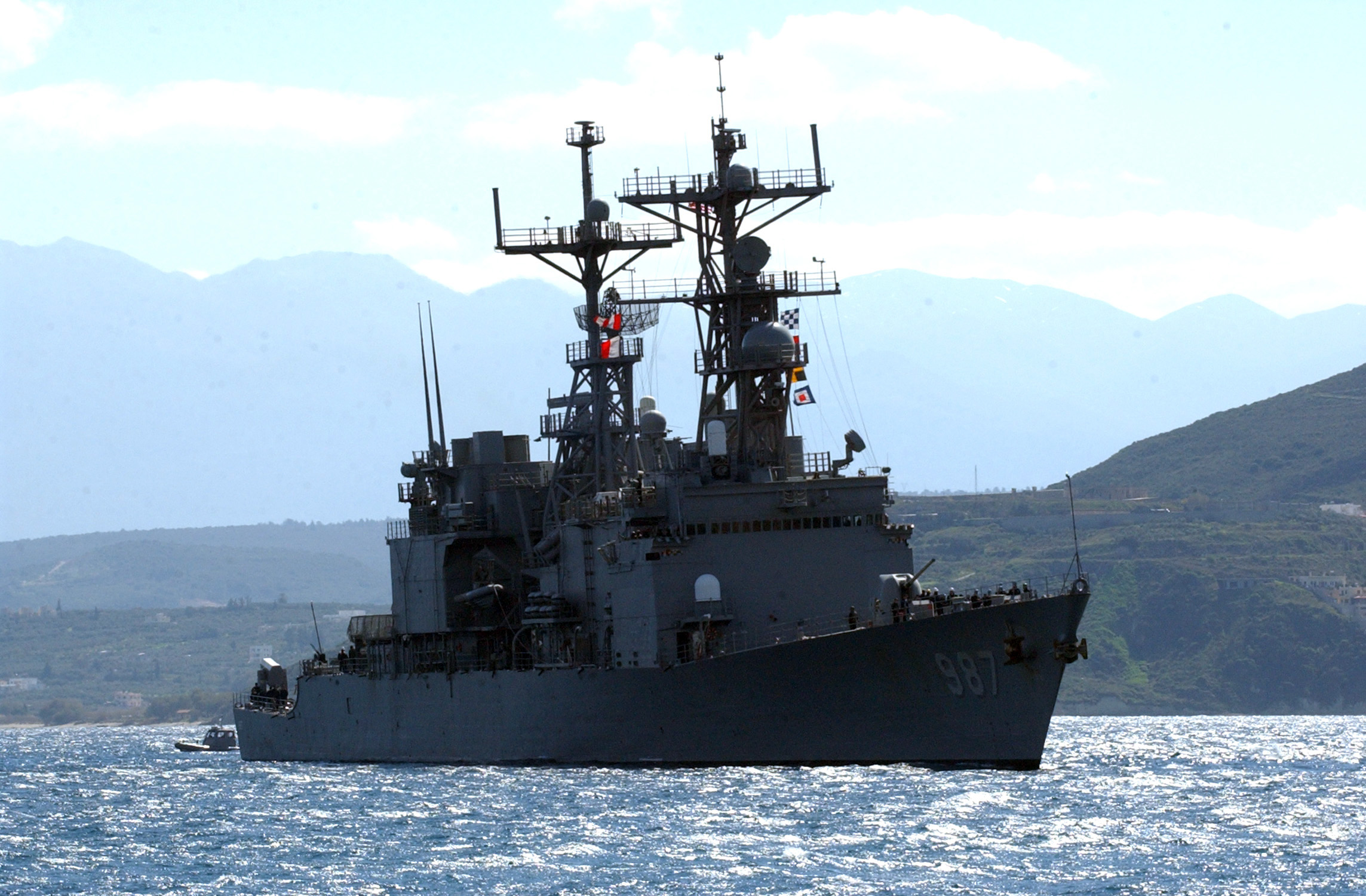
- USS O'Bannon in Souda Harbor on 3 March 2005

History

United States
- Name: O'Bannon
- Namesake: Presley O'Bannon
- Ordered: 15 January 1975
- Builder: Ingalls Shipbuilding
- Laid down: 21 February 1977
- Launched: 25 September 1978
- Commissioned: 15 December 1979
- Decommissioned: 19 August 2005
- Stricken: 19 August 2005
- Identification: Callsign: NTLW; Hull number: DD-987
- Motto: Discipline, Pride, Performance
- Fate: Sunk as target, 6 October 2008
- Badge

General characteristics
- Class & type: Spruance-class destroyer
- Displacement: 8,040 long tons (8,170 t) full load
- Length: 529 ft (161 m) waterline; 563 ft (172 m) overall
- Beam: 55 ft (17 m)
- Draft: 29 ft (8.8 m)
- Installed power: 3 × 501-K17 generator sets (2,000 kW (2,700 hp) each)
- Propulsion: 4 × General Electric LM2500 gas turbines, 2 shafts, 80,000 shp (60 MW)
- Speed: 32.5 knots (60.2 km/h; 37.4 mph)
- Range: 6,000 nmi (11,000 km; 6,900 mi) at 20 knots (37 km/h; 23 mph)
- Complement: 19 officers, 315 enlisted
- Sensors & processing systems: AN/SPS-40 air search radar; AN/SPG-60 fire control radar; AN/SPS-55 surface search radar; AN/SPQ-9 gun fire control radar; Mark 23 TAS automatic detection and tracking radar; AN/SPS-65 missile fire control radar; AN/SQS-53 bow-mounted active sonar; AN/SQR-19 TACTAS towed array passive sonar; Naval Tactical Data System
- Electronic warfare & decoys: AN/SLQ-32 electronic warfare system; AN/SLQ-25 Nixie torpedo countermeasures; Mark 36 SRBOC decoy launching system; AN/SLQ-49 inflatable decoys
- Armament: 2 × 5 in (127 mm) 54 caliber Mark 45 dual purpose guns; 2 × 20 mm Phalanx CIWS Mark 15 guns; 1 × 8 cell ASROC launcher (removed); 1 × 8 cell NATO Sea Sparrow Mark 29 missile launcher; 2 × quadruple Harpoon missile canisters; 2 × Mark 32 triple 12.75 in (324 mm) torpedo tubes (Mk 46 torpedoes); 1 × 61 cell Mk 41 VLS launcher for Tomahawk missiles; 1 × 21 cell RIM-116 Rolling Airframe Missile
- Aircraft carried: 2 × Sikorsky SH-60 Seahawk LAMPS III helicopters
- Aviation facilities: Flight deck and enclosed hangar for up to two medium-lift helicopters

USS O'Bannon (DD-987), a Spruance-class destroyer, was the third ship of the United States Navy to be named for Lieutenant Presley O'Bannon (1776–1850), an early hero of the US Marine Corps.

O'Bannon was laid down on 21 February 1977 by the Ingalls Shipbuilding, Pascagoula, Miss.; launched on 25 September 1978; and commissioned on 15 December 1979.

== History ==
The third O'Bannon was laid down on 24 June 1977, at Pascagoula, Miss., by Ingalls Shipbuilding; launched on 25 September 1978 and sponsored by Mrs. Patricia H. Barrow, wife of General Robert H. Barrow, Commandant Marine Corps; and commissioned on 15 December 1979 in Pascagoula.

O'Bannon got underway from Pascagoula for her homeport at Charleston, S.C., arriving on 21 December 1979. Assigned to Destroyer Squadron (DesRon) 4, O'Bannon steamed to Ft. Lauderdale, Fl., from 29 January-3 February 1980, returning to Charleston on 7 April.

On 21 April 1980, O'Bannon got underway for a retrofit availability in Pascagoula, from 21 April-18 July. During her retrofit, she received a reassignment to DesRon 6 on 1 July. The destroyer received the latest weapons and technology, including an eight canister Harpoon missile system and an AN-SLQ-32(V)2 Electronic Warfare (EW) system. O'Bannon got underway for her first full refresher training in Guantánamo Bay, Cuba, on 2 September 1980. After holding refresher training (1 October-4 November), she participated in naval gunfire support qualifications on 7 November.

On 18 March 1981, O'Bannon departed her homeport of Charleston for her first Mediterranean/North Atlantic deployment. O'Bannon conducted an Intermediate Maintenance Activity Availability (IMAV) period from 16 to 24 July alongside Puget Sound (AD-38), flagship of Commander Sixth Fleet. From 18 to 19 August, she participated in a freedom of navigation (FON) exercise off the coast of Libya. Getting underway for Charleston, O'Bannon crossed the Arctic Circle on 1 September, holding the traditional Order of the Blue Nose ceremony.

O'Bannon participated on 9 April 1982 in readiness exercise (READIEX) 2-82 and Exercise Ocean Venture before making a port call at San Juan, P.R. (15-18 April). After further training in the Caribbean, the destroyer headed south, crossing the equator on 10 August and holding the traditional "cross-the-line" ceremonies. Making way for South America, she made several port calls in Latin American countries throughout October–November before steaming to Africa for a West-African Training Cruise (WATC).

O'Bannon steamed back for her homeport of Charleston by the end of the year. In May 1984 she took to sea as a participant in the North Atlantic Treaty Organization Tour visiting Germany, England, Netherlands, and other NATO alliances. Again participating in the traditional 'Blue Nose' ceremony while crossing the Arctic Circle before returning to Maine for Dry Dock repairs and updates. in 1985 she returned across the Atlantic with a stop in Azores for multiple assignments in the Mediterranean-Indian Ocean-Persian Gulf. The US Navy began several "Freedom of Navigation" operations in the area around Libya. The O'Bannon participated in the third operation beginning on March 23 with an armada from the United States Sixth Fleet consisting of three aircraft carriers - USS America (CV-66), USS Coral Sea (CV-43) and USS Saratoga (CV-60); five cruisers, six frigates, 12 destroyers, 250 aircraft and 27,000 personnel conducting three carrier operations near the gulf. From November 1985 through June 1987 the O'Bannon made several trips from the Mediterranean and Gulf to home port.

O'Bannon returned to being a ship-of-the-line with the formation of the rehabilitation team to refurbish all of her berthing areas. On 6 October 1986, she got underway for a six-month deployment to the Persian Gulf, returning to Charleston on 6 April 1987. O'Bannon was part of the Middle East Task Force assigned to patrol off the Saudi Arabian coast near the Iran–Iraq War exclusion boundary and was released by the USS Stark. The O'Bannon had barely returned to her dock in Charleston when with the USS Stark incident occurred.

After participating in New York City's Fleet Week, from 19 to 25 April 1988, O'Bannon remained in Charleston most of the rest of the year, with short deployments to the Caribbean. She got underway for a Mediterranean/Middle East deployment from 5 December 1988 – 21 July 1989.

Underway from her homeport at Charleston, O'Bannon participated in Square Shooter Exercise on 24 January 1991, before conducting a port visit to Boston (21-23 February). O'Bannon departed Charleston on 1 July 1991 to serve as the flagship of U.S. Navy forces participating in UNITAS XXXII, a combined exercise involving the naval forces of the United States and eight South American nations. RDML (lower half) Theodore C. Lockhart, U.S. Navy, commander, South Atlantic Force was embarked as the commander of United States units taking part in the multinational naval exercise. O'Bannon also embarked Helicopter Antisubmarine Squadron (Light) 34 Detachment 6 with their SH-2F Seasprite helicopter, as well as a BQM-74C target drone detachment from Fleet Composite Squadron 6. On 1 August, she transited the Panama Canal, crossing the equator a week later, and transited the Straights of Magellan on 4 October. After 17 port calls in South America and the Caribbean, O'Bannon arrived back at her homeport on 13 December.

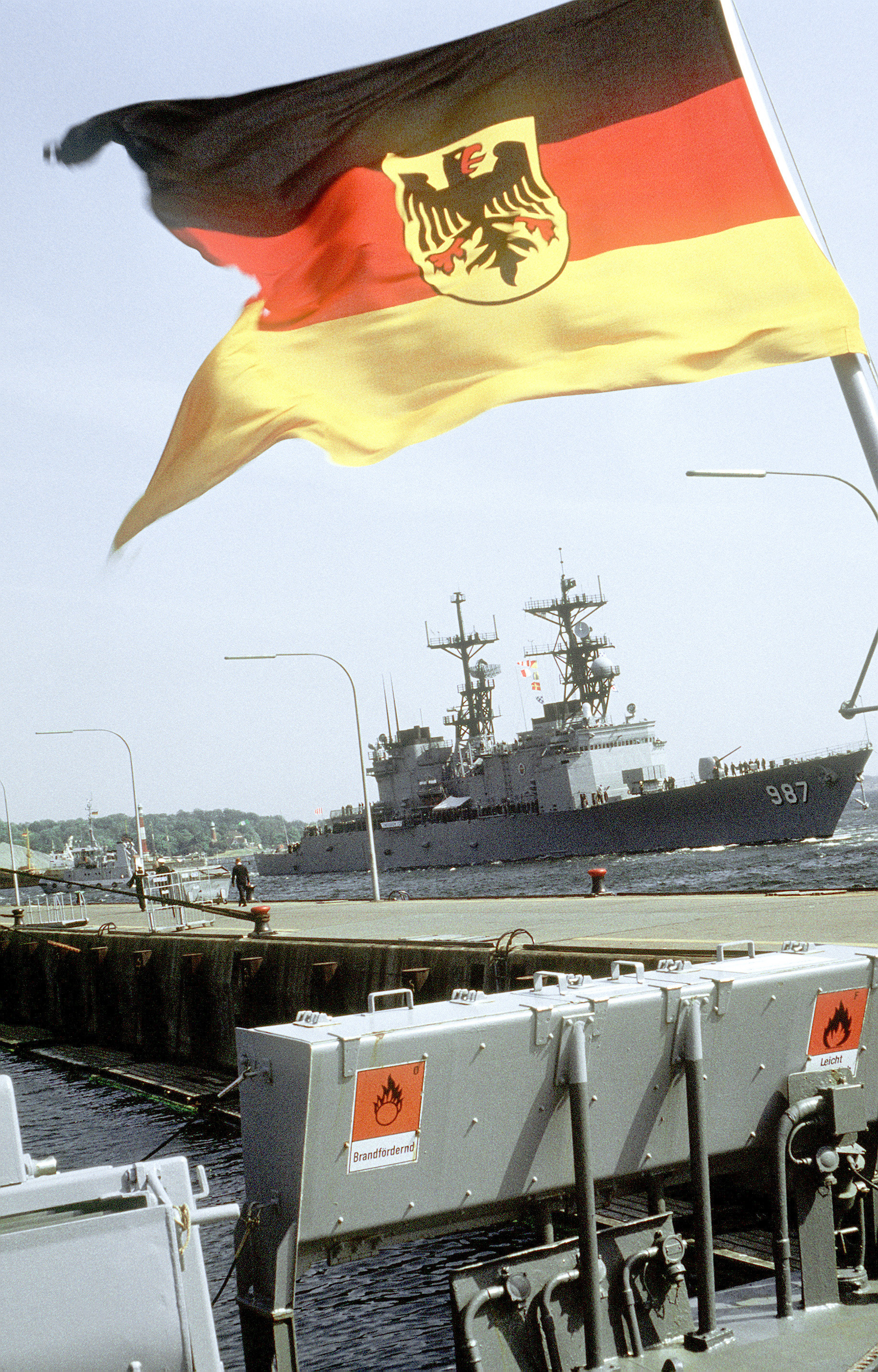
USS O'Bannon at Kiel in 1992

O'Bannon remained in Charleston until April, steaming out to participate in Ocean Venture 92 from 1 to 9 May 1992. On 5 July, O'Bannon and Yorktown (CG-48) became the first U.S. Navy ships to make a port visit to Severomorsk, homeport of the Russian Northern Fleet. This was also the first port call by a U.S. naval ship anywhere in Russia since the break-up of the Soviet Union. The destroyer attained the highest standards of battle readiness, receiving the Battle Efficiency "E" award and Command Excellence Awards for Maritime Warfare during that year.

O'Bannon remained in dry dock at the Charleston Naval Shipyard from 1 January-7 July 1993. On 18 November, the destroyer went smoke free, banning smoking within the skin of the ship and allowing it on the weather deck only. After a regular overhaul from 1 January-1 April 1994, O'Bannon participated in New York City's Fleet Week 94. Her homeport shifted from Charleston, S.C., to Mayport, Fl., on 1 October.

From 3 March-22 August 1995, O'Bannon steamed to the Mediterranean for a six-month deployment. On 1 September, she was detached from DesRon 8 and reassigned to DesRon 24 as part of the reorganization of the U.S. Atlantic Fleet.

Spending most of January–December 1998 moored at her homeport of Mayport, O'Bannon sortied out on 11 June to participate in Sea-Launched Attack Missile Exercise (SLAMEX) 33–98, and remained underway for sea trials from 24 to 26 June. From 1 to 18 December, O'Bannon got underway with DesRon 14 to participate in patrol duties in the Persian Gulf as part of Operation SOUTHERN WATCH, before steaming to San Juan, P.R., for a port visit from 9 to 11 December.

In January 2000, while acting as flagship for DesRon 14, O'Bannon spearheaded a group sail involving several maneuvering, weapons, and tactical exercises. From 9 to 14 June, she participated in an antisubmarine warfare exercise. On 15 December, O'Bannon's 22nd birthday, she steamed from Mayport to commence her U.S. Southern Command (SouthCom) deployment, later transiting the Panama Canal before entering the Pacific on 26 December to commence counter-narcotics operations.

Continuing her counter-narcotics operations into February 2001, O'Bannon returned to her homeport on 1 March before transiting up the St. John's River to the Atlantic Dry dock facility to complete emergent repairs for a week. From 2 to 4 May, the destroyer participated in a bilateral exercise with the Peruvian Navy and Coast Guard, consisting of boarding operations and maritime interdiction. From October–December, O'Bannon received repairs in the Atlantic Dry dock Facility, and spent the holidays at her homeport.

After a two-week upkeep period from 1 to 17 January 2003, O'Bannon deployed to the Caribbean for the rest of the month. The destroyer participated in counter-narcotics operations in the western Caribbean from February–July, before steaming out for brief underway periods to conduct training exercises through early December. Transiting the Gulf of Mexico from 6 to 7 December, O'Bannon celebrated the holidays in port from 16 December 2003 – 12 January 2004.

From 14 to 15 August 2004, O'Bannon participated in a passing exercise (PASSEX) off the Florida coast. She began a routine six-month deployment to the Mediterranean on 29 November, in chopping from Second Fleet to Sixth Fleet on 2 December. On 15 December, O'Bannon celebrated 25 years of service while also remaining only one of five Spruance-class destroyers left in the U.S. Navy.

On 25 April 2005, O'Bannon assisted two crewmembers on board a 45-foot fishing vessel in the Mediterranean Sea, after receiving a distress signal and sighting an emergency flare from the fishing vessel off Corsica.

=== Fate ===
Originally scheduled to remain in service through 2010, decommissioning of the Spruance-class destroyers was accelerated as a cost-saving measure, and by June 2005 O'Bannon was the last Spruance destroyer in service in the Atlantic Fleet.

O'Bannon was decommissioned on 19 August 2005 and struck from the Naval Vessel Register the same day. In 2004 O'Bannon was to be sold to Chile, but in 2005 she was scheduled to be transferred via FMS to the Turkish Navy. In the end she was sunk off the coast of Virginia at 3:23pm on 6 October 2008 in a training exercise by the USS Dwight D. Eisenhower carrier group, using missiles, guns and finally a Mk 82 bomb.

=== Awards ===
- Joint Meritorious Unit Award - (Aug-Oct 1990)
- Navy Unit Commendation - (Oct 1997-Apr 1998) FIFTH FLEET BATTLE FORCE
- Navy Meritorious Unit Commendation - (Sep 1994-Mar 1995) Operation Uphold Democracy
- Battle "E" - (1993, 1996)
- Navy Expeditionary Medal - (Feb-Mar 1987)
- Coast Guard Special Operations Service Ribbon - (Oct-Dec 1987, Jul-Sep 1988)

== Gallery ==
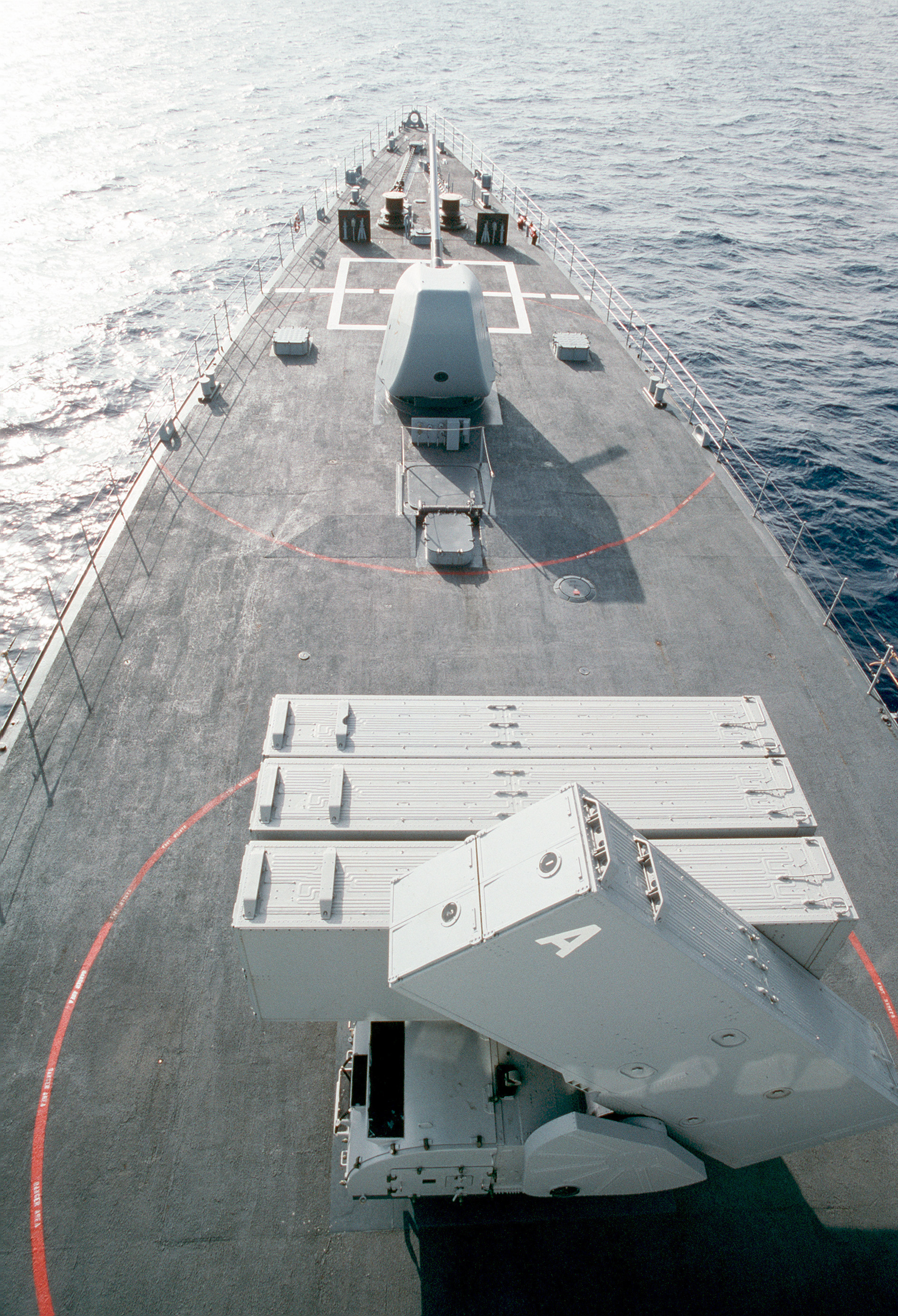
USS O'Bannon on 13 July 1991

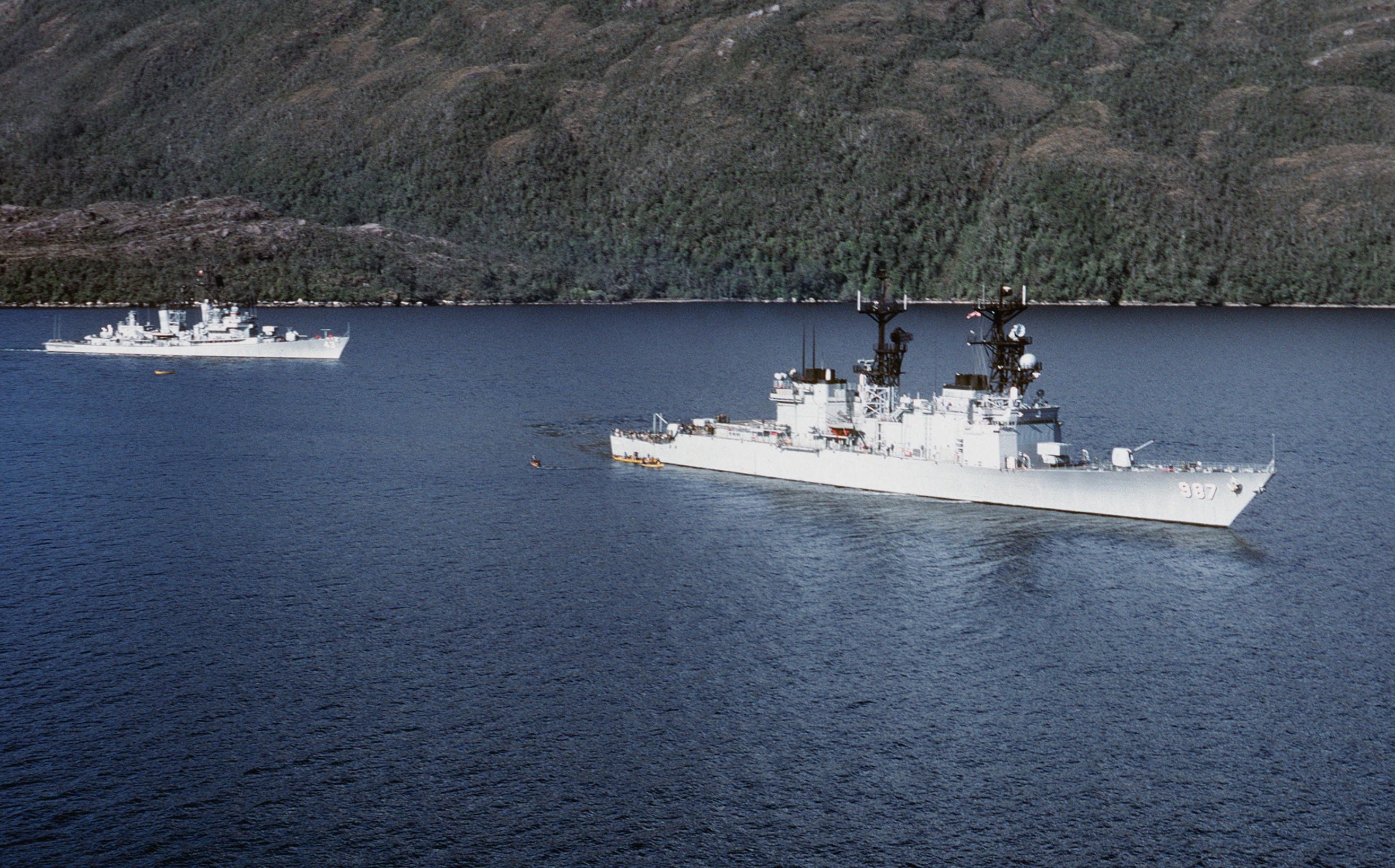
USS O'Bannon and USS Dahlgren on 1 September 1991

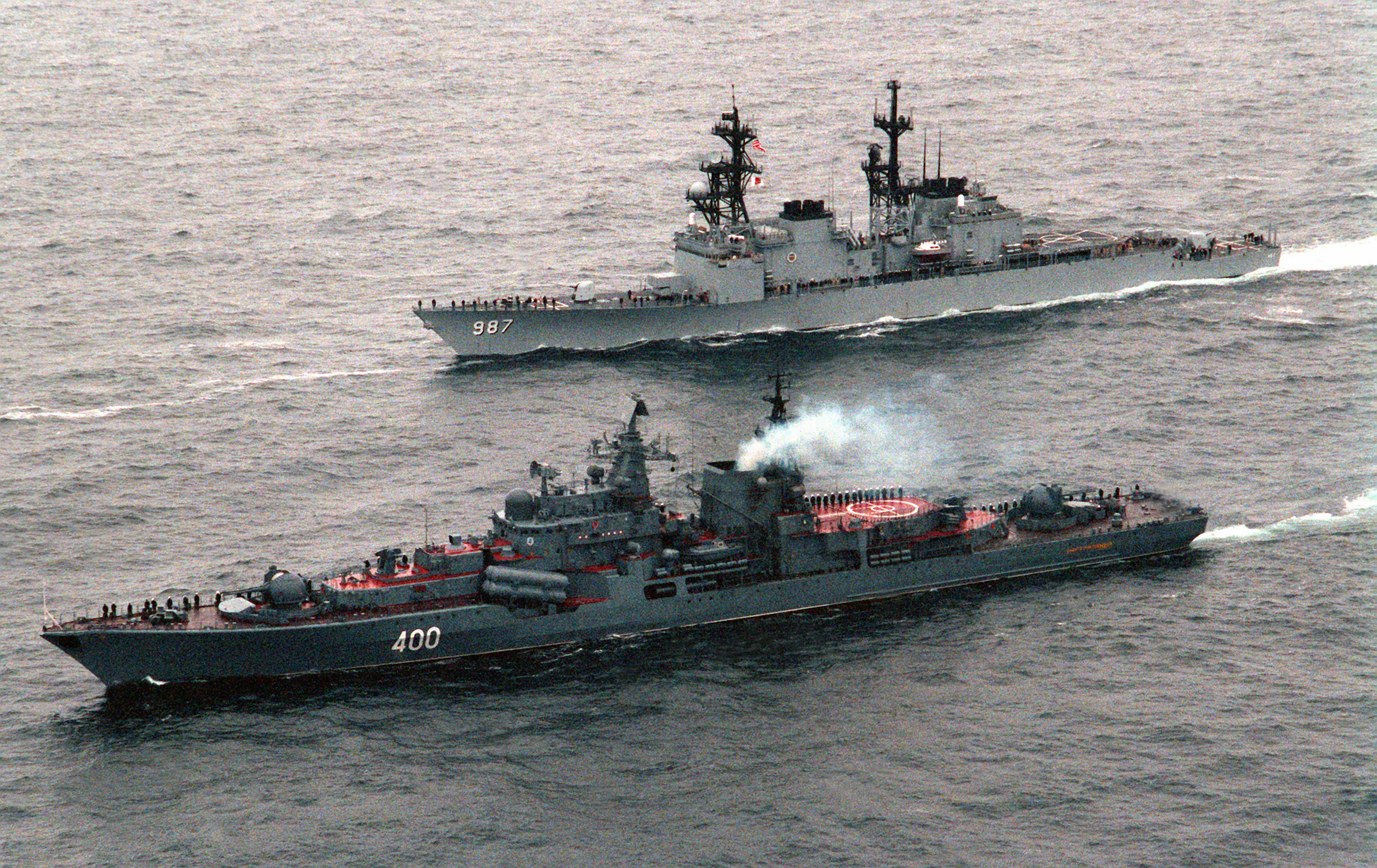
USS O'Bannon and Rastoropny on 1 July 1992

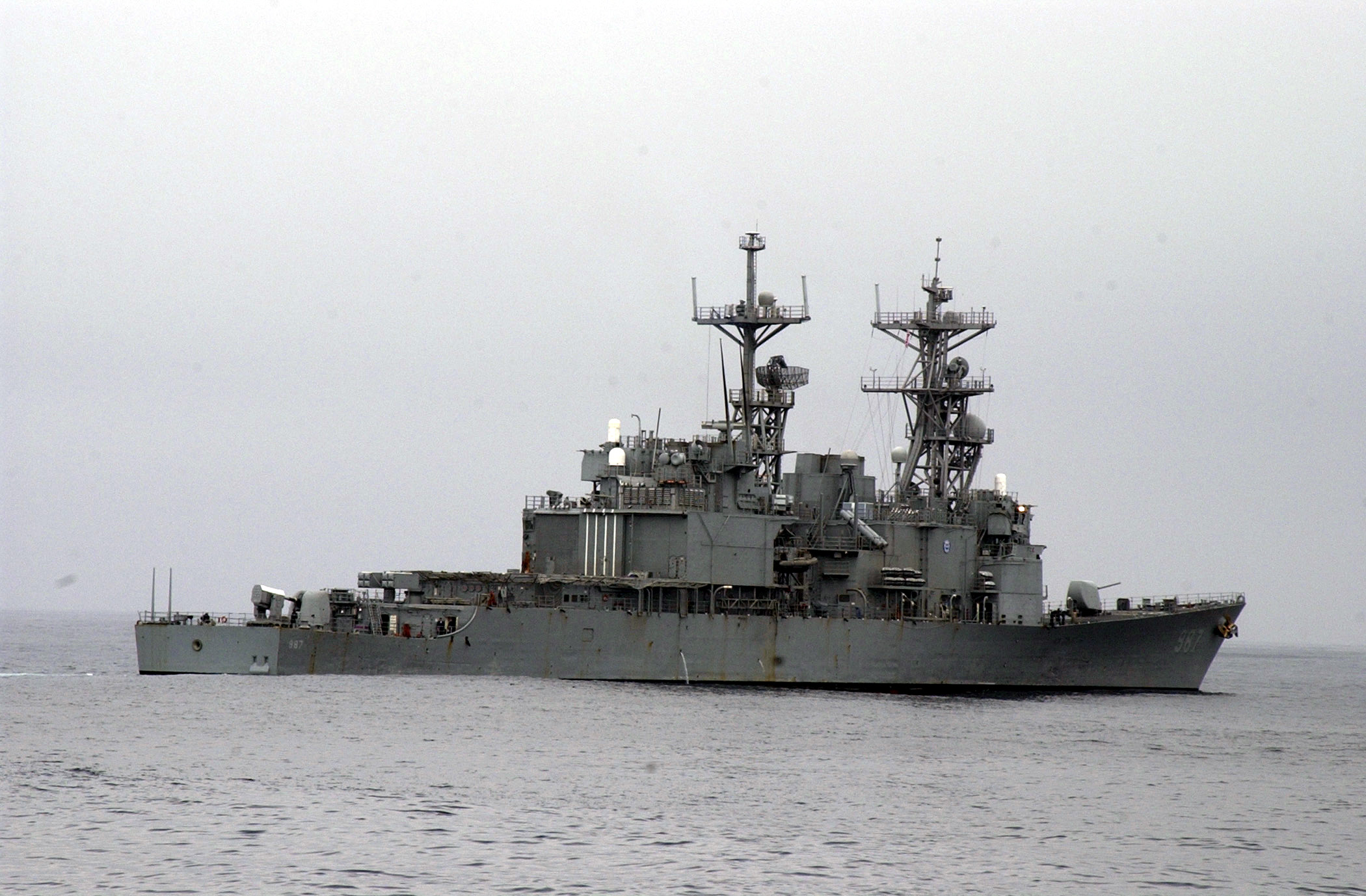
USS O'Bannon on 25 June 2003
