= Japan National Route 177 =

Road in Kyoto Prefecture, Japan

National Route 177
- 国道177号
- 国道177号
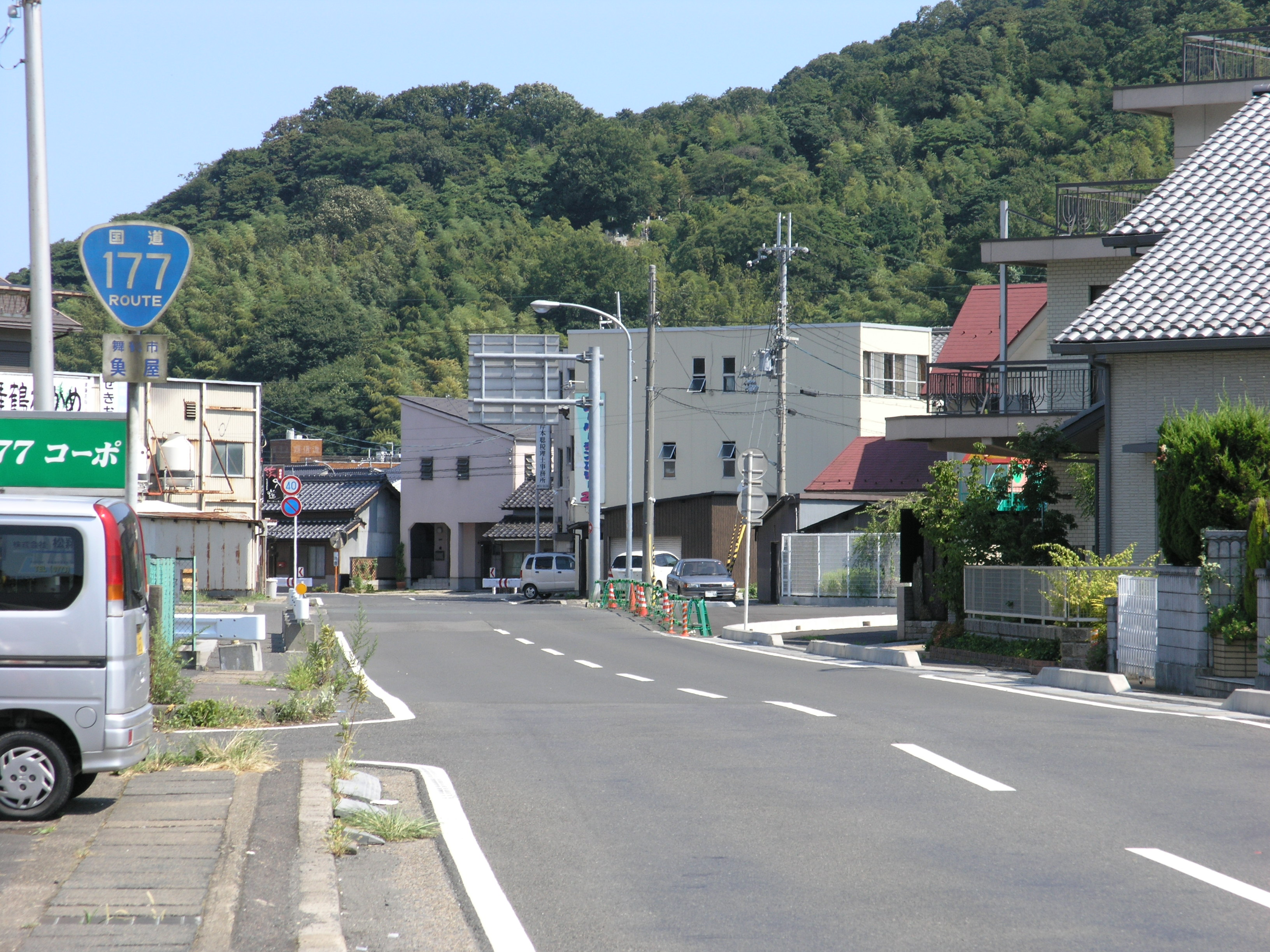

Route information
- Length: 0.7 km (0.43 mi; 2,300 ft)

Major junctions
- North end: Kyoto Maizuru Port
- South end: National Route 27 / National Route 175 in Maizuru, Kyoto

Location
- Country: Japan

Highway system
- National highways of Japan; Expressways of Japan
← National Route 176	→ National Route 178

National Route 177 is a national highway in Japan connecting Kyoto Maizuru Port (Maizuru, Kyoto) and Maizuru, Kyoto. Its total length is 0.7 km (0.43 mi). It is one of the shortest national highways in Japan.
