= FV Commandant Bultinck =

History
- Name: (United Kingdom) Marloes (M76) (1911-1914); (United Kingdom) HMS Marloes (1914-1919); (United Kingdom) Marloes (FD170) (1919-1926); (Belgium) Commandant Bultinck (1927-1929)
- Owner: Société de Pêcheries à Vapeur
- Port of registry: Ostend, Belgium
- Builder: Smith's Dock Co. Ltd.
- Yard number: 466
- Launched: 3 March, 1911
- Completed: May, 1911
- Acquired: 1911
- Maiden voyage: 1911
- In service: 1911
- Out of service: 2 October 1929
- Identification: Official number: 128753
- Fate: Ran aground in a storm and scrapped

General characteristics
- Type: Trawler
- Tonnage: 219 GRT
- Length: 35.7 m (117 ft 2 in)
- Beam: 6.4 m (21 ft 0 in)
- Depth: 3.4 m (11 ft 2 in)
- Installed power: 1 x 3 cyl. triple expansion engine
- Propulsion: Screw propeller
- Crew: 12

FV Commandant Bultinck was a Belgian trawler that ran aground in a storm off Fleetwood, Lancashire, United Kingdom on 2 October 1929.

== Construction ==
Marloes was built at the Smith's Dock Co. Ltd. shipyard in Middlesbrough, United Kingdom in 1911. Where she was launched and completed that same year. The ship was 35.7 metres (117 ft 2 in) long, had a beam of 6.4 metres (21 ft 0 in) and had a depth of 3.4 metres (11 ft 2 in). She was assessed at 219 GRT and had one three-cylinder triple expansion engine driving a single screw propeller.

== Early service ==
Registered at Milford, England 26 May, 1911. and put in service

== World War I ==
Requisitioned by the Admiralty in August 1914 and used as a minesweeper. Sold 1918 and returned to owner 1919.

== Post war service ==
Milford registry closed 20 May, 1919 and registered at Fleetwood next day. Sold in 1924. Sold to Belgian firm August 1926 and renamed Commandant Bultinck.

== Sinking ==
Commandant Bultinck was sailing in the Irish Sea when on 2 October 1929, she got caught in a storm with winds up to 80 mph (130 km/h) with sleet and lightning, which drove her to shore and ran her aground at Rossall Point near Fleetwood, Lancashire, United Kingdom barely missing a breakwater. She was spotted on the beach by a number of passengers on a tramcar at 11 pm, who quickly alerted the Fleetwood harbourmaster. The lifeboat headquarters at Blackpool were also informed of the wreck and chartered their lifeboat by horse to the wrecksite.

By the time the rescuers arrived, a large crowd had followed them to the site, where the harbourmaster said that the lifeboat would be useless as the wreck lay in very shallow waters surrounded by big waves. The rescuers waited on the shore until 4 am as they saw how another lifeboat with other rescuers tried in vain to reach the wreck before having to return to Fleetwood for shelter against the storm. Meanwhile, Commandant Bultinck endured wave after wave crashing over her deck as she lay broadside to the shore, with her crew holding onto the tilted deck. Ultimately three of the crew attempted to swim for the shore and holding onto a rope which could be used afterwards to rescue the remaining crewmen, but were swept under the stranded vessel and drowned.

By this time one of the teachers from the nearby Rossall School arrived on the scene with a megaphone. He was the only person who knew some Flemish and helped to communicate with the stricken Flemish crew who did not know any English. The crew of Commandant Bultinck were reluctant to enter the water again as the two previous attempts failed and claimed the lives of three of their fellow crewmen. Instead they waited until low tide when the rescuers were finally able to reach the ship and assist the remaining crew into getting ashore. The nine surviving crewmen were taking to the Royal National Mission to Deep Sea Fishermen's Hostel in Fleetwood. The fish catch aboard Commandant Bultinck was also lost as all the ice aboard for preservation had been washed out by the seawater.

== Wreck ==
The wreck of Commandant Bultinck lay nearly completely dry at low tide, but several attempts to refloat her were made. But even after holes were cut in the ship to make her lighter, she still failed to be refloated. Ultimately Commandant Bultinck was scrapped on site.
