= I-180 =

I-180 may refer to:

- Interstate 180, one of several roads:
  - Interstate 180 (California), a temporary designation used in 1978 for the Richmond–San Rafael Bridge in the San Francisco Bay Area in California that is now part of Interstate 580
  - Interstate 180 (Illinois), a short spur in rural Putnam and Bureau counties in northern Illinois
  - Interstate 180 (Nebraska), a spur in Lincoln, Nebraska
  - Interstate 180 (Pennsylvania), a spur to Williamsport, Pennsylvania
  - Interstate 180 (Wyoming), a short, non-freeway spur in Cheyenne, Wyoming
- Polikarpov I-180
- Japanese submarine I-180
