= USS Kingsbury =

1944 Haskell-class attack transport

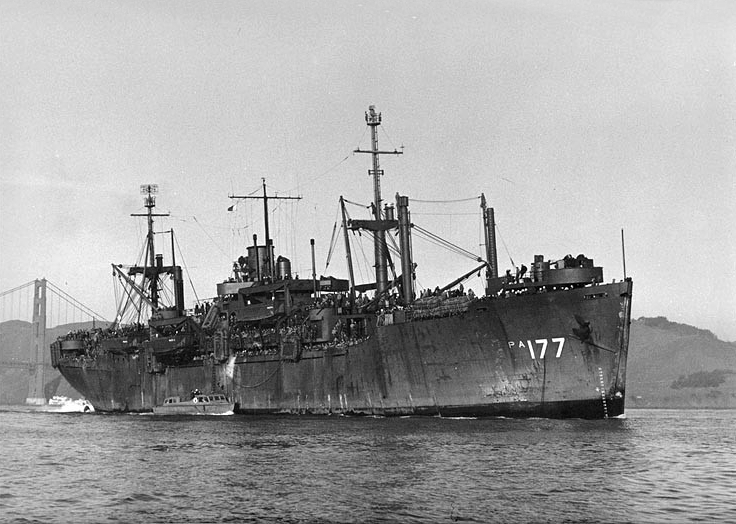
- Kingsbury in San Francisco Bay, late 1945 or early 1946

History

United States
- Name: USS Kingsbury
- Namesake: Kingsbury County, South Dakota
- Ordered: as type VC2-S-AP5
- Launched: 16 November 1944
- Commissioned: 6 December 1944
- Decommissioned: 19 April 1946
- Stricken: 1 May 1946
- Fate: Scrapped, 1983

General characteristics
- Displacement: 12,450 tons (full load)
- Length: 455 ft 0 in (138.68 m)
- Beam: 62 ft 0 in (18.90 m)
- Draught: 24 ft 0 in (7.32 m)
- Speed: 19 knots
- Capacity: 150,000 cu. ft, 2,900 tons
- Complement: 56 Officers 480 Enlisted
- Armament: one 5 in (130 mm) gun mount, twelve 40 mm gun mounts, ten 20 mm gun mounts

USS Kingsbury (APA/LPA-177) was a Haskell-class attack transport in service with the United States Navy from 1944 to 1946. She was scrapped in 1983.

== History ==
Kingsbury was launched 16 November 1944 by Oregon Shipbuilding Corp., Portland, Oregon, under a United States Maritime Commission contract; sponsored by Mrs. Leonard Buckler; and commissioned 6 December 1944.

=== World War II ===
After shakedown along the California coast, Kingsbury departed San Pedro, Los Angeles, 9 February 1945. Steaming via Pearl Harbor and Eniwetok, she arrived Iwo Jima 14 March, embarked battle-weary U.S. Marines, and returned to Pearl Harbor 5 April via Guam and Eniwetok. Sailing for Seattle, Washington, 22 May, she arrived 29 May and embarked 1,507 soldiers before departing 15 June for Iwo Jima. Arriving 7 July, she debarked her passengers and then departed 10 July with 262 military passengers for Pearl Harbor where she arrived the 21st.

Supporting U.S. occupation operations in Japan, Kingsbury cleared Pearl Harbor 1 September and steamed via Saipan for Sasebo, Japan, where she arrived 22 September to debark occupation troops of the 5th Marine Division. From 25 September to 14 October she made a circular run between Japan and the Philippines to transport additional occupation troops: then she returned to the Philippines 26 October for Operation Magic Carpet duty. With 2,077 homebound troops embarked, she departed Tacloban, Leyte, 30 October and reached San Francisco 17 November. Between 2 December and 9 January 1946 Kingsbury made another trip to and from the Far East, carrying 935 replacement troops to Manila and returned 2,058 veterans to the U.S. West Coast.

=== Decommissioning and fate ===
Kingsbury sailed 11 February for the U.S. East Coast, arriving Norfolk, Virginia, 3 March. She decommissioned at Portsmouth, Virginia, 19 April. Turned over to custody of the United States Maritime Commission 23 April, her name was struck from the Naval Register 1 May and placed in the Maritime Defense Reserve Fleet, James River, Virginia. She was scrapped in 1983.

== Awards ==
Kingsbury received one battle star for World War II service.
