= NA-177 =

NA-177 may refer to:

- NA-177 (Muzaffargarh-II), a former constituency of the National Assembly of Pakistan
- NA-177 (Rahim Yar Khan-III), a constituency of the National Assembly of Pakistan
