= USS LST-177 =

LST-1-class landing ship tank

History

United States
- Name: LST-177
- Builder: Missouri Valley Bridge & Iron Co., Evansville
- Laid down: 5 February 1943
- Launched: 16 May 1943
- Sponsored by: Mrs. James Gibson
- Commissioned: 22 June 1943
- Decommissioned: 17 February 1946
- Stricken: 12 April 1946
- Identification: Callsign: NZNC
- Honors and awards: See Awards
- Fate: Transferred to France, 13 March 1947

History

France
- Name: Laita
- Namesake: Laita
- Commissioned: 13 March 1947
- Decommissioned: January 1962
- Reclassified: L9001
- Identification: Pennant number: K05
- Fate: Scrapped, December 1977

General characteristics
- Class & type: LST-1-class tank landing ship
- Displacement: 4,080 long tons (4,145 t) full load; 2,160 long tons (2,190 t) landing
- Length: 328 ft (100 m) oa
- Beam: 50 ft (15 m)
- Draft: Full load: 8 ft 2 in (2.49 m) forward; 14 ft 1 in (4.29 m) aft; Landing at 2,160 t: 3 ft 11 in (1.19 m) forward; 9 ft 10 in (3.00 m) aft
- Installed power: 2 × 900 hp (670 kW) Electro-Motive Diesel 12-567A diesel engines; 1,700 shp (1,300 kW)
- Propulsion: 1 × Falk main reduction gears; 2 × Propellers
- Speed: 12 kn (22 km/h; 14 mph)
- Range: 24,000 nmi (44,000 km; 28,000 mi) at 9 kn (17 km/h; 10 mph) while displacing 3,960 long tons (4,024 t)
- Boats & landing craft carried: 2 or 6 x LCVPs
- Capacity: 2,100 tons oceangoing maximum; 350 tons main deckload
- Troops: 16 officers, 147 enlisted men
- Complement: 13 officers, 104 enlisted men
- Armament: Varied, ultimate armament; 2 × twin 40 mm (1.57 in) Bofors guns; 4 × single 40 mm Bofors guns; 12 × 20 mm (0.79 in) Oerlikon cannons

USS LST-177 was a LST-1-class tank landing ship in the United States Navy during World War II. She was later sold to France as Laita (K05).

== Construction and career ==
LST-177 was laid down on 5 February 1943 at Missouri Valley Bridge & Iron Co., Evansville, Indiana. Launched on 16 May 1943 and commissioned on 22 June 1943.

=== Service in the United States ===
During World War II, LST-177 was assigned to the Europe-Africa-Middle East theater. She took part in the Convoy UGS-36 on 1 April 1944 and Operation Dragoon from 15 August to 25 September 1944.

LST-277 was decommissioned on 17 February 1946.

She was struck from the Navy Register on 12 April 1946.

=== Service in France ===
She was transferred to the French Navy and commissioned on 13 March 1947 with the name Laita (K05). The ship was reclassified L9001 later in her career.

Laita took part in the Algerian War between 1 November 1954 to 19 March 1962 and the First Indochina War between 19 December 1946 to 1 August 1954.

During the 10th Anniversary of the Landing in Provence, Southern France, she was present in the event.

The ship took part in the Marseille-Bizerte crossing from 7 January to 9 January 1958 but was caught in a storm which forced the captain to take shelter between Corsica and Sardinia. Sick people were present in the ship's holding compartment and was packed with people. In sight of Bizerte, the ship disembarked at night.

The ship was out of service in January 1962 and sold for scrap later in December 1977.

== Awards ==
LST-177 have earned the following awards:

- American Campaign Medal
- Europe-Africa-Middle East Campaign Medal (52 battle stars)
- World War II Victory Medal

== Sources ==
- U.S. Dept. of the Treasury (1962). Treasury Decisions Under the Customs, Internal Revenue, Industrial Alcohol, Narcotic and Other Laws, Volume 97. U.S. Government Printing Office.
- Moore, Capt. John (1984). Jane's Fighting Ships 1984-85. Jane's Information Group. ISBN 978-0710607959.
- Saunders, Stephen (2009). Jane's Fighting Ships 2009-2010. Jane's Information Group. ISBN 978-0710628886.
- Fairplay International Shipping Journal Volume 222. United Kingdom: Fairplay Publishing Limited. 1967.
