= A177 =

A177 may refer to:

- A177 road (England), a road connecting Stockton and Durham
- A177 road (Malaysia), a road in Perak connecting Kampung Acheh and Sitiawan
