= 177th meridian =

177th meridian may refer to:

- 177th meridian east, a line of longitude east of the Greenwich Meridian
- 177th meridian west, a line of longitude west of the Greenwich Meridian

177th meridian west	177th meridian east
