= Wisconsin Highway 176 =

Former highway in Wisconsin

State Trunk Highway 176

Route information
- Maintained by WisDOT
- Length: 12.7 mi (20.4 km)
- Existed: 1947–1999

Location
- Country: United States
- State: Wisconsin
- Counties: Lafayette

Highway system
- Wisconsin State Trunk Highway System; Interstate; US; State; Scenic; Rustic
← WIS 175	→ WIS 177

State Trunk Highway 176 (often called Highway 176, STH-176 or WIS 176) was a state highway in the U.S. state of Wisconsin. It ran east–west between the Illinois border southeast of South Wayne and Wiota. Control over the road was given to Lafayette County in 1999; it is now designated as County Highway D.

== Route description ==
WIS 176 began north from the Illinois state line. It then turns west and then north to South Wayne. In South Wayne, it meets WIS 11. Continuing north, it crosses the Pecatonica River and then turns northwest before ending at WIS 78.

== History ==
Initially, WIS 176 used to be part of CTH-D. During its existence, there was no significant changes to the routing. In 1999, it was decommissioned and then reverted to its former CTH counterpart.

== Major intersections ==
The entire route was in Lafayette County.

Location	mi	km	Destinations	Notes
Town of Wayne	0.0	0.0	State Line Road	Route began at state line
South Wayne	6.1	9.8	WIS 11 west	South end of WIS 11 overlap
South Wayne	6.2	10.0	WIS 11 east	North end of WIS 11 overlap
Town of Wiota	12.7	20.4	WIS 78	
1.000 mi = 1.609 km; 1.000 km = 0.621 mi: Concurrency terminus
