= Japan National Route 178 =

National highway in Japan

National Route 178
- 国道178号
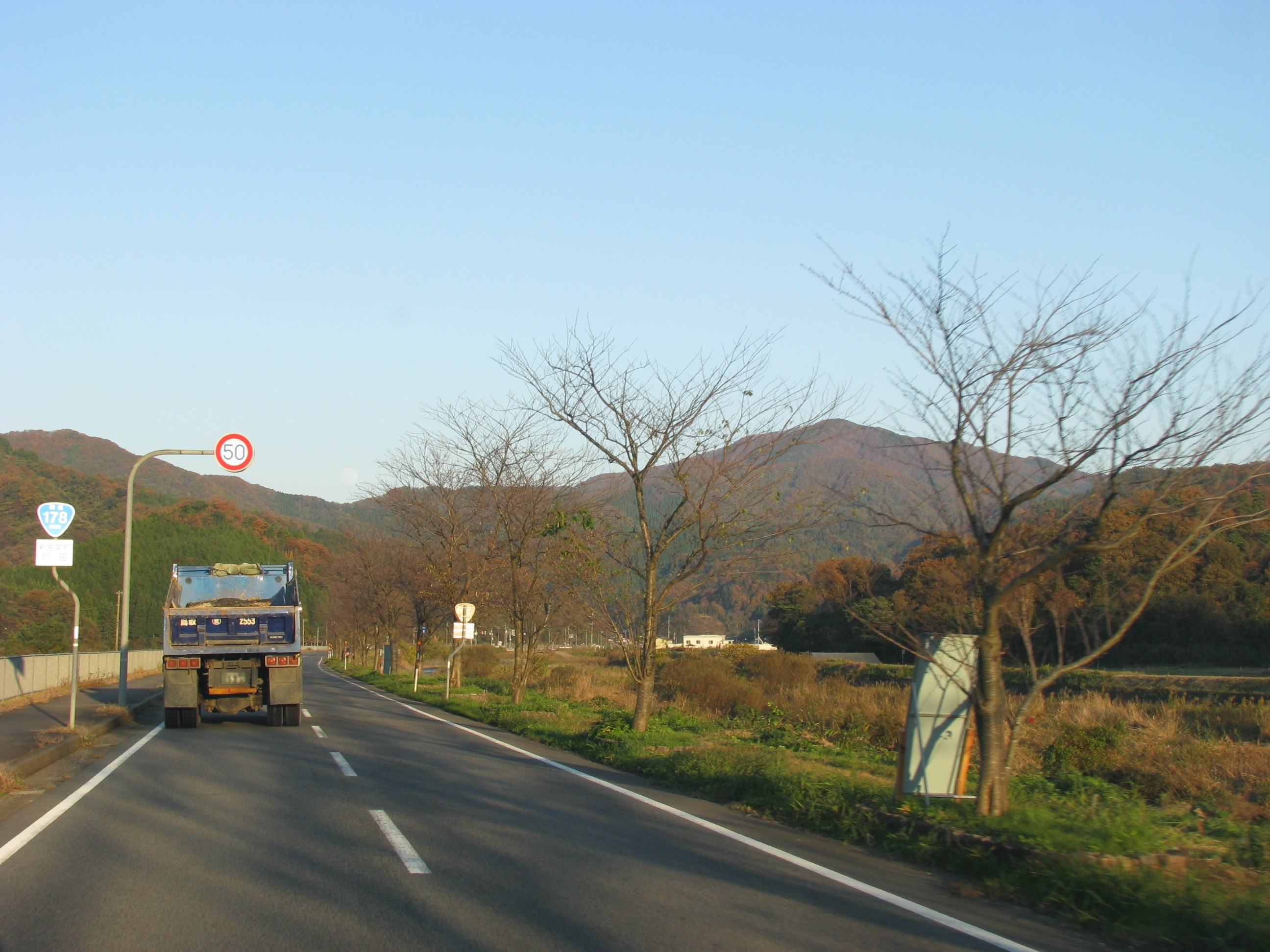

Route information
- Length: 201 km (125 mi)

Major junctions
- West end: Prefectural Road 328 in Iwami, Tottori
- East end: National Route 175 in Maizuru, Kyoto

Location
- Country: Japan

Highway system
- National highways of Japan; Expressways of Japan
← National Route 177	→ National Route 179

National Route 178 is a national highway of Japan connecting Maizuru, Kyoto and Iwami, Tottori in Japan, with a total length of 201 km (124.9 mi).
