= Interstate 175 (disambiguation) =

Interstate 175 can mean:

- Interstate 175 in Florida (the only current highway with that name)
- Interstate 175 (Georgia), the proposed highway in Georgia
- Interstate 175 (Kentucky–Tennessee), a defunct highway in Kentucky and Tennessee
