= I-177 =

I-177 may refer to:

- Interstate 177, a decommissioned interstate highway in Ohio, United States
- Japanese submarine I-177, a submarine of the Japanese Imperial Navy
