= USS Davenport =

Tacoma-class patrol frigate

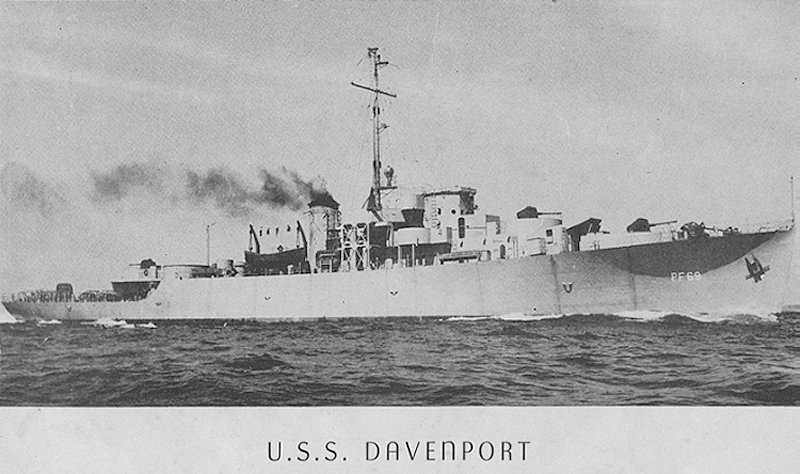
- USS Davenport (PF 69), commissioning program photo.

History

United States
- Name: Davenport
- Namesake: City of Davenport, Iowa
- Builder: Leathem D. Smith Shipbuilding Company, Sturgeon Bay, Wisconsin
- Launched: 8 December 1943
- Commissioned: 15 February 1945
- Decommissioned: 4 February 1946
- Fate: Sold for scrap, 6 June 1946

General characteristics
- Class & type: Tacoma-class frigate
- Displacement: 1,264 long tons (1,284 t)
- Length: 303 ft 11 in (92.63 m)
- Beam: 37 ft 6 in (11.43 m)
- Draft: 13 ft 8 in (4.17 m)
- Propulsion: 2 × 5,500 shp (4,101 kW) turbines; 3 boilers; 2 shafts
- Speed: 20 knots (37 km/h; 23 mph)
- Complement: 215
- Armament: 3 × 3"/50 dual purpose guns (3x1); 4 x 40 mm guns (2×2); 9 × 20 mm guns (9×1); 1 × Hedgehog anti-submarine mortar; 8 × Y-gun depth charge projectors; 2 × Depth charge tracks

USS Davenport (PF-69), a Tacoma-class frigate, was the only ship of the United States Navy to be named for Davenport, Iowa.

== Construction ==
Davenport (PF-69), originally classified as PG-177, was launched on 8 December 1943, by Leathem D. Smith Shipbuilding Company of Sturgeon Bay, Wisconsin, under a Maritime Commission contract, sponsored by Mrs. E. Frick; transferred to the Navy on 1 June 1944, and placed in service the same day; placed out of service for additional work a week later; and commissioned in full on 15 February 1945, with a crew of 215 USCG officers and enlisted men.

== Service history ==
Departing Norfolk, Virginia, on 17 April 1945, Davenport joined Pert (PG-95) and Action (PG-86) for an anti-submarine patrol off Casco Bay. She returned to New York on 24 April, and three days later got underway to escort a convoy to Mers El Kébir, Algeria, returning to Norfolk on 7 June. Two days later she entered the Navy Yard at Charleston, South Carolina, for conversion to a weather ship. This involved removing the number three 3-inch (76 mm) gun and installing in its place a hangar used to house meteorological equipment and to inflate and launch weather balloons.

Davenport stood out from Charleston on 26 June 1945, and on 1 July took station off NS Argentia, Newfoundland to report meteorological data. She remained on this duty until 21 October aside from the period 6 August to 21 during which she towed SC-705 to Reykjavík, Iceland. Arriving at Boston Navy Yard 25 October, Davenport remained there until decommissioned on 4 February 1946. She was sold 6 June 1946.
