= Wisconsin Highway 177 =

Former state highway in Wisconsin, United States

State Trunk Highway 177

Route information
- Maintained by WisDOT
- Length: 2.6 mi (4.2 km)
- Existed: 1951–c. 1985

Major junctions
- West end: WIS 42 / CTH-V east of Mishicot
- East end: Point Beach State Forest

Location
- Country: United States
- State: Wisconsin
- Counties: Manitowoc

Highway system
- Wisconsin State Trunk Highway System; Interstate; US; State; Scenic; Rustic
← WIS 176	→ WIS 178

Wisconsin Highway 177 (WIS 177) was a state highway in Wisconsin, United States. It traveled from WIS 42 to Point Beach State Forest.

== Route description ==
Starting at its western terminus, WIS 177 traveled eastward from WIS 42. It then curved southeast and then back east again. Continuing east, it abruptly ended next to Lake Michigan.

== History ==
In 1951, WIS 177 was formed. The route resembled a spur of WIS 42. It traveled from WIS 42 to the Point Beach State Forest. During its existence, no significant changes were made. Around 1985, CTH-V extended east towards the state forest, superseding the whole of WIS 177. The change remains like this to this day.

== Major intersections ==
The entire highway was in Manitowoc County.

Location	mi	km	Destinations	Notes
Two Creeks–Two Rivers town line	0.0	0.0	WIS 42	Western terminus of WIS 177
Town of Two Rivers	2.6	4.2	Point Beach State Forest	Eastern terminus of WIS 177
1.000 mi = 1.609 km; 1.000 km = 0.621 mi
