= Japan National Route 175 =

Road in Japan

National Route 175
- 国道175号
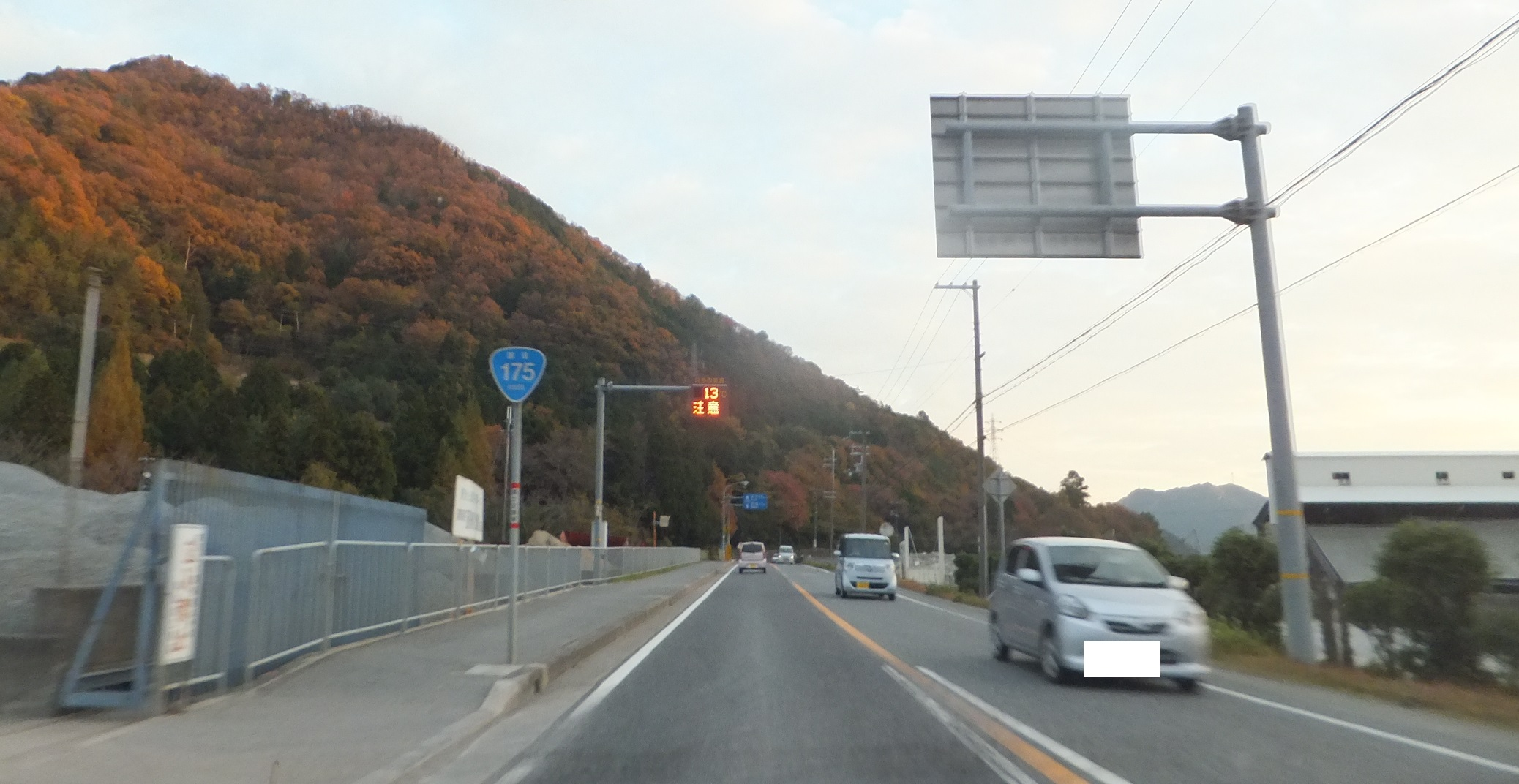

Route information
- Length: 126.4 km (78.5 mi)
- Existed: 18 May 1953–present

Major junctions
- North end: National Route 27 / National Route 177 in Maizuru, Kyoto
- South end: National Route 2 / National Route 427 in Akashi, Hyōgo

Location
- Country: Japan

Highway system
- National highways of Japan; Expressways of Japan
← National Route 174	→ National Route 176

National Route 175 is a national highway of Japan connecting Akashi, Hyōgo and Maizuru, Kyoto in Japan, with a total length of 126.4 km (78.5 mi).
