= Muhō Noelke =

German-born Zen monk (born 1968)

Muhō Nölke (ネルケ無方)
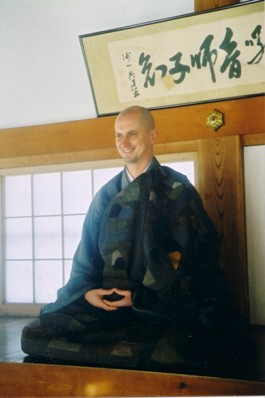
- Title: Priest

Personal life
- Born: March 1, 1968 (age 58) Berlin, West Germany

Religious life
- Religion: Zen Buddhism
- School: Sōtō

Senior posting
- Teacher: Miyaura Shinyu

Muhō Nölke (ネルケ無方) (born March 1, 1968, as Jens Olaf Christian Nölke) is a German-born Zen monk who was the abbot of Antai-ji, a Japanese Sōtō Zen temple in Shin'onsen in the Mikata District of Japan's Hyōgo Prefecture from 2002 until 2020. He has translated works of Dōgen and Kōdō Sawaki, and has authored six books in German and sixteen books in Japanese.

== Biography ==
At age 16, Muhō was introduced to zazen by one of his high school teachers and soon had the wish to become a Zen monk. To prepare for his stay in Japan, he studied Japanese at the Free University of Berlin, along with philosophy and physics. During his studies, he spent one year at Kyoto University and learned for the first time about Antai-ji. At age 22, he spent six months there as a lay practitioner.

Three years later, after graduating from university, Muhō was ordained as a Sōtō Zen monk under the abbot Miyaura Shinyu Rōshi. Apart from Antai-ji, he has trained for one year at the Rinzai monastery Tōfuku-ji in Kyoto, and one year at Hosshin-ji in Obama, Fukui.

After obtaining the transmission of dharma (shihō) from his teacher Miyaura Rōshi, Muhō decided to live as a homeless monk in a park in central Osaka, where he led a zazen group in 2001. Six months later, in February 2002, he learned of the sudden death of his teacher and was called back to Antai-ji. He succeeded his teacher as the ninth abbot in the spring of that year. In 2020 he retired after 18 years as the abbot and appointed Ekō, a Japanese nun, as his successor. Since he retired as abbot, Muho spends most of his time in Osaka, where he leads a Zen group that meets every Sunday in Osaka castle park (except when it is raining).

Muhō has published numerous books and translations in both Japanese and German. He has also featured in several films, including documentaries by director Takeshi Kitano and broadcaster Peter Barakan's "Begin Japanology", as well as Werner Penzel's feature film "Zen for Nothing".

== Bibliography ==
=== English ===
- Zazen, and the Path to Happiness. English edition translated by Iwona Luszowicz, House of Vendetta, 2025, ISBN 979-8-232-34531-0.

=== German ===
- Zazen oder der Weg zum Glück. Rowohlt, 2007, ISBN 3-499-62203-3.
- Ein Regentropfen kehrt ins Meer zurück. Berlin-Verlag, 2016, ISBN 978-3827013385.
- Das Meer weist keinen Fluss zurück. Berlin-Verlag, 2018, ISBN 978-3827013804.
- Der Mond leuchtet in jeder Pfütze. Berlin-Verlag, 2020, ISBN 978-3827013927.
- Alles, was du denkst, sind nur Gedanken. O. W. Barth Verlag, 2025, ISBN 978-3426561751.
- Beiß mich! Sechs Schlüsseltexte des Zen zum Lesen, Kauen und Verdauen. BoD, 2026, ISBN 978-3819206009.
- Futter für Pferd und Esel: Einführung in Dôgens Zen. BoD, 2026, ISBN 978-3696391997.

=== Japanese ===
- Mayoeru mono no Zen shugyou. Shincho-shinsho, 2011, ISBN 4-10-610404-0.
- Hadaka no Bousama. Sanga, 2012, ISBN 4-905425-12-3.
- Tada suwaru. Kobunsha-shinsho, 2012, ISBN 9784334036928.
- Ikiru hint 33. Asahi-shinsho, 2012, ISBN 9784022730992.
- Otona ni naru tame no yatsu no shugyou. Shodensha, 2013, ISBN 4396113153
- Mayoinagara ikiru. Daiwa-shobo, 2013, ISBN 9784479012108
- Dogen wo gyakuyunyu. Sanga, 2013, ISBN 978-4905425472
- Nihonjin ni shukyo ha iranai. Best-shinsho, 2014, ISBN 978-4584124321
- Yomu dake Zen shugyou. Asahi-shinbun-shuppan, 2014, ISBN 978-4-02-331321-7
- Mayoi ha satori no dai-ippo. Shincho-shinsho, 2015, ISBN 978-4-10-610603-3
- Ari no mama demo ii, ari no mama de nakute mo ii. Best-shinsho, 2015, ISBN 978-4584136317
- Kokoro ni hibiku Bukkyou no kingen 100. Takarajima-sha, 2015, ISBN 978-4800240248
- Naze nihonjin ha gosenzo-sama ni inoru no ka. Gentousha-shinsho, 2015, ISBN 978-4344983816
- Bukkyou no tsumetasa, Kirisutokyou no ayausa. Best-shinsho, 2016, ISBN 978-4584125090
- Magenai Doitsujin, kimenai Nihonjin. Sanga, 2016, ISBN 978-4865640557
- Kyou wo shinu koto de, ashita wo ikiru. Best-shinsho, 2017, ISBN 978-4584125489
- Jinsei to iu kusogame wo kaeru tame no bukkyou. Shinju-sha, 2025, ISBN 978-4-393-13472-6
- Jinsei to iu kusogame wo kaeru tame no tetsugaku to zazen. Shinju-sha, 2025, ISBN 978-4-393-13471-9

=== Translations in English ===
- Kōdō Sawaki: To You: Collected Sayings of Kodo Sawaki (co-translated by Jesse Reiho Haasch). Hohm Press 2021. ISBN 978-1942493709

=== Translations in German ===
- Kōdō Sawaki: Tag für Tag ein guter Tag. Angkor 2008. ISBN 978-3-936018-57-8
- Kōdō Sawaki: Es geht nicht um dich. BoD 2026. ISBN 978-3-696392-24-6
- Kōdō Sawaki: Zen ist die größte Lüge aller Zeiten. BoD 2026. ISBN 978-3-696358-01-3
- Kōshō Uchiyama: Die Zen-Lehre des Landstreichers Kodo. Angkor 2007, übersetzt gemeinsam mit Guido Keller ISBN 978-3-936018-51-6
- Hitoshi Nagai: Penetre & ich: Philosophie für ein glückliches Leben. Berlin-Verlag 2021 ISBN 978-3-827014-35-1
