= Japanology Plus =

Japanese television programs

- Genre: Interview
- Presented by: Peter Barakan
- Country of origin: Japan

Original release
- Network: NHK World-Japan
- Release: 2000

Weekend Japanology, Begin Japanology, and Japanology Plus are Japanese television programs aired on NHK World, and presented by Peter Barakan. The programs explore aspects of traditional and contemporary Japan and interview experts in various fields.

The series premiered under the title Weekend Japanology, which was first broadcast in 2002 in Japan and beginning in other countries on April 6, 2003. Weekend Japanology is mostly talk-show style, typically hosted by Peter Barakan and Mami Kikuchi. It eventually developed into Begin Japanology (first broadcast on October 5, 2007 in Japan and in other countries on March 14, 2008) Japanology Plus (first broadcast April 3, 2014)) is the most recent show. Other than the title, little has changed in the content or format. For many years, Japanology Plus has two presenters: Peter Barakan, who guides the viewer through the show, and Matt Alt, who presented the section "Plus One" with useful tips. Alt has since left the show and has been replaced with Kyle Card. The show also has an occasional talk series called "Japanophiles" featuring interviews with foreigners doing activities in Japan. Both Japanology Plus and Begin Japanology are typically 28 minutes in duration.

The Japanology series also has two additional shows, "Begin Japanology Mini" and "Japanology Plus Mini." Both consist of five-minute episodes covering the same topics as their respective 28-minute counterparts.

== List of Weekend Japanology episodes ==
=== Season 1 ===
April 2003 - October 2004
#	Name	Air date
1	Cherry Blossoms	April 6, 2003
2	Sumo	April 13, 2003
3	Japanese emotional expression	April 20, 2003
4	The power of design	April 27, 2003
5	Japanese Food: Nattō	May 4, 2003
6	Robot design	May 11, 2003
7	Comedy	May 18, 2003
8	Diet for a long life	May 25, 2003
9	Contemporary dance	June 1, 2003
10	Kimono	June 8, 2003
11	"Koto" and its charm	June 15, 2003
12	Traditional Japanese Houses	June 22, 2003
13	Fireworks	July 13, 2003
14	Japanese Paper	July 20, 2003
15	"Yacht Race Around the World"	July 27, 2003
16	Memories of the Atomic Bomb	August 3, 2003
17	Wedding	August 18, 2003
18	Summer Feature Special! Out and About	August 24, 2003
19	Let's Drink Japanese Tea!	September 7, 2003
20	Forefront of Universal Design	September 14, 2003
21	Inheritance: Japanese Songs	September 21, 2003
22	Changing Japanese Women	September 28, 2003
23	Exploring Tokyo with a Special Guide	October 6, 2003
24	Japan in Contemporary Art	October 12, 2003
25	Haiku	October 19, 2003
26	Invitation to Noh	October 26, 2003
27	Calligraphy: A Soul That Interacts with Words	November 2, 2003
28	Seasonal Food	November 9, 2003
28	Challenging the World with Entertainment Movies	November 16, 2003
30	Folk Songs Seen by a Jazzman	November 23, 2003
31	Japanese Car Design	November 30, 2003
32	Japanese People and Earthquakes	December 7, 2003
33	Loss of Japan - Nippon Deciphered from Pop Culture	December 14, 2003
34	The Ancient City	January 11, 2004
35	Zen	January 18, 2004
36	Shinkansen	January 25, 2004
37	Makeup: Japan	February 1, 2004
38	Japanese Animation	February 8, 2004
39	Classical Japanese Music	February 15, 2004
40	Yakimono	February 22, 2004
41	Pearls	February 29, 2004
42	Will Keitai Brighten the Future?	March 7, 2004
43	The World of Japanese Painting Drawn by Senju	March 14, 2004
44	Out & About—Best Of Selection (Part 1)	March 21, 2004
45	Out & About—Best Of Selection (Part 2)	March 28, 2004
46	Shakuhachi	April 4, 2004
47	Contemporary Architecture	April 11, 2004
48	Welcome to the World of Manga	April 18, 2004
49	Japanese Pop Music	April 26, 2004
50	Japanese Dogs	May 2, 2004
51	Sushi Culture Magazine	May 9, 2004
52	Rakugo	May 17, 2004
53	Sounds of Japan	May 23, 2004
54	Airplanes	May 31, 2004
55	Learning from Edo: Recycling	June 6, 2004
56	Japanese Garden	June 13, 2004
57	Japanese Confectionery	June 27, 2004
58	Shugendo and Faith	July 4, 2004
59	Japanese Ships	July 11, 2004
60	Fashion	July 18, 2004
61	The Japanese Face	July 25, 2004
62	Kagura	August 1, 2004
63	Vending Machines	August 8, 2004
64	Japanese Tableware	September 5, 2004
65	80 Years of Life	September 12, 2004
66	Japanese Jazz	September 19, 2004
67	Tokyo Tourism - Yanaka Neighborhood	October 3, 2004
68	Bushido	October 10, 2004
69	Changing Akihabara	October 17, 2004
70	Golf in Japan	October 24, 2004
71	Bonsai	October 31, 2004

=== Season 2 ===
May 2005 - January 2008
#	Name	Air date
1	Japanese Rock	May 7, 2005
2	Sho	May 21, 2005
3	Japanese and Mathematics	June 11, 2005
4	Ramen	June 25, 2005
5	Sentō	July 23, 2005
6	Origami	July 30, 2005
7	Exploring Nagoya	August 6, 2005
8	Robot	September 17, 2005
9	Edokomon	September 24, 2005
10	Young Entrepreneurs in Japan	October 8, 2005
11	J-Pop	October 15, 2005
12	Baby Boomers' Consumer Activities	October 29, 2005
13	Eco Cars	November 12, 2005
14	Japanese Lights	December 11, 2005
15	Japanese People and the Stars	November 26, 2005
16	Yokohama Triennale 2005	December 3, 2005
17	Mottainai!	December 17, 2005
18	Soba	December 24, 2005
19	Japanese People and Hot Springs	December 31, 2005
20	J League	January 7, 2006
21	Taiko - Japanese Drums	January 14, 2006
22	Washi: Wrapping Technique and Spirit	January 21, 2006
23	Japanese People and Monkeys	January 28, 2006
24	Small Houses	February 4, 2006
25	Soy Sauce	February 11, 2006
26	Ukiyo-e	February 18, 2006
27	Japanese People and Fish	February 25, 2006
28	Japan Fashion Week	March 4, 2006
29	Cool Japan: Japanese Pop Culture	March 11, 2006
30	Hay Fever	March 18, 2006
31	Out & About — Best Of Selection (Part 1)	March 25, 2006
32	Out & About — Best OF Selection (Part 2)	April 1, 2006
33	Sake	April 17, 2006
34	Japanese Language	April 24, 2006
35	Buyō	May 1, 2006
36	Kyoto Cityscape Preservation	May 15, 2006
37	Japanese Castles	May 22, 2006
38	Japanese Garden Plants	May 29, 2006
39	Mt. Fuji	June 5, 2006
40	The World of Tsuguharu Foujita	June 12, 2006
41	Buddha Statues	June 19, 2006
42	Ikebana	July 3, 2006
43	Japanese Travel Culture	July 10, 2006
44	Japan in Advertisements	July 17, 2006
45	Home Appliances	July 24, 2006
46	Tatami	July 31, 2006
47	Asakusa	August 21, 2006
48	Kamakura	August 27, 2006
49	Udon	August 28, 2006
50	Japanese Rivers	September 4, 2006
51	Zazen Breathing Method	September 11, 2006
52	Incense	Culture September 25, 2006
53	Science Education in Japan	October 2, 2006
54	Umeboshi	October 9, 2006
55	Jōmon people	October 16, 2006
56	Minakata Kumagusu	October 22, 2006
57	Koizumi Yakumo and Japanese Kokoro	October 23, 2006
58	Okami-san	October 30, 2006
59	Small Theater Plays	November 20, 2006
60	Tempura	November 27, 2006
61	Rice Cultivation	December 18, 2006
62	Itō Jakuchū and Edo Paintings	December 25, 2006
63	Kyōgen	January 8, 2007
64	Winter in Japan	January 15, 2007
65	Nishikigoi - Koi Carp	January 22, 2007
66	Convenience Stores	January 29, 2007
67	Nabemono	February 5, 2007
68	Snow in Japan	February 12, 2007
69	Fishing	February 19, 2007
70	Dashi	February 26, 2007
71	Manzai	March 5, 2007
72	Shamisen	March 12, 2007
73	Japanese Wine	March 19, 2007
74	Migratory Birds and Japan	March 26, 2007
75	Japanese Patterns	April 2, 2007
76	Island Country Japan	April 16, 2007
77	Laughter in Japan	April 30, 2007
78	Kendo	May 7, 2007
79	The Charm of Japanese Lacquerware	May 14, 2007
80	The Turning Point for Japanese-style Employment	May 21, 2007
81	Shōchū	May 28, 2007
82	Shōgi	June 4, 2007
83	Tanka	June 11, 2007
84	Forest Regeneration	June 18, 2007
85	Tofu	June 25, 2007
86	Osaka Traditional Performing Art: Bunraku	July 2, 2007
87	The Heart of Osaka/The Heart of Beauty	June 16, 2007
88	Shikoku Pilgrimage	July 23, 2007
89	High-tech Japanese Ancient Technology	August 27, 2007
90	Ekiben	September 3, 2007
91	Disaster Prevention: Wisdom to Live in an Earthquake-prone Country	September 10, 2007
92	Dolls	September 17, 2007
93	Kimono Beauty and Technique	September 24, 2007
94	Tokyo Station	October 1, 2007
95	Miso	October 20, 2007
96	Tarō Okamoto	October 27, 2007
97	Onomatopoeia: The Charm of Mimetic Words	November 3, 2007
98	Bamboo in Japan	November 10, 2007
99	Sukiya Architecture	November 17, 2007
100	Japanese Television Technology	November 24, 2007
101	Crows in Tokyo	December 1, 2007
102	Natsume Sōseki	December 8, 2007
103	Unagi	December 22, 2007
104	Isamu Noguchi and Japan	January 12, 2008
105	Enka	January 19, 2008

== List of Begin Japanology episodes ==
=== Season 1 ===
April 2008 - December 2008
#	Name	Air date
1	Bento	April 14, 2008
2	Miyazawa Kenji	April 21, 2008
3	Lacquerware	April 28, 2008
4	Rakugo	May 5, 2008
5	Tsukiji Market	May 12, 2008
6	Yoshoku	May 19, 2008
7	Kyudo	May 26, 2008
8	Tea Ceremony Architecture	June 2, 2008
9	Dagashi-ya	June 9, 2008
10	Nihon Buyo	June 16, 2008
11	Abacus	June 23, 2008
12	Ryukyu Kimono	June 30, 2008
13	Bamboo	July 14, 2008
14	Shirakawa-go	July 21, 2008
15	Fireworks	July 28, 2008
16	Hanging scrolls	August 17, 2008
17	The Tale of Genji: Part 1	August 24, 2008
18	The Tale of Genji: Part 2	August 31, 2008
19	Matcha	September 7, 2008
20	Tokyo Tower	September 14, 2008
21	Dashi	September 21, 2008
22	Oribe-yaki (pottery)	September 28, 2008
23	The Colorful World of Utagawa Hiroshige	October 5, 2008
24	The Seven Gods of Good Fortune	October 12, 2008
25	Sushi	October 19, 2008
26	Mikoshi (portable shrines)	October 26, 2008
27	Yuzen Kimono	November 2, 2008
28	Buddhist Statues	November 9, 2008
29	Hot springs	November 16, 2008
30	Fish	November 23, 2008
31	Tatami (straw mats)	December 1, 2008
32	Castles	December 8, 2008
33	Miso	December 15, 2008

=== Season 2 ===
January 2009 - December 2009
#	Name	Air Date
1	Nishijin-ori	January 19, 2009
2	Kyoto Lacquerware	January 26, 2009
3	Sake	February 2, 2009
4	Katsura Rikyu	February 9, 2009
5	Bonsai	February 16, 2009
6	The Four Seasons	February 23, 2009
7	Hina Dolls	March 2, 2009
8	Nagasaki	March 9, 2009
9	Five-Story Pagodas	March 16, 2009
10	Cherry blossoms	March 23, 2009
11	Chopsticks	April 3, 2009
12	Aizome	April 10, 2009
13	Bunraku	April 17, 2009
14	Kiriko Cut Glass	April 24, 2009
15	Traditional Folk Houses	May 8, 2009
16	Tea Ceremony	May 15, 2009
17	Soba	May 22, 2009
18	Origami	May 29, 2009
19	Imari Porcelain	June 5, 2009
20	Folding Fan	June 19, 2009
21	Kaiseki Cuisine	July 10, 2009
22	The Sounds of Japan	July 17, 2009
23	Masks	July 24, 2009
24	Satoyama	July 31, 2009
25	Kendo	August 29, 2009
26	The Fragrances of Japan	September 4, 2009
27	Spinning Tops	September 11, 2009
28	Rock and Stone	September 18, 2009
29	Ink Brushes	September 25, 2009
30	Tsukemono	October 2, 2009
31	Dogs	October 9, 2009
32	Ramen	October 16, 2009
33	Rice	October 23, 2009
34	Shinto Shrine	October 30, 2009
35	Festivals	November 6, 2009
36	Shinkansen	November 13, 2009
37	Gagaku	November 20, 2009
38	Marriage	November 27, 2009
39	Shogi	December 4, 2009
40	Nabe Cuisine	December 11, 2009
41	Sword	December 18, 2009

=== Season 3 ===
January 2010 - December 2010
#	Name	Air Date
1	Sentou	January 8, 2010
2	Karuta	January 15, 2010
3	Taiko	January 22, 2010
4	Cram School	January 29, 2010
5	Light	February 5, 2010
6	Footwear	February 12, 2010
7	Monkey	February 19, 2010
8	Soy Sauce	February 26, 2010
9	Tuna	March 5, 2010
10	Fusuma	March 12, 2010
11	Pearl	March 19, 2010
12	Todaiji	April 2, 2010
13	School Lunches	April 9, 2010
14	Geiko and Maiko	April 16, 2010
15	Robots	April 23, 2010
16	Wasabi	April 30, 2010
17	Women's Fashion Magazines	May 14, 2010
18	Izakaya	May 21, 2010
19	Apartments and Condominiums	May 28, 2010
20	Towns and Neighbourhoods	June 11, 2010
21	Tempura	June 18, 2010
22	Subways	June 25, 2010
23	Hairstyles	July 2, 2010
24	Home Appliances	July 9, 2010
25	Roof Tiles	July 16, 2010
26	Miniaturization	July 23, 2010
27	Silk	August 13, 2010
28	Soybeans	August 20, 2010
29	Curry	August 25, 2010
30	Dams	September 3, 2010
31	Hotels	September 10, 2010
32	Radio Calisthenics	September 17, 2010
33	Ekiben	September 24, 2010
34	Bridges	October 8, 2010
35	Earthquakes	October 15, 2010
36	Chrysanthemums	October 22, 2010
37	Cameras	November 4, 2010
38	Hiragana	November 11, 2010
39	Udon	November 18, 2010
40	Money	November 25, 2010
41	Nishikigoi	December 2, 2010
42	Volcanoes	December 9, 2010
43	Firefighting	December 16, 2010

=== Season 4 ===
January 2011 - December 2011
#	Name	Air Date
1	Mochi Rice Cake	January 13, 2011
2	Watches and Clocks	January 20, 2011
3	Fugu Blowfish	January 27, 2011
4	Haneda Airport	February 3, 2011
5	Kagura Dances	February 10, 2011
6	Snow	February 17, 2011
7	Pollen Allergy	March 3, 2011
8	Sashimono Woodwork	March 10, 2011
9	Cranes	April 7, 2011
10	Kitchen Knives	April 14, 2011
11	Fishing	April 21, 2011
12	Armour	April 28, 2011
13	Judo	May 5, 2011
14	The Life of Taro Okamoto	May 12, 2011
15	The Life of Osamu Dazai	May 19, 2011
16	The Life of Kenzo Tange	May 26, 2011
17	The Life of Hideko Maehata	June 2, 2011
18	Toilets	June 9, 2011
19	Lifts	June 16, 2011
20	Motorcycles	June 23, 2011
21	Unagi Eel	June 30, 2011
22	Japanophiles – Ilan Yanizky	July 7, 2011
23	Japanophiles – Silvain Guignard	July 14, 2011
24	Japanophiles – Stéphane Danton	July 21, 2011
25	Japanophiles – Dorothy Feibleman	July 28, 2011
26	Plastic Food Samples	August 18, 2011
27	Insects	August 25, 2011
28	Traditional Japanese Mathematics	September 1, 2011
29	Bicycles	September 8, 2011
30	Chusonji	September 15, 2011
31	Seaweed	September 29, 2011
32	Charcoal	October 6, 2011
33	Rain	October 13, 2011
34	Golf	October 20, 2011
35	Shipbuilding	October 27, 2011
36	Japanophiles – Bruce Huebner	November 3, 2011
37	Japanophiles – Muhō Noelke	November 10, 2011
38	Japanophiles – Matt Alt	November 17, 2011
39	Karaoke	November 24, 2011
40	Holidays	December 1, 2011
41	Red Sea Bream	December 8, 2011
42	Shopping Streets	December 15, 2011
43	Chickens and Eggs	December 22, 2011

=== Season 5 ===
January 2012 - December 2012
#	Name	Air Date
1	Ekiden	January 12, 2012
2	Batteries	January 19, 2012
3	Cafes	January 26, 2012
4	Hot Water Bottles and Pocket Warmers	February 2, 2012
5	Ikebana	February 9, 2012
6	Excavators	February 16, 2012
7	Woods & Forests	February 23, 2012
8	Japanophiles – Dhugal Lindsay	March 1, 2012
9	Japanophiles – Richard Emmert	March 8, 2012
10	Japanophiles – Art Lee	March 15, 2012
11	Japanophiles – Philip Harper	March 29, 2012
12	Kabuki	April 5, 2012
13	Wild Vegetables	April 12, 2012
14	Horses	April 19, 2012
15	Massage Chairs	April 26, 2012
16	Shikoku Pilgrimage	May 3, 2012
17	Regional Fast Food	May 10, 2012
18	Department Stores	May 17, 2012
19	Kimonos	May 24, 2012
20	Aquariums	June 7, 2012
21	Confectionery	June 14, 2012
22	Dolls	June 21, 2012
23	Moss	July 5, 2012
24	High School Baseball	July 12, 2012
25	Planetariums	July 19, 2012
26	Japanophiles – Adam Booth	August 16, 2012
27	Japanophiles – Dave Spector	August 23, 2012
28	Japanophiles – Euan Craig	August 30, 2012
29	Shamisen	September 6, 2012
30	Crested Ibises	September 13, 2012
31	Abalone	September 20, 2012
32	Tokyo Station	October 4, 2012
33	Tokyo Skytree	October 11, 2012
34	Tokyo Bay	October 18, 2012
35	Potatoes, Taros, and Yams	November 1, 2012
36	Name Seals	November 8, 2012
37	Mushrooms	November 15, 2012
38	Vending Machines	November 22, 2012
39	Scissors	December 6, 2012
40	Satsuma Mandarins	December 13, 2012
41	Gift-giving	December 20, 2012

=== Season 6 ===
January 2013 - December 2013
#	Name	Air Date
1	Sumo	January 10, 2013
2	Bathroom Scales	January 17, 2013
3	Enka	January 24, 2013
4	Small Factories	January 31, 2013
5	Japanophiles – Azby Brown	February 7, 2013
6	Japanophiles – Ernst Seiler	February 14, 2013
7	Japanophiles – Yasokichi Konishiki	February 21, 2013
8	Ume Plums	March 7, 2013
9	Storehouses	March 14, 2013
10	Wagyu	March 21, 2013
11	Uniforms	April 4, 2013
12	Rice Cookers	April 11, 2013
13	Burial Mounds	April 18, 2013
14	Stationery	April 25, 2013
15	Bread	May 2, 2013
16	Pine Trees	May 9, 2013
17	Parcel Delivery	May 16, 2013
18	Pro Wrestling	May 23, 2013
19	Strawberries	May 30, 2013
20	Calculators	June 13, 2013
21	Television	June 27, 2013
22	Lake Biwa	July 4, 2013
23	Expressways	July 11, 2013
24	Beer	July 18, 2013
25	Japanophiles – Mike Harris	August 1, 2013
26	Japanophiles – Karl Bengs	August 8, 2013
27	Japanophiles – Kenny Omega	August 15, 2013
28	Shakuhachi	September 5, 2013
29	Convenience Stores	September 12, 2013
30	Used Books	September 19, 2013
31	Women's Nylons	October 3, 2013
32	Remote Islands	October 10, 2013
33	Characters and Mascots	October 17, 2013
34	Grapes	October 24, 2013
35	Makeup	November 7, 2013
36	Ukiyo-e	November 14, 2013
37	Buses	November 21, 2013
38	Parties and Gatherings	December 5, 2013
39	Conveyor Belt Sushi	December 12, 2013
40	Pets	December 19, 2013

=== Season 7 ===
January 2014 - March 2014
#	Name	Air Date
1	Persimmons	January 9, 2014
2	Nighttime Scenery	January 16, 2014
3	Ise Jingu	January 23, 2014
4	K-cars	January 30, 2014
5	Japanophiles – Nancy Singleton Hachisu	February 13, 2014
6	Japanophiles – Chris Hart	February 20, 2014
7	Japanophiles – Rogier Uitenboogaart	February 27, 2014
8	Railways	March 6, 2014
9	Pianos	March 13, 2014
10	Squid	March 20, 2014

== List of Japanology Plus episodes ==
=== Season 1 ===
April 2014 - March 2016
#	Name	Air date
1	Bathhouses	April 3, 2014
2	Ramen	April 10, 2014
3	Mount Fuji	April 17, 2014
4	Shogi	April 24, 2014
5	Cherry Trees	May 1, 2014
6	Akihabara	May 8, 2014
7	Wagashi	May 15, 2014
8	Ninja	May 22, 2014
9	Rice	May 29, 2014
10	Castles	June 5, 2014
11	Japanophiles – Elizabeth Suzuki	July 3, 2014
12	Japanophiles – Everett Kennedy Brown	July 10, 2014
13	Japanophiles – Carolin Eckhardt	July 17, 2014
14	Karaoke Boxes	August 7, 2014
15	Bento	August 14, 2014
16	Bamboo	August 21, 2014
17	Taiko Drums	September 4, 2014
18	Tsukiji Market	September 11, 2014
19	Festivals	September 18, 2014
20	Japanese Gardens	September 25, 2014
21	Origami	October 2, 2014
22	Buddhist Statues	October 9, 2014
23	Yokai	October 16, 2014
24	Shinkansen	October 23, 2014
25	Lessons for Life	November 6, 2014
26	Robots	November 13, 2014
27	Sports Days	November 20, 2014
28	Bonsai	December 4, 2014
29	Sushi	December 11, 2014
30	Geisha	December 18, 2014
31	Japanophiles – Bartholomeus Greb	January 8, 2015
32	Japanophiles – Ivan Vartanian	January 15, 2015
33	Japanophiles – Alex Bennett	January 22, 2015
34	The Seikan Tunnel	February 5, 2015
35	Snow Country	February 12, 2015
36	Comedy	February 19, 2015
37	Tokyo Metropolitan Expressway	April 2, 2015
38	A Season of Change	April 16, 2015
39	Waste and Recycling	April 23, 2015
40	Period Dramas	April 30, 2015
41	The Weight Loss Industry	May 7, 2015
42	Dams	May 14, 2015
43	Izakaya	May 28, 2015
44	Craft Beer	June 4, 2015
45	Fermented Foods	June 11, 2015
46	Umbrellas	June 18, 2015
47	Job Hunting	June 25, 2015
48	Japanophiles - Amir Takahashi	July 9, 2015
49	The English Conversation Business	July 16, 2015
50	English at School	July 23, 2015
51	Shrine & Temple Carpenters	August 6, 2015
52	Bunraku	August 12, 2015
53	Kids' Summer Holidays	September 3, 2015
54	Swimming	September 10, 2015
55	Haunted Houses	September 17, 2015
56	Onsen	October 1, 2015
57	Japanophiles - Andrew Mancabelli	October 8, 2015
58	Cameras	October 15, 2015
59	Wrapping and Packaging	October 22, 2015
60	Tokyo Housing	November 12, 2015
61	Japanophiles - Adam Zgola	November 19, 2015
62	Kombu	November 26, 2015
63	Hotels and Inns	December 3, 2015
64	Tidying Up	December 10, 2015
65	Mt. Takao	December 17, 2015
66	Japanophiles - Maud Archambault	January 7, 2016
67	Silk	January 14, 2016
68	Underground Tokyo	January 28, 2016
69	Earthquake Preparedness	February 11, 2016
70	Japanophiles - Jorge Cabeza Fernandez	February 25, 2016
71	Japanophiles - Pico Iyer	March 3, 2016
72	Okinawan Dance	March 17, 2016

=== Season 2 ===
April 2016 - March 2019
#	Name	Air date
01	Whisky	April 7, 2016
02	Quest for Perfect Skin	April 14, 2016
03	Bladed Tools	April 21, 2016
04	Family Crests	May 5, 2016
05	Breakfast	May 12, 2016
06	Footwear	May 19, 2016
07	Running	June 2, 2016
08	Emoji	June 16, 2016
09	Ekiben	June 23, 2016
10	Bicycles	June 30, 2016
11	Kimono	July 7, 2016
12	Kokeshi Dolls	July 28, 2016
13	Shinise - Long-Established Businesses	August 4, 2016
14	Japanophiles: Rezaul Karim Chowdhury	August 11, 2016
15	Toilets	August 18, 2016
16	Bridges	August 25, 2016
17	A Nation of Singers	September 1, 2016
18	Restoring Castles	September 8, 2016
19	Volcanoes	September 29, 2016
20	School Club Activities	October 6, 2016
21	Smells	October 13, 2016
22	Paper	October 20, 2016
23	Japanophiles: Paul Lorimer	November 3, 2016
24	Katsuobushi	December 1, 2016
25	Day Care for Kids	December 8, 2016
26	Sweets and Snacks	December 15, 2016
27	Hairdressing	December 22, 2016
28	Japanophiles: Carine Lafitte	January 5, 2017
29	Noh Theater	January 26, 2017
30	Moving Services	February 2, 2017
31	Okinawan Karate	February 9, 2017
32	Sleep	February 16, 2017
33	Tokyo Rail Network	February 23, 2017
34	Denim	March 2, 2017
35	Japanophiles: Randy Channell Soei	March 9, 2017
36	Japanophiles: Zoe Vincent	March 30, 2017
37	Buddhist Altars	April 4, 2017
38	Driving Schools	April 12, 2017
39	Curry	April 19, 2017
40	Cafes	May 2, 2017
41	Japanophiles: Yoram Ofer	May 23, 2017
42	School Lunch	June 6, 2017
43	Capsule Toys	June 20, 2017
44	Buses	June 27, 2017
45	Traditional Music	July 4, 2017
46	Traditional Music in Modern Life	July 11, 2017
47	Japanophiles: Nsenda Lukumwena	July 18, 2017
48	Urban Renewal	August 1, 2017
49	Fireworks	August 15, 2017
50	Anthropomorphism	August 22, 2017
51	2D Characters: Origins and Evolution	August 29, 2017
52	Children and Sports	September 5, 2017
53	Amusement Parks	September 12, 2017
54	Japanophiles: Tyler Lynch	September 26, 2017
55	Particle Physics Research	October 3, 2017
56	Shrine Duties	October 17, 2017
57	Special Rescue Teams	October 24, 2017
58	The Wonders of Air Travel	October 31, 2017
59	Japanophiles: Fernando Lopez	November 21, 2017
60	Changing Perceptions of Cars	November 28, 2017
61	The Way of Tea: Wellspring of Omotenashi, Part 1	December 12, 2017
62	The Way of Tea: Wellspring of Omotenashi, Part 2	December 19, 2017
63	Ocean Fishing	January 9, 2018
64	The Police	January 16, 2018
65	Japanophiles: Stephanie Tomiyasu	January 23, 2018
66	New Trends in Logistics	February 6, 2018
67	Game Arcades	February 13, 2018
68	Snow Removal	February 20, 2018
69	Shopping Streets	March 6, 2018
70	Japanophiles: Bjorn Heiberg	March 13, 2018
71	Regional Transport Crisis	March 20, 2018
72	Miniature Culture	March 27, 2018
73	Marriage	April 3, 2018
74	100 Yen Shops	April 10, 2018
75	Deep-fried Food	April 17, 2018
76	Lighthouses	May 1, 2018
77	Japanophiles: David E. Wells	May 22, 2018
78	Industrial Heritage	June 5, 2018
79	Graves	June 19, 2018
80	Rice Cultivation	June 26, 2018
81	The Ogasawara Islands: A Multicultural Heritage	July 3, 2018
82	The Ogasawara Islands: A Turbulent History	July 10, 2018
83	Japanophiles: Bruce Gutlove	July 17, 2018
84	Roadside Stations	July 31, 2018
85	Summer Resorts	August 7, 2018
86	Yurei: Japanese Ghosts	August 21, 2018
87	Radio Calisthenics	September 4, 2018
88	Underground Shopping Streets	September 11, 2018
89	Japanophiles: Jagmohan S. Chandrani	September 25, 2018
90	A Sense of the Divine	October 2, 2018
91	Earthquake-resistant Architecture	October 9, 2018
92	School Sports Days	October 16, 2018
93	School Satchels	October 30, 2018
94	Aquariums	November 6, 2018
95	Onigiri: Rice Balls	November 13, 2018
96	Japanophiles: David Stanley Hewett	November 20, 2018
97	Coffee	November 27, 2018
98	Meiji-era Advisors	December 11, 2018
99	School Uniforms	December 18, 2018
100	Soba Restaurants	December 25, 2018
101	Roof Tilers	January 8, 2019
102	Japanophiles: Thomas Bertrand	January 29, 2019
103	Hidden Christians: Part 1	February 19, 2019
104	Hidden Christians: Part 2	February 26, 2019
105	Wood: Culture	March 5, 2019
106	Wood: Carpentry	March 12, 2019
107	Japanophiles: Oussouby Sacko	March 19, 2019
108	Meat	March 26, 2019

=== Season 3 ===
April 2019 - March 2021
#	Name	Air date
01	Popular Theater	April 2, 2019
02	Oni: Japanese Ogres	April 16, 2019
03	Japanese Dog Breeds	April 30, 2019
04	Japanophiles: Peter MacMillan	May 21, 2019
05	Konamon: Flour-based Cuisine	June 11, 2019
06	Frozen Food	June 25, 2019
07	Slippers	July 9, 2019
08	Japanophiles: Ondrej Hybl	July 23, 2019
09	Tokyo: Water	July 30, 2019
10	Tokyo: Backstreets and Alleys	August 6, 2019
11	Mechanical Dolls	August 27, 2019
12	Swords	September 10, 2019
13	Bathrooms	October 1, 2019
14	Japanophiles: David Atkinson	October 8, 2019
15	Monkeys	October 15, 2019
16	Banknotes	November 5, 2019
17	Plasterwork	November 12, 2019
18	Japanophiles: Wolfgang Loeger	November 19, 2019
19	Insects	December 3, 2019
20	Donburi: Rice Bowls	December 10, 2019
21	Osechi: New Year's Food	January 7, 2020
22	Japanophiles: Thomas Ainsworth	January 28, 2020
23	Sunakku Bars	February 18, 2020
24	Tohoku Nine Years On: Living with Ghosts	March 10, 2020
25	Tohoku Nine Years On: Voices of the Deceased	March 17, 2020
26	Japanophiles: Harold George Meij	March 24, 2020
27	Laundry Services	April 7, 2020
28	Miso	April 21, 2020
29	Japanophiles: Johan Nilsson Bjoerk	August 4, 2020
30	Japan vs. Epidemics	August 18, 2020
31	Wasabi	September 1, 2020
32	Geisha: A Sunset Trade?	September 8, 2020
33	Expert Craft Skills	September 15, 2020
34	Japanophiles: Kim Seungbok	September 29, 2020
35	Aloha Shirts	October 6, 2020
36	Japanophiles: Gyoei Saile	October 13, 2020
37	Rice Snacks	October 20, 2020
38	Urban Workshops	November 3, 2020
39	Tokyo Rooftops	November 10, 2020
40	Tokyo Stories #1: Josh Grisdale	November 17, 2020
41	Tokyo Stories #2: Mateusz Urbanowicz	November 24, 2020
42	Japanophiles: Anna Bugaeva	December 1, 2020
43	Mushrooms	December 22, 2020
44	Kamishibai: Paper Theater	December 29, 2020
45	Moss	January 12, 2021
46	Libraries	January 19, 2021
47	Japanophiles: Sheila Cliffe	January 26, 2021
48	Ukiyo-e	February 2, 2021
49	Japanophiles: Richard Halberstadt	March 16, 2021

=== Season 4 ===
April 2021 - March 2022
#	Name	Air date
01	Cleaning Tools	April 8, 2021
02	Lacquerware	April 22, 2021
03	Suits	May 6, 2021
04	Emergency Goods	May 13, 2021
05	Japanophiles: Chad Mullane	May 27, 2021
06	Furoshiki: Wrapping Cloths	June 3, 2021
07	Japan vs. Epidemics, Part 2: Modern History	June 17, 2021
08	Tiny Houses	July 1, 2021
09	Watches & Clocks	July 8, 2021
10	Plastic Food Samples	July 15, 2021
11	Japanophiles: Asa Ekstrom	July 29, 2021
12	Cats and Japan	August 5, 2021
13	Personal Robots	September 2, 2021
14	Scissors	September 16, 2021
15	Japanophiles: Marty Friedman	September 30, 2021
16	Luck	October 7, 2021
17	Tatami	October 28, 2021
18	Chests & Cabinets	November 11, 2021
19	Japanophiles: Nicholas Rennick	December 2, 2021
20	Bamboo	December 16, 2021
21	Ainu: A National Museum of Ainu Culture	December 23, 2021
22	Ainu: A New Generation	December 30, 2021
23	Japanophiles: Tom Hovasse	January 6, 2022
24	Kotatsu: Heated Tables	January 13, 2022
25	VTubers	January 20, 2022
26	Traditional Homes	February 17, 2022
27	Jomon Period: The Sannai Maruyama Site	March 10, 2022
28	Jomon Period: Dogu	March 17, 2022
29	Japanophiles: Steve Tallon	March 24, 2022

=== Season 5 ===
April 2022 - Ongoing
#	Name	Air date
1	Face Masks	April 14, 2022
2	Washi: Japanese Paper	April 28, 2022
3	Name Stamps and Seals	May 12, 2022
4	Showa Nostalgia	May 19, 2022
5	Japanophiles: Claudio Feliciani	June 2, 2022
6	Keitora: Tiny Trucks	June 16, 2022
7	Vinyl Records	June 30, 2022
8	Okinawa: The Ryukyu Kingdom	July 14, 2022
9	Okinawa: The Reconstruction of Shuri Castle	July 21, 2022
10	Frozen Food	July 28, 2022
11	Japanophiles: Gregory Khezrnejat	August 11, 2022
12	Goldfish	August 25, 2022
13	Welfare Goods	September 8, 2022
14	Water-related Disasters	September 29, 2022
15	Japanophiles: Andrew Dewar	October 13, 2022
16	The Moon	October 20, 2022
17	Cardboard	November 24, 2022
18	The Samurai of the Sea: Pirates or Protectors?	December 8, 2022
19	The Samurai of the Sea: The Murakami Legacy	December 15, 2022
20	Japanophiles: Colleen Schmuckal	December 22, 2022
21	Kitchens	January 12, 2023
22	Satsumaimo: Sweet Potatoes	February 9, 2023
23	Dinosaurs	March 2, 2023
24	Japanophiles: Kyle Holzhueter	March 23, 2023
25	Camping	April 13, 2023
26	Male Aesthetics	April 27, 2023
27	Konnyaku	May 11, 2023
28	Japanophiles: Isabelle Sasaki	May 25, 2023
29	Ueno	June 8, 2023
30	Meteorological Data	June 22, 2023
31	Amami Oshima: Paradise Found	July 6, 2023
32	Amami Oshima: Shaped by Adversity	July 13, 2023
33	Japanophiles: Francesco Panto	August 3, 2023
34	Vacant Homes	August 17, 2023
35	Rokyoku: Musical Storytelling	August 31, 2023
36	Japanese Honeybees	September 14, 2023
37	Japanophiles: Martin Holman	September 28, 2023
38	Unused Fish	October 12, 2023
39	Garbage	October 26, 2023
40	Firefighting	November 9, 2023
41	Japanophiles: Benjamin Flatt	November 23, 2023
42	Izumo: Home of the Gods	December 7, 2023
43	Izumo: Land of the Supernatural	December 14, 2023
44	Active Seniors	January 4, 2024
45	Forestry	January 25, 2024
46	Japanophiles: Matthew Headland	March 7, 2024
47	20th Anniversary Special Part 1	March 21, 2024
48	20th Anniversary Special Part 2	March 28, 2024
49	Washing Machines	April 11, 2024
50	New Roles for Vacant Homes	April 25, 2024
51	Japanophiles: Nicoleta Oprișan	May 9, 2024
52	Wakocha: Japanese Black Tea	May 23, 2024
53	Plastic Models	June 6, 2024
54	Food Tech Products	June 20, 2024
55	Kumano: The Practice of Shugendo	July 11, 2024
56	Kumano: Journey of a Maverick Scholar	July 18, 2024
57	Japanophiles: Lekh Raj Juneja	August 1, 2024
58	Eyeglasses	August 15, 2024
59	Service Areas	August 29, 2024
60	Tanuki	September 12, 2024
61	Japanophiles: Stephanie Crohin	September 26, 2024
62	Heavy Machinery	October 10, 2024
63	Graves and End-of-Life Planning	October 24, 2024
64	Under Elevated Train Tracks	November 7, 2024
65	Japanophiles: Adam Smith	November 21, 2024
66	Uesugi Yozan: An Economic Miracle	December 12, 2024
67	Uesugi Yozan: All for His People	December 19, 2024
68	Onigiri	January 9, 2025
69	Repair	January 23, 2025
70	Japanophiles: Johan Leutwiler	February 13, 2025
71	Octupuses	February 27, 2025
72	Leather Shoes	March 13, 2025
73	Torii	April 10, 2025
74	Mamachari	April 24, 2025
75	Japanophiles: Stephen Turner	May 8, 2025
76	Family Restaurants	May 22, 2025
77	Natto	June 5, 2025
78	Stationery	June 19, 2025
79	Tosa: The Life of John Manjiro	July 10, 2025
80	Tosa: Blessings and Perils of the Kuroshio Current	July 17, 2025
81	Japanophiles: Johan Nordstrom	July 31, 2025
82	Origami	August 14, 2025
83	Sake	August 28, 2025
84	Offices	September 11, 2025
85	Japanophiles: Ziaul Karim	September 25, 2025
86	Bookstores	October 9, 2025
87	Convenience Stores	October 23, 2025
88	Sleep	November 6, 2025
89	Japanophiles: Astrid Klein & Mark Dytham	November 20, 2025
90	Hagi: The Life of Yoshida Shoin	December 11, 2025
91	Hagi: Castle Town Forged by Magma	December 18, 2025
92	Glasswork	January 8, 2026
93	Fragrances	January 22, 2026
94	Salmon	February 12, 2026
95	Japanophiles: Phillip Richards	February 26, 2026
96	Danchi Housing Complexes	March 12, 2026
97	Jazz Kissa	April 9, 2026
98	Chokatsu: Improving Gut Health	April 23, 2026
99	Sashiko Embroidery	May 7, 2026
100	Seaweed	May 21, 2026
101	Kyoto Confectionery	June 4, 2026
102	Tidying Up	June 18, 2026
103	Aizu: Unbreakable Spirit of Noguchi Hideyo	July 16, 2026
104	Aizu: Heartland of the Samurai	July 23, 2026
105	Food Stalls	August 6, 2026
106	Solo-Katsu	August 20, 2026
107	Eggs	September 3, 2026
108	Kutani Ware	September 17, 2026
109	Japanophiles: Curtis Patterson	October 1, 2026
