= Sodō Yokoyama =

- Title: Rōshi

Personal life
- Born: 1907 Sendai, Japan
- Died: 1980 (aged 72–73)

Religious life
- Religion: Buddhism
- School: Sōtō
- Dharma name: Sodō

Senior posting
- Teacher: Kodo Sawaki
- Successor: Jōkō Shibata

Sodō Yokoyama (横山祖道, Yokoyama Sodō) was a Japanese Sōtō Zen teacher of the 20th century. Also known as the Leaf Flute Zen Master (草笛禅師, Kusabue Zenji), he was famous for residing in a public park in Komoro in Nagano Prefecture where he practiced zazen and played songs for travelers by whistling on a leaf. He had resided at Antai-ji for eight years from 1949 to 1957 as a student of Kodo Sawaki before moving to Komoro in 1959. He continued his life in the park until his death in 1980.

== See also ==
- Slek leaf whistle or flute as used in Cambodia. Same type of instrument that Sodō Yokoyama played, different culture.
