= Musical leaf =

Cambodian musical instrument

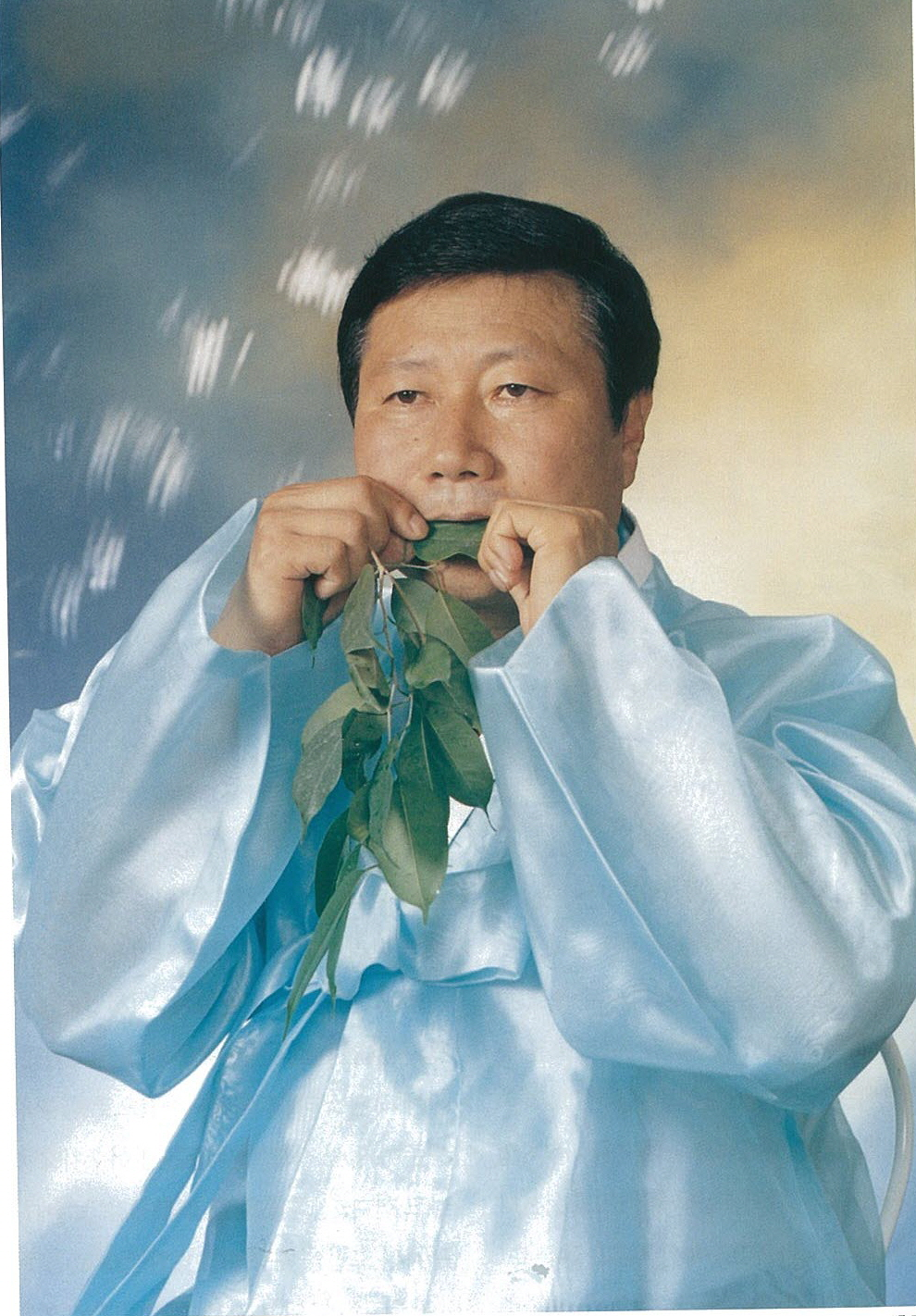
- Park Chan-beom playing the choboek

Sound sample
- Musical playing of phlom slek, recorded in Siem Reap, Cambodia

The musical leaf is one of any leaves used to play music on. It goes by many names, including leaflute, leaf flute, leaf whistle, gum leaf, and leafophone.

Cambodian music including phlom slek as an instrument

In Cambodia, it is called a slek (Khmer: ស្លឹក) and is played by country people in Cambodia, made from the leaves of broad-leaf trees, including the sakrom and khnoung trees. It is also known as phlom slek, 'blow leaf.' To play a leaf, the musician curls the edge of a leaf into a semi-circle (along the leaf's long edge) and "places the arch between the lips", making sure that the leaf is touching both upper and lower lips. The leaf vibrates in contact with them as the player blows air across it. The player can control the pitch of the noise with their upper lip.

In South Korea, it is called a chojeok (Hangul:초적) and it is a designated intangible cultural heritage asset.

An instrument of country people, it has been observed being played by herders riding their water buffalo in the rice fields. While it is used to imitate sounds wild animals make, it can produce sustained sound, a sharp, high-pitched whistle. Players can control the pitch and make songs, normally solo, but sometimes with other instruments.

Similar instruments are used in other places under different names and from the leaves of different species, such as the gum leaf (from eucalypts) in Australia, grass flutes in Japan, the pipirma in Nepal, and tree leaf flute in China.

== Structure of a musical leaf ==
"Leaf instruments occur in many music-cultures notwithstanding a sense that gumleaf sounds 'belong' to Australia. Unlike the complex leaf-derived instruments of Australia's closest neighbours in the Indian Ocean littoral and Oceania, the 'gumleaf' is composed of unmodified organic leaf matter."

To play a leaf, one can pluck a leaf or play it while it is still on the plant. The leaf needs to be slightly curved and placed in the mouth. However, not all leaves can produce a sound as it requires the correct rigidity, flexibility and thickness. If the leaves wilt, they lose turgor pressure which makes them not rigid enough to play. In Germany and Austria shepherds modified the bark of birch trees to play similarly. However, unlike leaves, they do not wilt allowing the musician to play for longer periods of time.

== Range ==
Much like whistling, the range of a leafophone depends on the size of the players mouth and mostly playing in the higher registers. Through breathing techniques which open the throat, therefore increasing the size of the resonance chamber, one can achieve playing lower notes. Additionally using thicker leaves makes it is possible to reach lower notes that require far more air to set the leaf in vibration. If a musical piece requires low notes, often the player will raise those notes by an octave. The player can play a 2–3 octave range depending on the leaf used.

== Timbre ==
Through use of a high-speed camera, one can see that the leaf moves away from the lips when the player blows and its elasticity brings it back onto the lip. This oscillating movement sets it in vibration to produce a sound. An analysis of the overtone series comparing an oboe and birkenblatt (birch leaf) playing the note F2 are nearly identical.

== Variants in other places ==
While called slek in Cambodia, the instrument is used in other places under different names. In China, recorded knowledge of the wood leaf (木叶, Mù yè) as an instrument dates back to the Tang dynasty, 7th to 10th centuries A.D. It is depicted in a sculpture at the tomb of Emperor Wang Jian of the Five Dynasties in Chengdu, Sichuan. In modern times, plastic has been substituted for the leaf, and the instrument has been recorded and used in movie music. With synthetic materials, the instrument does not wear out quickly while playing, and has a range of nearly three octaves.

- China, 樹葉笛 (Shùyè dí) tree leaf flute
- China, 草琴 (Cǎoqín), grass piano
- China, 木叶 (Mù yè) wood leaves
- Japan, 草笛, grass flute or grass whistle
- Australia, gum leaf
- Nepal, पिपिरिमा (pipirma)
- Brazil, folhinha
- Germany and Austria, Birkenblattblasen
- Albania and Kosovo,

The Make Music festival 2021 featured the leaf as a musical instrument.

== Notable players ==
- Herb Patten (in German)
- Levi Celerio
- Sodō Yokoyama, Japanese man known as the Leaf Flute Zen Master (草笛禅師)

== See also ==
- Music of Cambodia

== Bibliography ==
- Ledgerwood, Judy., Mortland, Carol A.. Cambodian Culture Since 1975: Homeland and Exile. United States: Cornell University Press, 2018.
- The Garland Handbook of Southeast Asian Music. N.p.: Taylor & Francis, 2011.
- Mizerski, Jim. Cambodia Captured: Angkor's First Photographers in 1860's Colonial Intrigues. Portugal: Jamine Image Machine, 2016.
- Trankell, Ing-Britt., Ovesen, Jan. Cambodians and Their Doctors: A Medical Anthropology of Colonial and Postcolonial Cambodia. Denmark: NIAS Press, 2010.
