= Yumura Onsen (Hyogo) =

Thermal spring area in Hyōgo Prefecture, Japan

Coordinates: 35°33′17.79″N 134°29′17.16″E

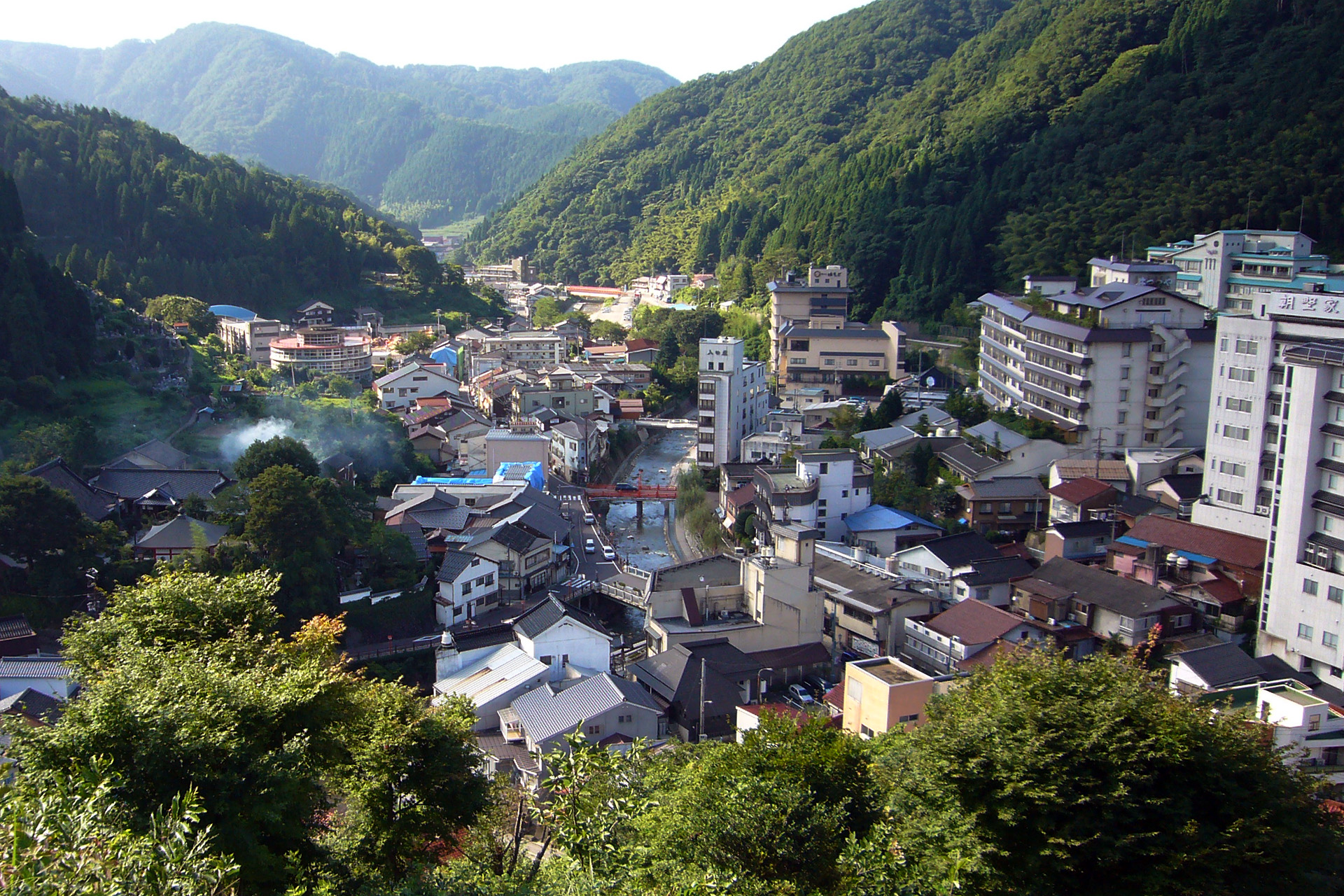
Yumura Onsen

Yumura Onsen (湯村温泉) is a small village located in Shin'onsen town in Mikata District, Hyōgo Prefecture, Japan. As of 2011, Yumura township had a population of 1,206, and its surrounding area (known as Onsen) had a total population of 6,454. Local legend states that the town's hot springs (onsen) were uncovered in AD848 by the priest Jikaku Daishi. The town is said to have been inhabited since this time, and the local temple is claimed to have been built soon after the discovery of the hot springs.

Here is one of the major geosites of San'in Kaigan Global Geopark.

== Climate ==
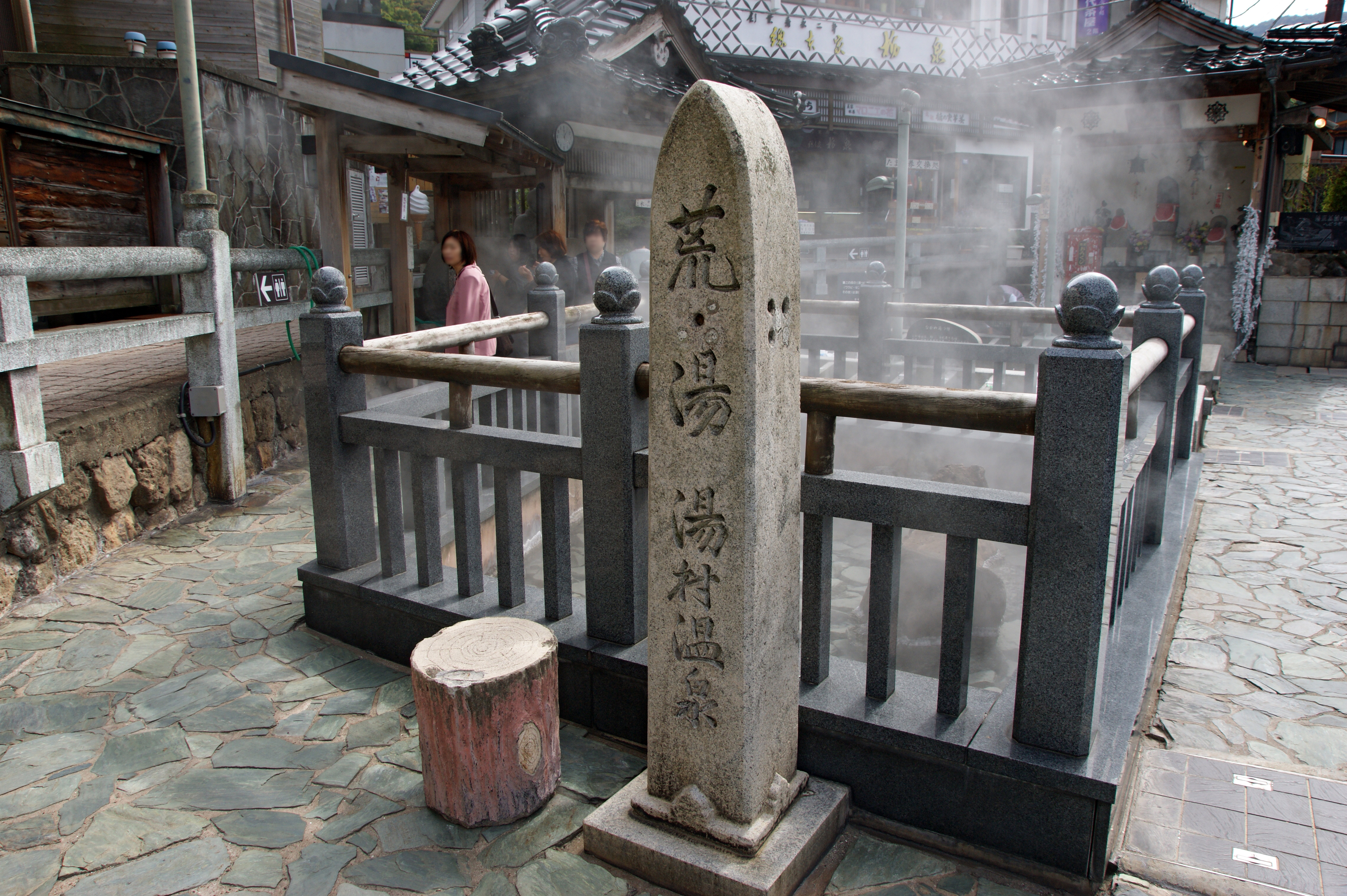
Hot spring "Arayu"

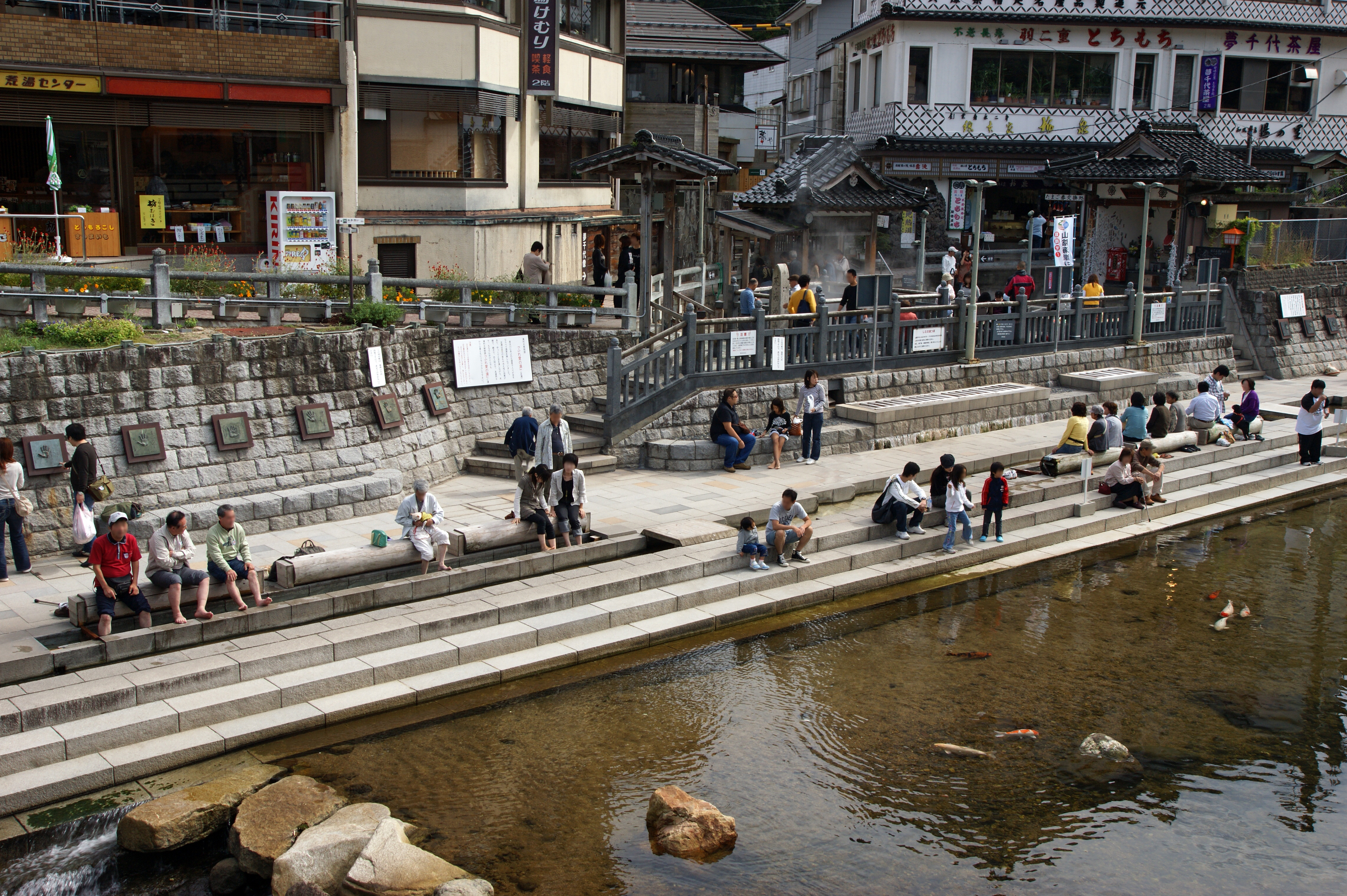
Ashiyu "Fureainoyu"

Like most towns in northern Hyogo Prefecture, Yumura experiences disparate seasonal weather. Summers are typically very hot and humid (with an average daily high of 23.3 °C), while winter brings cold temperatures (an average daily high of 5.3 °C) and much snow.

== Hot springs ==
The name 'Yumura' literally means 'hot spring village', and the hot springs play an important role in the town. Yumura's hot springs have an unusually high temperature of 98 °C, and generate most of the town's tourism. Tourists flock to the hot springs in weekends to boil eggs (onsen tamago), corn, and sweet potato in the boiling water and to enjoy soaking in the hot spring baths. In the past the townsfolk used the hot springs for much of their daily cooking. While most people do not use it as frequently now, many people still cook bamboo, vegetables and mountain herbs in the hot springs' water.

== Sightseeing ==
While its popularity with tourists has been declining of late, the town has long been popular with tourists from the local Kansai area. Yumura became well known after it was the setting for Yumechiyo-nikki (Yumechiyo’s Diary) – a fictional television drama starring Sayuri Yoshinaga as geisha Yumechiyo, a Hiroshima atomic bomb survivor. The movie and television show were filmed at various locations within the town, and aired in the 1980s. In 2001 the town opened its newly renovated town centre, which included a statue of Yumechiyo near a former filming location. A museum also opened, and currently displays various props and costumes used in the show, and replicates some of the more well-known sets. Because of the show, Yumura has a connection with Hiroshima, and strings of paper cranes (sembazuru) folded by locals and tourists are regularly sent to Hiroshima.

Other local sightseeing spots include the San-in Kaigan National Park (this coastline was once a part of the Asian mainland, and features many beaches, caves and rock formations) and Tajima Bokujo Park (a farm park where visitors can interact with animals and experience making traditional local cuisine). There is also a skifield open at Bokujo Park during the winter months.

== Food ==
Onsen area is well known locally for its Tajima beef. From the breed of Tajima gyu (Tajima cattle) that Kobe beef cattle are selected from, Tajima beef is processed from black cattle farmed in the mountains around Yumura Onsen, as well as in many other places in Tajima area. Black cattle are traditionally bred and raised in Tajima, and are often sold before being raised and processed as Kobe or Matsusaka beef.

== Annual events ==
- Yumura Onsen festival - held on the first Sunday in June, and includes a 100-metre tug-of-war involving the whole town.
- Tajima beef festival - held on the fourth Sunday in September, and offers free Tajima beef steaks to festival goers.
- Hide-and-Seek Competition - held in the town on Sunday in late June. Approximately 250 people hide in the town while 350 competitors race to find someone to bring back to the start line.

In addition, the nearby port town of Hamasaka (also in Shin’onsen town) holds annual Matsuba crab and firefly squid festivals in mid-September and early April respectively.
