= Onsen, Hyōgo =

Dissolved municipality in Mikata district, Hyōgo prefecture, Japan

Onsen (温泉町, Onsen-chō) was a town located in Mikata District, Hyōgo Prefecture, Japan.

== Etymology ==
Onsen is the Japanese word for hot springs and the town is named for Yumura Onsen, the local hot springs.

== Population ==
As of 2003, the town had an estimated population of 7,087 and a density of 51.35 persons per km^{2}. The total area was 138.02 km^{2}.

== Merge ==
On October 1, 2005, Onsen, along with the town of Hamasaka (also from Mikata District), was merged to create the town of Shin'onsen.
