= Moroyose Station =

Railway station in Shin'onsen, Hyōgo Prefecture, Japan

Moroyose Station 諸寄駅
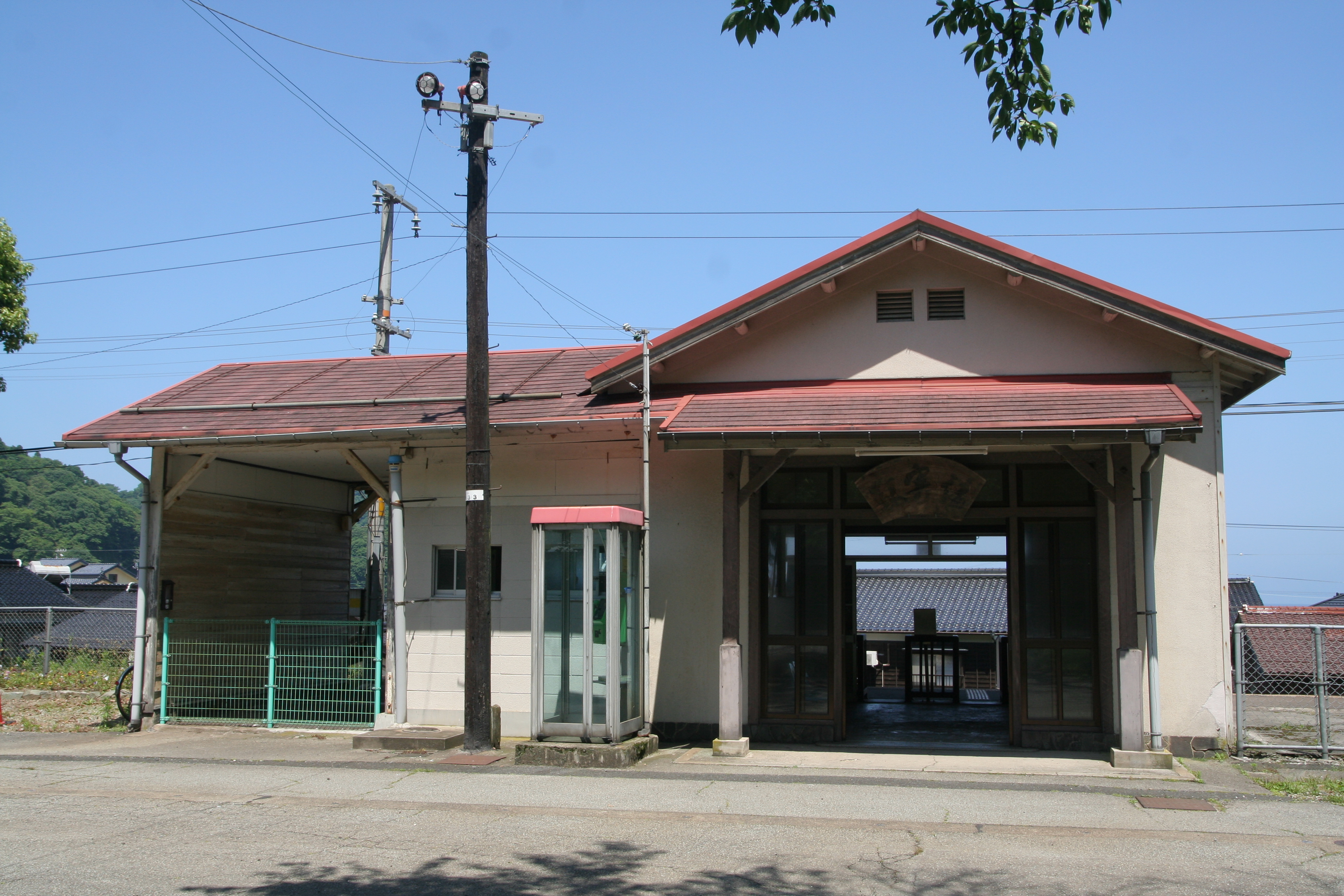
- Moroyose Station, June 2010

General information
- Location: Moroyose, Shin'onsen-machi, Mikata-gun, Hyōgo-ken 669-6753; Japan
- Coordinates: 35.6197°N 134.4345°E
- Owner: West Japan Railway Company
- Operator: West Japan Railway Company
- Line: San'in Main Line
- Distance: 199.8 km (124.1 miles) from Kyoto
- Platforms: 1 side platform
- Connections: Bus stop

Other information
- Status: Unstaffed
- Website: Official website

History
- Opened: 18 July 1931

Passengers
- FY2016: 49 daily
Location
- Location within Hyōgo Prefecture Location within Japan

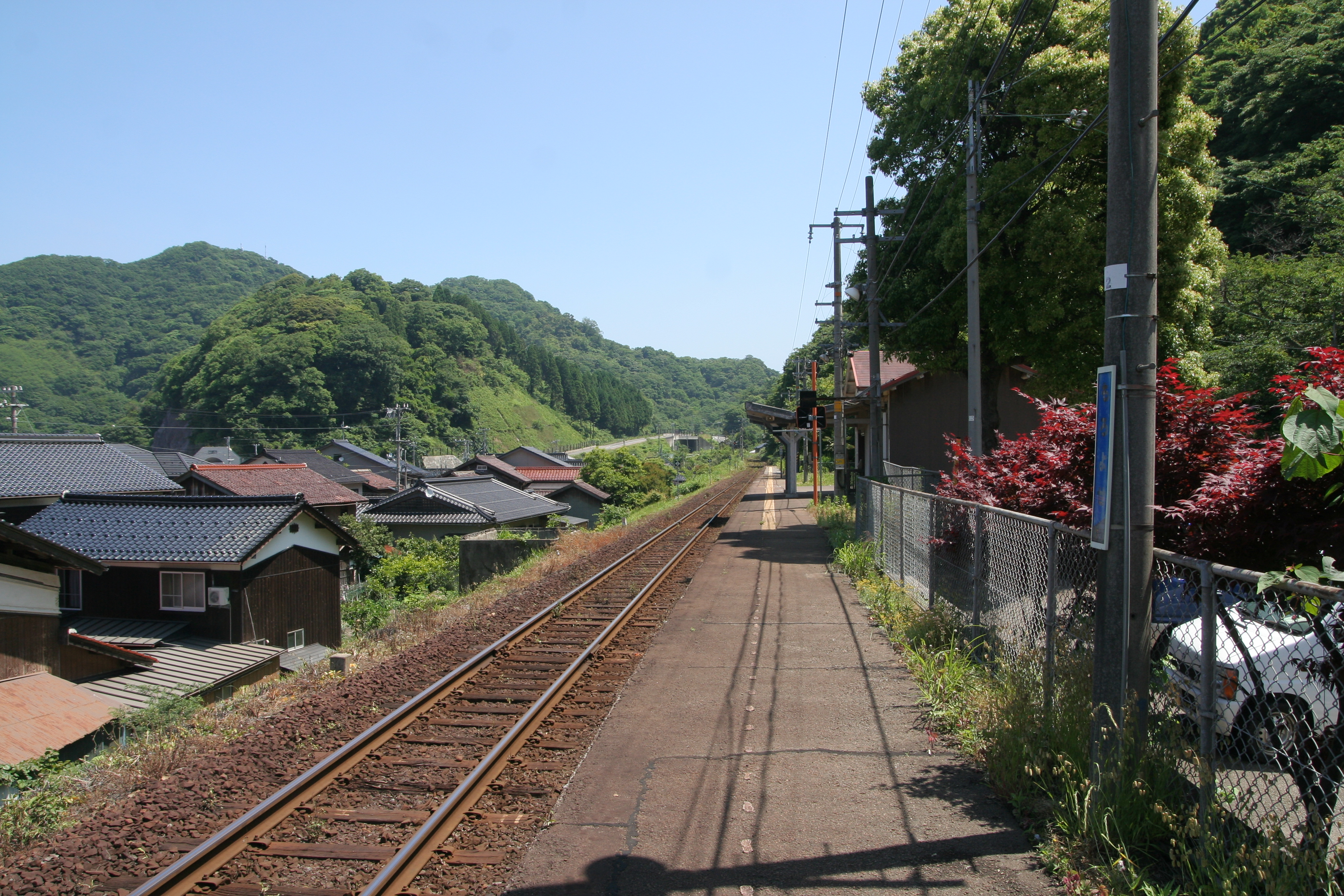
JR West Japan premises of Moroyose Station (for Hamasaka)

Moroyose Station (諸寄駅, Moroyose-eki) is a passenger railway station located in the town of Shin'onsen, Mikata District, Hyōgo, Japan, operated by West Japan Railway Company (JR West).

== Lines ==
Moroyose Station is served by the San'in Main Line, and is located 199.8 kilometers from the terminus of the line at Kyoto.

== Station layout ==
The station consists of one ground-level side platform serving single bi-directional track. The station is unattended.

== Adjacent stations ==
«	Service	»
West Japan Railway Company (JR West) San'in Main Line
Limited Express Hamakaze: Does not stop at this station
Hamasaka	Local	Igumi

== History ==
Moroyose Station opened on July 18, 1931, as a temporary stop that was in operation only seasonally. It was upgraded to a full station on June 1, 1938.

== Passenger statistics ==
In fiscal 2016, the station was used by an average of 49 passengers daily

== Surrounding area ==
- Moroyose Beach
- Moroyose Post Office
- Japan National Route 178

== See also ==
- List of railway stations in Japan
