= Higashihama Station =

Railway station in Iwami, Tottori Prefecture, Japan

Higashihama Station 東浜駅
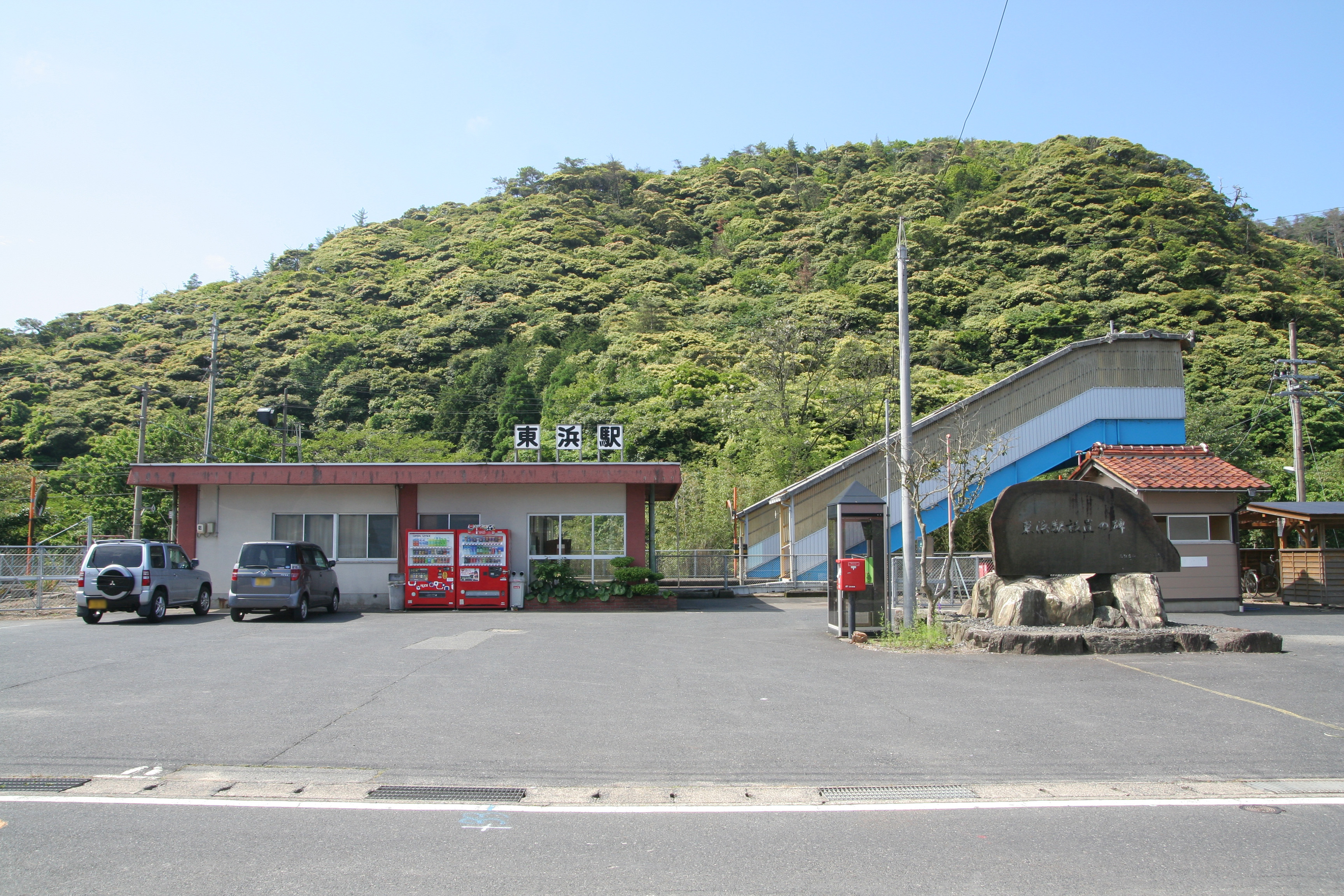
- Higashihama Station, June 2010

General information
- Location: Kugami, Iwami-cho, Iwami-gun, Tottori-ken 681-0011; Japan
- Coordinates: 35°35′58.99″N 134°21′45.61″E
- Owner: JR West
- Operator: JR West
- Line: San'in Main Line
- Distance: 207.5 km (128.9 miles) from Kyoto
- Platforms: 2 side platforms
- Connections: Bus stop

Other information
- Status: Unstaffed
- Website: Official website

History
- Opened: 1 January 1950

Passengers
- FY2018: 58 daily
Location
- Location within Tottori Prefecture Location within Japan

Higashihama Station (東浜駅, Higashihama-eki) is a passenger railway station located in the town of Iwami, Iwami District, Tottori Prefecture, Japan. It is operated by the West Japan Railway Company (JR West).

== Lines ==
Higashihama Station is served by the San'in Main Line, and is located 207.5 kilometers from the terminus of the line at Kyoto. Only local trains stop at this station.

== Station layout ==
The station consists of two ground-level opposed side platforms, connected by a footbridge. The station is unattended.

=== Platforms ===
1	■ San'in Main Line	for Hamasaka and Toyooka
2	■ San'in Main Line	for Tottori and Yonago

== Adjacent stations ==
«	Service	»
West Japan Railway Company (JR West) San'in Main Line
Limited Express Hamakaze: Does not stop at this station
Igumi	Local	Iwami

== History ==
Higashihama Station opened on January 1, 1950. With the privatization of the Japan National Railways (JNR) on April 1, 1987, the station came under the aegis of the West Japan Railway Company.

== Passenger statistics ==
In fiscal 2018, the station was used by an average of 58 passengers daily.

== Surrounding area ==
The north of the station is the Sea of Japan, and the coast near the station is open to the public as Higashihama Beach.

== See also ==
- List of railway stations in Japan
