= Igumi Station =

Railway station in Shin'onsen, Hyōgo Prefecture, Japan

Igumi Station 久谷駅
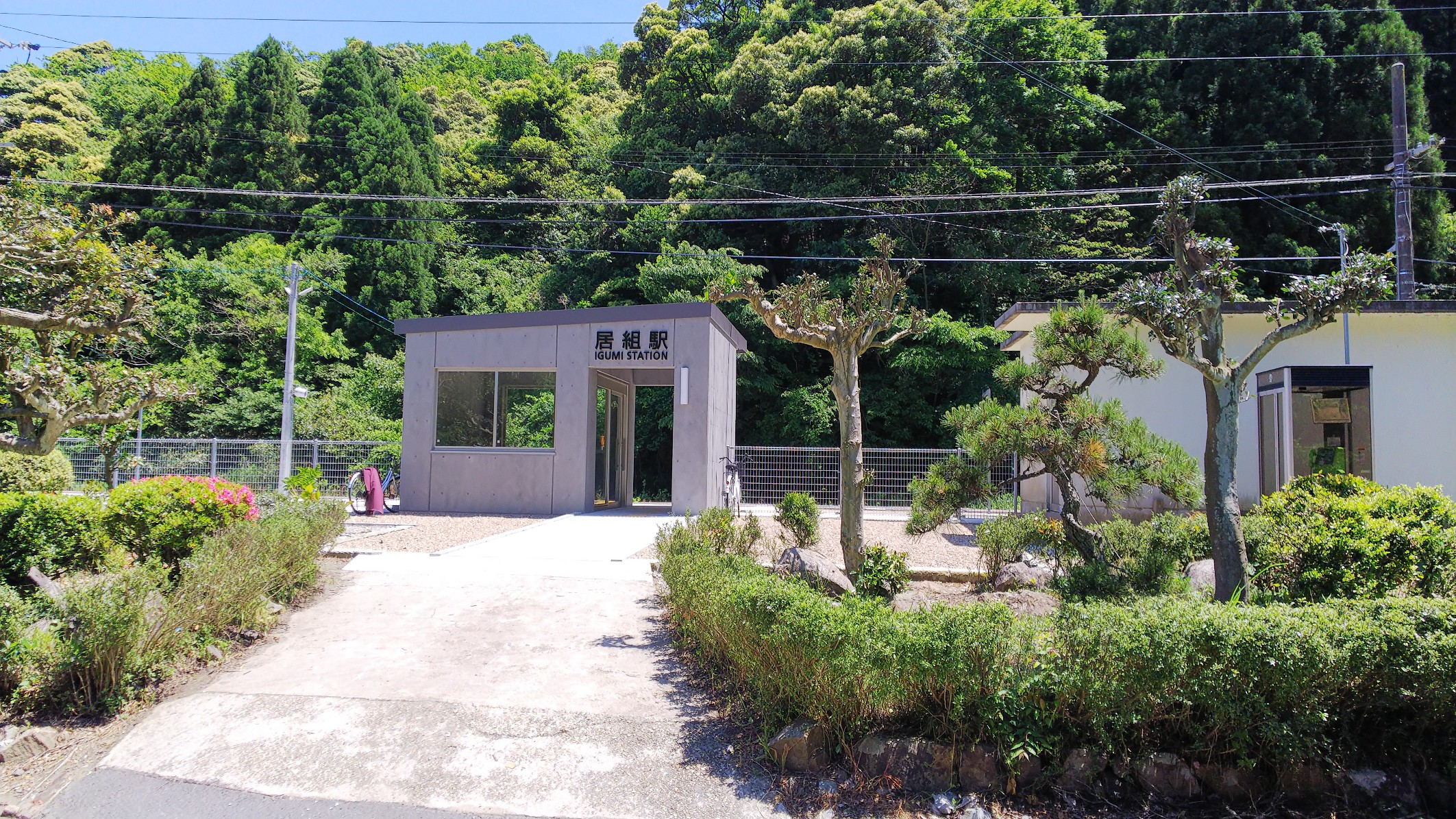
- Igumi Station, May 2019

General information
- Location: Igumi, Shin'onsen-machi, Mikata-gun, Hyōgo-ken 669-6751; Japan
- Coordinates: 35.6070°N 134.3937°E
- Owner: West Japan Railway Company
- Operator: West Japan Railway Company
- Line: San'in Main Line
- Distance: 204.2 km (126.9 miles) from Kyoto
- Platforms: 1 side platform
- Connections: Bus stop

Other information
- Status: Unstaffed
- Website: Official website

History
- Opened: 10 November 1911

Passengers
- FY2016: 11 daily
Location
- Location within Hyōgo Prefecture Location within Japan

Igumi Station (居組駅, Igumi-eki) is a passenger railway station located in the town of Shin'onsen, Mikata District, Hyōgo, Japan, operated by West Japan Railway Company (JR West).

== Lines ==
Igumi Station is served by the San'in Main Line, and is located 204.2 kilometers from the terminus of the line at Kyoto.

== Station layout ==
The station consists of one ground-level side platform serving a single bi-directional track. The station is unattended. The station formerly had a side platform and an island platform connected by a footbridge; however, the island platform, footbridge and old station building were all demolished in 2019.

== Adjacent stations ==
«	Service	»
West Japan Railway Company (JR West) San'in Main Line
Limited Express Hamakaze: Does not stop at this station
Moroyose	Local	Higashihama

== History ==
Igumi Station opened on November 10, 1911.

== Passenger statistics ==
In fiscal 2016, the station was used by an average of 11 passengers daily

== Surrounding area ==
Igumi is a relatively large village facing the Sea of Japan, but the station is about 800m away from the village on the mountain side, and there are almost no private houses around the station.

== See also ==
- List of railway stations in Japan
