= Hamasaka, Hyōgo =

Dissolved municipality in Hyōgo prefecture, Japan

Hamasaka (浜坂町, Hamasaka-chō) was a town located in Mikata District, Hyōgo Prefecture, Japan.

As of 2003, the town had an estimated population of 10,835 and a density of 105.21 persons per km^{2}. The total area was 102.98 km^{2}.

On October 1, 2005, Hamasaka, along with the town of Onsen (also from Mikata District), was merged to create the town of Shin'onsen.
