= Rogier Uitenboogaart =

Dutch paper artist

- Born: Rogier Uitenboogaart; 5 May 1955 (age 69); The Hague, The Netherlands
- Occupation: Japanese Washi Artist
- Partner: Chikako
- Children: Yukina (daughter), Yohei (son)
- Website: Official website

Rogier Uitenboogaart (born 1955) is a Dutch paper artist. After moving from The Netherlands to Japan in 1980, he became known for his skill in making the traditional Japanese paper known as washi.

== Early life and education ==
Uitenboogaart was born in The Hague, the Netherlands in 1955. He studied book preservation and binding in the Netherlands before moved to Japan in 1980.

== Career ==
Uitenboogaart and Japanese architect Kuma Kengo have collaborated on numerous projects. Uitenboogaart works out of a studio in Yusuhara, Kochi prefecture.

In 2014 he appeared in an episode of the TV series Begin Japanology titled Japanophiles: Rogier Uitenboogaart.

== Philosophy ==
Uitenboogaart craft has a strong connection to his immediate surroundings. From an interview with Masako Yamada, from the Public Relations Office of the Government of Japan, Uitenboogaard says, washi "is deeply connected with mountains, rivers and other natural features. When I look at washi I can even feel as if I'm seeing these natural landscapes."

== Types of Washi Produced ==
Uitenboogaart produces many traditional types of washi paper. One signature type is called “Waranshi” which is explained as "a fusion paper made by blending the raw materials for Washi and western paper made from cotton from the Netherlands..."
