= Kōdō Sawaki =

Japanese Sōtō Zen teacher

Kodo Sawaki
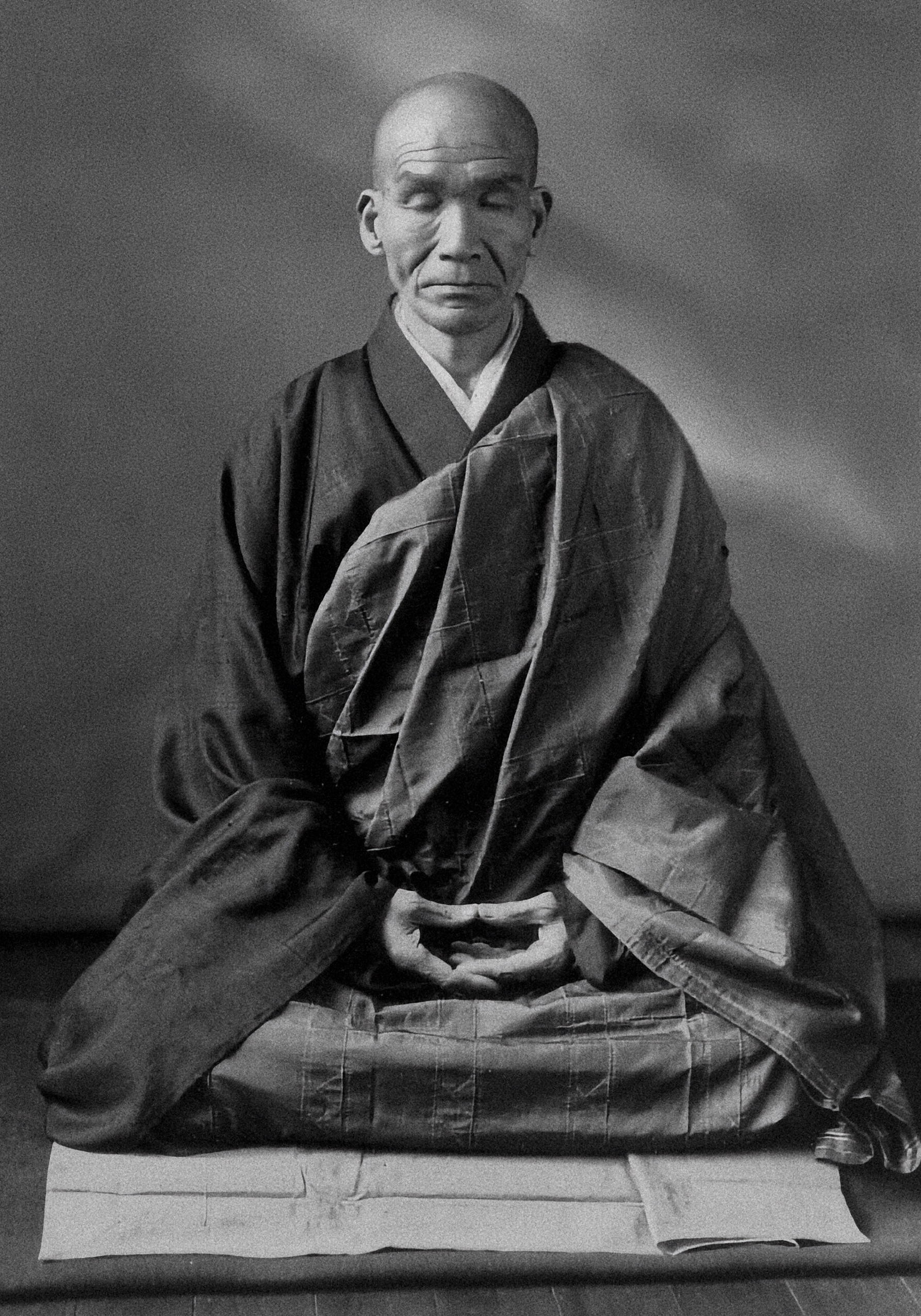
- Title: Rōshi

Personal life
- Born: June 16, 1880 Tsu, Mie, Japan
- Died: December 21, 1965 (aged 85) Antai-ji, Kyoto

Religious life
- Religion: Zen Buddhism
- School: Sōtō

Senior posting
- Successor: Kosho Uchiyama

Kodo Sawaki (沢木 興道, Sawaki Kōdō; June 16, 1880 – December 21, 1965) was a prominent Japanese Sōtō Zen teacher of the 20th century. He is considered to be one of the most significant Zen priests of his time for bringing Zen practice, in particular meditation, into the lives of laypeople and popularizing the ancient tradition of sewing the kesa.

== Biography ==
=== Early life ===
Sawaki was born in Tsu, Mie on June 16, 1880. He was the sixth child but born into a happy and wealthy home. Both his parents died when he was young, his mother when he was four and his father three years later. Sawaki was then adopted by an aunt whose husband soon died. After this, Sawaki was raised by a lantern maker named Bunkichi Sawaki who had eleven wives and used Kodo for labor, turned the home into a gambling parlor at night, and beat him. When he was 9, one of his neighbors died at a brothel while with a much younger prostitute, and upon viewing the scene of the aftermath Sawaki stated it created an intense feeling of emptiness in him, more than his parents' deaths, and he realized things cannot be hidden. Sawaki was described as a tough street kid though he also visited Buddhist Pure Land temples. As a child, he saw a group of chanting monks return to their temple after being out begging and is said to have found peace that contrasted with his difficult upbringing. Sawaki realized there was a world of beauty in addition to the world he knew.

=== Path to Ordination ===
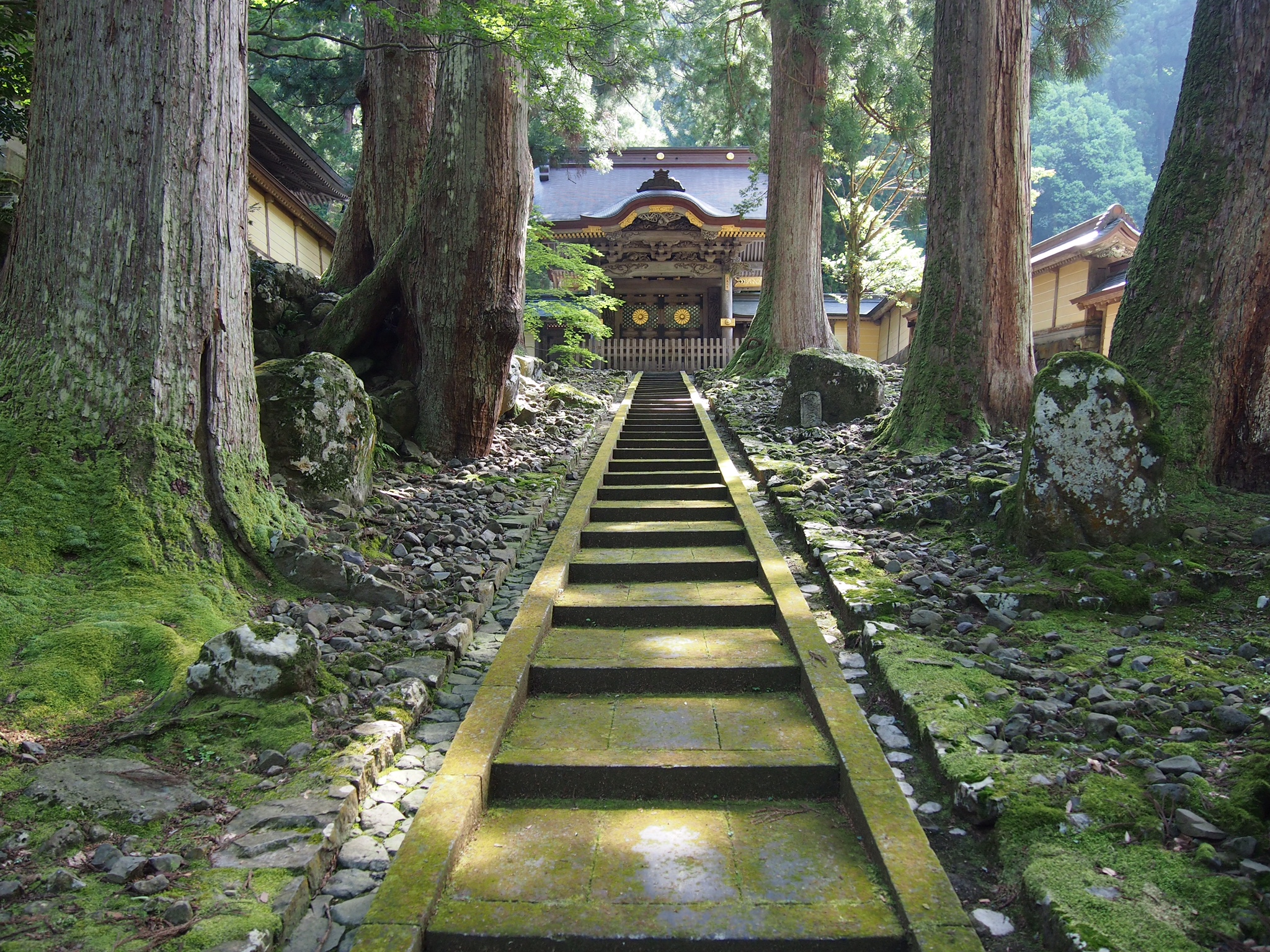
Eiheiji, Fukui prefecture, Japan

When he was 16, he ran away from home to become a monk at Eihei-ji, one of the two head temples of the Sōtō Zen sect. A monk at the entrance tried to turn him away but Sawaki stated he would rather die than return home. At Eihei-ji, Sawaki learned that not all monks were good, having a confrontation with a monk who mistreated him. Eihei-ji is also where Sawaki was first introduced to zazen. Eihei-ji did not ordain monks so Sawaki was instructed to leave and find a temple that could ordain him.

Sawaki left and began a difficult journey to Soshin-ji. Sawaki lacked money so he, in a state of fear, recited the Heart Sutra to a ferry captain as payment and was allowed passage. Sawaki faced cold conditions and became covered in lice. Realizing he would not make it in his current state, Sawaki visited temples and reunited with his sister to receive care. Dirty in appearance, Sawaki was accused of stealing one woman's lost purse while on a boat, with no one believing he was a monk, and was arrested and imprisoned for a month, only being released after a prison chaplain believed him and advocated for him. Sawaki stated he did not see much difference between the prisoners and the prison guards, stating that in Buddhism we are all originally deluded beings.

When he was 18 years old Sawaki arrived at Soshin-ji where he began to learn Buddhist sutras and ceremonies. Sawaki was ordained in 1899 by Koho Sawada. Sawaki became popular, which resulted in some jealousy from another monk who bullied him. During a segaki ceremony making an offering to hungry ghosts, Sawaki fought the bullying monk and was praised by his fellow monks for standing up for himself. Sawaki was asked to read a sutra during a funeral for an impoverished man whose father had died. The man sat naked, having put his only kimono on his father's corpse. Sawaki gave the man his kimono and returned to Soshin-ji where he stole rice and collected his savings to give to the man. He instructed the man to cook the rice, buy tofu, and invite his neighbors for food and he would conduct the funeral rites. Later Sawaki would condemn monks who would perform funerals for the purpose of receiving contributions. After two years of training at Soshin-ji, Sawaki decided to leave, following the way of unsui, to seek additional Zen training. Sawaki traveled to temples before settling at Hosenji at age 20, at which point he was drafted to serve in the Imperial Japanese Army.

=== Wartime ===
Sawaki actively supported and participated in the Japanese war effort during his service in the Russo-Japanese War of 1904–1905. Sawaki stated “Discarding one’s body beneath the military flag is true selflessness. It is in doing this that you immediately become faithful retainers of the emperor and perfect soldiers.” Sawaki was shot through the neck with the bullet splitting his tongue. When he regained consciousness he woke up in a medical tent marked as a patient likely to die. After someone noticed him breathing he was treated and sent to a hospital in Hiroshima then Nagoya. Sawaki was sent to the home of the people who raised him to rest and recover only to discover the woman chained to a chair and Bunkichi gone. Bunkichi had gambled that Kodo would die and, as a father figure, Bunkichi would receive army compensation. Bunkichi gambled on that assumed compensation losing money he did not have. Sawaki felt the need to help them, and visited his brother for money which he gave to Bunkichi.

=== Later life ===
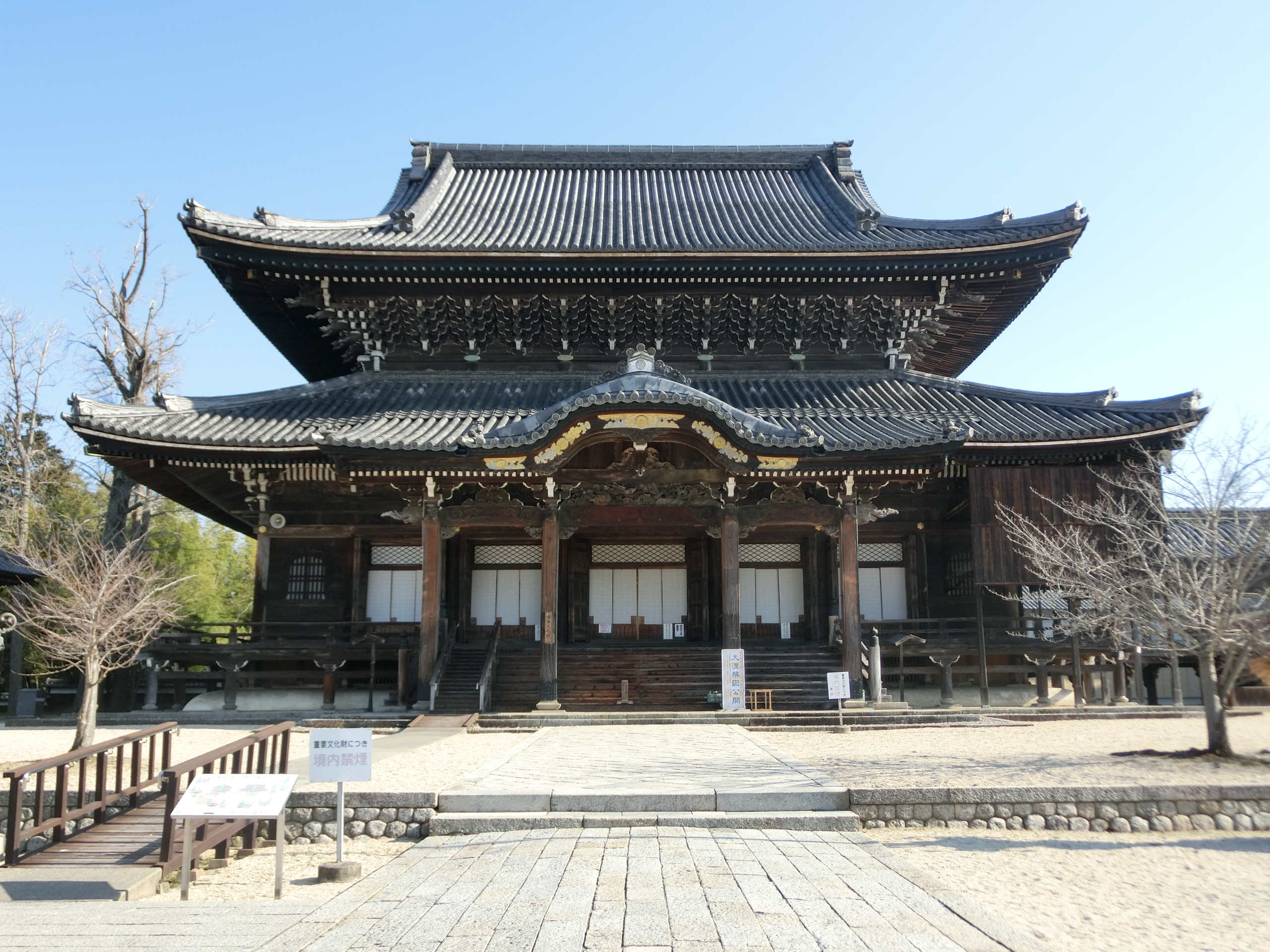
Honzan-Senju-ji Nyoraido

After being discharged in 1906, Sawaki became head student at Soshin-ji. He received dharma transmission later that year from Zenko Sawada. He then studied for two years at the priests training school of Senju-ji, a Jōdo Shinshū temple in the Takada district of Tsu. From there, Sawaki traveled to Hōryū-ji to study Yogacara with Join Saeki. Sawaki then spent a three-month practice period studying Dōgen with Oka Sotan. Sawaki ended up in charge of Daijiji for seven years until the death of Oka Roshi where he taught monks and helped restore the monastery.

At Daijiji, Sawaki would develop his own very direct and occasionally crass teaching style and stated the students at the Fifth High School of Kumamoto were the greatest influences in his life as a Zen practitioner. Sawaki was also given younger people to train, many of whom missed their families and had been sent to the monastery by parents unwilling to care for them Sawaki struggled with these younger students stating he lacked robashin (grandmotherly love). This experience led him to realize he did not just need to teach discipline but also needed to truly sympathize with his students. At Daijiji Sawaki also took on a student named Akiko plagued by spinal caries who later died by Sawaki's side accepting the three refuges. Later Sawaki began his life on Mannichi Mountain in Kumamoto, traveling to give Dharma talks while living at the second home of a Mr. Shibata a member of the prefecture who heard him recite the sutras with Mr. Shibata hoping Sawaki would be a resource for commoners. Sawaki gave out printed texts for free and attracted a diverse audience. Sawaki also praised others in his talks including Sontoku Ninomiya who helped rebuild homes in Sakura Village as a peasant laborer.

Sawaki later became a Zen teacher, and during the 1930s he served as a professor at Komazawa University. In 1949, he took responsibility for Antai-ji, a zen temple in northern Kyoto. Because of his regular travels throughout Japan to teach zen, and against tradition his not becoming a conventional abbot of a home temple, he came to be known as "Homeless Kodo" ("homeless" referring more to his lack of a temple than a residence). Sawaki traveled the country speaking wherever a request was made until two years before his death focused on teaching laypeople. Sawaki died on December 21, 1965, at Antaiji. His last words were "Look at that. Nature is magnificent. In all my life, I have never encountered a person to whom I could have submitted and who I could have admired. But this Takagamine mountain looks upon me form the heights saying: ‘Kodo, Kodo’" He was succeeded by a senior disciple, Kosho Uchiyama.

== Teachings ==
During his teachings Sawaki gave talks on a range of subjects but is known for his rigorous emphasis on zazen (sitting meditation), in particular the practice of shikantaza sitting". He often called Zen "wonderfully useless," discouraging any gaining idea or seeking after special experiences or states of consciousness.

=== Zazen Teachings ===
Sawaki stated that each person practicing zazen, truly forgetting the self, settling into one's position, working at eliminating delusion, will surely succeed. Sawaki taught that each of us should be positioned in "no-self", that duty is fully achieved in that position where no-self exists, and that this is being one with all things. Sawaki thought Buddhism is realized through practice and understood through the body. Therefore, we must practice zazen and have proper control over our muscles. With zazen as the standard, we can train ourselves to have the proper attitude for life. Generally speaking, practice should be the approach to life. He said one never feels that you can catch hold of zazen as you never chase after it and you never run from it and it is nothing to fear.

=== Zazen and Mother Earth ===
Sawaki stated the Buddha gives life sustained through mother earth. During our lives in this body, we are not sustained by our own effort yet we continue moment after moment without any rest. This is what is meant by "the original face". The Buddha continuously gives life to this original face without our effort and therefore the Buddha never rests. In zazen, you eliminate yourself and become mother nature. We meditate on the original storehouse of light within us and not what will be. Since this the way we have been since the beginning, we can become infants. To do zazen is proof of having been given life from mother nature as it is not the regular self but a continuation of the universe and the whole universe becomes you. When one does zazen, the whole universe is doing zazen and the universe is the content of the self. Sawaki taught heaven and earth give including air, water, plants, animals, and humans. All gives to each other. We live within this circle of mutual giving. Whether we are grateful or not, this is a fact.

=== Zazen and Desire ===
Sawaki taught that every cell in the human body has raw ingredients for worldly desires. So the problem is how we handle these desires. Though the flesh body is a burden, it is meaningless to squander it because then you cannot practice zazen and you will not be able to rein in this burden in order to carefully handle it and achieve your highest potential. Though we all have worldly desires, we can eliminate their burdens by the way we deal with them in our hearts.

=== Zazen and Buddha Nature ===
Sawaki stated zazen is becoming a Buddha while you are still a deluded person, as zazen is not the way of the world but the way of the Buddhas and patriarchs, which means zazen is renouncing the world. Sawaki felt that even though people become ordained, their delusions don't disappear, but when they practice zazen, they have the posture of the Buddha and therefore zazen is the Buddha leaving delusions as they are. He taught that one must not ever lose sight of impermanence. If one truly sees impermanence you are a Buddha with each exhale and a Buddha with each inhale. You have everything then and there and no reason to think about preserving in the future. He also saw zazen as an ideal state saying the Buddha is where humans thoughts disappear and birth and death are no more, where likes and dislikes disappear, and whatever is fine which is the ideal of zazen.

=== Other Teachings ===
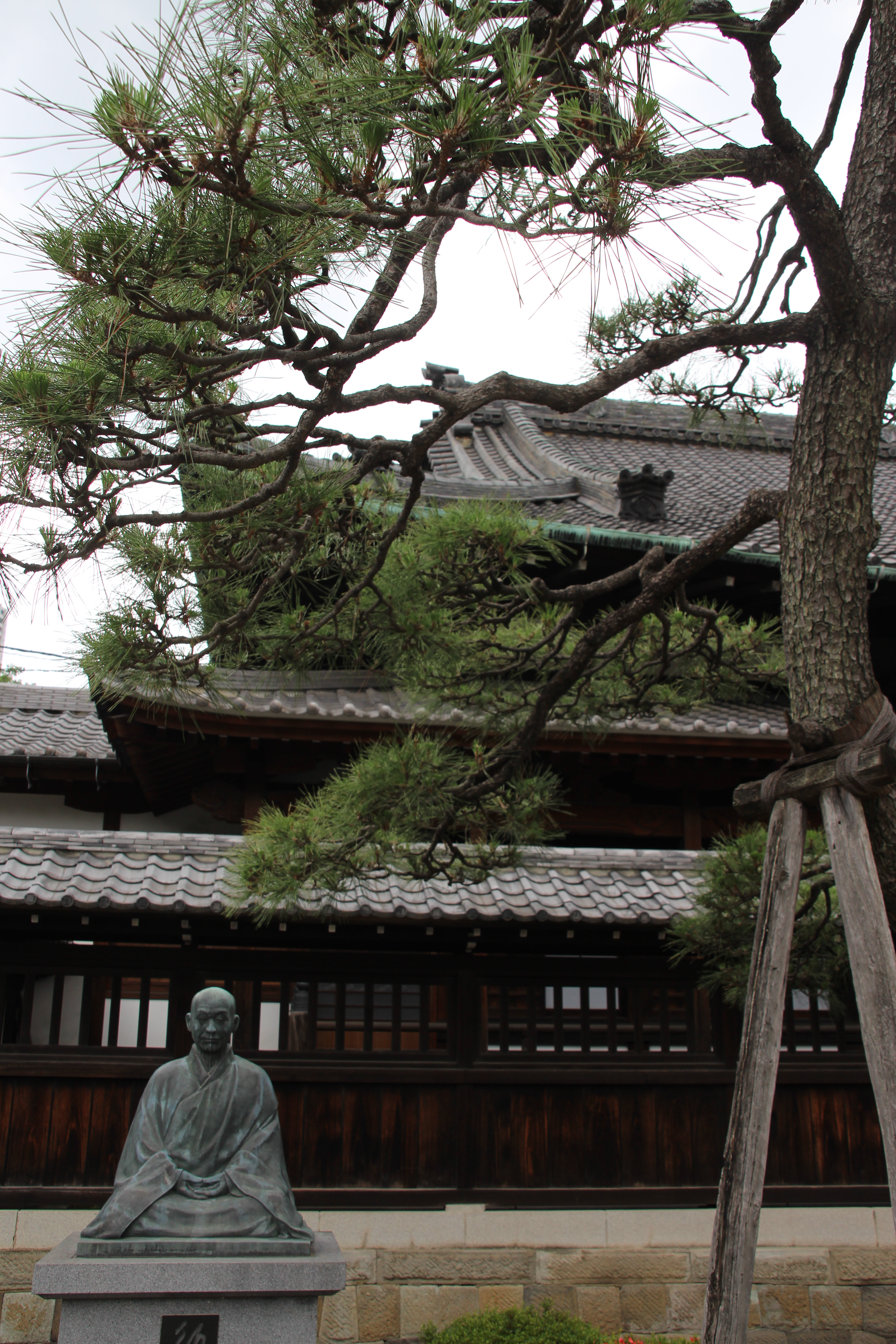
Statue of Sawaki

Sawaki taught that he read that standing out has no benefit and being different from the community is not the way which originally upset him as a priest who in his early days hated to lose. Sawaki saw that people always rush to get ahead of a group. Sawaki stated that the dharma teaches there are demons, hungry ghosts, and beasts and a world of heavenly beings in which one goes back and forth between these worlds of desire but with zazen you cannot be turned around, you just sit. Sawaki offered the poem from Dogen "Without thinking that he protects rice, the scarecrow, in the mountain's small paddy, doesn't exist in vain".

Sawaki stated people reading the same newspaper read different sections each with a different interest. Thus people look at the newspaper in accordance with their discriminating thoughts. When these people view things according to their thinking, the will all see things differently. When the do not see things through their discriminating thinking, they will recognize their commonality. Humans think and think and as a result make mistakes. Sawaki stated everybody is in their own dream and the discrepancies that exist among these dreams are the problem. People are shocked by revolutions and ways but they are struggles within a dream. After one dies, they will view it and realize it was all a dream. In a similar if simpler vein he stated "A horse and a cat once discussed the question, “What is happiness?” They couldn’t reach any agreement.”

As a teacher, Sawaki saw many young people within the education system but he criticized the educational system stating it is stupid to test and grade and give students a number marking what is superior and inferior. The original aim of education was to find a meaning in life but after the Meiji Resolution school became merely a means of finding a good job.

Opposed to expectations of payment, Sawaki stated that the Buddha came back from begging barefoot, washed his feet, ate his meal, and gave a sermon. At that time Sharihotsu keeled beside him and asked him questions. The Buddha did not ask for money but just spoke and because it was free it was respected. Being a monk does not cost anything, and that's pretty good. Sawaki thought "no gain" is the most beautiful aspect of humans and aspiration of the Buddha of the Buddha and patriarchs is to throw away the aspiration of ordinary people.

=== Teachings from "To You" Series ===
Uchiyama Roshi compiled a collection of Sawaki's sayings collection of his sayings, called “To You" that are quintessential of his direct and occasionally somewhat crass style. The full version contains 34 "to you" statements.

==== To you who have just begun brooding over life ====
"In a part of Manchuria, the carts are pulled by huge dogs. The driver hangs a piece of meat in front of the dog’s nose, and the dog runs like crazy to try to get at it. But of course he can’t. He’s only thrown his meat after the cart has finally reached its destination. Then in a single gulp, he swallows it down. It’s exactly the same with people and their paychecks. Until the end of the month they run after the salary hanging in front of their noses. Once the salary is paid, they gulp it down, and they’re already off: running after the next payday. Nobody can see farther than the end of their nose. The question is: why are you straining your forehead so much? If you aren’t careful, you’ll spend your whole life doing nothing besides waiting for your ordinary-person hopes to someday be fulfilled."

To you who wish you could lead a happier life

Rest awhile and everything will be fine. We simply need to take a short break. Being buddha means taking a short break from being a human. Being buddha doesn’t mean working your way up as a human.

“What sort of person stands on the ground where there’s neither coming nor going?” Kyuho answered, “The stone sheep versus the stone tiger: sooner or later they’ll get tired of staring each other in the eyes.” The stone sheep won’t flinch. The stone tiger won’t jump out of hunger. That’s the point—encountering things beyond thinking.

What do we have when we truly have a grip on things as they are? Beyond-thinking [hishiryo]. Beyond-thinking doesn’t allow itself to be thought. No matter if you think so or not: things are simply as they are.

“All things are empty” means there’s nothing we can run into, because nothing is really happening. Nothing is ever happening, no matter what seems to be going on—that’s the natural condition. Illusion means losing this natural condition. Normally we don’t recognize this natural condition. Normally we cover it with something else, so it’s not natural anymore.

The buddhadharma means the natural condition.

To practice the way of Buddha means to completely live out this present moment—which is our whole life—here and now.

To you whose life is about money, money, and more money

Human happiness and unhappiness doesn’t only depend on money. If the balance in your savings account were a measure of your happiness, it would be a simple matter. Yet it really isn’t so.

Don’t be so helpless that you start saying you need money to live. In this world you can lead a fine life without savings.

Some think they’re important because they have money. Others think they’re important because they have “satori” [enlightenment]. But no matter how much you puff up your personal sack of flesh, you won’t make yourself into any- thing besides a devil.

That which doesn’t belong to you fills the entire universe. Where personal thoughts come to an end is where the buddhadharma begins.

== Legacy ==
Sawaki is considered highly influential within Sōtō Zen and repopularized sitting practice in Japan. Sawaki has been criticized by Buddhist contemporaries and modern Buddhists for his support for the violent war effort, though the extent to which he supported violence during war or if his views evolved in later years is debated.

== Lineage ==
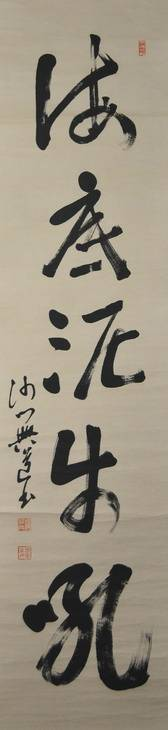
Calligraphy by Kōdō Sawaki. 海底泥牛吼 (Clay ox howls on the floor of the sea)

=== Dharma transmission ===
Though Sawaki ordained many monks and nuns, only five monks and three nuns received Dharma Transmission (Shihō) from Sawaki:

- Shūyū Narita (1914–2004): students in Japan and Europe.
- Kosho Uchiyama (1912–1998): succeeded Sawaki as abbot of Antai-ji.
- Sodō Yokoyama (1907–1980): also called "Kusabue Zenji (Zen master of the grass-flute)".
- Satō Myōshin.
- Kōjun Kishigami (born 1941): lives in Japan; students in Japan, France and Germany.
- Jōshin Kasai (1920–1985): female, active in kesa sewing.
- Kōbun Okamoto (1925-?): female, active in kesa sewing.
- Baikō Fukuda: female, part time tenzô (cook) in Antaiji.

=== Influential students ===
Other influential students of Sawaki who did not receive Dharma transmission from him are:

- Gudo Wafu Nishijima (1919–2014)
- Taisen Deshimaru (1914–1982): went to France in 1967 and lived there for the rest of his life, establishing the Association Zen Internationale.
- Kōbun Chino Otogawa (1938–2002): taught many students over the years in the United States and Europe.

== Bibliography ==
- Sawaki, Kōdō; Uchiyama, Kōshō; Okumura, Shōhaku (2014). The Zen Teaching of Homeless Kodo. Wisdom Publications. ISBN 978-1614290483.
- Sawaki, Kōdō (2014). Commentary on the Song of Awakening. Merwin Asia. ISBN 978-1937385613.
