= Shin'onsen =

Shin'onsen 新温泉町
- Town
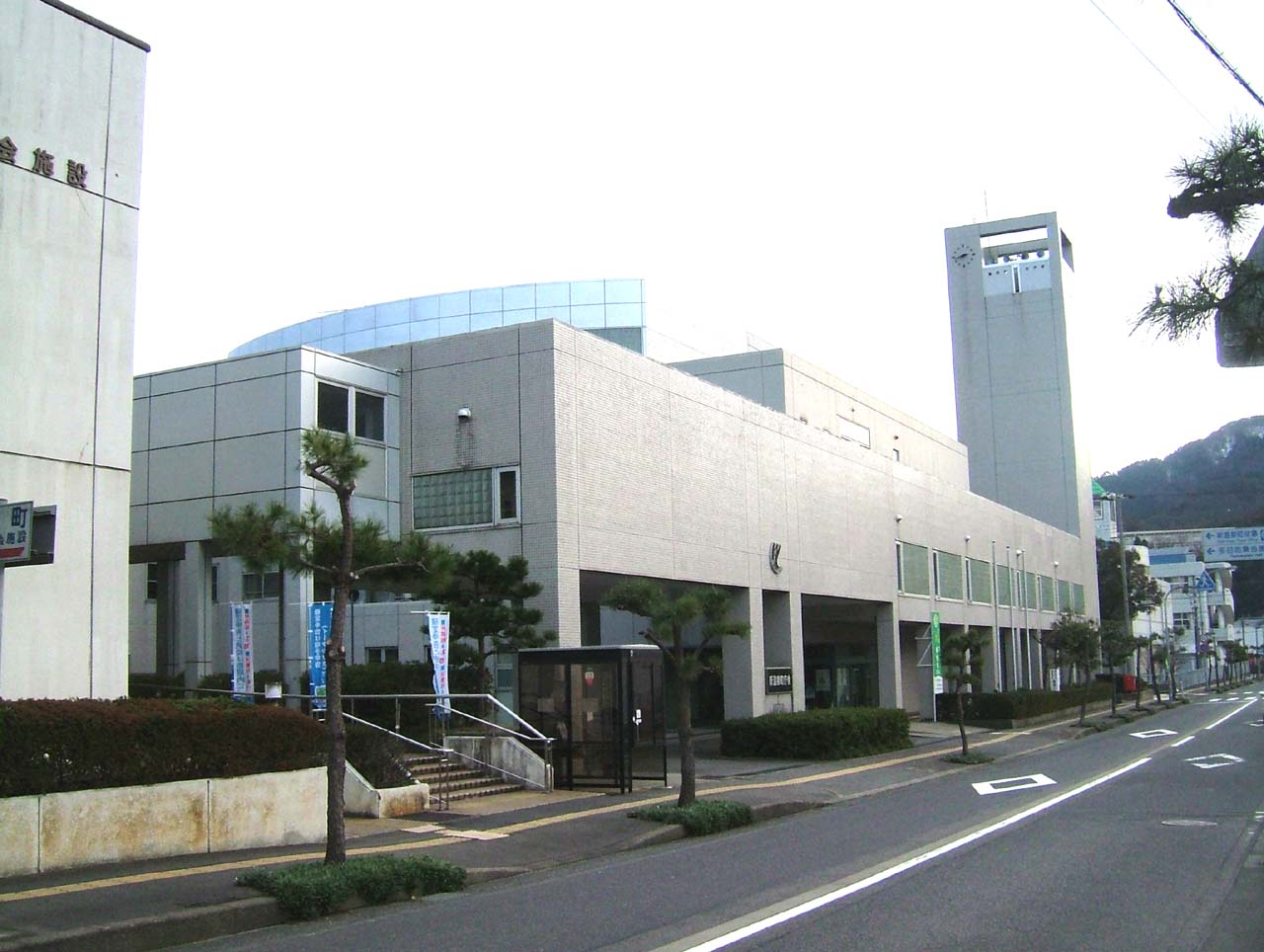
- Shin'onsen Town Office

- Flag Chapter

- Location of Shin'onsen in Hyōgo Prefecture

- Location in Japan
- Coordinates: 35°37′25″N 134°26′56″E
- Country: Japan
- Region: Kansai
- Prefecture: Hyōgo
- District: Mikata

Government
  - Mayor: Ginzo Nishimura

Area
  - Total: 241.01 km^{2} (93.05 sq mi)

Population (April 1, 2021)
  - Total: 12,814
  - Density: 53.168/km^{2} (137.70/sq mi)
- Time zone: UTC+09:00 (JST)
- City hall address: 2673-1 Hamasaka, Shin-onsen-cho, Mikata-gun, Hyogo-ken 〒669-6792
- Website: Official website
- Symbols
- Bird: Iwatsubame (Delichon urbica), uguisu (Horornis diphone)
- Flower: Sakura (cherry blossom), sasayuri (Lilium japonicum)
- Tree: Kuromatsu (Pinus thunbergii), momiji (Acer palmatum)

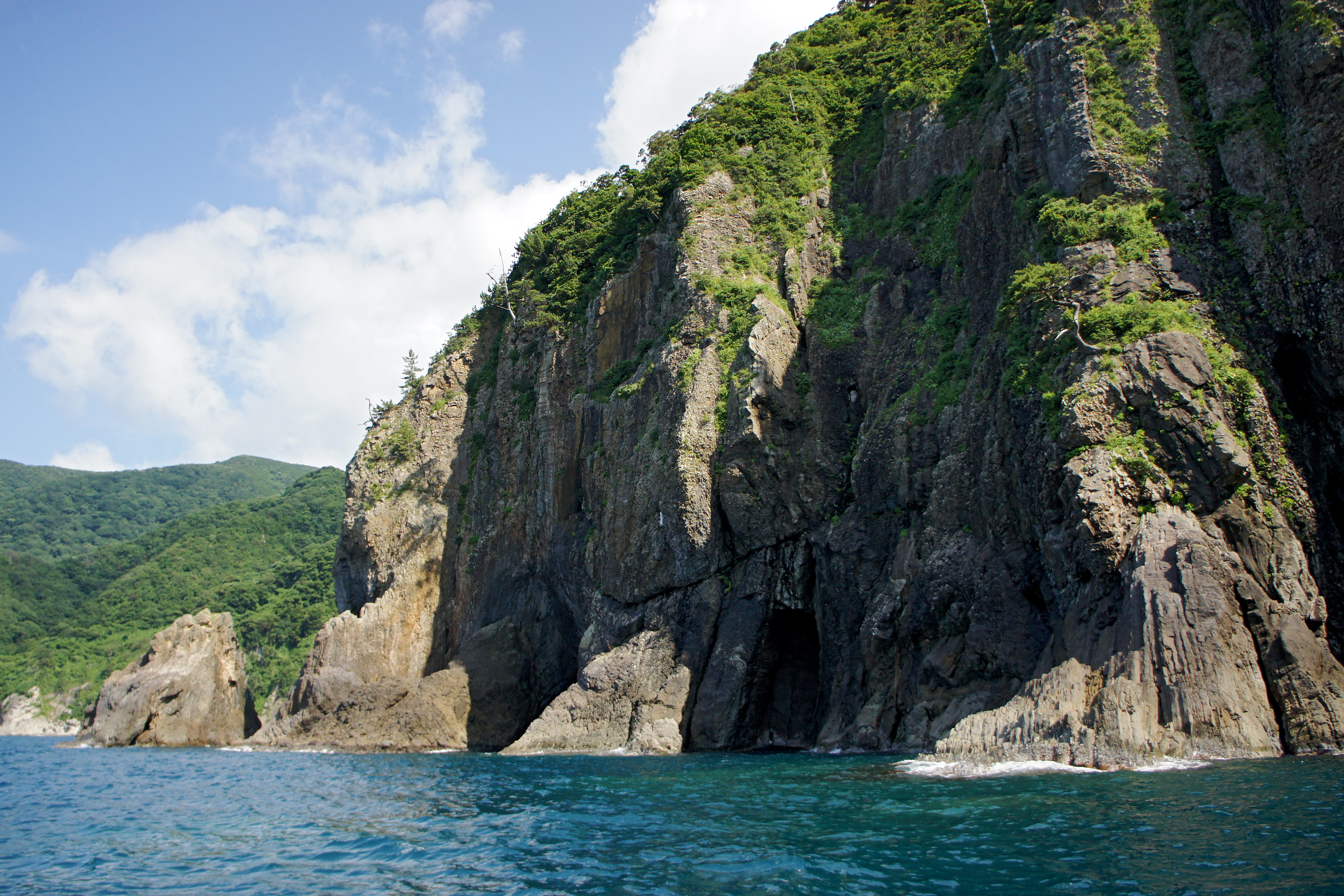
Mihonoura Coast

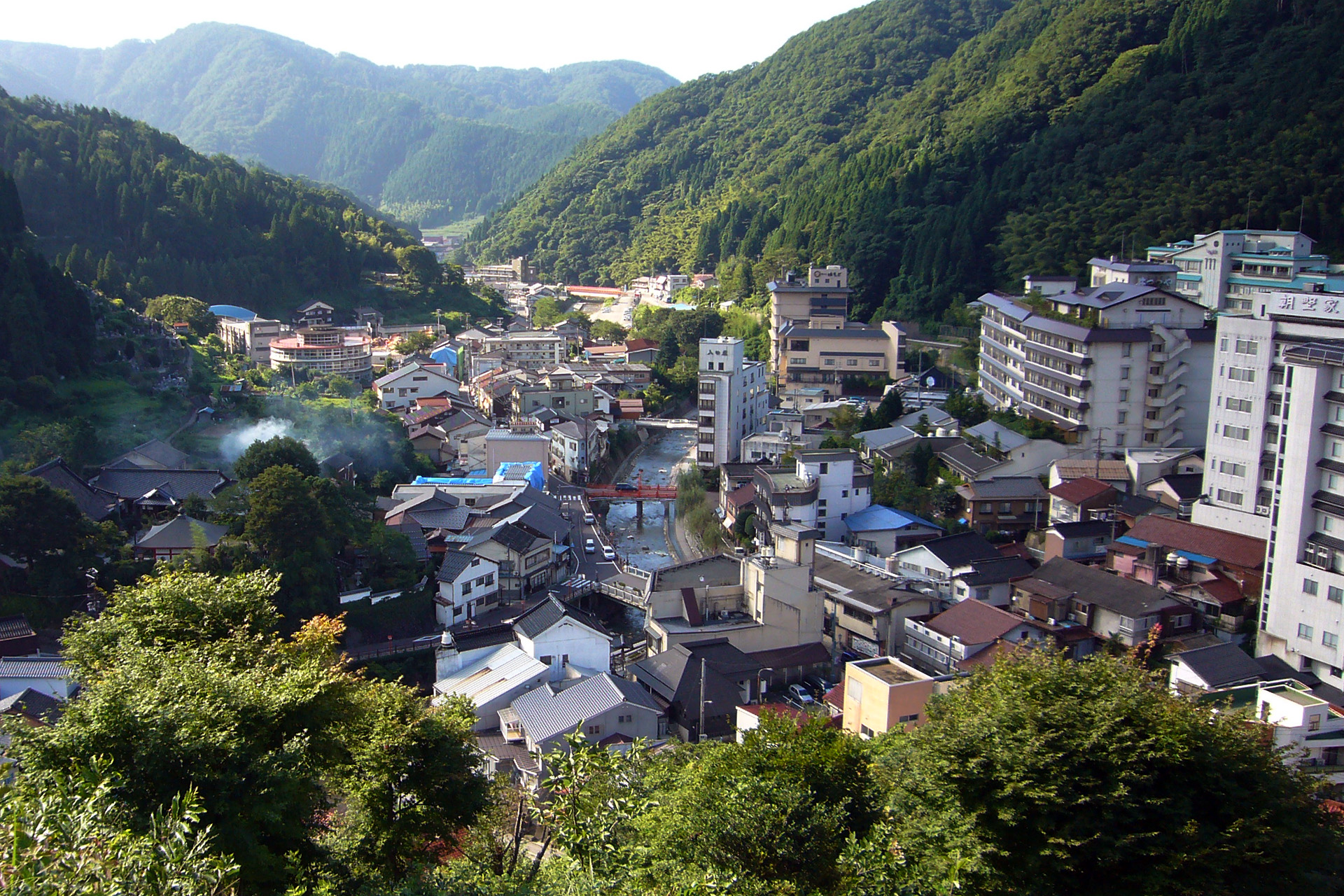
Yumura Onsen

Shin'onsen (新温泉町, Shin'onsen-chō) is a town located in Mikata District, Hyōgo Prefecture, Japan. As of 1 April 2022, the town had an estimated population of 12,814 in 4873 households and a population density of 53 persons per km^{2}. The total area of the town is 241.01 square kilometres (93.05 sq mi).

== Geography ==
Shin'onsen is located in the north westernmost part of Hyōgo Prefecture and the Kinki region. It borders Tottori Prefecture in the west and faces the Sea of Japan in the north. It lies entirely within the San'in Kaigan Geopark. In addition, the mountainous area in the south is within the borders of the Hyōnosen-Ushiroyama-Nagisan Quasi-National Park and the Tajima Mountain Prefectural Natural Park. The Tajima Mihonoura coast is designated as a National Places of Scenic Beauty and a Natural Monument. The town spreads around the coast and rivers of the Kishida River system, and in the mountainous area in the south, there is Yumura Onsen. The area is part of the snow country and is characterized by heavy accumulations of snow in winter.

=== Neighbouring municipalities ===
Hyōgo Prefecture

- Kami

Tottori Prefecture

- Iwami
- Tottori
- Wakasa

=== Climate ===
Shin'onsen has a Humid subtropical climate (Köppen Cfa) characterized by warm summers and cold winters with heavy snowfall. The average annual temperature in Shin'onsen is 12.2 °C. The average annual rainfall is 1841 mm with September as the wettest month. The temperatures are highest on average in August, at around 24.0 °C, and lowest in January, at around 0.8 °C.

== Demographics ==
Per Japanese census data, the population of Shin'onsen peaked in the 1950s, and has been declining since.

Historical population
Year	Pop.	±%
1920	26,952	—
1930	25,937	−3.8%
1940	25,560	−1.5%
1950	29,788	+16.5%
1960	27,701	−7.0%
1970	22,961	−17.1%
1980	21,514	−6.3%
1990	20,226	−6.0%
2000	18,601	−8.0%
2010	16,014	−13.9%

== History ==
The area of the modern town of Shin'onsen was within ancient Tajima Province, and corresponds almost directly to the area of ancient Futakata District. In the Edo Period, it was divided between the Toyooka Domain and territory under direct administration of the Tokugawa shogunate (tenryo). Following the Meiji restoration, the villages of Onsen and Nishihama and were established within Mikata District with the creation of the modern municipalities system on April 1, 1889. On December 11, 1891, Nishihama was raised to town status and renamed Hamasaka. On October 1, 2005, Onsen and Hamasaka merged to form the town of Shin'onsen.

== Government ==
Shin'onsen has a mayor-council form of government with a directly elected mayor and a unicameral town council of 16 members. Shin'onsen, together with the town of Kami contributes one member to the Hyogo Prefectural Assembly. In terms of national politics, the town is part of Hyōgo 5th district of the lower house of the Diet of Japan.

== Economy ==
Shin'onsen has a mixed economy of commercial fishing, agriculture and tourism. The town is known for its hot spring resorts and also for the production of "Tajima beef".

== Education ==
Shin'onsen has six public elementary schools and two public middle schools operated by the town government and one public high school operated by the Hyōgo Prefectural Department of Education.

== Transportation ==
=== Railway ===
JR West – San'in Main Line

- Kutani - Hamasaka - Moroyose - Igumi

=== Highway ===
- National Route 9
- National Route 178

== Local attractions ==
- Antai-ji Zen monastery
- San'in Kaigan Geopark
- Yumura Onsen (Hyogo)
