= Harold Meij =

Dutch businessman (born 1963)

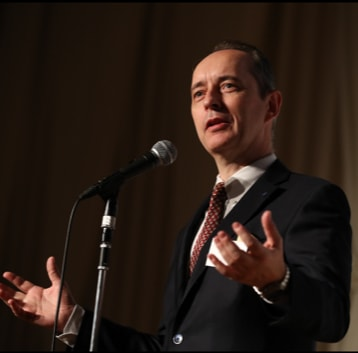
- Meij in October 2016
- Born: 4 December 1963 (age 62); Netherlands
- Education: Bucknell University; New York University
- Occupation: businessman
- Known for: Former President of New Japan Pro-Wrestling

Harold George Meij (born 4 December 1963) is a Dutch businessman. He was the president of New Japan Pro-Wrestling (NJPW) from May 2018 until October 2020.

== Early life and education ==
He came to Japan as a young child due to his father's work not speaking any English or Japanese, but eventually learned both. Born 1963 in the Netherlands, Meij came to Japan in his childhood, and has lived in Japan, Indonesia and the US in his youth. He graduated from Bucknell University and later attended New York University.

== Career ==
In 1987 he joined Heineken Japan, then moved to Unilever Japan, Sunstar, and in 2006 was Senior Vice President of Coca-Cola Japan until joining Tomy in 2014, where he became the Chief Operating Officer, and in 2015 he became the president and CEO, thereby becoming one of the first foreign nationals to lead a first-section listed Japanese company. Meij successfully turned the loss making company around, and its latest financial results is showing greatly improved profitability (year ending March 2017), and their stock has more than quadrupled. He introduced innovative new ideas such as placing "Gacha" toy capsule machines at airports, initiated numerous collaboration and licensing projects with other companies, introduced numerous toy lines based on original animation, comic and film content, and worked on improving brand strength. Known for his marketing and promotional savviness, Meij has used his marketing and management base built over time working at multinational companies such as Heineken, Unilever and Coca-Cola with success to a Japanese company. Known to be fluent in Japanese, the Nikkei even went so far as to say he had the "Steve Jobs Effect" implementing over "100 innovations", and is known to be very approachable even dressing up at Halloween events. He is a Japanese history buff and loves professional wrestling.

In 2014 he was a key speaker at the Yomiuri International Forum to discuss "the world economy and Japan's ability to earn".

In May 2018 it was announced that New Japan Pro-Wrestling (NJPW) appointed Meij as their new President of the company, becoming the first non-Japanese president of NJPW.

Meij is fluent in English, Dutch, and Japanese, among others, and in December 2019 published his first book in Japanese. In 2020 he was featured in NHK's "The Human" and NHK's Japanology Plus. The Tokyo Metropolitan Government also used him is their "Tokyo, My City" campaign.

In December 2019 he was awarded the "45th Global Award" by the Japanese Economic Forum, and in September 2020 won the Forbes Japan 2020 Sports Award . On September 29, 2020, New Japan Pro-Wrestling announced that Meij was stepping down from his role as CEO/President on October 23 after having attained its highest sales and profit level in the company's history.

Meij currently serves as a director for Earth Pharmaceuticals, Kewpie, and Panasonic. He is also an advisor at Sanrio, and is a regular news commentator on the nationally televised "N Suta" news program, broadcast daily on TBS.
