= Antai-ji =

Buddhist temple of the Sōtō school of Zen Buddhism

Antai-ji 安泰寺
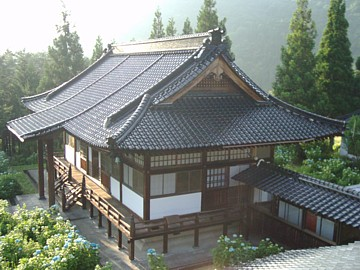
- Main Hall

Religion
- Affiliation: Sōtō
- Leadership: Nakamura Ekō

Location
- Location: 62 Kutoyama, Shin'onsen-chō, Mikata District, Hyōgo Prefecture
- Country: Japan
- Interactive map of Antai-ji 安泰寺
- Coordinates: 35°35′48″N 134°34′33″E

Architecture
- Founder: Oka Sōtan
- Completed: 1921; 1976 (relocation)

Website
- Antai-ji homepage

Antai-ji (安泰寺) is a Buddhist temple that belongs to the Sōtō school of Zen Buddhism. It is located in the town of Shin'onsen, Mikata District, in northern Hyōgo Prefecture, Japan, where it sits on about 50 hectares of land in the mountains, close to a national park on the Sea of Japan. It accepts visitors in the summer months, but is inaccessible during the winter due to heavy snow.

== Kyoto ==
Antai-ji was founded in 1921 by Oka Sotan as a monastery for scholars to study the Shōbōgenzō. It was located in the Gentaku area of northern Kyoto and many leading scholars studied there. Vacated during World War II, Kōdō Sawaki became its fifth abbot in 1949 and made it a place for Zazen. However, because Sawaki was almost constantly on the move, most of the temple's responsibilities fell to his student, Kōshō Uchiyama. Sawaki did not actually reside in the temple until 1962 when his legs became too weak to travel. With Sawaki's death in 1965, Uchiyama became the sixth abbot. During the late 1960s, the small temple became well known in the Zen community both in Japan and abroad for its devoted practice of zazen and formal begging, or takuhatsu. It was unusual in Japan at the time to be supporting itself without income from parishioner families. Instead of performing ceremonies such as funerals to make money, Antai-ji relied completely on donations from lay practitioners and begging. During this time, Uchiyama took on several students who would later become prominent in their own right, such as Shohaku Okumura and Eishin Ikeda.

The increase of visitors and the many new houses being built around the temple created much noise, which made it difficult for the practice of Zazen to continue at the Kyoto location. Therefore, the following abbot, Watanabe Koho (1942–2016), decided to move Antai-ji to its present location in northern Hyōgo. The temple was later demolished, and all that remains of the original Antai-ji is a fenced-off stone under a maple tree that used to be part of the temple garden just outside the abbot's room. It contains a memorial to Sawaki Kodo. A Jehovah's Witness church now stands approximately in its former location.

== Northern Hyōgo ==
Together with the quietude of the mountains, the seventh abbot Kōhō Watanabe sought a new lifestyle that would bring Zen back to self-sufficiency when he moved Antai-ji to its present location. The eighth abbot Shinyu Miyaura (1948–2002) protected this quiet life of Zazen while putting the ideal of a self-sufficient monastery into practice, until his sudden death in the snow in February 2002. His disciple, the German monk Muho Noelke (b. 1968), continued as the ninth abbot until 2020. He was succeeded by Nakamura Eko, his Japanese Dharma heir. A documentary film about the monastery entitled "Zen for Nothing", directed by Werner Penzel and starring Sabine Timoteo, premiered at the Solothurn film festival in 2016.

== Antaiji’s abbots and abbesses ==
- Founding abbot: Oka Sōtan
- Second abbot: Odagaki Zuirin
- Third abbot: Kishizawa Ian
- Fourth abbot: Etō Sokuō
- Fifth abbot: Sawaki Kōdō
- Sixth abbot: Uchiyama Kōshō
- Seventh abbot: Watanabe Kōhō
- Eighth abbot: Miyaura Shinyū
- Ninth abbot: Muhō Nölke
- Tenth abbess: Nakamura Ekō

== Bibliography ==
- Kōshō Uchiyama, Nakiwarai no Takuhatsu, Laughter Through the Tears: a life of mendicant begging in Japan
- Kosho Uchiyama, Opening the Hand of Thought
- Arthur Braverman, Living and Dying in Zazen: Five Zen Masters of Modern Japan
