= Philip Harper (brewer) =

British-born sake brewer in Japan (born 1966)

- Born: 1966 (age 59–60); Birmingham, United Kingdom
- Education: Oxford University
- Known for: Japan's first foreign-born toji

Philip Harper (1966) is a British-born sake brewer in Japan. He is the first immigrant to have earned the title tōji (Kanji: 杜氏 Hiragana: とうじ) or master sake brewer. He has worked for a variety of sake breweries since 1991. His hope is to broaden the market of Japanese sake - bringing its taste to other parts of Asia, Europe, and North America - and to revive sake as the national, cultural drink of Japan. Harper is the author of two books on sake: The Insider's Guide to Sake (Kodansha International, 1998, ISBN 978-4-7700-2076-5), and The Book of Sake: A Connoisseurs Guide (Kodansha International, 2006, ISBN 978-4-7700-2998-0). He is also featured in a chapter of Michael Booth's 2009 travel book Sushi and Beyond: What the Japanese Know About Cooking.

== Early life and career ==
Philip Harper was born in 1966 in Birmingham and was raised in Cornwall, England, United Kingdom. In 1988, Harper earned a bachelor's degree in English Literature at Oxford University. After graduation, he moved to Osaka, Japan to participate in the Japan Exchange and Teaching Programme (JET) where he taught English in public junior and high schools for two years. Harper, already a fan of European alcohol, was introduced to Japanese sake by his teaching colleagues at a party. He then joined a sake drinking club and frequented taverns in the Osaka area.

After completing his two-year contract with the JET Programme, Harper opted to stay in Japan while working days at an English-language conversation school and nights at a local tavern. In 1991 he was introduced to Ume no Yado, a traditional Japanese sake brewery in a rural town within Nara Prefecture. There Harper worked as a general laborer. He spent his first year milling, machine-polishing, and bagging brown rice. He learned how to steam the rice in his second year. By his third year, he was put in charge of cultivating koji mold which allows the rice to ferment into sake. During the next ten years, Harper would spend every day during the sake brewing season - October through April - working at Ume no Yado. The owner of the brewery enrolled Harper in sake brewing classes and gave him material to study to improve his sake-making knowledge. Harper married a Japanese woman shortly after he began his work at the brewery. His marriage ceremony was his only day off during his ten-year employment at Ume no Yado.

Harper published his first book in 1998 entitled The Insider's Guide to Sake. The book drew on his years of experience in consuming and making sake. The small book, which by 2008 had sold over 20,000 copies, contains information about various types of sake including nigori, dai-ginjo, ginjo, and hon-jouzo. The book is targeted at novice-level overseas enjoyers of sake and thus contains many pictures and labels of the various drinks.

== Becoming a Toji ==
In 2001, Harper took and passed the Nanbu Brewer's Guild Exam thus earning him the title of toji or master sake brewer. This title has also earned him a place in Japanese history as Harper is the first non-Japanese person to have earned the prestigious title. Also in 2001, Harper left Ume no Yado and began working at Daimon Brewery. Over the ensuing years, Harper worked at various breweries in Ibaraki, Osaka, and Kyoto.

From his experience working in Japanese sake breweries, Harper realized that sake needed to reach a wider audience in order to survive the modern world of liquor enthusiasts. To that end, he published his second book in 2006 entitled The Book of Sake: A Connoisseurs Guide with the intended audience being both national and international sake drinkers. This book, much like the one written before it, gives a guide to the many varieties and flavors of traditional Japanese sake but is aimed at a more refined audience than the previous work.

== Current career ==
In 2008, Kinoshita-Shuzou Brewery's master brewer died after 45 years of faithful service. The owner considered closing the brewery until Harper was recommended, and then hired, as a replacement. Harper used his expertise in brewing to create his own brand of sake for the brewery. He named it Fukubukuro after the gift bags sold during Japanese New-Years.

By 2009, Harper had received many awards both in Japan and the U.S. for his excellent brands of sake. Harper continues to brew sake at Kinoshita-Shuzou, hoping to spread the taste of the traditional Japanese drink throughout the world and revive the brew in its homeland.
