= Ojiro =

Area in Kami, Hyōgo, Japan

Coordinates: 35.455°N 134.535°E

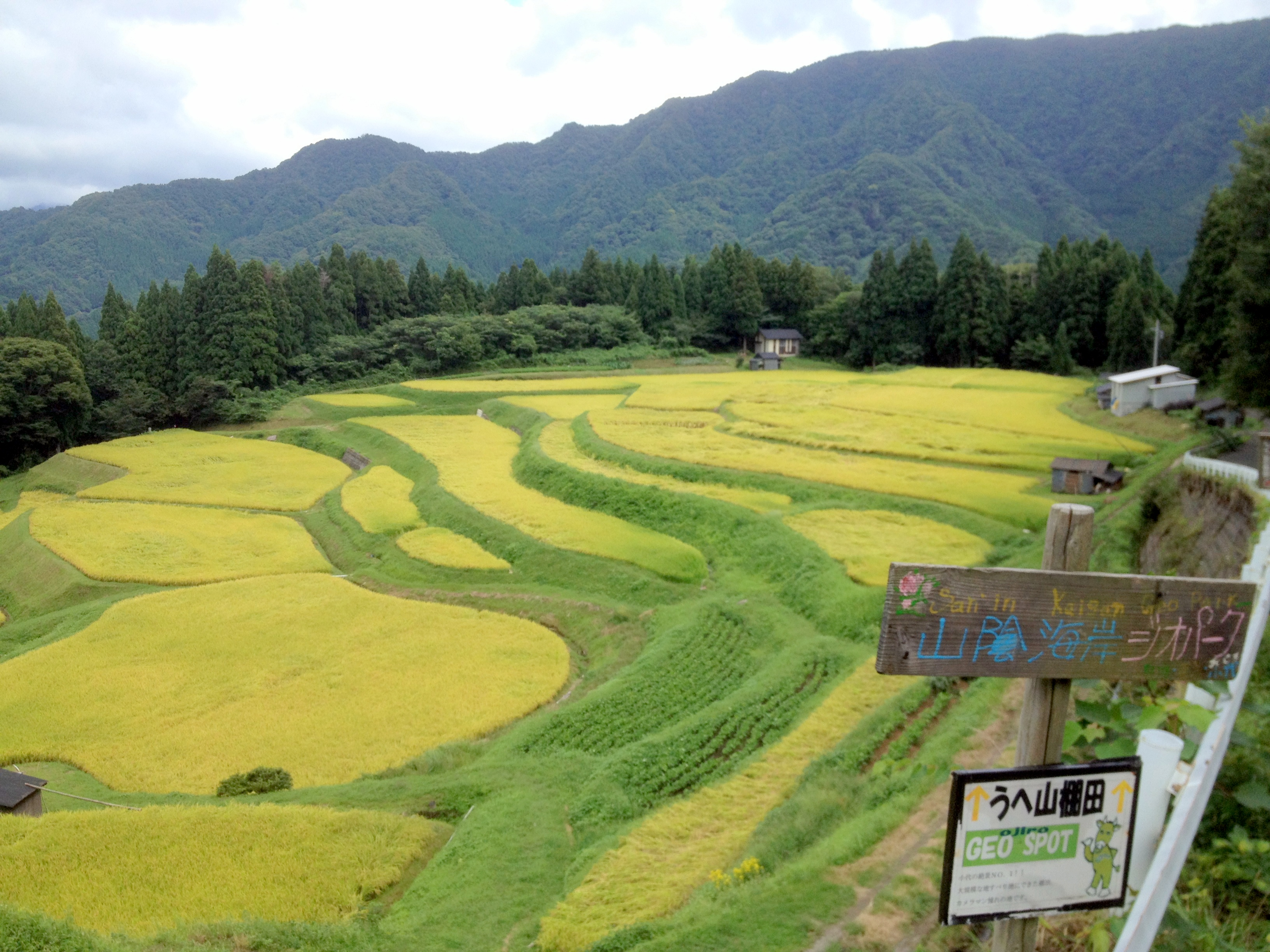
Rice Terraces of Ueyama in Ojiro

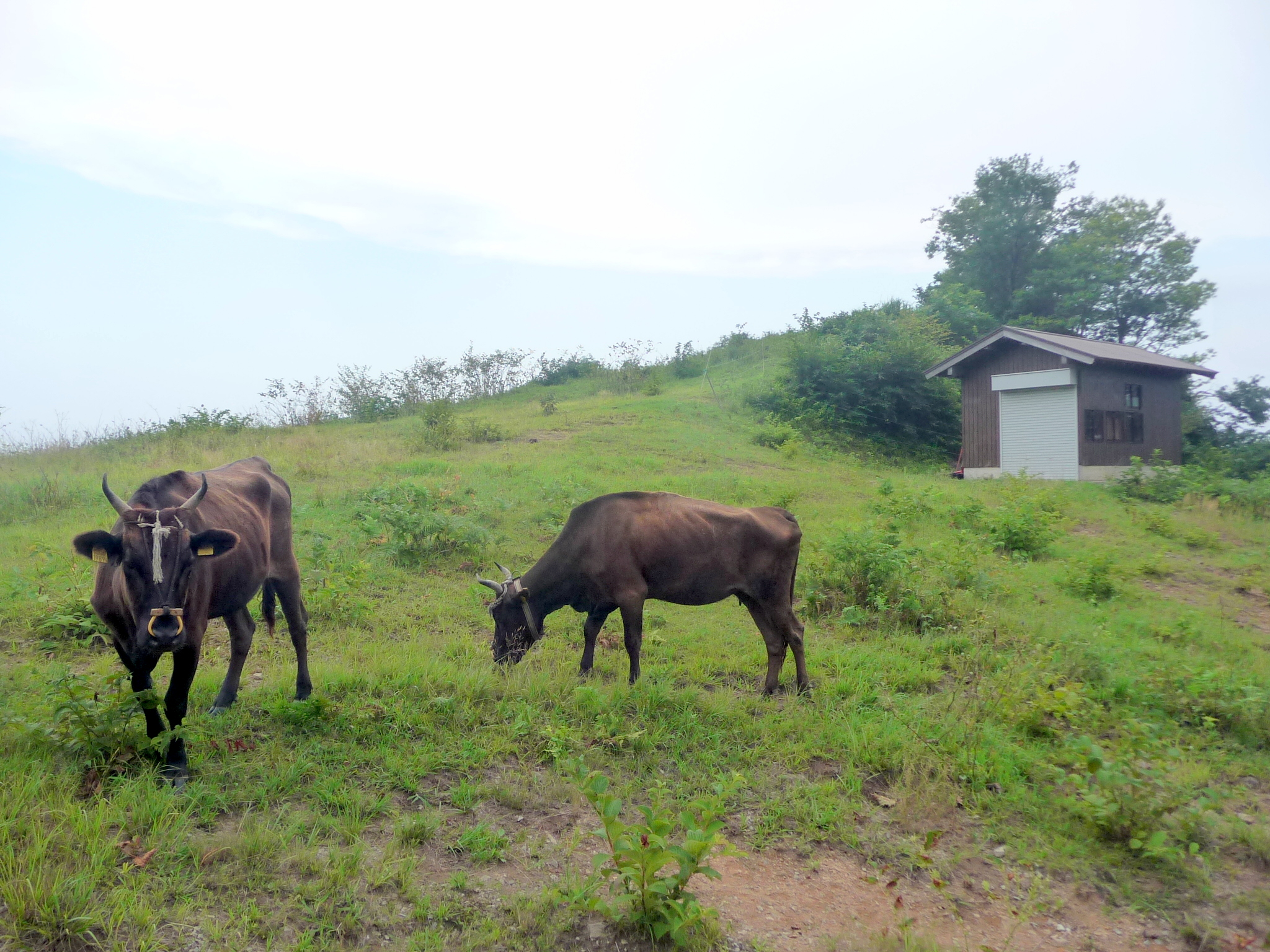
Tajima Cattle in Ojiro

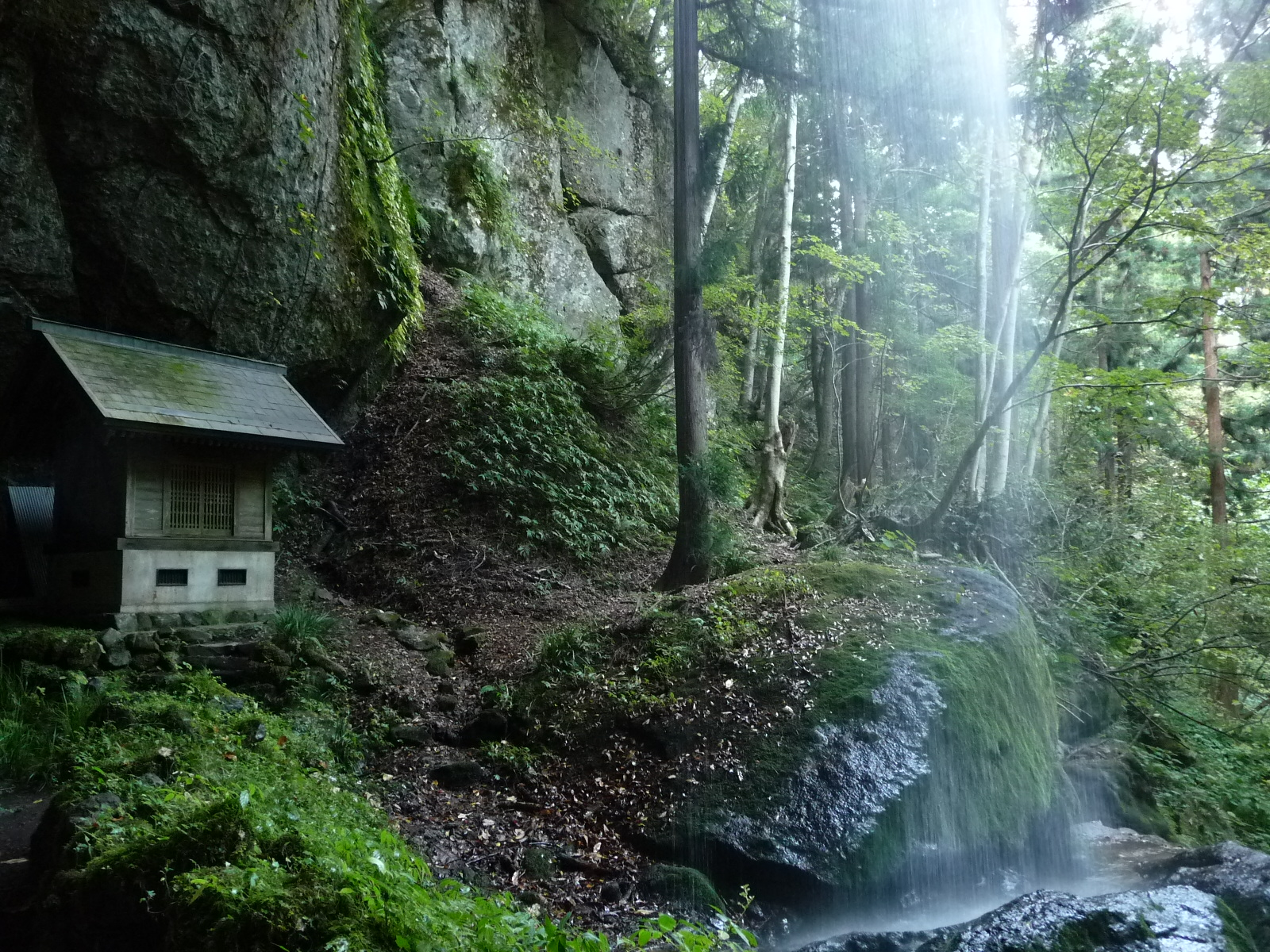
Yoshitaki Waterfalls

Ojiro (小代) is an area located in Kami Town, Mikata District, Hyōgo Prefecture, Japan.

As of 2012, the area has an estimated population of 2,200. The total area is 66.16 km^{2}.

Ojiro is mostly a mountainous area and prides itself as the homeland of Wagyu cattle. Ojiro is designated as one of The Most Beautiful Villages in Japan, and is the birthplace of Tajiri-go, a Tajima cattle who is the ancestor of more than 99.9% of Japanese Black wagyu.

Ojiro lies entirely within the San'in Kaigan Global Geopark.

The area of Ojiro was a town of Mikata. On 1 April 2005, town of Mikata, along with the town of Kasumi, and the town of Muraoka, was merged to create the town of Kami. At that time the portion of Kami that was Mikata renamed as Ojiro-ku (小代区), or Ojiro Ward, because some residents requested to use the traditional place name "Ojiro".

== Attractions ==
- Amagasaki City Mikata Highland Outdoor Learning Center
- Ancient Times Experience Forest (小代古代体験の森)
- Kusube Valley (久須部渓谷)
  - Kaname no taki Falls
  - Sandan no taki Falls
- Mikata Snow Park (ミカタスノーパーク)
- Niiyahattandaki Falls
- Ojiro Health Park (ground golf course)
- Ojiro Shrine
- Ojiro Ski Place (おじろスキー場)
- Ojiron Onsen and Spa (おじろん)
- Tajima Cattle
- Rice Terraces of Ueyama (うへ山の棚田): 100 Best Rice Terraces of Japan
- Yoshitaki Camping Park
- Yoshitaki Waterfalls (吉滝)

== Annual events ==
- February: Mikata Highland Snow Festival
- May: Rhododendron Park Festival
- May: Ojiro Valley Festival
- June: Mikata ZANKOKU (Cruel) Marathon (みかた残酷マラソン全国大会)
- August: Furusato Ojiro Summer Festival
- August: Bon dances in each settlements
- September: Ojiro Sports Festival
- October: Autumn festivals in each settlements
- November: "The Most Beautiful Village in Japan" Ojiro Festival

== Transportation ==
=== Bus ===
Akioka Line operated by Zentan Bus company from Yōka Station. It spends about 1 hour.

=== Major roads ===
- Route 482
