= Kasumi, Hyōgo =

Dissolved municipality in Kinosaki district, Hyōgo prefecture, Japan

Kasumi (香住町, Kasumi-chō) was a town located in Kinosaki District, Hyōgo, Japan.

As of 2003, the town had an estimated population of 13,519 and a density of 98.49 persons per km^{2}. The total area was 137.26 km^{2}.

On April 1, 2005, Kasumi, along with the towns of Mikata and Muraoka (both from Mikata District), was merged to create the town of Kami (in Mikata District), and no longer exists as an independent municipality. The portion of Kami that was Kasumi is now known as Kasumi-ku, Kasumi Ward.

== Geography ==
=== Climate ===
Climate data for Kasumi (1991−2020 normals, extremes 1976−present)
Month	Jan	Feb	Mar	Apr	May	Jun	Jul	Aug	Sep	Oct	Nov	Dec	Year
Record high °C (°F)	19.5 (67.1)	21.5 (70.7)	27.1 (80.8)	32.6 (90.7)	32.3 (90.1)	36.1 (97.0)	37.1 (98.8)	38.0 (100.4)	36.4 (97.5)	31.6 (88.9)	25.6 (78.1)	23.8 (74.8)	38.0 (100.4)
Mean daily maximum °C (°F)	7.8 (46.0)	8.4 (47.1)	11.7 (53.1)	17.1 (62.8)	21.9 (71.4)	24.6 (76.3)	28.8 (83.8)	30.3 (86.5)	26.3 (79.3)	21.3 (70.3)	16.1 (61.0)	10.7 (51.3)	18.8 (65.7)
Daily mean °C (°F)	4.5 (40.1)	4.7 (40.5)	7.5 (45.5)	12.5 (54.5)	17.2 (63.0)	20.9 (69.6)	25.1 (77.2)	26.2 (79.2)	22.4 (72.3)	17.1 (62.8)	11.9 (53.4)	7.0 (44.6)	14.8 (58.6)
Mean daily minimum °C (°F)	1.7 (35.1)	1.5 (34.7)	3.5 (38.3)	8.0 (46.4)	12.9 (55.2)	17.5 (63.5)	22.1 (71.8)	23.0 (73.4)	19.2 (66.6)	13.6 (56.5)	8.5 (47.3)	3.9 (39.0)	11.3 (52.3)
Record low °C (°F)	−6.0 (21.2)	−6.4 (20.5)	−4.4 (24.1)	−0.1 (31.8)	4.7 (40.5)	9.2 (48.6)	14.3 (57.7)	16.2 (61.2)	10.1 (50.2)	3.5 (38.3)	0.9 (33.6)	−4.4 (24.1)	−6.4 (20.5)
Average precipitation mm (inches)	260.4 (10.25)	163.7 (6.44)	154.2 (6.07)	104.5 (4.11)	112.0 (4.41)	145.3 (5.72)	183.8 (7.24)	153.1 (6.03)	251.4 (9.90)	172.3 (6.78)	204.4 (8.05)	295.7 (11.64)	2,213.5 (87.15)
Average snowfall cm (inches)	87 (34)	63 (25)	11 (4.3)	0 (0)	0 (0)	0 (0)	0 (0)	0 (0)	0 (0)	0 (0)	0 (0)	37 (15)	202 (80)
Average precipitation days (≥ 1.0 mm)	22.6	17.0	15.3	11.4	10.5	10.8	12.2	9.7	12.8	12.3	16.3	21.1	172
Average snowy days (≥ 3 cm)	8.0	5.8	1.1	0	0	0	0	0	0	0	0	3.3	18.2
Mean monthly sunshine hours	56.9	74.3	132.6	183.7	204.0	151.1	160.9	202.8	138.8	134.0	97.2	68.5	1,603.9
Source: JMA

== Popular culture ==
The popular visual novel and anime franchise Air was set in Kasumi.

== Transportation ==
=== Train stations ===
- JR-West
  - Sanin Main Line: Kasumi
  - Sanin Main Line: Satsu
  - Sanin Main Line: Shibayama
  - Sanin Main Line: Yoroi
  - Sanin Main Line: Amarube

=== Major roads ===
Route 178

== Attractions ==
=== Historical Sites ===
- Daijyō-ji Temple
- Amarube Viaduct

=== Other ===
- Misaki lighthouse A lighthouse in the Japan's highest place.
