= Ojiro (disambiguation) =

Ojiro (小代) is an area located in Kami Town, Mikata District, Hyōgo Prefecture, Japan.

Ojiro may also refer to:

- Aran Ojiro, fictional character from manga series Haikyu!!
- Makoto Ojiro, Japanese manga artist
- Mashirao Ojiro, fictional character from manga series My Hero Academia
- Ojiro Fumoto (born 1990), Japanese video game designer
