= Amarube Viaduct =

Railroad bridge in Japan

Amarube Viaduct 余部橋梁
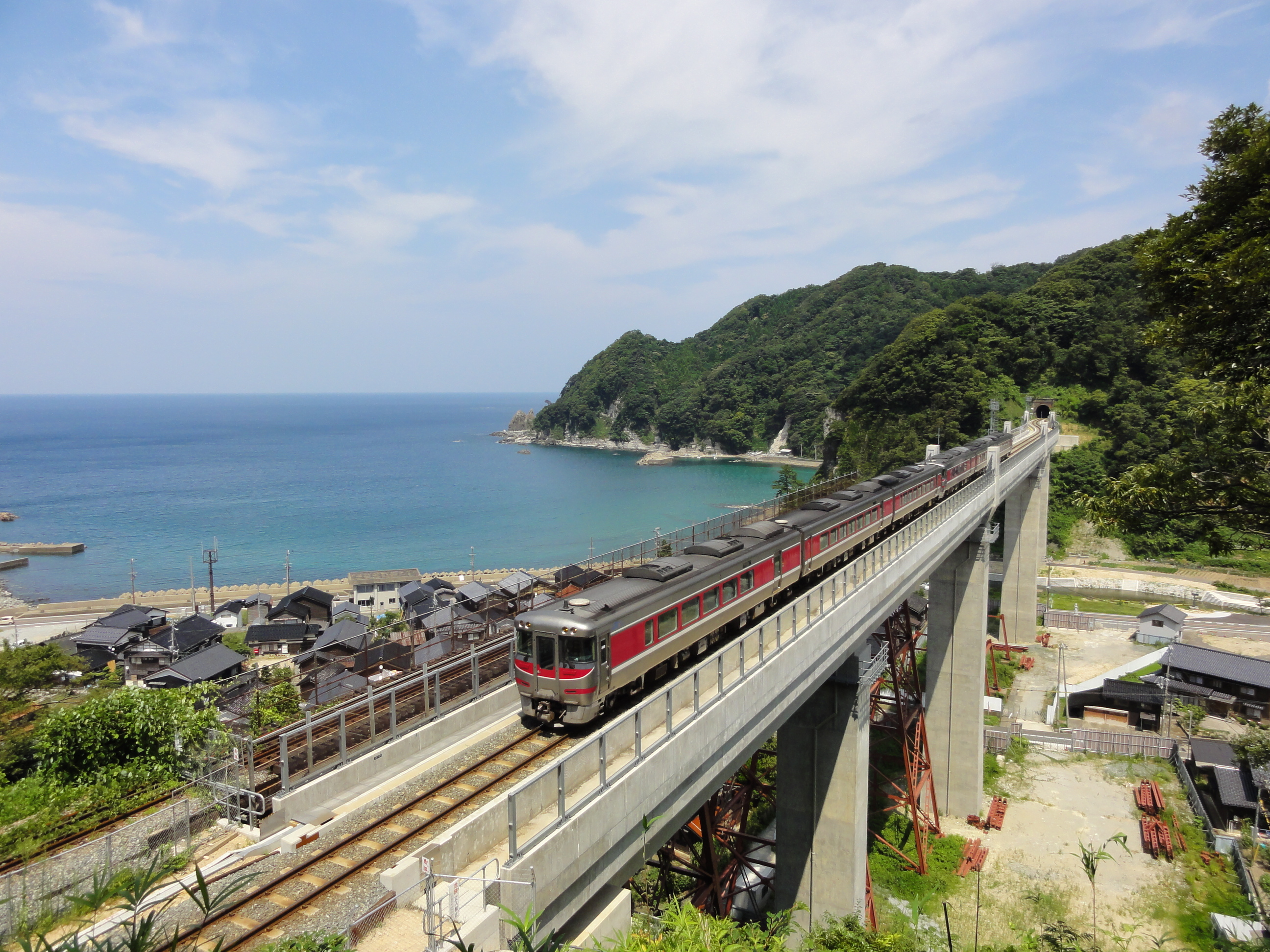
- A train crossing the new Amarube Viaduct, August 2011
- Coordinates: 35°38′59″N 134°33′36″E
- Carries: JR West Sanin Main Line
- Crosses: Hasegawa River
- Locale: Hyōgo Prefecture

Characteristics
- Design: Extradosed bridge
- Material: Prestressed concrete
- Total length: 310.6 m (1,019 ft)
- Width: 7.25 m (23.8 ft)
- Height: 41.5 m (136.2 ft)
- Longest span: 82.5 m (270.7 ft)

History
- Construction start: 2007-03-08
- Construction end: 2011-02-24
- Opened: 2010-08-12
- Replaces: Amarube Viaduct (1912)

Location
- Interactive map of Amarube Viaduct

The Amarube Viaduct (余部橋梁, Amarube Kyōryō) is a railway bridge in the town of Kami, Mikata District, Hyōgo Prefecture, on JR West's Sanin Main Line between the stations of Yoroi and Amarube.

The original steel trestle bridge opened in 1912, and was replaced with the current reinforced concrete bridge on 12 August 2010.

== Background ==
Work began on the original bridge in December 1909, and it opened for service March 1, 1912. It was 310.59 meters (1,019.0 ft) in length and 41.45 meters (136.0 ft) tall, constructed at a cost of 331,535 yen. It had 11 vertical supports and 23 sections of girders and National Route 178 passed beneath it. The structure's unique design and bright color made it popular not only with rail fans but tourists as well. The closest station is Amarube Station, and the mountain behind it provides a popular point from which photographers take pictures of the bridge. From March 6, 2008, the bridge was closed periodically for the construction of its replacement.

== Construction ==
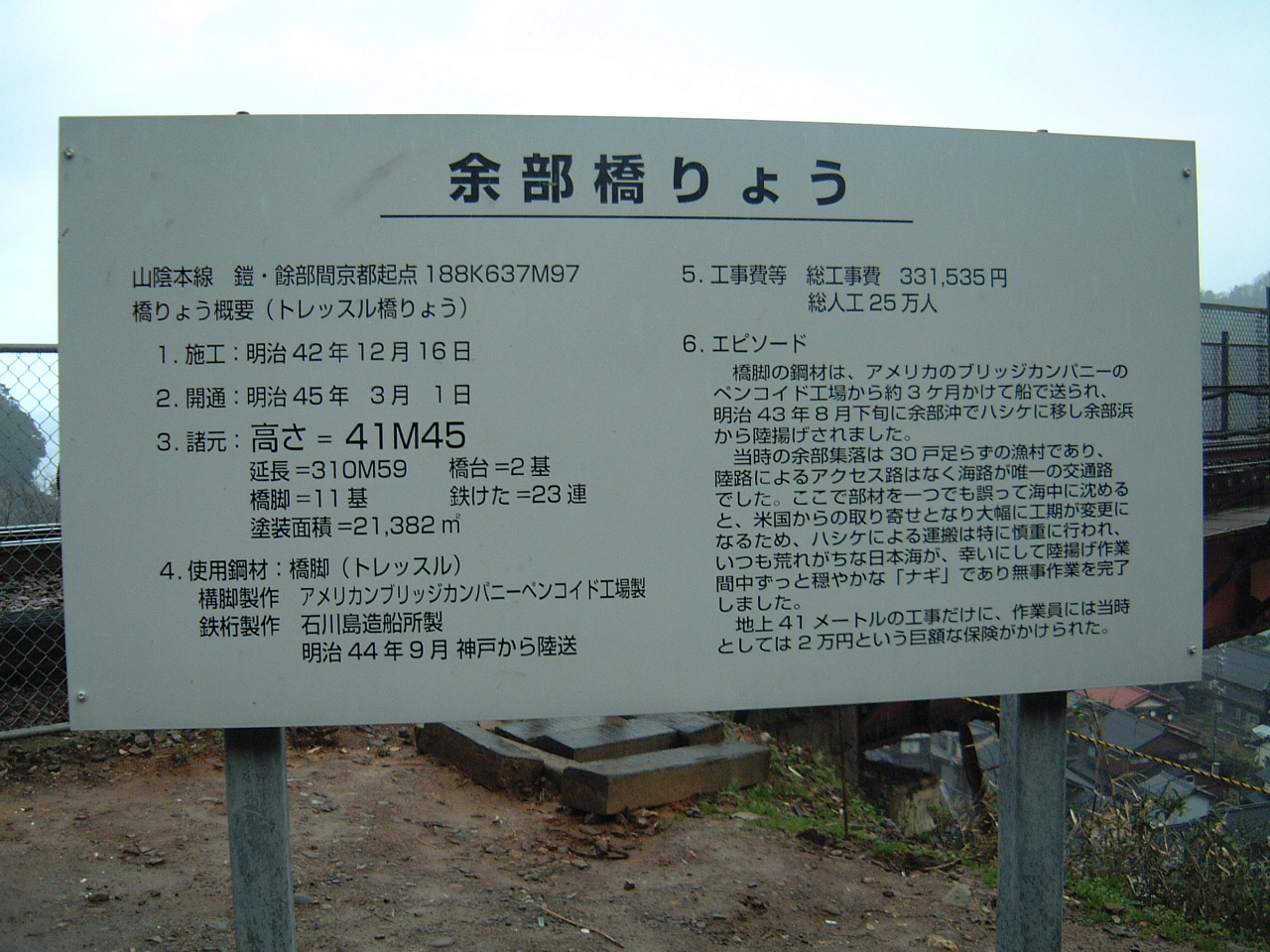
A signboard with statistics and history about the bridge (now moved to a different location)

The terrain along the Sea of Japan coast is very rugged between the towns of Kami and Shin'onsen, and it was necessary to lay the railbed amongst the mountains. However, due to the area's topography, it would also have to cross over villages between mountains. The route chosen incorporates large embankments and paths paralleling National Route 178. Although there was a plan for a concrete structure, it was dismissed as impractical, and an American engineer's opinion was sought. Taking that into consideration, Ministry of Railways engineer Seiichi Furukawa decided that it would be a trestle bridge. The steel for the piers was imported from the American Bridge Company's Pencoyd Iron Works via Kyūshū, and arrived in August 1910. Girders were made by Ishikawajima Shipworks (now IHI Corporation), and were sent from Kōbe in September 1911. Upon completion, its cost exceeded 330,000 yen and more than 250,000 people had worked on the project. Because of the tremendous danger involved with its construction, workers were covered by a 20,000 yen insurance plan.

This bridge was the San'in Main Line's most difficult project after the Tokan Tunnel, one end of which begins at the bridge's east end. Following the structure's completion, it completed the rail link from Kyōto to Izumo. Over 90 years after its completion, it remained Japan's largest railway trestle and had great historical value as an early railway structure.

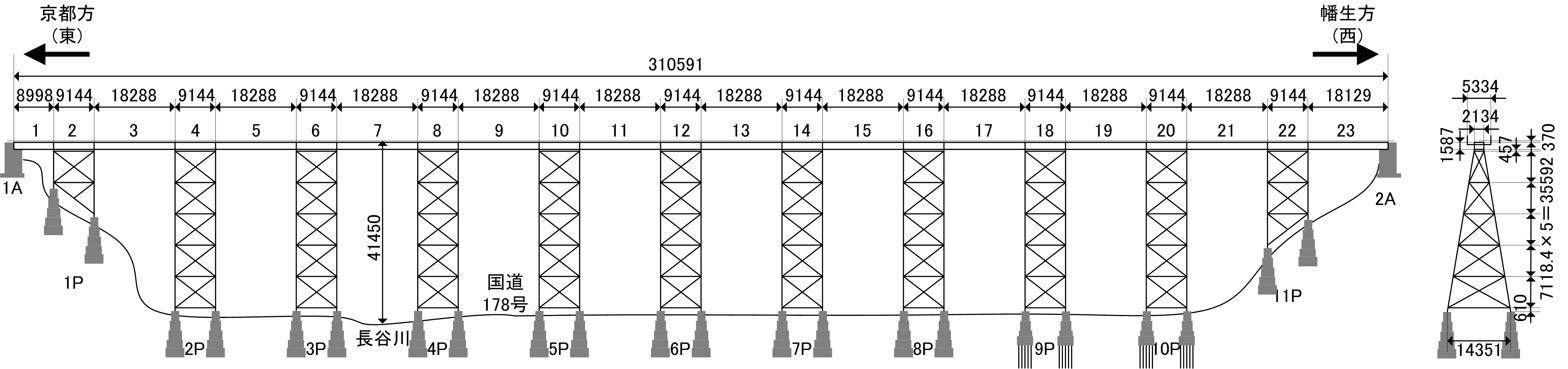

== Accident ==
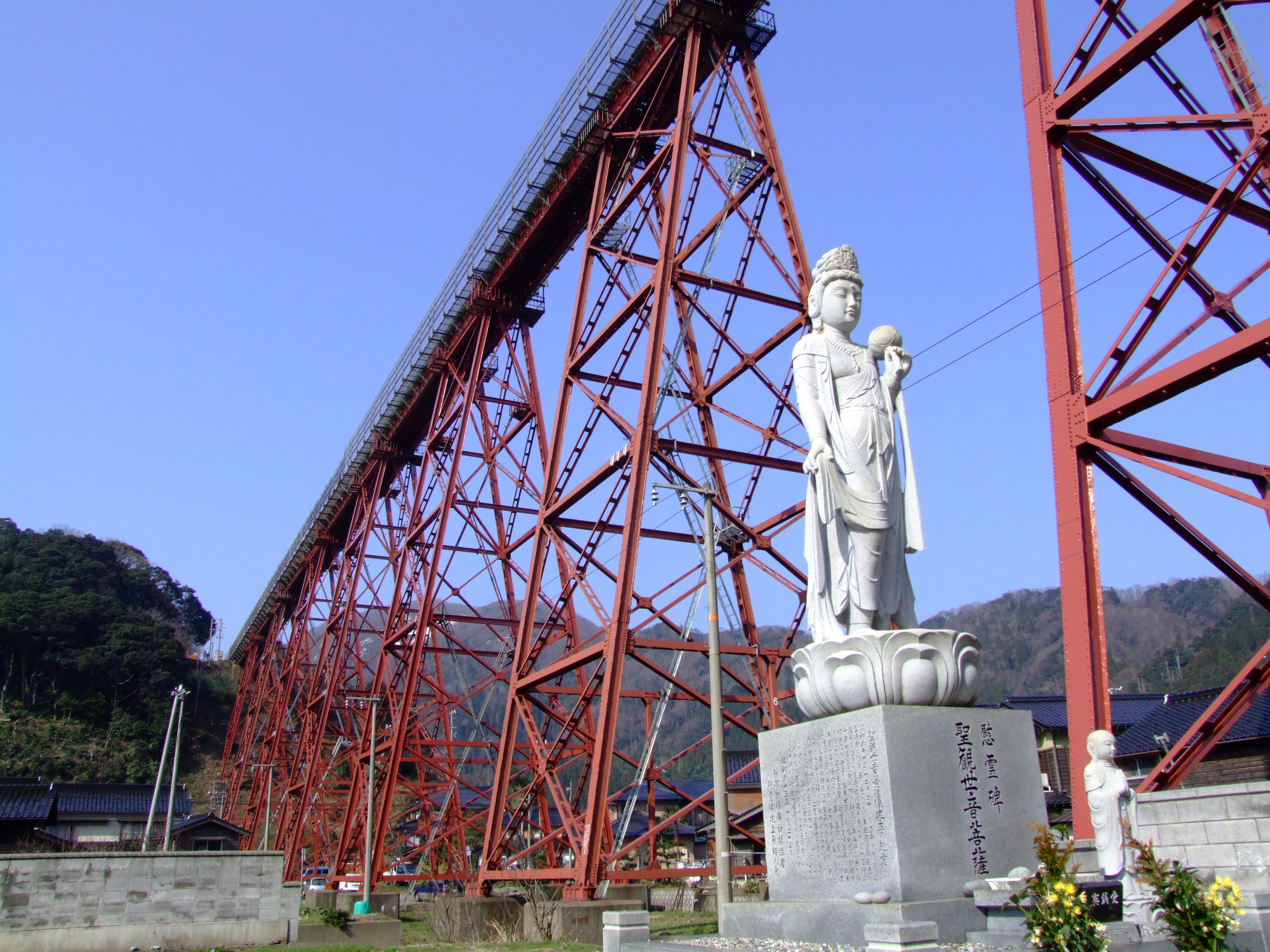
Cenotaph under the bridge

On December 28, 1986, around 1:25 pm, an out-of-service Miyabi train traveling from Kasumi Station was caught by strong winds from the Sea of Japan, and all seven passenger cars of the train were blown from the bridge, with only a few bogies remaining on the tracks. The locomotive's weight prevented its derailment. The cars fell directly below, landing on a fish-processing plant. Five women working at the plant and the train's conductor died in the accident. Five others in the plant and one food-service worker aboard the train were seriously injured.

This was the first disaster since the opening of the bridge. The accident is attributed to human error. Although the 25 m/s (56 mph) winds activated warning devices, the train proceeded across the bridge.

Following the accident, Japan National Railways reviewed their policies and decided to stop train operations when wind speeds exceeded 20 m/s (45 mph). Their guidelines for switching to substitute bus service became more stringent. A cenotaph was put in place on November 23, 1988, and on December 28 of each year a Buddhist service is held.

== Maintenance ==
To protect the bridge's piers from the salty air, the structure was repainted every few years. This continued until the bridge was replaced.

== New bridge construction ==
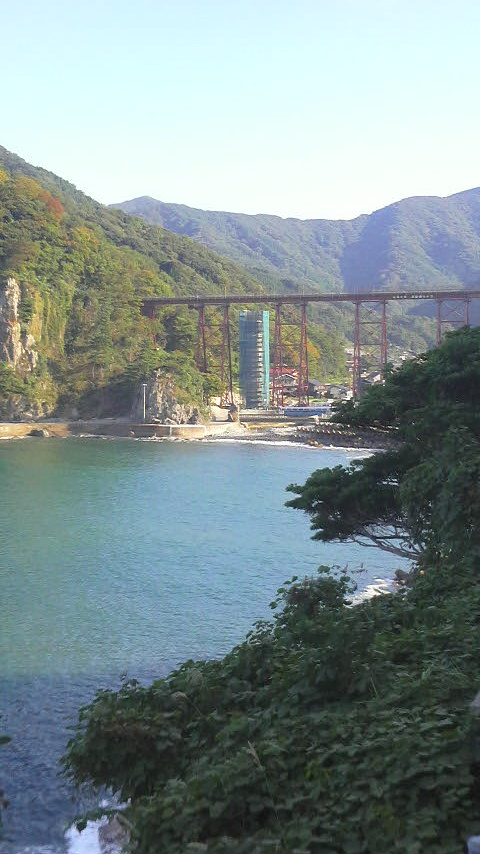
The new bridge piers under construction

=== Debate ===
Plans for bridge's replacement had been studied since the 1970s, however for financial reasons it was initially decided that the original structure would continue to be maintained. Due to the aging of the bridge, and in order to ensure the punctuality of trains, the prefectural governments of Tottori and Hyōgo with local municipalities organized and decided to proceed with the bridge's replacement. Following the accident of December 28, 1986, delays and cancellations increased, but the main reason for the delays was the increased frequency of service east of Kinosaki Onsen Station, and the operational problems caused by the line's single-track construction. Although the bridge was sometimes closed, it was not a strong influence on the decision. The new prestressed concrete bridge on the original structure's south side was built to allow trains to operate in wind conditions of up to 30 m/s. Its design allows for easy maintenance, and because local governments provided 80% of the cost, JR West planned to complete the work as quickly as possible. Work on the new bridge began in Spring 2007.

Sightseers and railfans voiced regret over the replacement of the bridge, including concern that the new concrete bridge will not be a draw for tourists. During 2006 and 2007, prior to the commencement of construction, the surrounding area was inundated with people hoping to see the original bridge one last time. Some trespassed on private property, and the unusually large number of visitors proved troublesome for local residents.

The Tottori Prefectural Assembly announced that it may withhold funding for the work if the overnight express service Izumo was discontinued.

There were calls for the preservation of the original structure, or the construction of a memorial hall. The local government formed a committee to consider requests that the 1986 accident be commemorated for future generations, including the suggestion that three vertical supports and girders closest to Amarube Station be retained. However, the cost of ongoing maintenance of any retained portion of the original structure resulted in the removal of the original bridge once its replacement opened.

On May 27, 2007, a ceremony marking the beginning of construction was held, attended by the governor of Hyōgo Prefecture as well as members of the Diet. The presence of construction vehicles detracted from the location's appeal to tourists, and the number of visitors decreased. With the completion of maintenance in October 2007, scaffolding was dismantled and stored in what was previously a parking lot for tourists. The parking lot has been moved to a location nearby.

Work on the new bridge began in earnest in October 2008, and both the observation area at the station and the station itself were closed for safety purposes. The bridge commenced service on 12 August 2010, and is listed as 310.6m long and 41.5m high.

=== Construction timeline ===
- November 2001 – the decision is made to construct a new bridge.
- October 2003 – prestressed concrete is chosen as the new structure's material.
- March 2005 – it is decided that the bridge will be a rigid frame bridge.
- March 2006 – the Hyōgo, Tottori, and local governments and JR West come to a basic agreement about the bridge.
- November 21, 2006 – JR West runs an express Amarube service between Himeji and Hamasaka. The nationwide "Bridge Summit" is held in the town of Kasumi.
- March 24 through April 1, 2007 – special train Omoide no Amarube is run between Toyooka and Hamasaka.
- March 29, 2007 – construction begins. The main companies were Shimizu Corporation and Zenitaka Corporation. Total cost for an extradosed bridge was estimated to be 3 billion yen.
- August 8, 2010 – official completion.

== See also ==
- List of wind-related railway accidents
