= The Most Beautiful Villages in Japan =

Japanese organization

The Association of the Most Beautiful Villages in Japan (「日本で最も美しい村」連合, Nihon de mottomo utsukushii mura rengō) is a Japanese nonprofit organization of listing some of the most beautiful villages and towns in Japan. The association is active on enhancement and protection of Japanese rural heritage, cultural fairs, and branding and promotion of regional, national, and international cooperation of its member villages and towns. It is affiliated to the international association The Most Beautiful Villages in the World.

== Overview ==
Established in 2005, the Association of the Most Beautiful Villages in Japan (titled as, the most beautiful villages in Japan) is an important player in the enhancement and conservation of Japanese rural heritage.

In line with the other members, such as France, Italy, Belgium, of the federation of the Most Beautiful Villages on Earth, Japan has common interests: authenticity, quality and presentation of the heritage as a source of sustainable development and life. Activities of the association include managing the rights of the use of the title name "the most beautiful villages in Japan" and its branding, providing common research and study platform to the member towns and villages for development and cooperation, conducting rural crafts show and food fairs for tourism development, annual photo contests and advocating social awareness about the supreme importance of the rural cultural and natural heritage for its conservation for the future generations.

== History ==
- October 2005 - The mayor of Biei, a town in Japan's Hokkaido prefecture, initiates the founding of the association. 7 towns join the initiative.
- February 2006 - The Association of the Most Beautiful Village in Japan is officially registered as a Japanese Non-Profit Organization.
- October 2006 - Kiso, a town in Nagano Prefecture, and Takaharu, a town in Miyazaki Prefecture, join the association.
- October 2007 - Shibetsu, a town in Hokkaido prefecture, and Gero, a city in Gifu Prefecture, join the association.
- October 2008 - Tsurui village, Kyōgoku (a town in Hokkaido prefecture), Iide (a town in Yamagata Prefecture), Nakagawa village, Nagiso (a town in Nagano Prefecture), Ine (a town in Kyoto Prefecture), and Umaji (a village in Kōchi Prefecture) join the association.
- October 2009 - With the addition of 15 new towns and villages, the total membership of the association reaches 33.
- August 2010 - The Association of The Most Beautiful Villages in Japan joins the international federation The Most Beautiful Villages in the World.
- September 2010 - 6 more towns and villages join the association, increasing its total membership to 39.
- October 2011 - 5 more towns and villages join the association, increasing its total membership to 44.
- October 2012 - 5 more towns and villages join the association, increasing its total membership to 49.

== List of member villages and towns ==
- Biei town Hokkaido prefecture
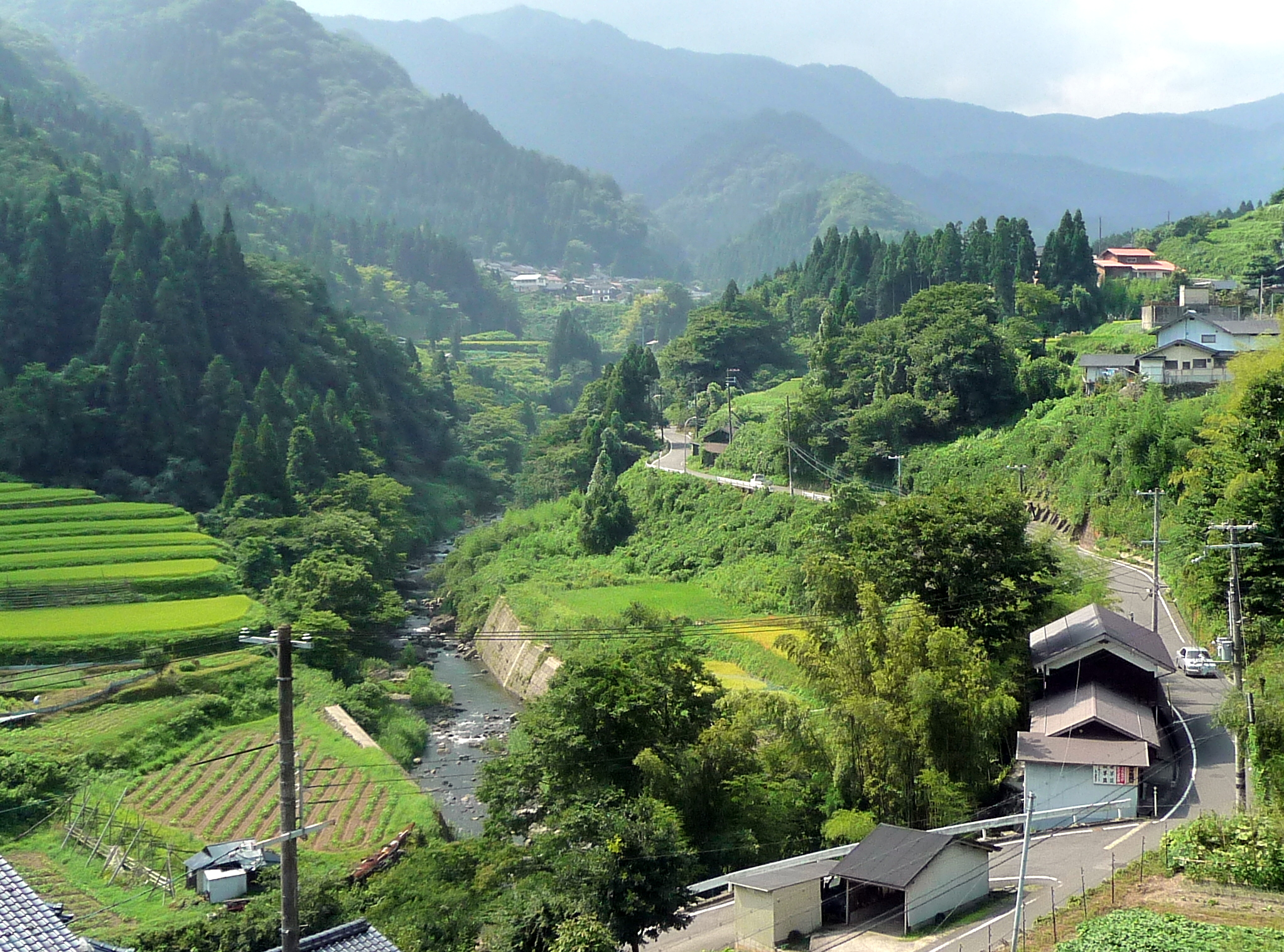
  Ojiro, Kami town Hyōgo Prefecture
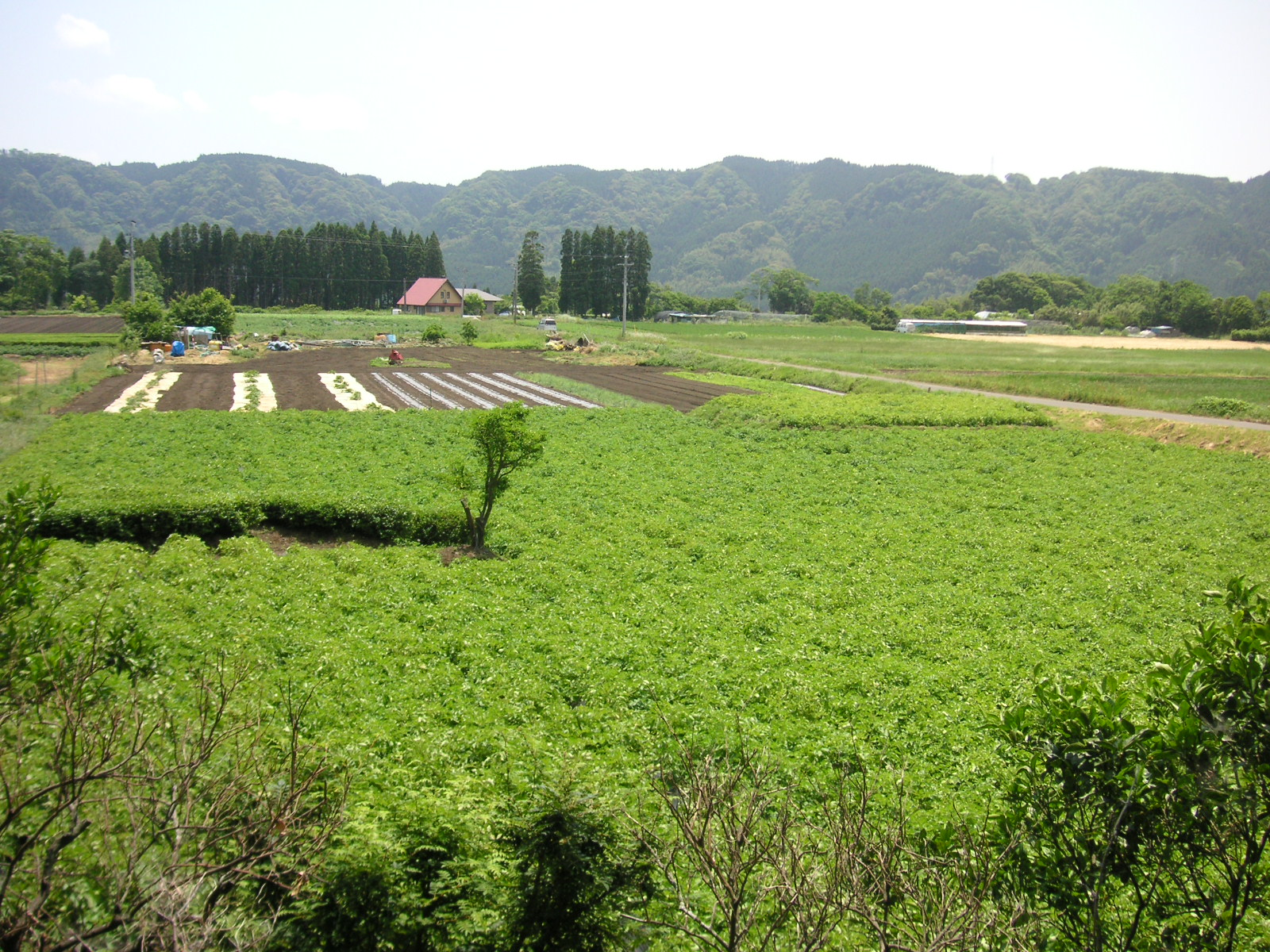
  Aya town Miyazaki Prefecture
- Akaigawa village Hokkaido prefecture
- Shibetsu town Hokkaido prefecture
- Tsurui village Hokkaido prefecture
- Kyōgoku town Hokkaido prefecture
- Kosaka town Akita Prefecture
- Higashinaruse village Akita Prefecture
- Ōkura village Yamagata Prefecture
- Iide town Yamagata Prefecture
- Iitate village Fukushima Prefecture
- Kitashiobara village Fukushima Prefecture
- Shōwa village of Gunma Prefecture
- Isama, Nakanojō town Gunma Prefecture
- Kuni, Nakanojō town Gunma Prefecture
- Hayakawa town Yamanashi Prefecture
- Ōshika village Nagano Prefecture
- Kiso town Nagano Prefecture
- Nagiso town Nagano Prefecture
- Nakagawa village Nagano Prefecture
- Ogawa village Nagano Prefecture
- Takayama village Nagano Prefecture
- Maze, Gero city Gifu Prefecture
- Shirakawa village Gifu Prefecture
- Ine town Kyoto Prefecture
- Ojiro, Kami town Hyōgo Prefecture
- Wazuka, Kyoto Prefecture
- Soni village Nara Prefecture
- Totsukawa village Nara Prefecture
- Shinjō village Okayama Prefecture
- Chizu town Tottori Prefecture
- Kamikatsu town Tokushima Prefecture
- Kamijima town Ehime Prefecture
- Umaji village Kōchi Prefecture
- Hoshino, Yame city Fukuoka Prefecture
- Tōhō village Fukuoka Prefecture
- Ojika town Nagasaki Prefecture
- Minamioguni town Kumamoto Prefecture
- Tsukahara, Yufu city Ōita Prefecture
- Takaharu town Miyazaki Prefecture
- Aya town Miyazaki Prefecture
- Kikai town Kagoshima Prefecture
- Tarama village Okinawa Prefecture

(as of October 2012)

== Some criteria for membership ==
1. About less than 10,000 population.
2. Requires two or more local resources to be classified i.e., landscape, environment and culture.
  1. Having regional sustainable resources.
  2. Efforts must be taken for sustainable use of local resources.
  3. Local resources must be already protected by public means, such as Ordinance.
