= San'in Kaigan Geopark =

Geopark in Japan

Coordinates: 35.5880°N 134.8043°E

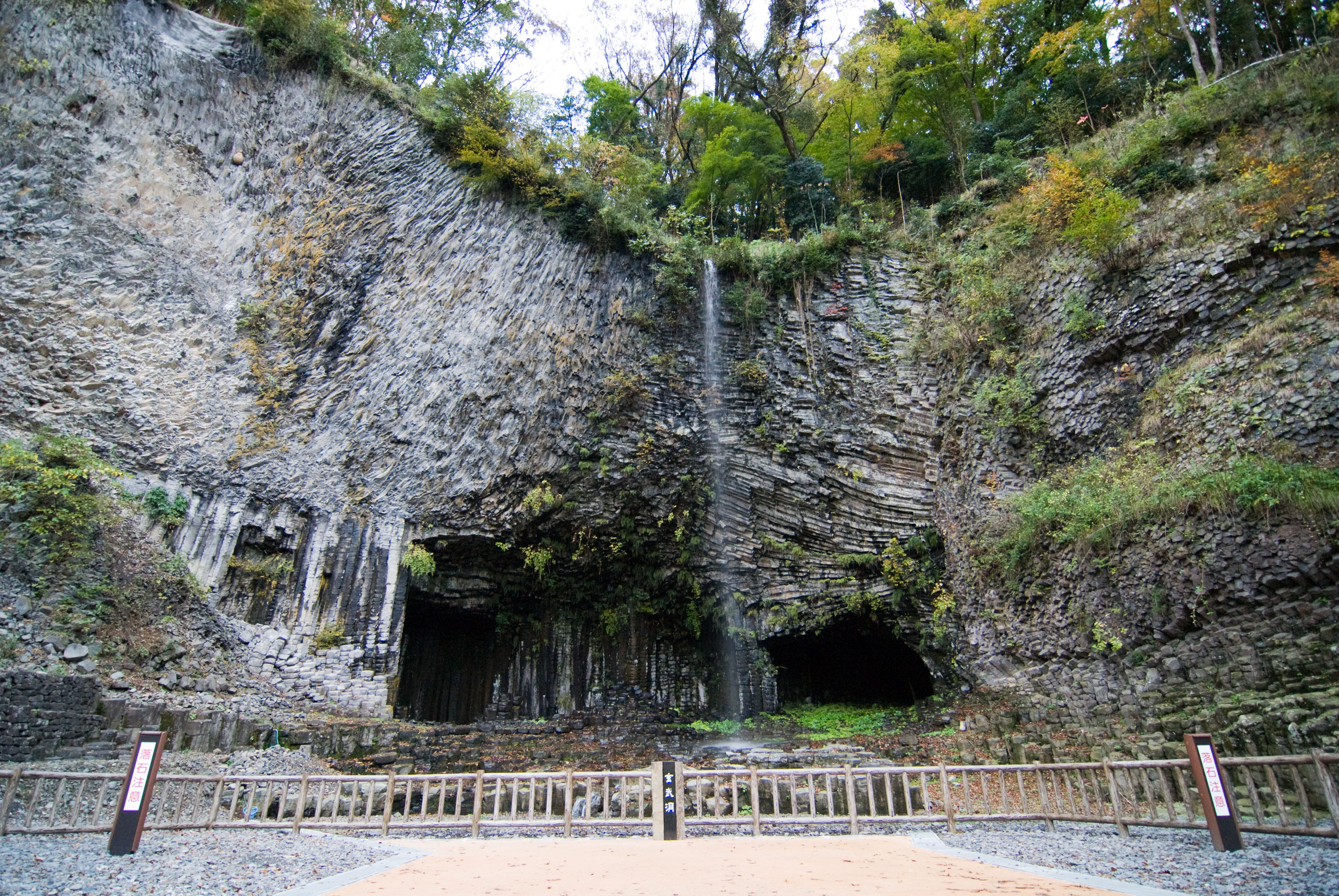
Genbudo Cave in Toyooka

The San'in Kaigan Geopark (山陰海岸ジオパーク) is a geopark in Japan. The area was declared a Japanese Geopark in 2008, and a UNESCO Global Geopark in 2010. The underlying themes of the geopark are "geological features, the natural environment, people's lives, and the formation of the Sea of Japan". This geologically diverse area contains records of the process from when Japan was part of the Asian continent to its present-day formation of the Sea of Japan. People's lives are also diverse in this area because of its geodiversity.

== Area ==
The San'in Kaigan Geopark is located to the northwest of Osaka and Kyoto and consists of Kyotango in Kyoto Prefecture, Toyooka, Kami, and Shin'onsen in Hyōgo Prefecture, Iwami, and a major part of Tottori in Tottori Prefecture. The geopark has an area of 2,458.44 square kilometers.

== Geosites ==
The geopark includes sites that relate to the surrounding geomorphology and geology. Examples include the rice terraces and Tajima cattle grazing areas located on the gentle slopes formed by landslides, red snow crabs and other fishery products from the Sea of Japan, the Oriental white stork habitat in the Toyooka Basin, the local handbag manufacturing industry, onsen (hot springs), and the cultivation of melons and Chinese shallots in the sand dunes.

=== IUGS geological heritage site ===
One of the major geosites is Genbudo Cave formed in Quaternary basalt, located in Toyooka City. This site is internationally significant, as it is where reversed geomagnetic polarity was first proposed and in respect of its importance in this regard, Genbudo Cave was included by the International Union of Geological Sciences (IUGS) in its assemblage of 100 'geological heritage sites' around the world in a listing published in October 2022. The organisation defines an 'IUGS Geological Heritage Site' as 'a key place with geological elements and/or processes of international scientific relevance, used as a reference, and/or with a substantial contribution to the development of geological sciences through history.'

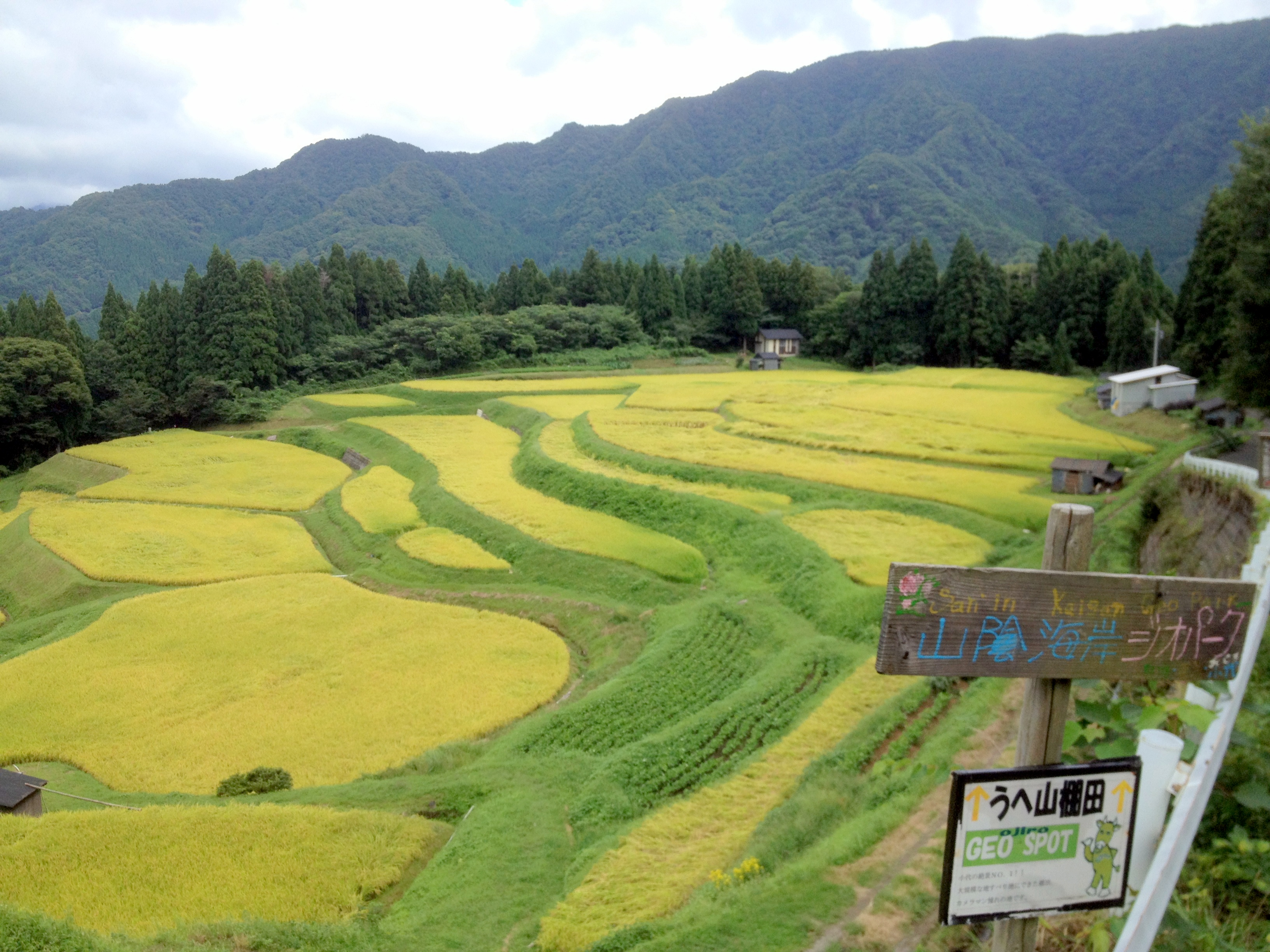
Rice terraces of Ueyama in Ojiro, Kami

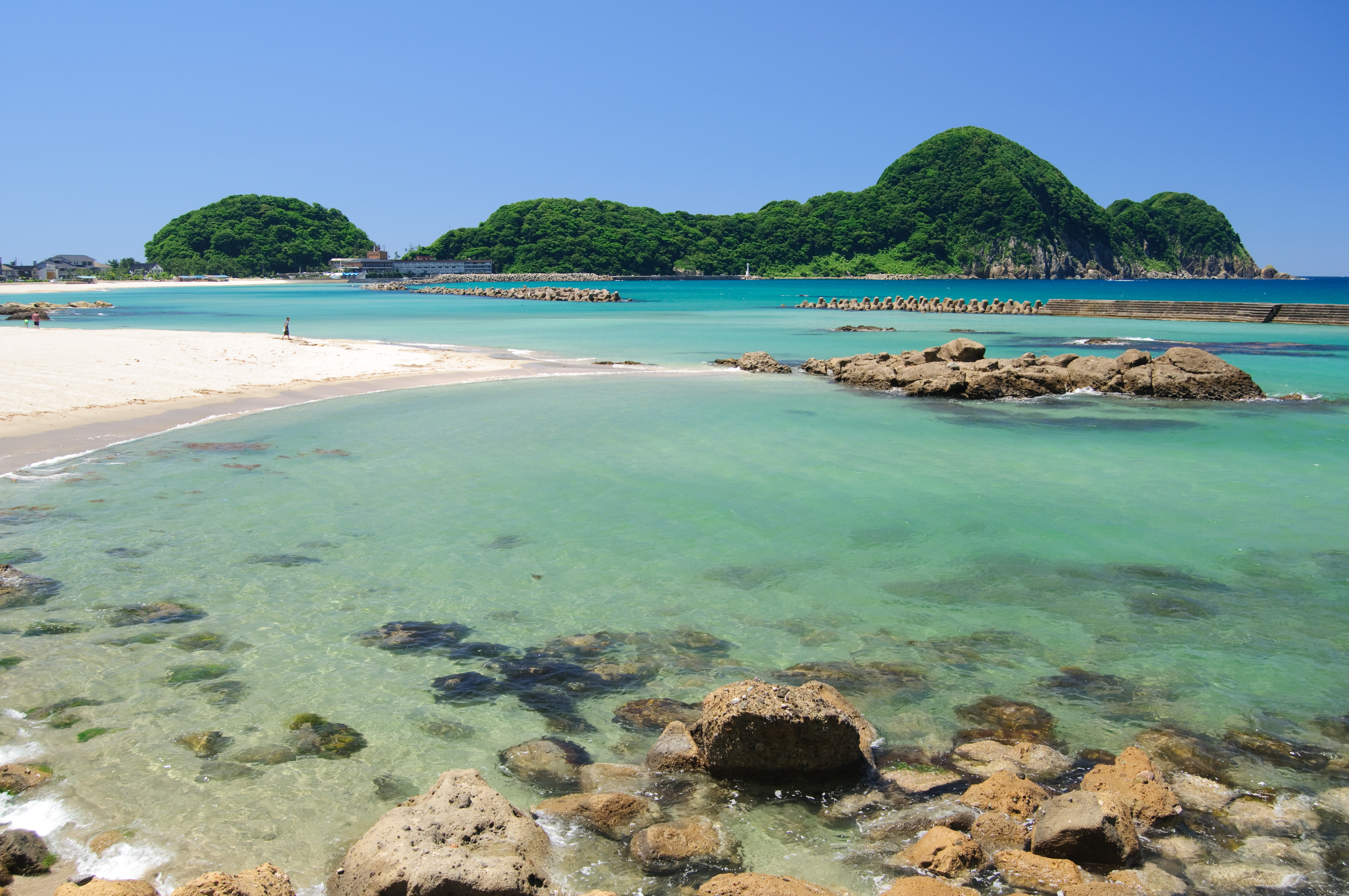
Nekozaki Peninsula and Takeno Beach in Toyooka

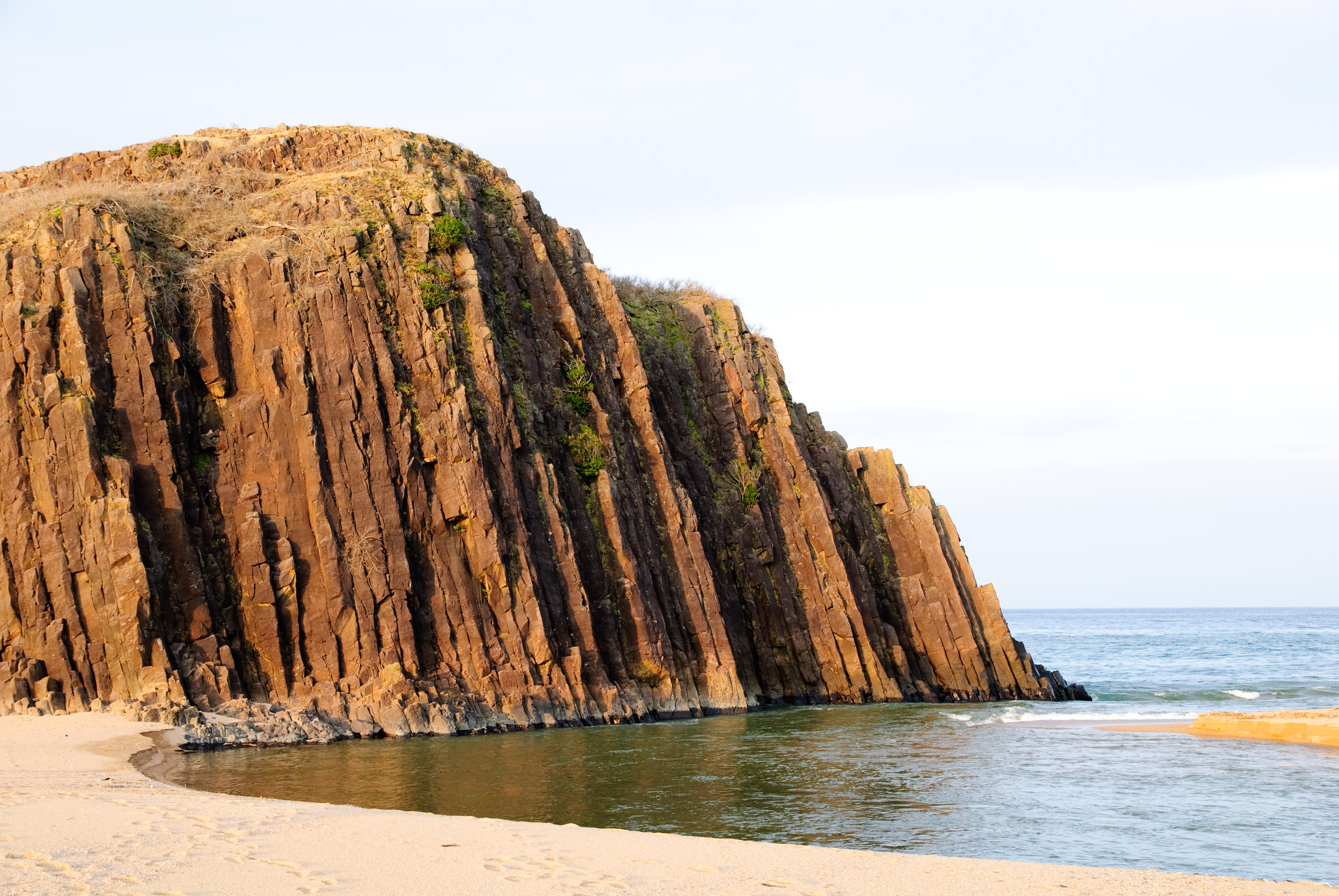
Tate-iwa Rock in Kyotango

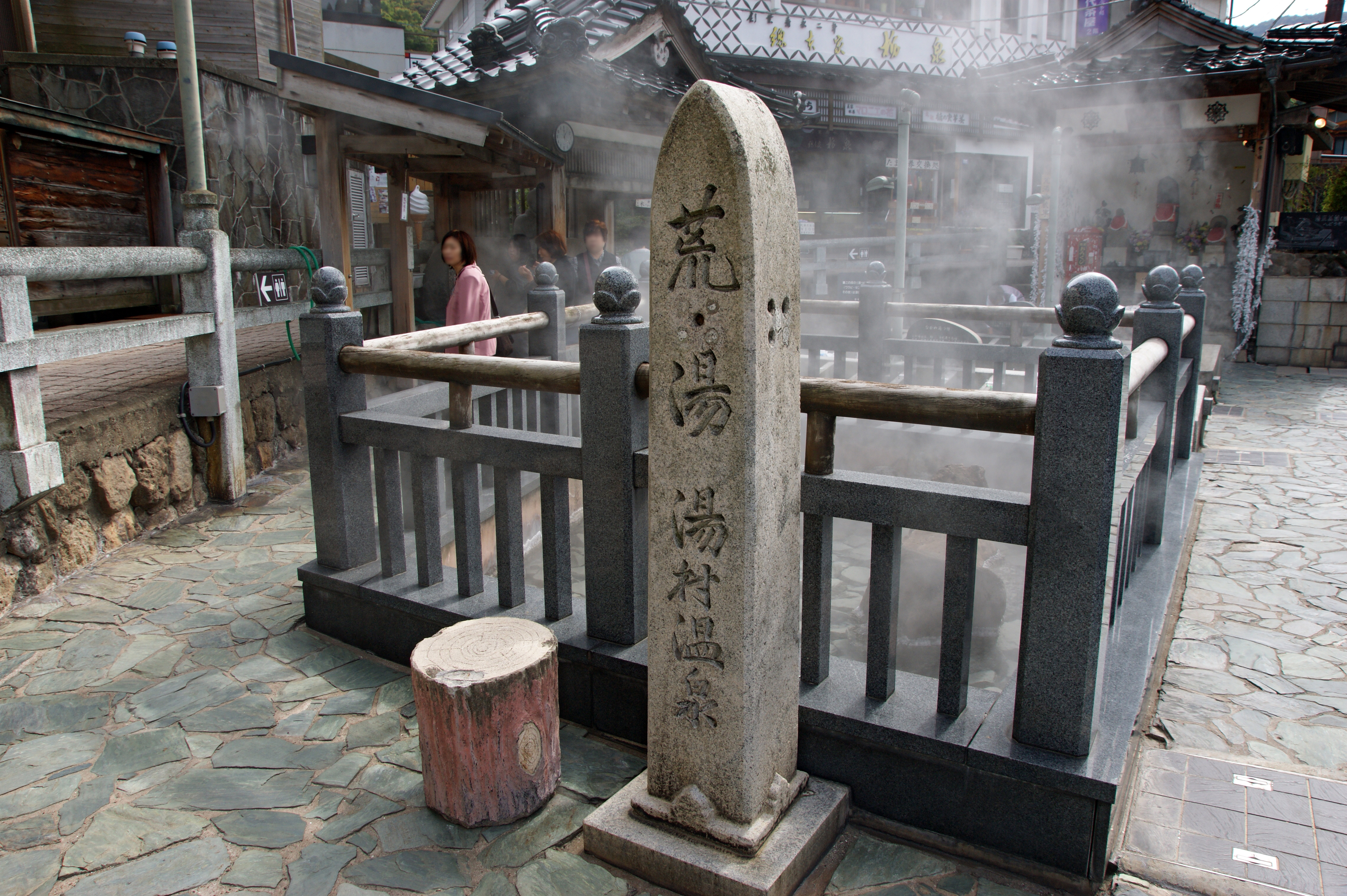
Yumura Onsen "Arayu" in Shin'onsen

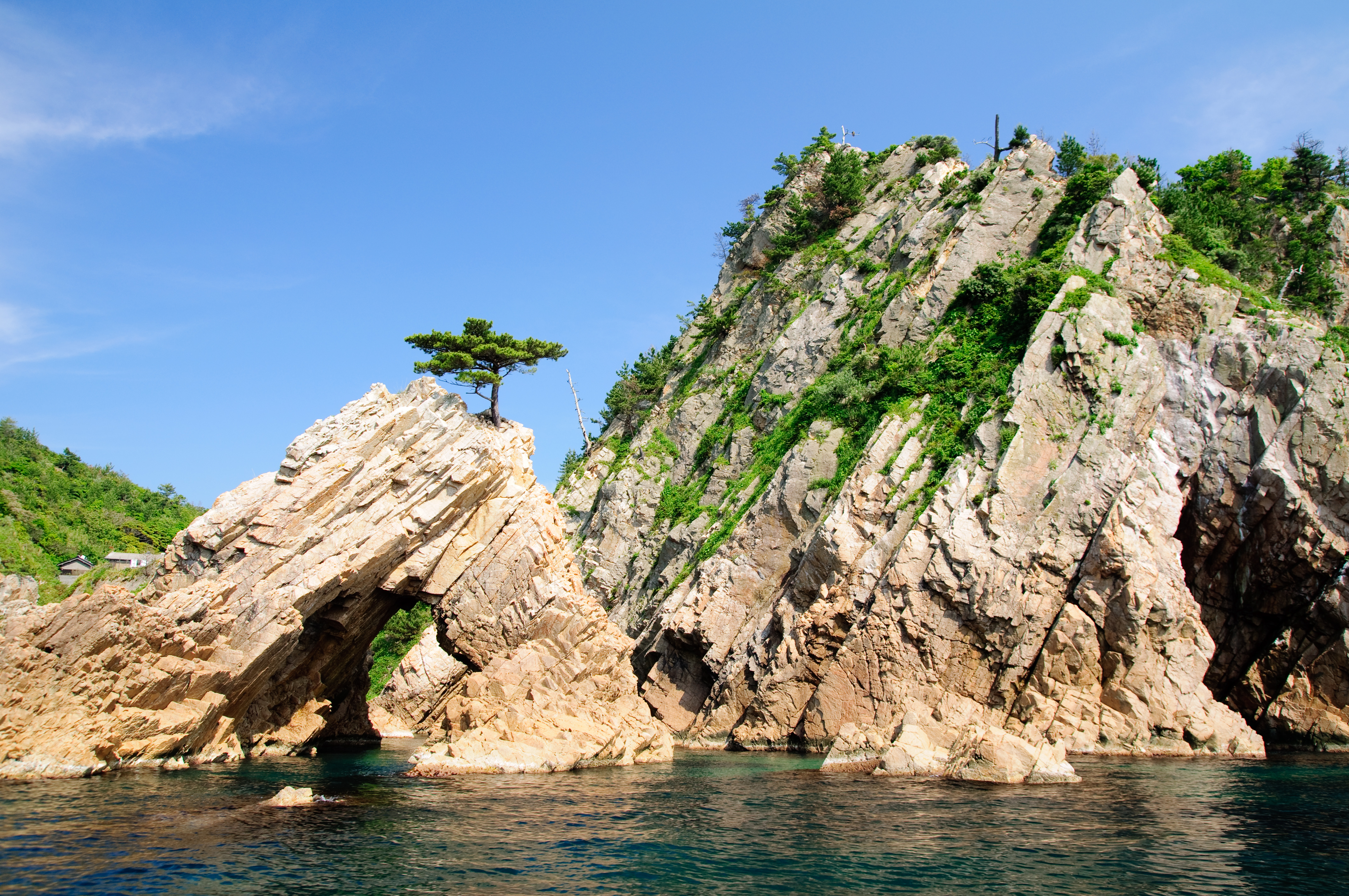
Uradome Coast Sengan-Matsushima in Iwami

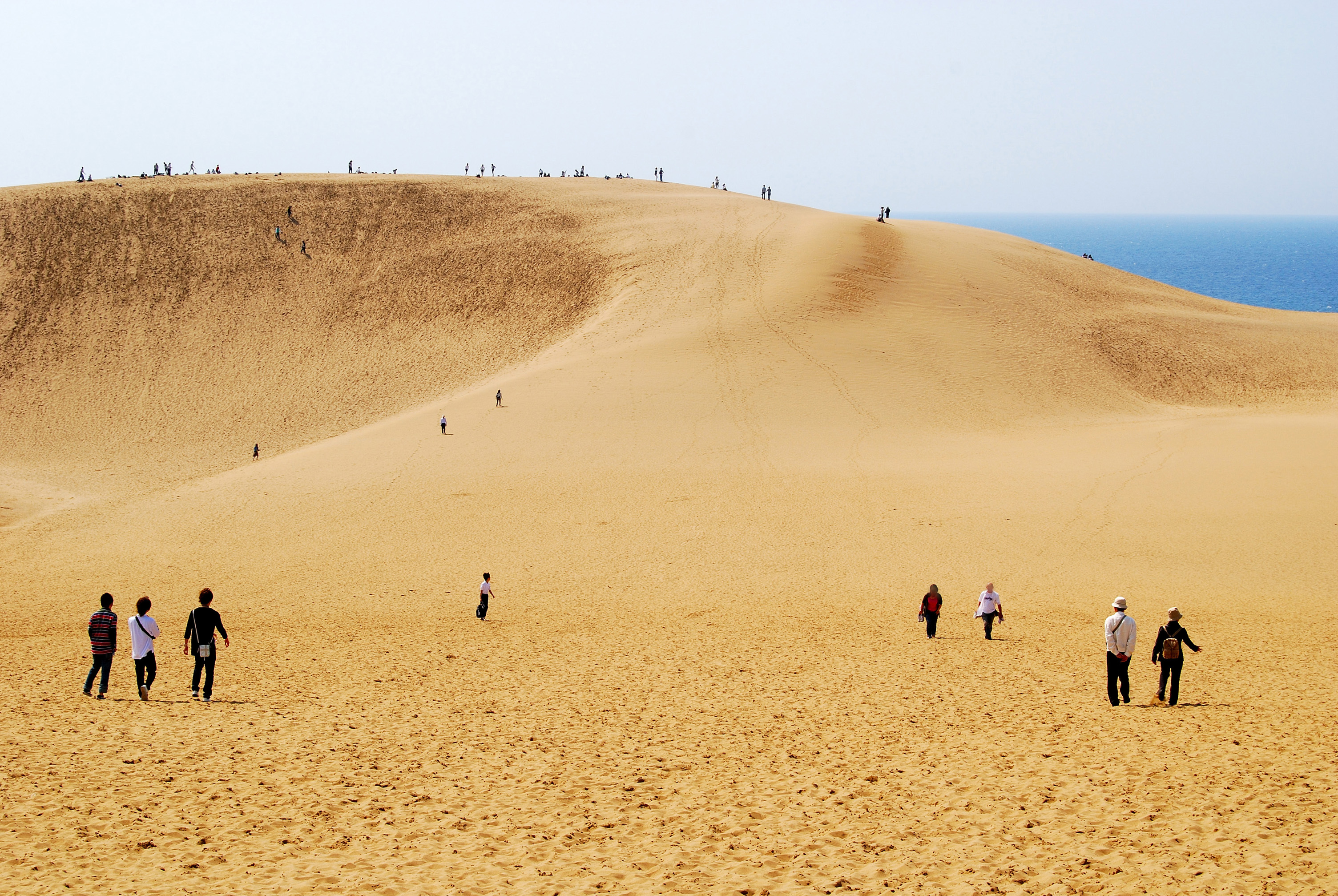
Tottori Sand Dunes in Tottori
