= Mikata, Hyōgo =

Dissolved municipality in Hyōgo prefecture, Japan

Mikata (美方町, Mikata-chō) was a town located in Mikata District, Hyōgo, Japan.

As of 2003, the town had an estimated population of 2,523 and a density of 38.13 persons per km^{2}. The total area was 66.16 km^{2}.

See Ojiro if you want to know the present situation of this area.

This town was created on April 1, 1955, by the amalgamation of the village of Ojiro and the village of Isou. But on April 1, 1961, the portion of Mikata that was Isou merged into the town of Muraoka, because those who in Ojiro and Isou were not friendly.

On April 1, 2005, Mikata, along with the town of Kasumi, and the town of Muraoka, was merged to create the town of Kami, and no longer exists as an independent municipality. The portion of Kami that was Mikata is now known as Ojiro-ku (小代区), or Ojiro Ward.
