= Tajima Plateau Botanical Gardens =

Botanical gardens in Kami, Hyōgo, Japan

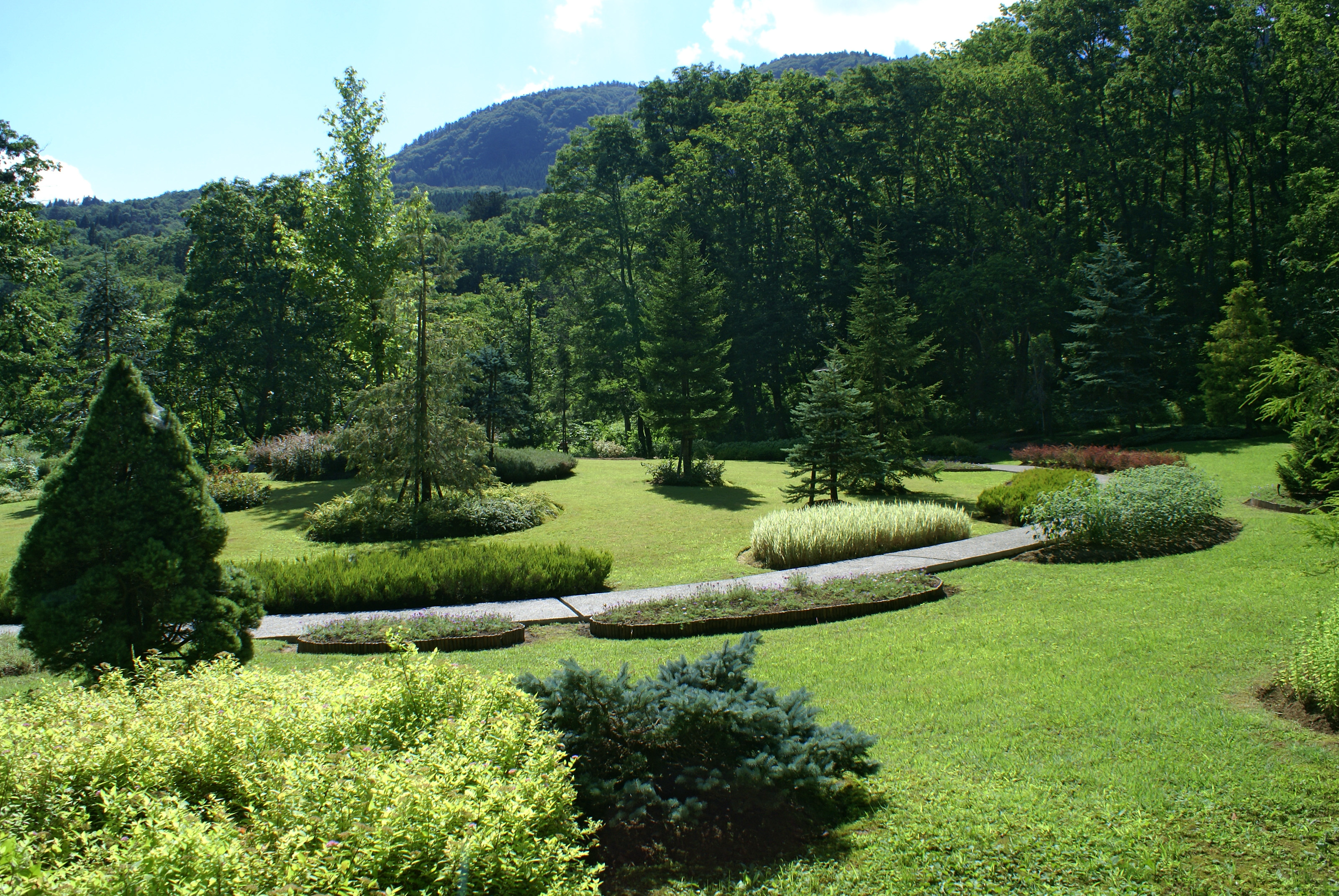
- Tajima Plateau Botanical Gardens
- Interactive map of Tajima Plateau Botanical Gardens
- Type: Botanical garden
- Location: Kami, Hyōgo, Tokyo, Japan
- Coordinates: 35°25′17″N 134°34′20″E
- Area: 17 hectares (42 acres)
- Created: 16 June 1997

The Tajima Plateau Botanical Gardens (但馬高原植物園, Tajima Kōgen Shokubutsuen; 17 hectares) are botanical gardens located at 709 Wachi, Muraoka-cho, Mikata-gun, Kami, Hyōgo, Japan. They are open daily in the warmer months; an admission fee is charged.

The gardens were established in 1997, and now contain more than 1,000 native plant species, a Katsura tree (Cercidiphyllum japonicum) that the garden describes as more than 1,000 years old, and water features including a stream, ponds, and swamp.

== See also ==
- List of botanical gardens in Japan
