= Amarube Station =

Railway station in Kami, Hyōgo Prefecture, Japan

Amarube Station 餘部駅
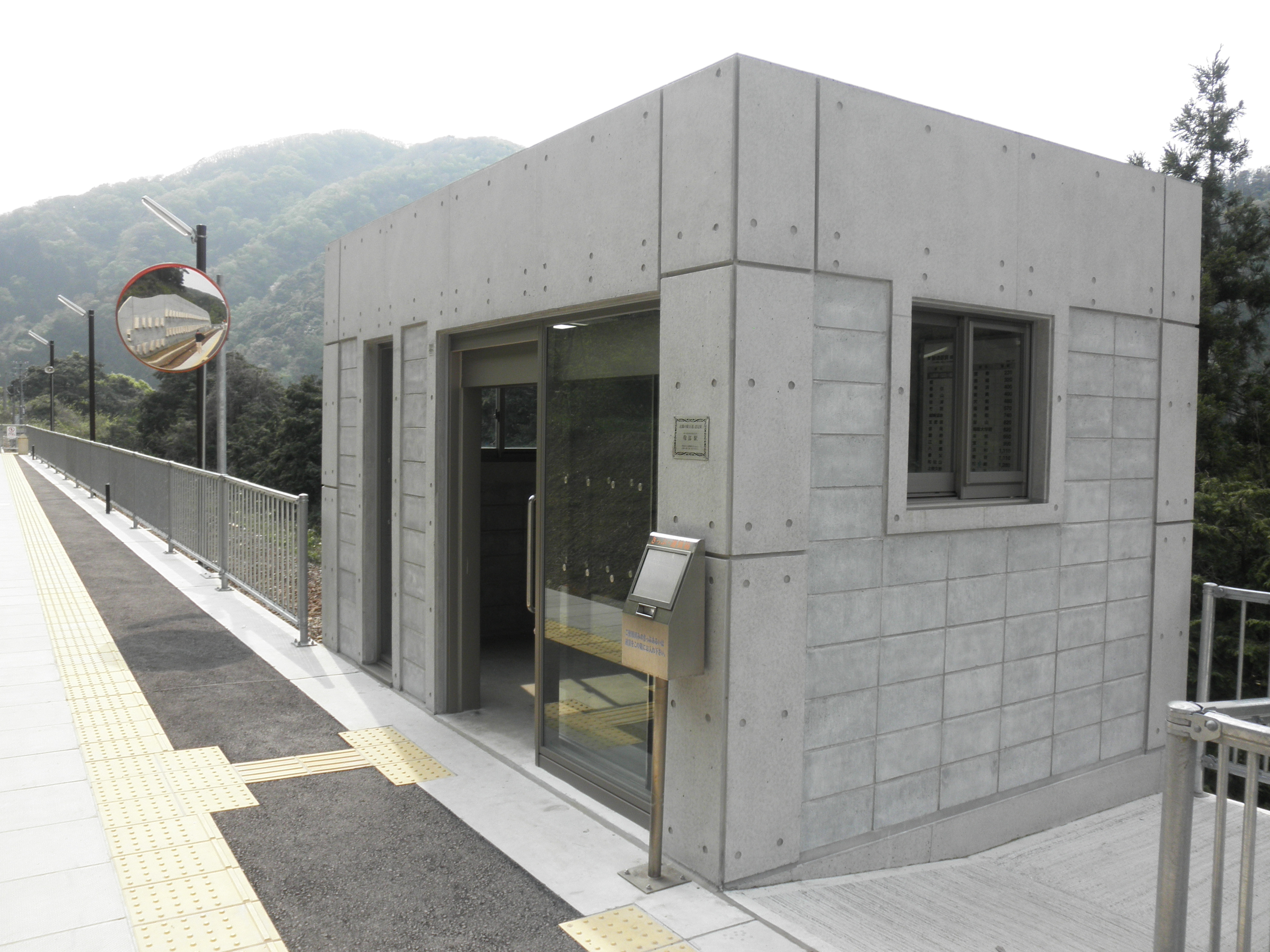
- Amarube Station, April 2011

General information
- Location: Kasumiku Amarube, Kami Town, Mikata District, Hyōgo Prefecture 669-6671; Japan
- Coordinates: 35.648641°N 134.556876°E
- Operator: JR West
- Line: San'in Main Line
- Distance: 187.2 km (116.3 miles) from Kyoto
- Platforms: 1 side platform
- Tracks: 1
- Connections: Bus stop

Construction
- Structure type: At grade

Other information
- Status: Unstaffed
- Website: Official website

History
- Opened: 16 April 1959; 67 years ago

Passengers
- FY2016: 55 daily

Services
Preceding station	JR West	Following station
Kutani towards Yonago	San'in Line	Yoroi towards Kinosaki-Onsen
Location
- Location within Hyōgo Prefecture Location within Kansai region Location within Japan

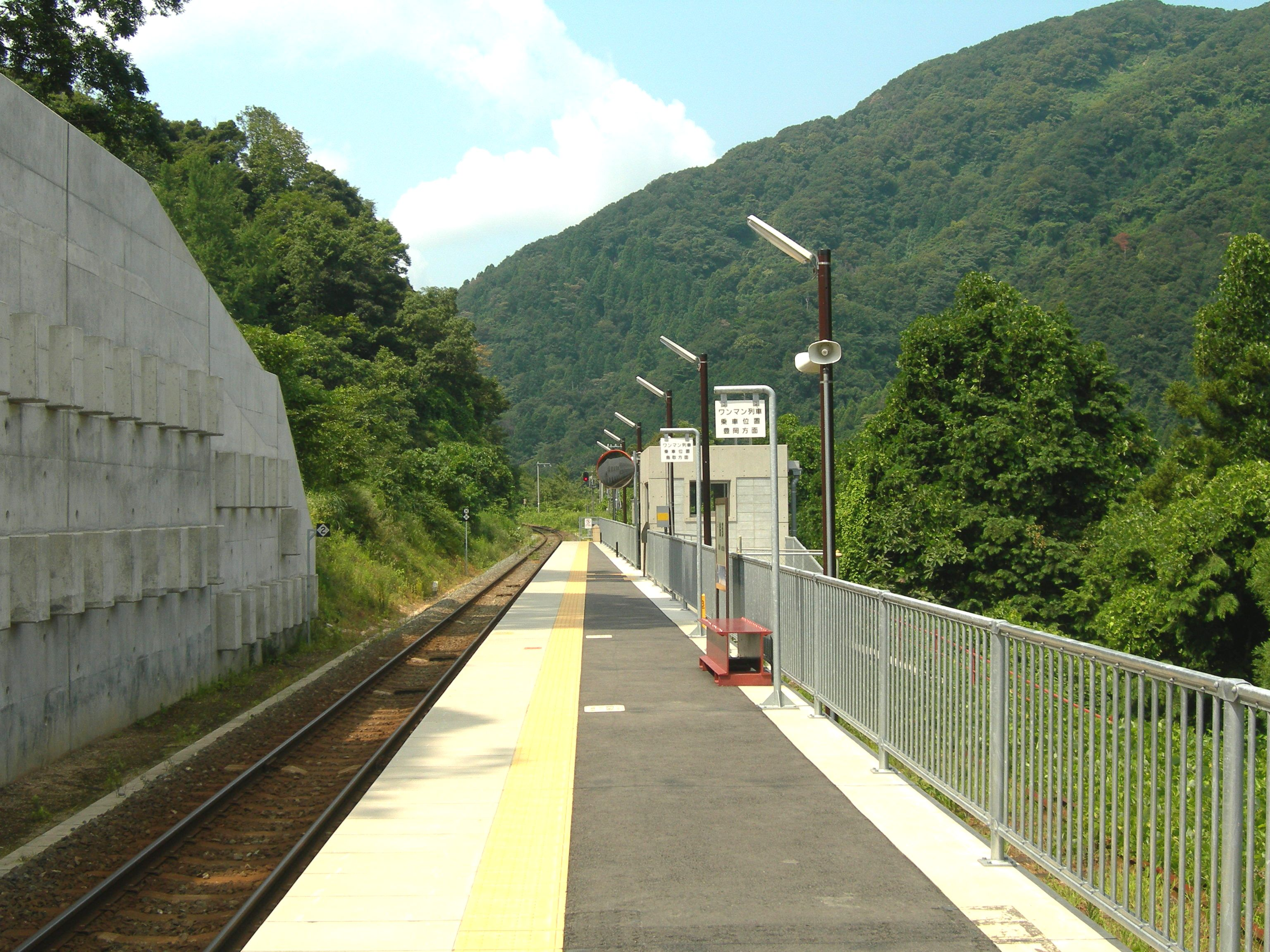
Platform

Amarube Station (餘部駅, Amarube-eki) is a passenger railway station located in the town of Kami, Mikata District, Hyōgo, Japan, operated by West Japan Railway Company (JR West). The railway is carried into the station across the Amarube Viaduct. It opened on April 16, 1959.

== Lines ==
Amarube Station is served by the San'in Main Line, and is located 187.2 kilometers from the terminus of the line at Kyoto.

== Station layout ==
The station consists of one side platform serving a single bi-directional track. The station is unattended.

== Gallery ==
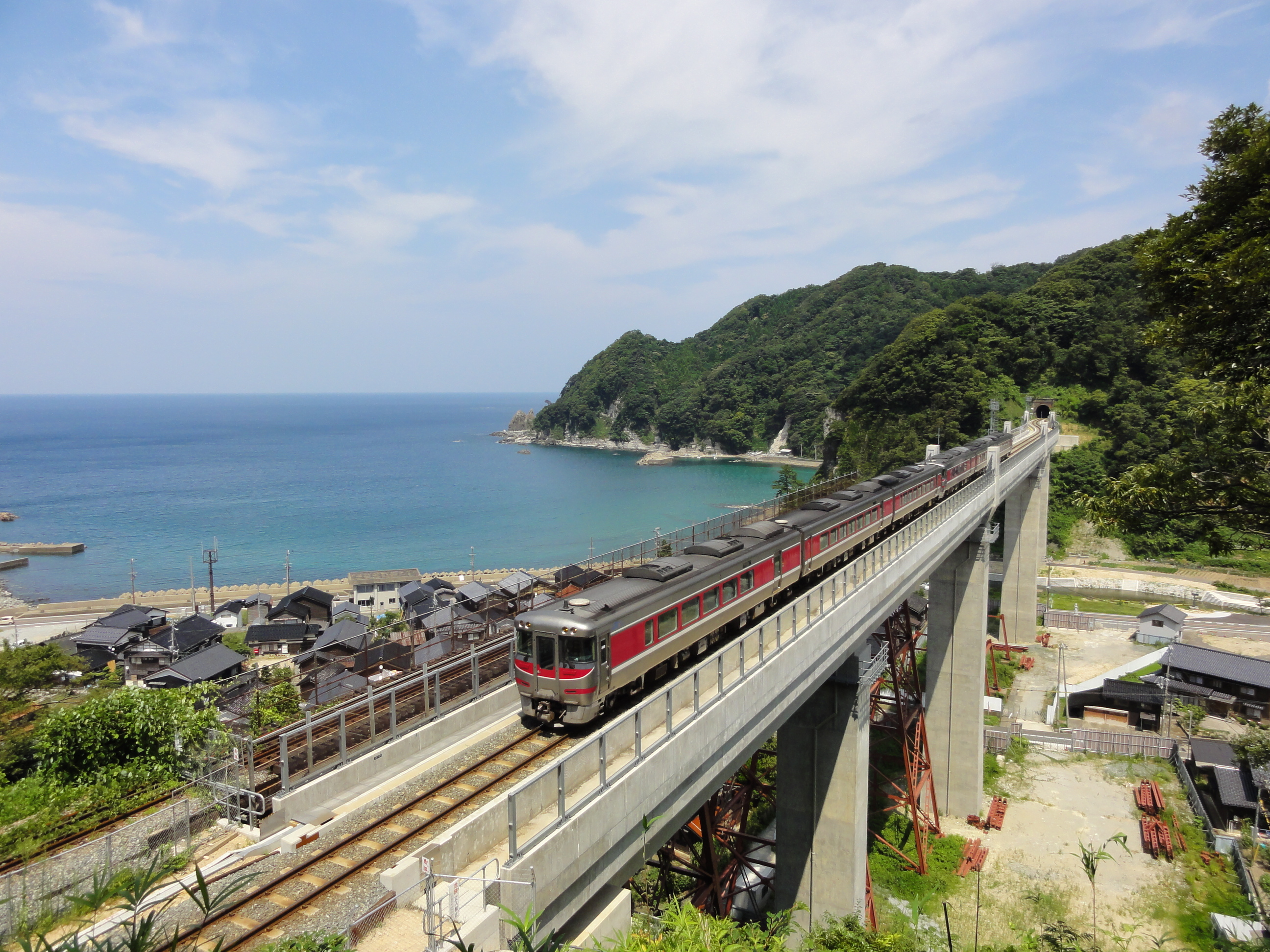
View of the Amarube railway bridge with a KiHa 189 series train

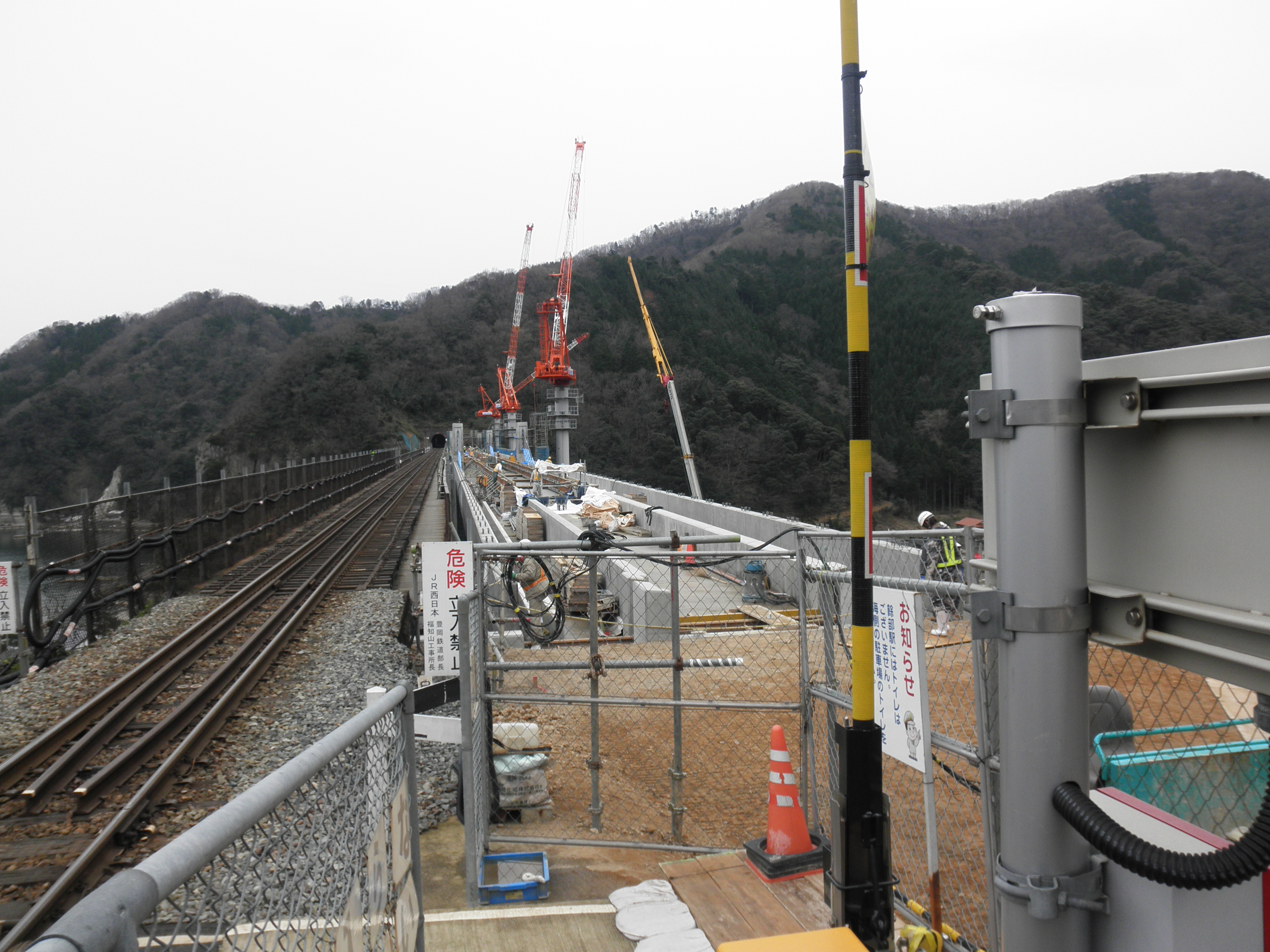
Construction of the new railway bridge, March 2010

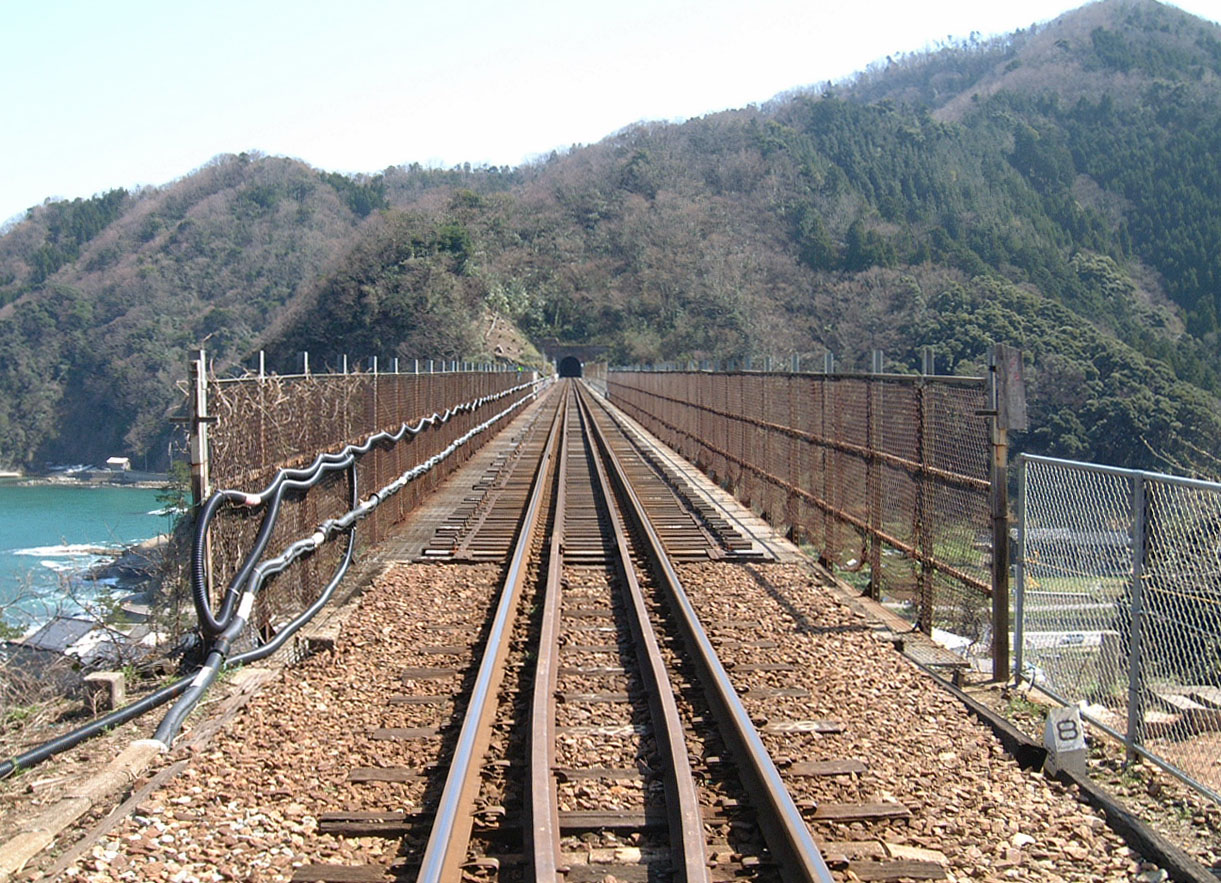
The old railway bridge, March 2008

== Passenger statistics ==
In fiscal 2016, the station was used by an average of 55 passengers daily.

== See also ==
- List of railway stations in Japan
