= Kami, Hyōgo (Mikata) =

Kami 香美町
- Town
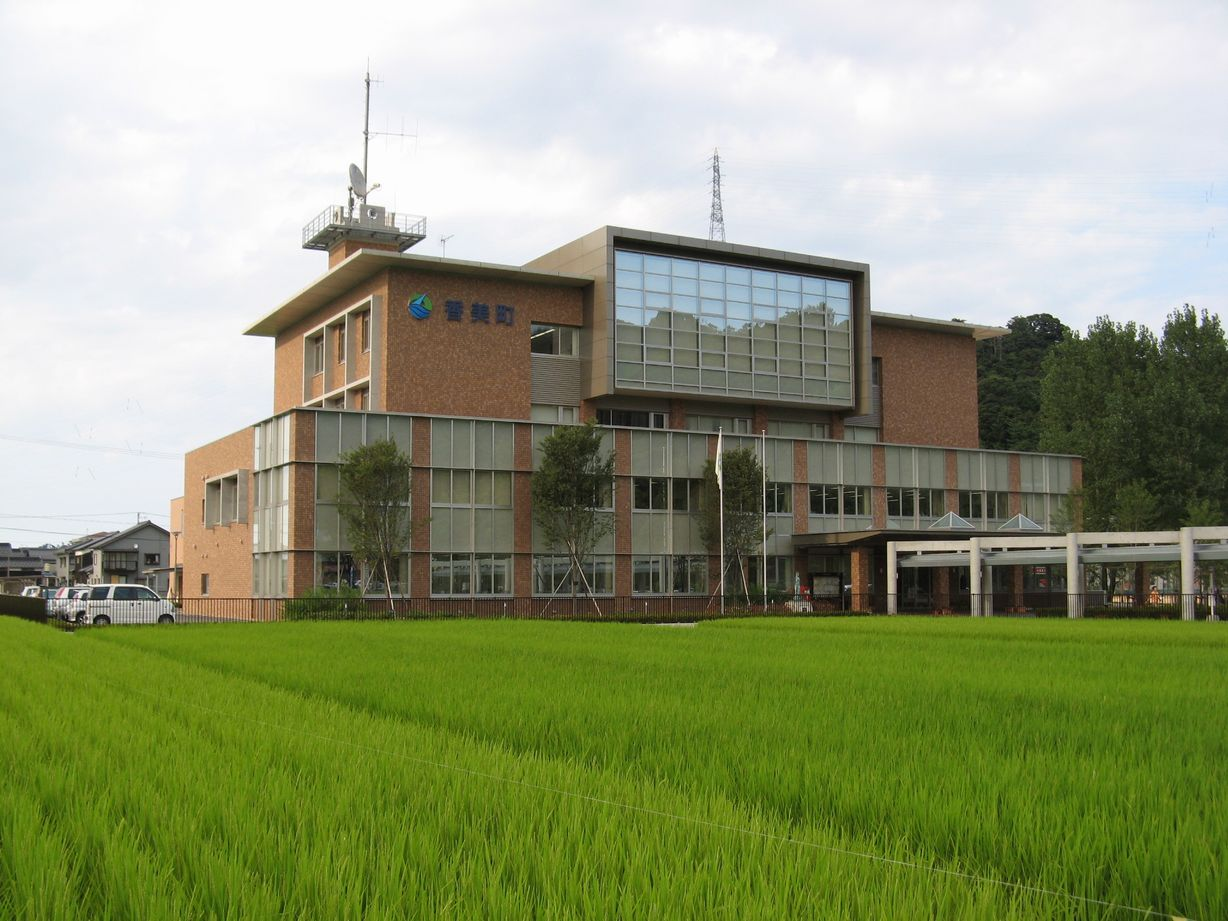
- Kami Town Hall

- Flag Chapter

- Location of Kami in Hyōgo Prefecture

- Location in Japan
- Coordinates: 35°38′N 134°38′E
- Country: Japan
- Region: Kansai
- Prefecture: Hyōgo
- District: Mikata

Government
  - Mayor: Hayato Hamagami

Area
  - Total: 368.77 km^{2} (142.38 sq mi)

Population (March 31, 2022)
  - Total: 16,256
  - Density: 44.082/km^{2} (114.17/sq mi)
- Time zone: UTC+09:00 (JST)
- City hall address: 1-870 Kasumi, Kasumi-ku, Kami-cho, Mikata-gun, Hyōgo-ken 669-6592
- Climate: Cfa
- Website: Official website
- Symbols
- Flower: Sakura
- Tree: Fagus crenata Castanopsis

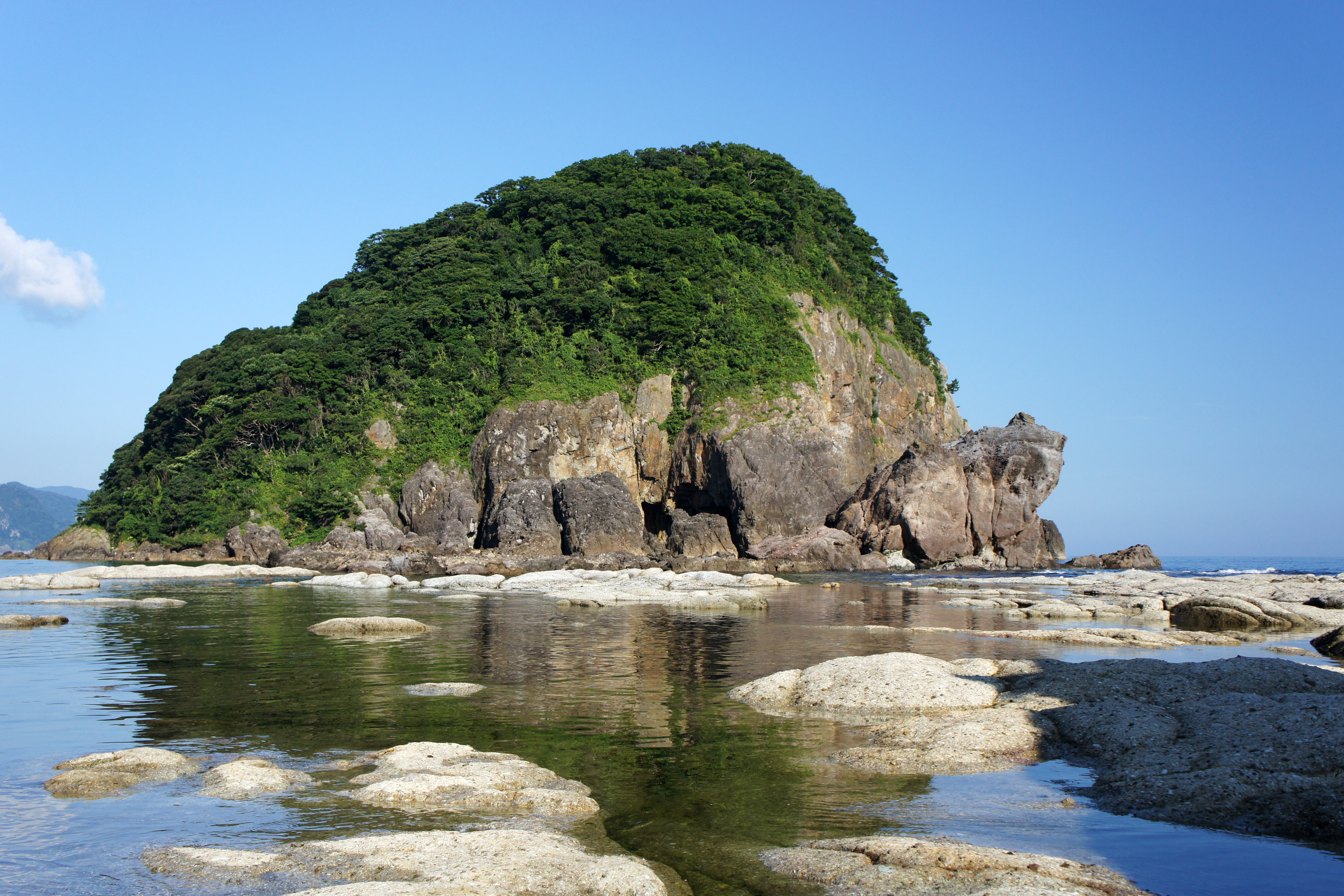
Kasumi Coast

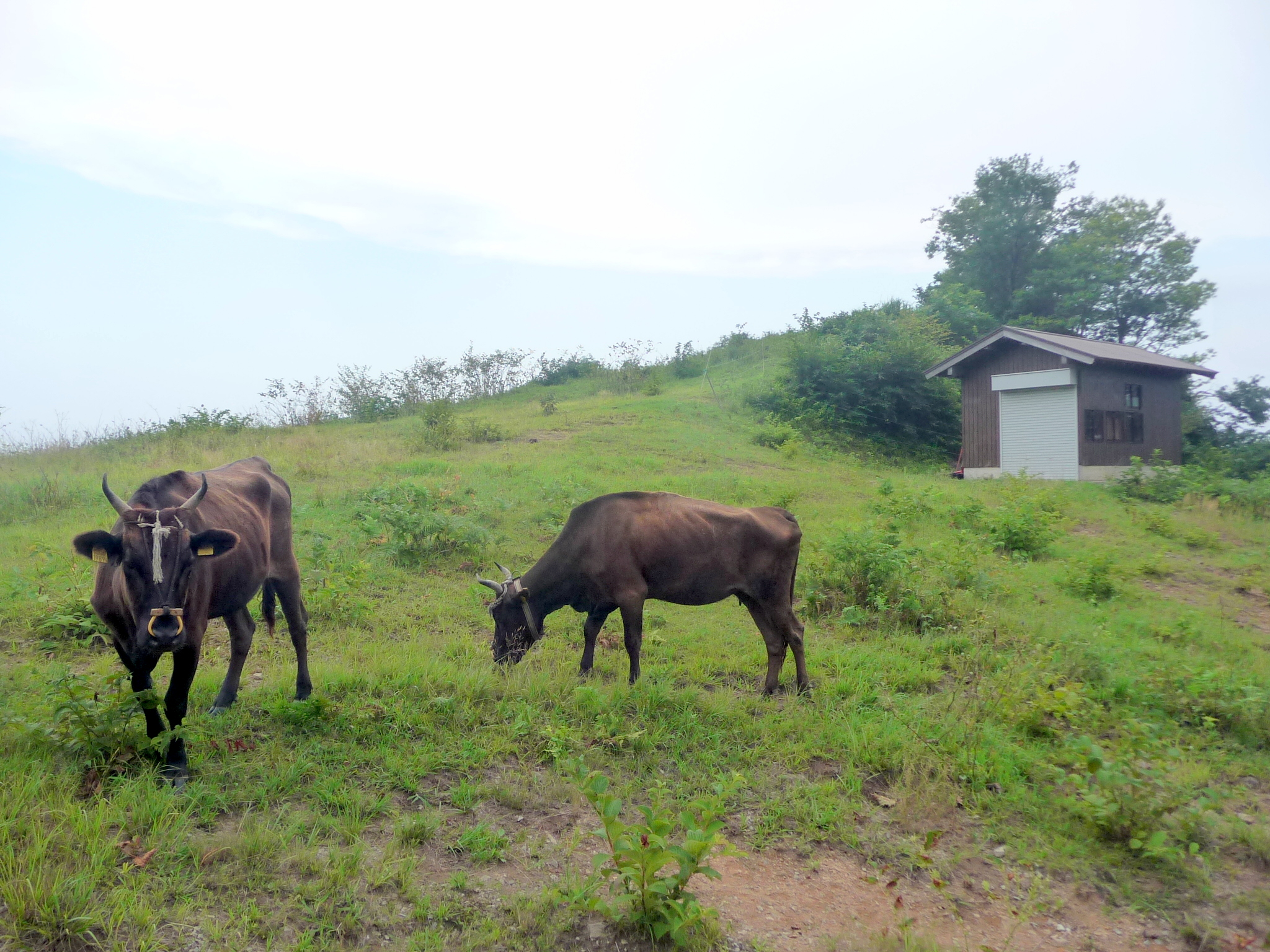
Tajima Cattle in Ojiro, Kami Town

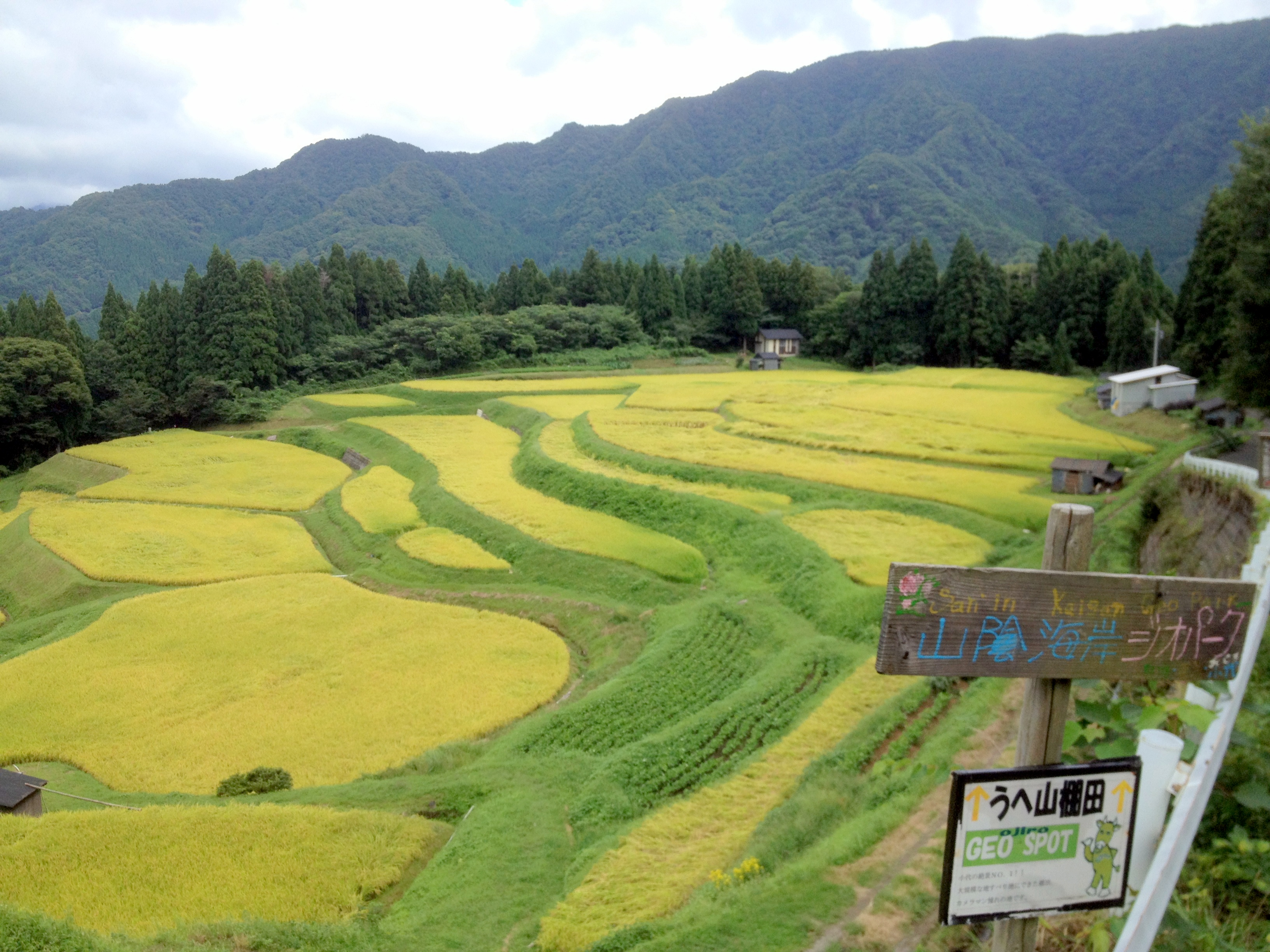
Rice Terraces of Ueyama in Ojiro, Kami Town

Kami (香美町, Kami-chō) is a town located in Mikata District, Hyōgo Prefecture, Japan. As of 31 March 2022, the town had an estimated population of 16,256 in 6368 households and a population density of 44 persons per km^{2}. The total area of the town is 368.77 square kilometres (142.38 sq mi). The Ojiro neighborhood of the town is designated as one of the Most Beautiful Villages in Japan. Kami is the birthplace of Tajiri-go, a Tajima Cattle who is the ancestor of more than 99.9% of Japanese Black wagyu.

== Geography ==
Kami is located in the northern part of Hyōgo Prefecture and the Kinki region, facing the Sea of Japan in the north. It lies entirely within the San'in Kaigan Geopark. In addition, the mountainous area in the south is within the borders of the Hyōnosen-Ushiroyama-Nagisan Quasi-National Park. The area is part of the snow country and is characterized by heavy accumulations of snow in winter.

=== Neighbouring municipalities ===
Hyōgo Prefecture

- Shin'onsen
- Toyooka
- Yabu

Tottori Prefecture

- Wakasa

=== Climate ===
Kami has a humid subtropical climate (Köppen climate classification Cfa) with hot summers and cool to cold winters. Precipitation is significantly higher in summer than in winter, though on the whole lower than most parts of Honshū, and there is no significant snowfall. The average annual temperature in Kami is 14.7 °C (58.5 °F). The average annual rainfall is 2,213.5 mm (87.15 in) with December as the wettest month. The temperatures are highest on average in August, at around 26.2 °C (79.2 °F), and lowest in January, at around 4.5 °C (40.1 °F). The highest temperature ever recorded in Kami was 38.1 °C (100.6 °F) on 7 August 2026; the coldest temperature ever recorded was −6.4 °C (20.5 °F) on 26 February 1981.

Climate data for Kasumi, Kami (1991−2020 normals, extremes 1976−present)
Month	Jan	Feb	Mar	Apr	May	Jun	Jul	Aug	Sep	Oct	Nov	Dec	Year
Record high °C (°F)	19.5 (67.1)	21.5 (70.7)	27.6 (81.7)	32.6 (90.7)	32.3 (90.1)	36.1 (97.0)	37.1 (98.8)	38.1 (100.6)	36.4 (97.5)	31.6 (88.9)	26.3 (79.3)	24.2 (75.6)	38.1 (100.6)
Mean daily maximum °C (°F)	7.8 (46.0)	8.4 (47.1)	11.7 (53.1)	17.1 (62.8)	21.9 (71.4)	24.6 (76.3)	28.8 (83.8)	30.3 (86.5)	26.3 (79.3)	21.3 (70.3)	16.1 (61.0)	10.7 (51.3)	18.8 (65.7)
Daily mean °C (°F)	4.5 (40.1)	4.7 (40.5)	7.5 (45.5)	12.5 (54.5)	17.2 (63.0)	20.9 (69.6)	25.1 (77.2)	26.2 (79.2)	22.4 (72.3)	17.1 (62.8)	11.9 (53.4)	7.0 (44.6)	14.8 (58.6)
Mean daily minimum °C (°F)	1.7 (35.1)	1.5 (34.7)	3.5 (38.3)	8.0 (46.4)	12.9 (55.2)	17.5 (63.5)	22.1 (71.8)	23.0 (73.4)	19.2 (66.6)	13.6 (56.5)	8.5 (47.3)	3.9 (39.0)	11.3 (52.3)
Record low °C (°F)	−6.0 (21.2)	−6.4 (20.5)	−4.4 (24.1)	−0.1 (31.8)	4.7 (40.5)	9.2 (48.6)	14.3 (57.7)	16.2 (61.2)	10.1 (50.2)	3.5 (38.3)	0.9 (33.6)	−4.4 (24.1)	−6.4 (20.5)
Average precipitation mm (inches)	260.4 (10.25)	163.7 (6.44)	154.2 (6.07)	104.5 (4.11)	112.0 (4.41)	145.3 (5.72)	183.8 (7.24)	153.1 (6.03)	251.4 (9.90)	172.3 (6.78)	204.4 (8.05)	295.7 (11.64)	2,213.5 (87.15)
Average snowfall cm (inches)	87 (34)	63 (25)	11 (4.3)	0 (0)	0 (0)	0 (0)	0 (0)	0 (0)	0 (0)	0 (0)	0 (0)	37 (15)	202 (80)
Average precipitation days (≥ 1.0 mm)	22.6	17.0	15.3	11.4	10.5	10.8	12.2	9.7	12.8	12.3	16.3	21.1	172
Average snowy days (≥ 3 cm)	8.0	5.8	1.1	0	0	0	0	0	0	0	0	3.3	18.2
Mean monthly sunshine hours	56.9	74.3	132.6	183.7	204.0	151.1	160.9	202.8	138.8	134.0	97.2	68.5	1,603.9
Source: Japan Meteorological Agency

== Demographics ==
Per Japanese census data, the population of Kami in 2020 is 16,064 people. Kami has been conducting censuses since 1920.

Historical population
Year	Pop.	±%
1920	31,838	—
1925	31,607	−0.7%
1930	31,646	+0.1%
1935	31,292	−1.1%
1940	31,627	+1.1%
1945	34,890	+10.3%
1950	35,414	+1.5%
1955	34,855	−1.6%
1960	33,745	−3.2%
1965	31,096	−7.9%
1970	28,321	−8.9%
1975	27,571	−2.6%
1980	26,694	−3.2%
1985	25,964	−2.7%
1990	25,136	−3.2%
1995	24,298	−3.3%
2000	23,271	−4.2%
2005	21,439	−7.9%
2010	19,697	−8.1%
2015	18,070	−8.3%
2020	16,064	−11.1%
Kami population statistics

== History ==
The area of the modern town of Kami was within ancient Tajima Province.In the Edo Period, it was divided between Izushi Domain, Toyooka Domain and tenryo territory under direct administration of the Tokugawa shogunate. Following the Meiji restoration, the village of Kasumi (香住) was created within Mikami District, which later became Kinosaki District, Hyōgo. It was raised to town status on October 1, 1925. The town of Kami was formed by the merger of Kasumi with the towns of Mikata and Muraoka, both from Mikata District on April 1, 2005.

== Government ==
Kami has a mayor-council form of government with a directly elected mayor and a unicameral town council of 16 members. Kami, together with the town of Shin'onsen contributes one member to the Hyogo Prefectural Assembly. In terms of national politics, the town is part of Hyōgo 5th district of the lower house of the Diet of Japan.

== Economy ==
Kami has a mixed economy of commercial fishing and agriculture. It is one of then leading fishing ports for snow crab. The town is known for its production of "Tajima beef".

== Education ==
Kami has ten public elementary schools and three public middle schools operated by the town government and two public high schools operated by the Hyōgo Prefectural Department of Education. The prefecture also operates a special education school for the handicapped.

== Transportation ==
=== Railway ===
JR West – San'in Main Line

- Satsu - Shibayama - Kasumi - Yoroi -Amarube

=== Highway ===
- National Route 9
- National Route 178
- National Route 482

== Sister cities ==
- Amagasaki, Hyogo Prefecture, Japan
- Kadoma, Osaka Prefecture, Japan
- Suita, Osaka Prefecture, Japan

== Places, local attractions, and historic sites ==
- Amarube Viaduct
- Mount Hachibuse (鉢伏山) (1,221 metres), a sacred mountain in the Oomoto religion
- San'in Kaigan Geopark
- Tajima Plateau Botanical Gardens
- Kasumi Fishing Port (香住漁港)

== In popular culture ==
- The place around Kasumi Fishing Port (香住漁港) was used as the model for the setting of AIR and its 2005 homonymous anime adaptation.
