= Muraoka, Hyōgo =

Dissolved municipality in Hyōgo prefecture, Japan

Muraoka (村岡町, Muraoka-chō) was a town located in Mikata District, Hyōgo, Japan.

As of 2003, the town had an estimated population of 6,370 and a density of 38.45 persons per km^{2}. The total area was 165.66 km^{2}.

On April 1, 2005, Muraoka, along with the town of Kasumi (from Kinosaki District), and the town of Mikata (also from Mikata District), was merged to create the town of Kami (in Mikata District), and no longer exists as an independent municipality. The portion of Kami that was Muraoka is now known as Muraoka-ku, or Muraoka Ward.
