= Yoroi Station =

Railway station in Kami, Hyōgo Prefecture, Japan

Yoroi Station 鎧駅
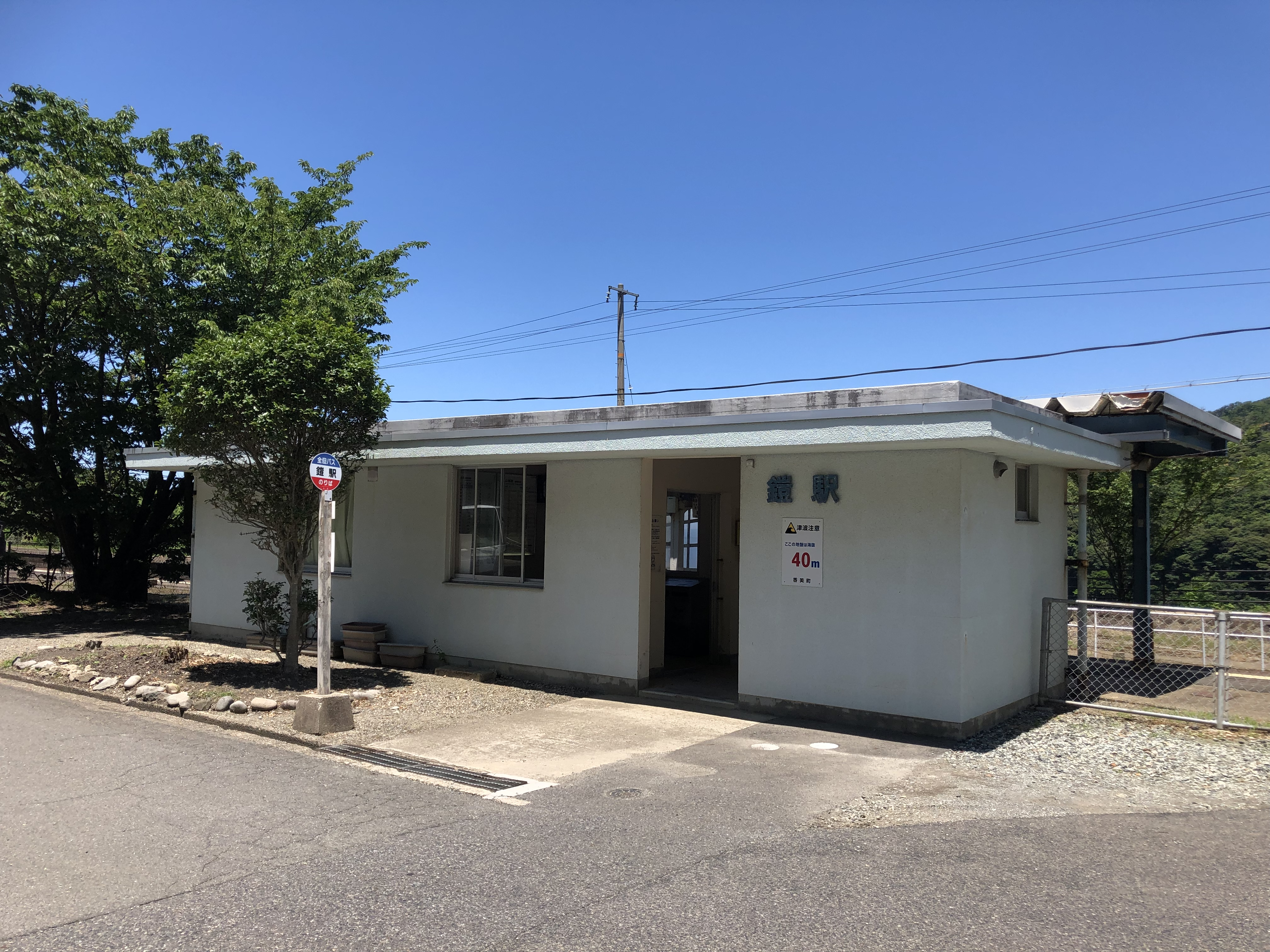
- Yoroi Station, June 2019

General information
- Location: Kasumiku Yoroi, Kami Town, Mikata District, Hyōgo Prefecture 669-6672; Japan
- Coordinates: 35.6514°N 134.5751°E
- Operator: JR West
- Line: San'in Main Line
- Distance: 185.4 km (115.2 miles) from Kyoto
- Platforms: 1 side platform
- Tracks: 1
- Connections: Bus stop

Construction
- Structure type: At grade

Other information
- Status: Unstaffed
- Website: Official website

History
- Opened: 1 March 1912; 114 years ago

Passengers
- FY2016: 8 daily

Services
| Preceding station | JR West | Following station |
|---|---|---|
| Amarube towards Yonago | San'in Line | Kasumi towards Kinosaki-Onsen |
Location
- Location within Hyōgo Prefecture Location within Kansai region Location within Japan

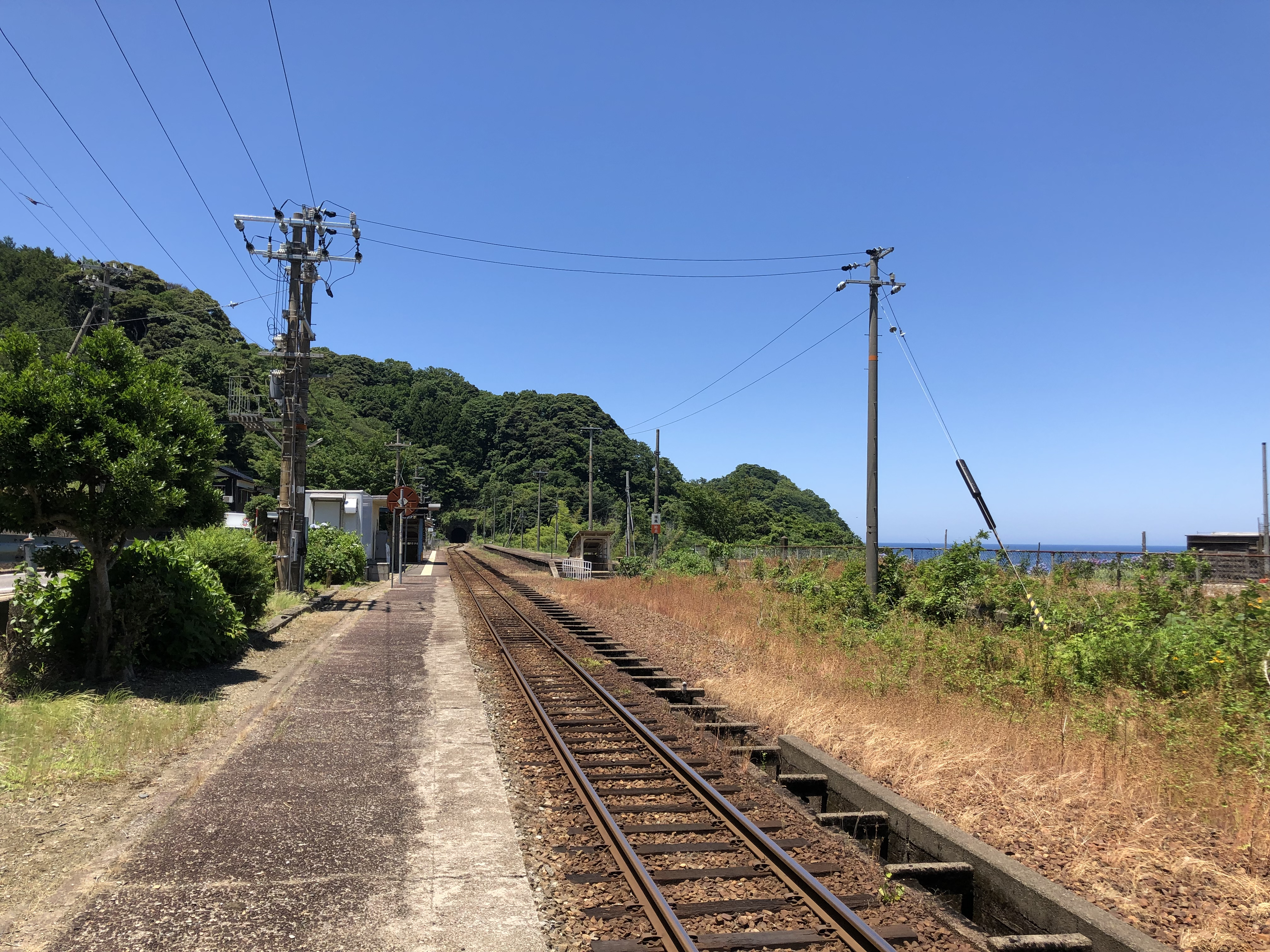
West Japan Railway Company Yoroi Station premises (after bar line construction)

Yoroi Station (鎧駅, Yoroi-eki) is a passenger railway station located in the town of Kami, Mikata District, Hyōgo, Japan, operated by West Japan Railway Company (JR West). It opened on March 1, 1912.

== Lines ==
Yoroi Station is served by the San'in Main Line, and is located 185.4 kilometers from the terminus of the line at Kyoto.

== Station layout ==
The station consists of one ground-level side platform serving a single bi-directional track. The station is unattended.

== Passenger statistics ==
In fiscal 2016, the station was used by an average of 8 passengers daily

== Gallery ==
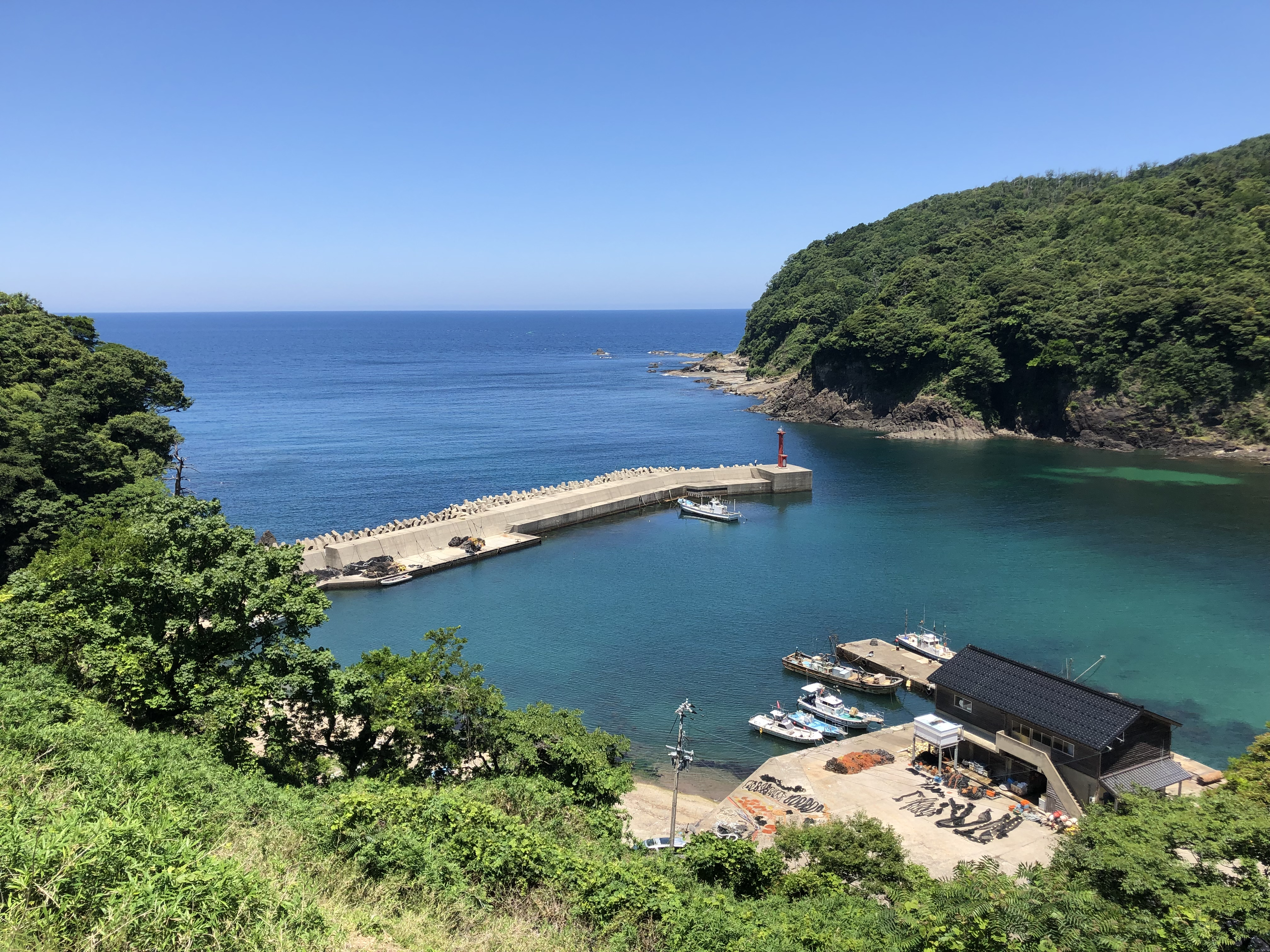
View of the seaside from the station, June 2019

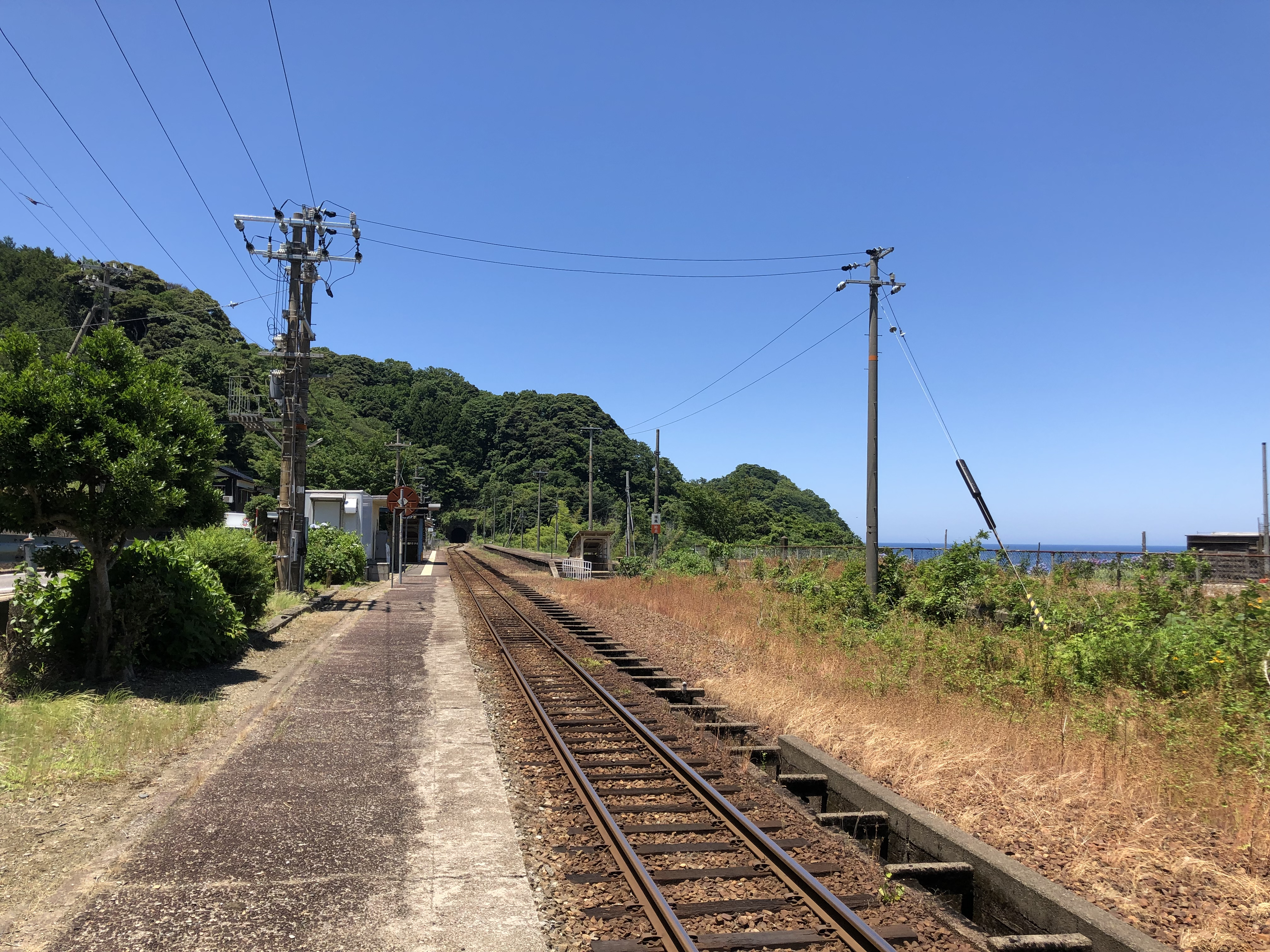
Station structure, June 2019

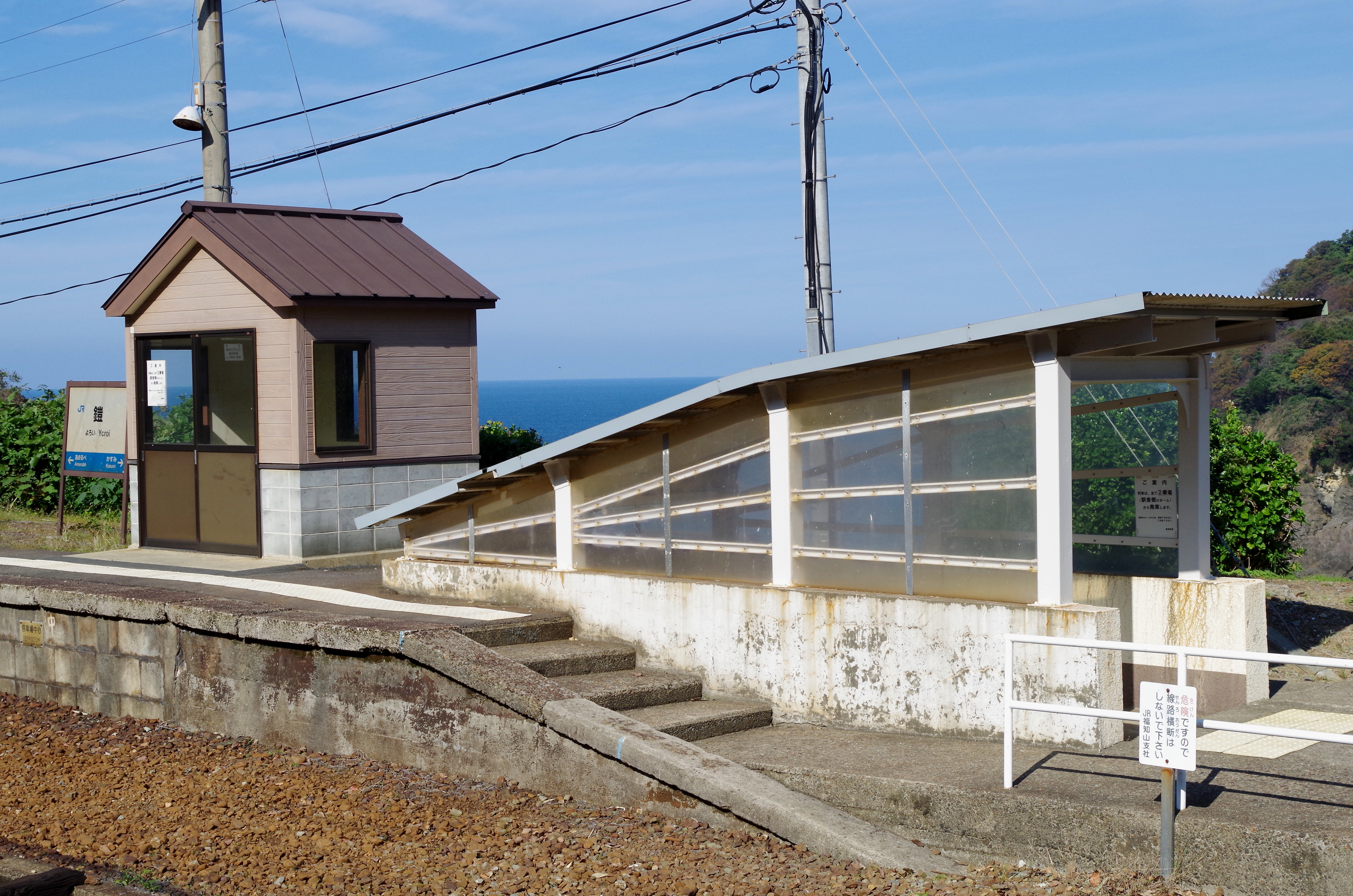
Platform 1 and entrance to station underpass, October 2013

== See also ==
- List of railway stations in Japan
