= Mikata District, Hyōgo =

District in Hyōgo Prefecture, Japan

Coordinates: 35.567°N 134.551°E

Mikata District in Hyōgo Prefecture

Mikata (美方郡, Mikata-gun) is a district located in Hyōgo Prefecture, Japan.

As of the April 1, 2005 merger (but using 2003 population statistics), the district has an estimated population of 40,084 and a density of 66 persons per km^{2}. The total area is 610.02 km^{2}.

== Towns and villages ==
- Kami
- Shin'onsen

== Mergers ==
- On April 1, 2005 the towns of Mikata and Muraoka merged with the town of Kasumi, from Kinosaki District, to form the new town of Kami.
- On October 1, 2005 the towns of Hamasaka and Onsen merged to form the town of Shin'onsen.

== Points of interest ==
- Tajima Plateau Botanical Gardens
- Antaiji Zen monastery
