= Kōbe Station (Hyogo) =

Railway station in Kobe, Japan

Kobe Station 神戸駅
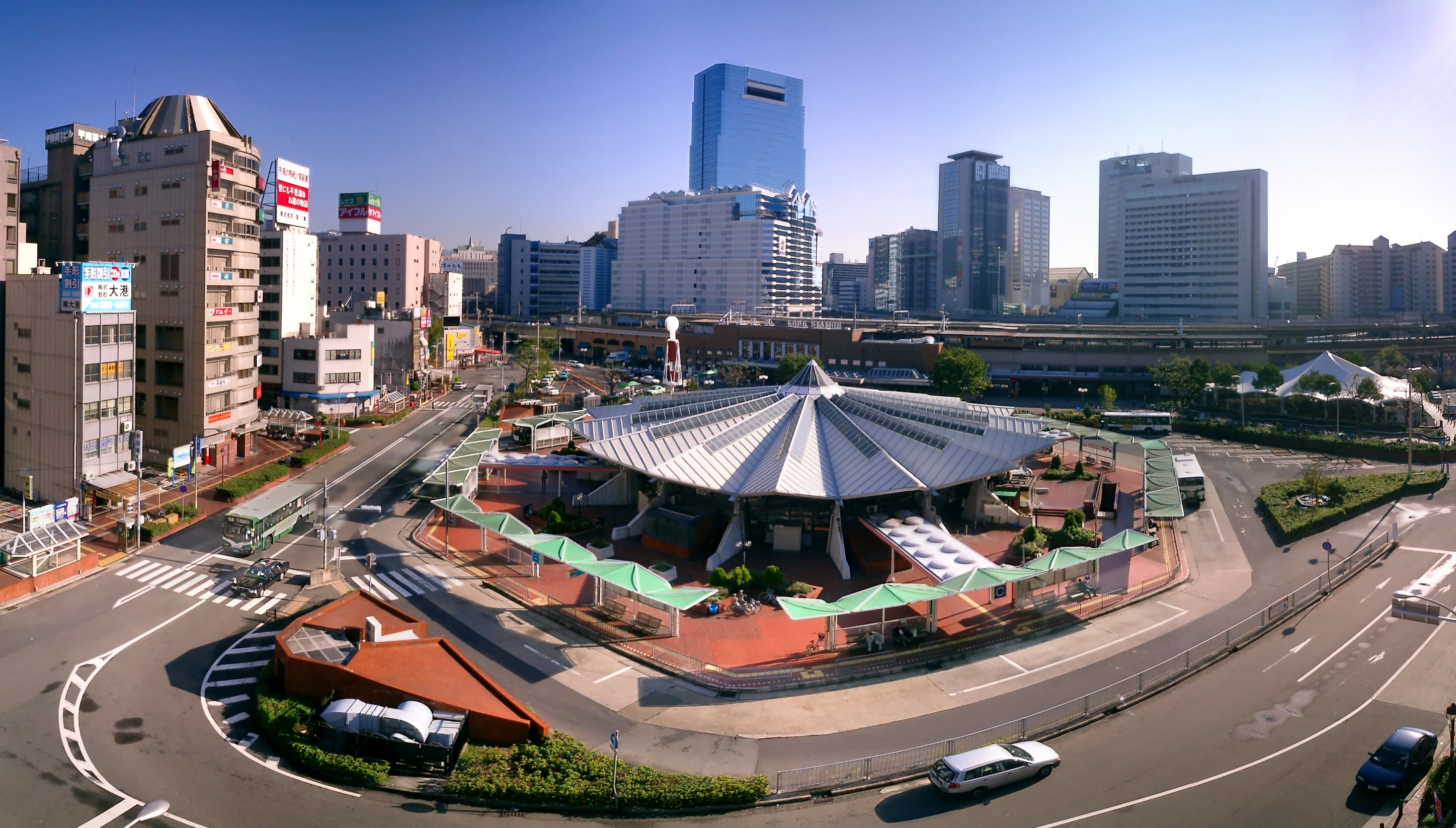
- Panoramic view of the station from the north

General information
- Location: 3-1-1 Aioichō, Chūō, Kobe, Hyōgo （神戸市中央区相生町三丁目1-1） Japan
- Coordinates: 34°40′46″N 135°10′41″E
- Operator: JR West
- Lines: Tokaido Main Line; Sanyo Main Line
- Connections: Bus terminal

Construction
- Structure type: Elevated
- Accessible: Yes

Other information
- Station code: JR-A63

History
- Opened: 11 May 1874

Passengers
- FY 2023: 103,098 daily
Location

Kobe Station (神戸駅, Kōbe-eki) is a railway station in Chūō-ku, Kobe, Japan, operated by West Japan Railway Company (JR West). Although Kobe Station is the namesake of the city of Kobe, Kobe City Hall and the commercial center of Kobe is closer to Kobe-Sannomiya Station.

== Lines ==
The station technically forms the end point of the Tokaido Main Line and the starting of the Sanyo Main Line. This fact is barely discernible in current practice because only a few trains originate or terminate at Kobe; as a result, the station is more commonly perceived as being in the midsection of the JR Kobe Line, an alternative name for the section of the Tokaido and Sanyo lines between Osaka and Himeji.

== Layout ==
The station has one side platform and two island platforms serving five elevated tracks.

=== Platforms ===
1	■ JR Kōbe Line	Rapid service trains for Sannomiya, Amagasaki and Osaka on weekday mornings
2	■ JR Kōbe Line	Special rapid service trains and Limited Express Hamakaze (also some rapid services) for Sannomiya, Amagasaki and Osaka
3	■ JR Kōbe Line	Local trains and rapid service for Sannomiya, Amagasaki, and Osaka
4	■ JR Kōbe Line	Local trains and rapid service for Nishi-Akashi and Himeji
5	■ JR Kōbe Line	Special rapid service (also some rapid services) for Nishi-Akashi and Himeji ■Limited Express Hamakaze for Kinosaki-Onsen, Kasumi, Hamasaka, and Tottori ■Commuter Limited Express Rakuraku Harima for Nishi-Akashi and Himeji

== Adjacent stations ==
«	Service	»
Tokaido/Sanyo Line (JR Kobe Line)
Sannomiya (JR-A61)	West Express Ginga (San'yo Route)	Nishi-Akashi (JR-A74)
Sannomiya (JR-A61)	West Express Ginga (San'in Route)	Nishi-Akashi (JR-A74) (Izumoshi bound trains); Bitchu-Takahashi (JR-V12) (Kyōto bound trains)
Sannomiya (JR-A61)	Limited Express Super Hakuto (No. 13 only); Commuter Limited Express Rakuraku Harima; Limited Express Hamakaze	Akashi (JR-A73)
Sannomiya (JR-A61)	Special Rapid Service	Akashi (JR-A73)
Motomachi (JR-A62)	Rapid Service	Hyōgo (JR-A64)
Motomachi (JR-A62)	Local	Hyōgo (JR-A64)

== History ==
Kobe Station opened on 11 May 1874. With the privatization of JNR on 1 April 1987, the station came under the control of JR West.

Station numbering was introduced in March 2018 with Kobe being assigned station number JR-A63.

== Surrounding area ==
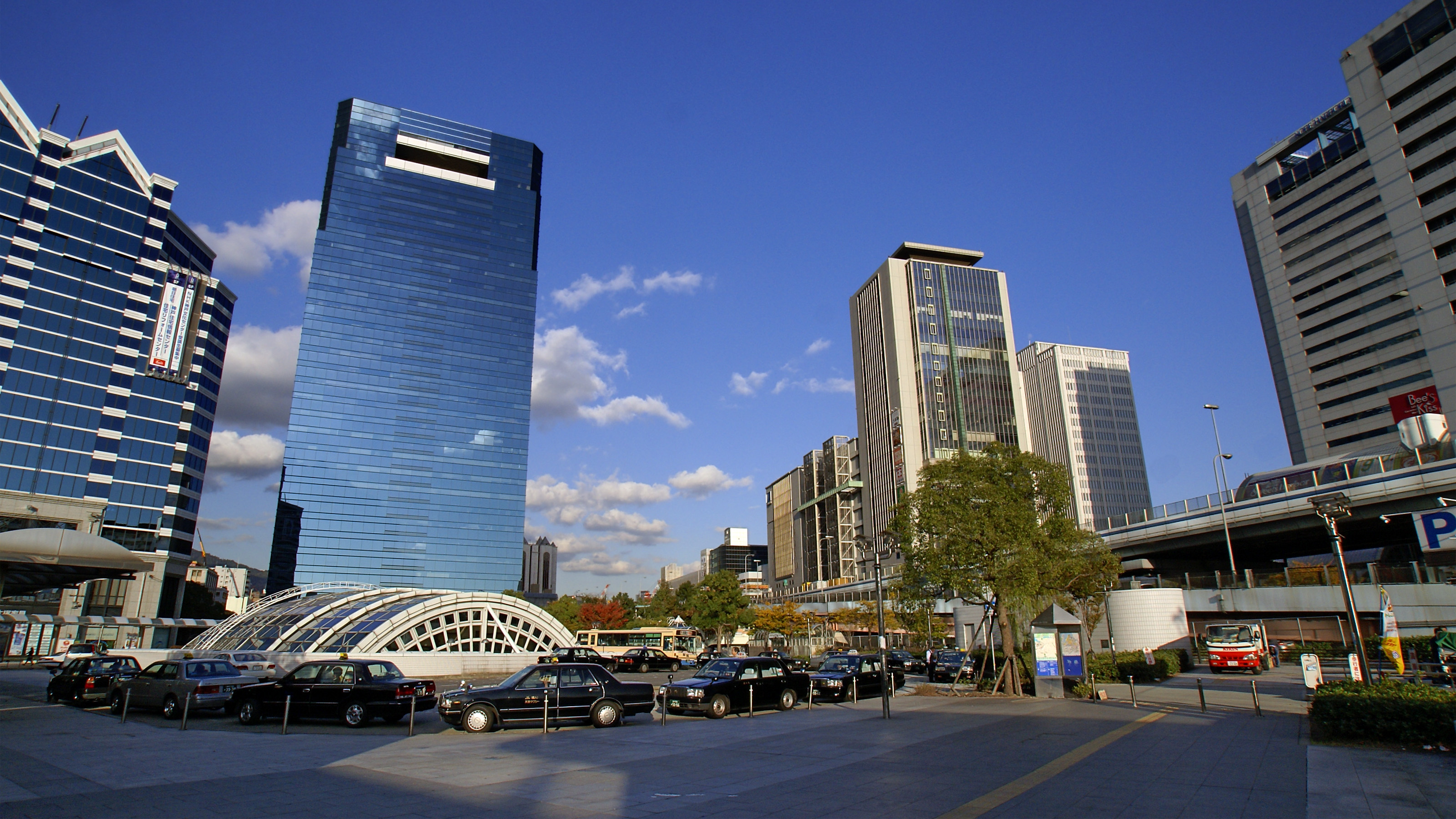
In front of the station

The area to the south of the station was previously a freight yard, but was redeveloped and became a waterfront commercial center called Harborland.

Escalators and underground pathways link pedestrian traffic from the above-ground Kobe Station with the relatively close underground stations of Kosoku Kobe on the Kobe Rapid Railway and Harborland on the Kaigan Line of the Kobe Municipal Subway.

== In popular culture ==
- The station is referred to in GaGaGa SP's song of the same name, 「神戸駅」(Kōbe-eki).

== See also ==
- List of railway stations in Japan
