= Akashi Station =

Railway station in Akashi, Hyōgo Prefecture, Japan

Akashi Station 明石駅
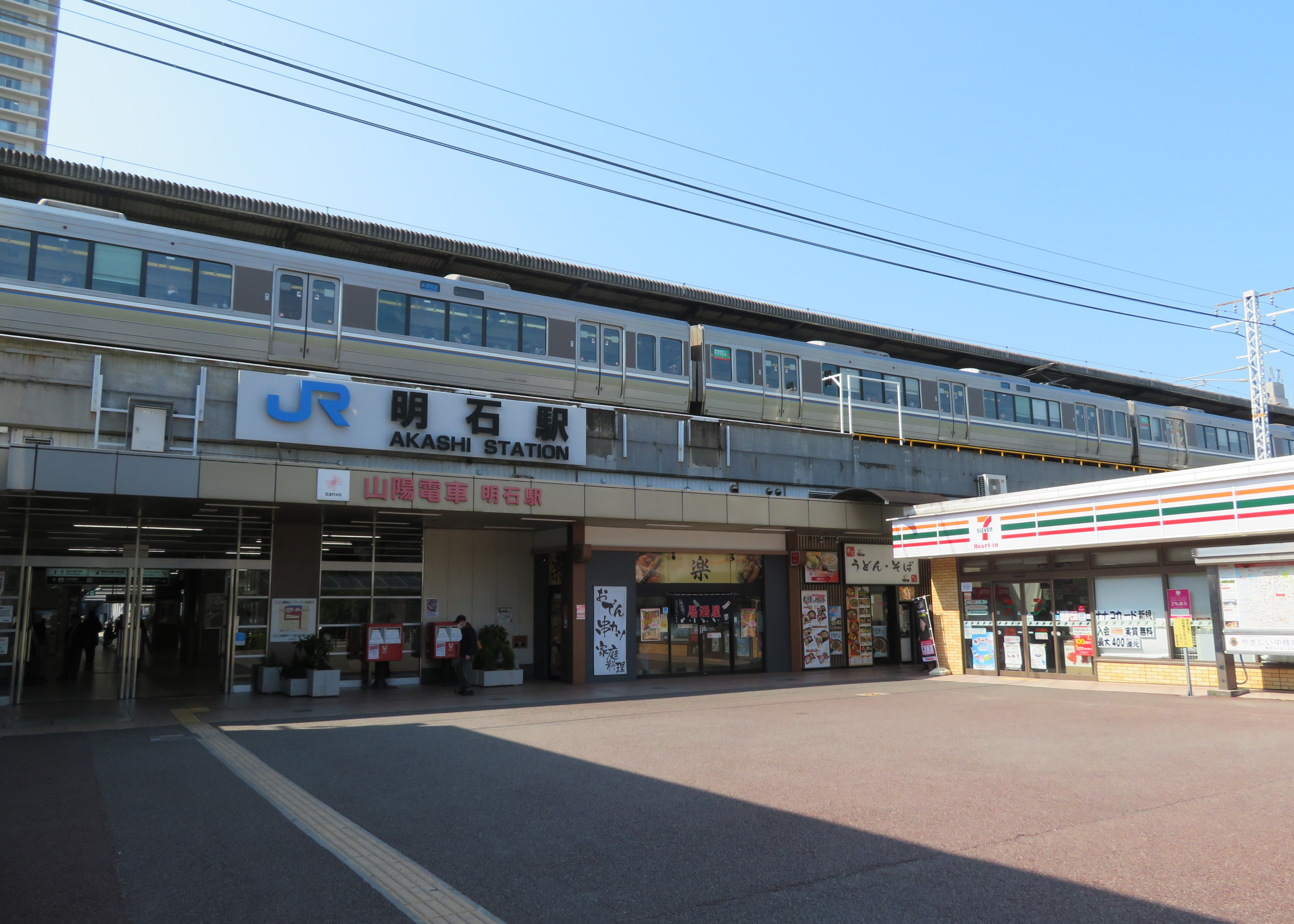
- Akashi Station, April 2020

General information
- Location: 1-1-23 Ōakashi-chō, Akashi-shi, Hyōgo-ken; Japan
- Coordinates: 34°38′57″N 134°59′31″E
- Owner: West Japan Railway Company
- Operator: West Japan Railway Company
- Line: San'yō Main Line
- Distance: 19.4 km (12.1 miles) from Kobe
- Platforms: 2 island platforms
- Tracks: 4
- Connections: Bus stop

Construction
- Structure type: Elevated
- Accessible: Yes

Other information
- Status: Staffed (Midori no Madoguchi)
- Station code: JR-A73
- Website: Official website

History
- Opened: 1 November 1888

Passengers
- FY2019: 53,486 daily
Location
- Location within Hyōgo Prefecture Location within Japan

Akashi Station (明石駅, Akashi-eki) is a passenger railway station located in the city of Akashi, Hyōgo Prefecture, Japan, operated by the West Japan Railway Company (JR West).

== Lines ==
Akashi Station is served by the JR San'yō Main Line, and is located 19.4 kilometers from the terminus of the line at Kobe and 52.52 kilometers from Osaka.

== Station layout ==
The station consists of two elevated island platforms with the station building underneath. Platforms 1 and 2 are for electrified train service and Platform 3 and 4 are for non-electrified trains. The station has a Midori no Madoguchi staffed ticket office.

=== Platforms ===
1	■ JR Kobe Line	local trains for Nishi-Akashi and Himeji
2	■ JR Kobe Line	local trains and rapid services for Sannomiya, Amagasaki and Osaka
3	■ JR Kobe Line	special rapid services and part of local trains for Nishi-Akashi and Himeji ■ Limited Express Hamakaze for Kinosaki-Onsen, Kasumi, Hamasaka, and Tottori ■ Commuter Limited Express Rakuraku Harima for Nishi-Akashi and Himeji ■ Limited Express "Super Hakuto" for Chizu, Tottori and Kurayoshi
4	■ JR Kobe Line	limited express trains, special rapid services and part of rapid services for Sannomiya, Amagasaki and Osaka

== Adjacent stations ==
«	Service	»
JR West
Sanyō Main Line (JR Kobe Line)
Sannomiya (JR-A61); Kōbe (JR-A63) (No. 13 only)	Limited Express Super Hakuto	Himeji (JR-A85); Nishi-Akashi (JR-A74) (No. 13 only)
Kōbe (JR-A63)	Limited Express Hamakaze	Himeji (JR-A85); Nishi-Akashi (JR-A74) (No. 5 only)
Kōbe (JR-A63)	Commuter Limited Express Rakuraku Harima	Nishi-Akashi (JR-A74)
Kōbe (JR-A63)	Special Rapid Service	Nishi-Akashi (JR-A74)
Hyōgo (JR-A64)	Rapid Service (on the express track)	Nishi-Akashi (JR-A74)
Maiko (JR-A71)	Rapid Service (on the transit track)	Nishi-Akashi (JR-A74)
Asagiri (JR-A72)	Local	Nishi-Akashi (JR-A74)

== History ==
Akashi Station opened on 1 November 1888. With the privatization of the Japan National Railways (JNR) on 1 April 1987, the station came under the aegis of the West Japan Railway Company.

Station numbering was introduced in March 2018 with Akashi being assigned station number JR-A73.

== Passenger statistics ==
In fiscal 2019, the station was used by an average of 53,486 passengers daily

== Surrounding area ==
- Sanyo Akashi Station
- Akashi Castle
- Akashi Municipal Cultural Museum
- Kobe University Akashi Junior High School, Akashi Elementary

== See also ==
- List of railway stations in Japan
