= Fukube Station =

Railway station in Tottori, Tottori Prefecture, Japan

Fukube Station 福部駅
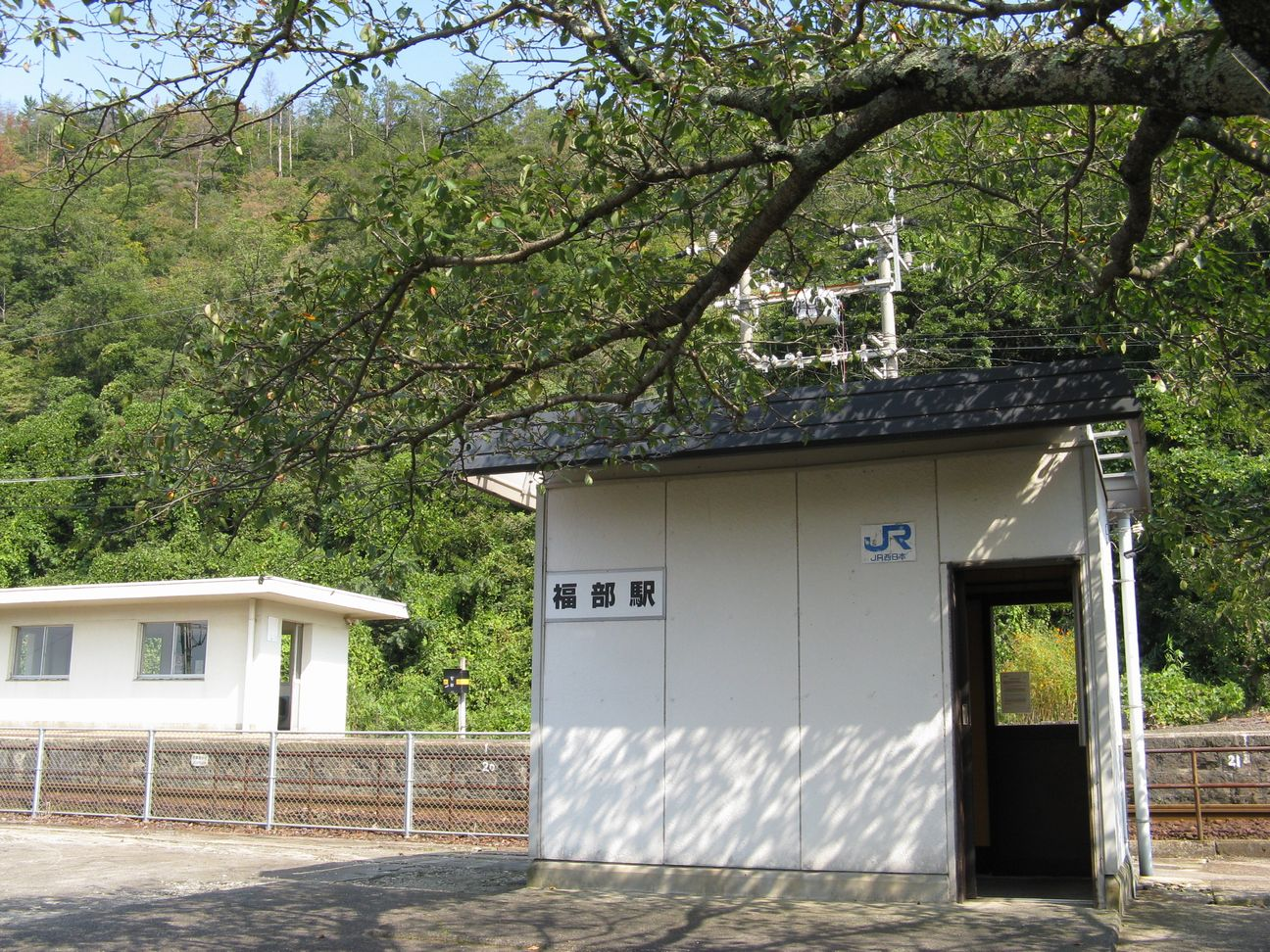
- Fukube Station

General information
- Location: 398 Kuriya, Fukubecho, Tottori-shi, Tottori-ken689-0111; Japan
- Coordinates: 35.5453°N 134.2874°E
- Operator: JR West
- Line: San'in Main Line
- Distance: 219.1 km (136.1 miles) from Kyoto
- Platforms: 1 island platform
- Tracks: 2

Construction
- Structure type: At grade

Other information
- Status: Unstaffed
- Website: Official website

History
- Opened: 10 October 1910
- Former names: Shiomi Station (to 1949)

Passengers
- 2020: 63 daily

Services
Preceding station	JR West	Following station
Tottori towards Yonago	San'in Line	Ōiwa towards Kinosaki-Onsen
Location
- Location within Tottori Prefecture Location within Japan

Fukube Station (福部駅, Fukube-eki) is a passenger railway station located in the city of Tottori, Tottori Prefecture, Japan. It is operated by the West Japan Railway Company (JR West).

== Lines ==
Fukube Station is served by the San'in Main Line, and is located 219.1 kilometers from the terminus of the line at Kyoto. Only local trains stop at this station.

== Station layout ==
The station consists of one ground-level island platform connected by a level crossing to the station building. The station is unattended.

=== Platforms ===
1	■ San'in Main Line	for Hamasaka and Toyooka
2	■ San'in Main Line	for Tottori and Yonago

== History ==
Fukube Station opened on October 10, 1910, as Shiomi Station (塩見駅). It was renamed on March 1, 1949. With the privatization of the Japan National Railways (JNR) on April 1, 1987, the station came under the aegis of the West Japan Railway Company.

== Passenger statistics ==
In fiscal 2020, the station was used by an average of 63 passengers daily.

== See also ==
- List of railway stations in Japan
