= Satsu Station =

Railway station in Kami, Hyōgo Prefecture, Japan

Satsu Station 佐津駅
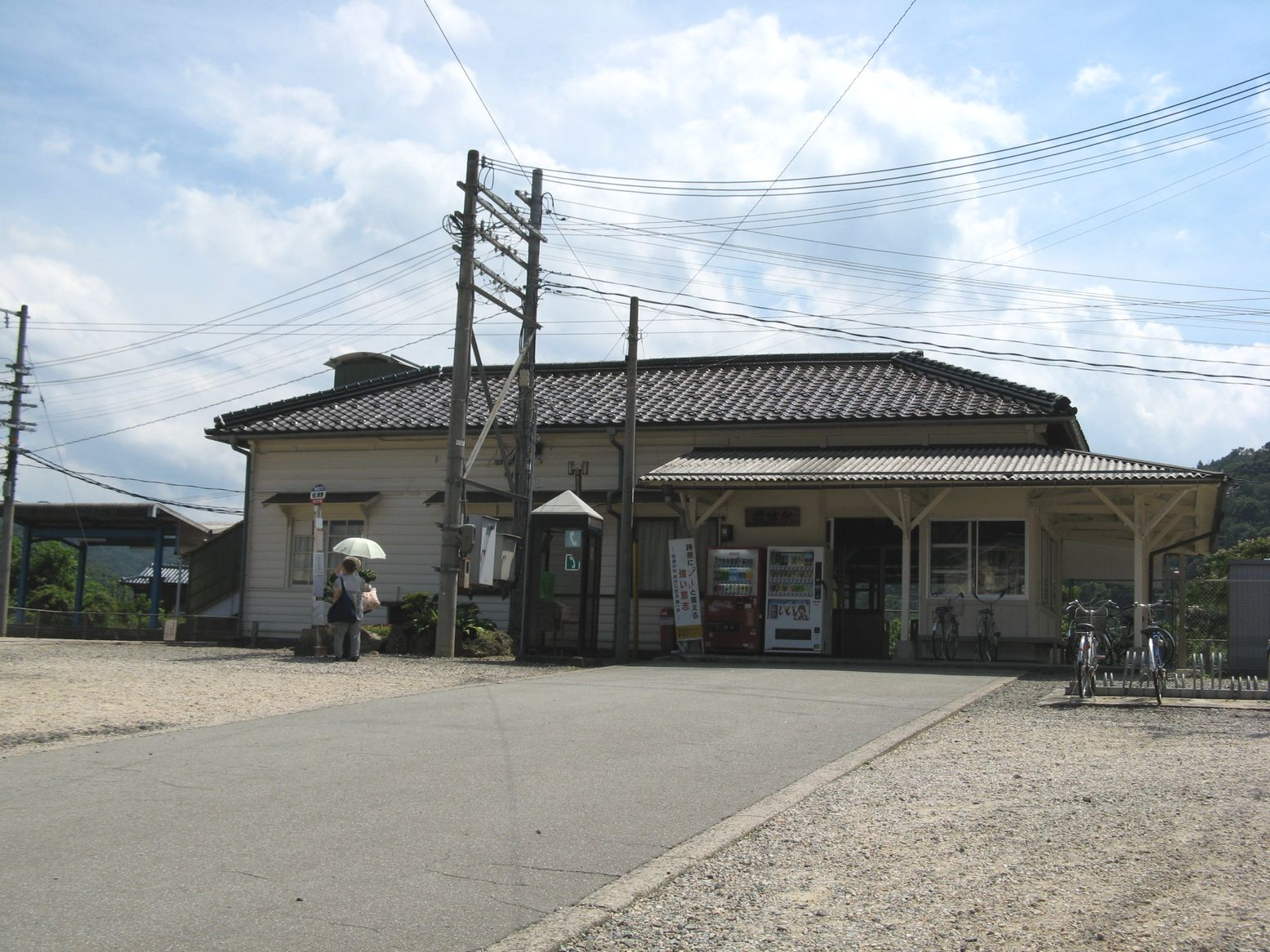
- Satsu Station, August 2007

General information
- Location: Kasumiku Munagaki, Kami-machi, Mikata-gun, Hyōgo-ken 669-6401; Japan
- Coordinates: 35.6533°N 134.6857°E
- Owner: West Japan Railway Company
- Operator: West Japan Railway Company
- Line: San'in Main Line
- Distance: 173.4 km (107.7 miles) from Kyoto
- Platforms: 1 island platform
- Connections: Bus stop

Other information
- Status: Unstaffed
- Website: Official website

History
- Opened: 25 October 1911

Passengers
- FY 2023: 128 daily
Location
- Location within Hyōgo Prefecture Location within Japan

Satsu Station (佐津駅, Satsu-eki) is a passenger railway station located in the town of Kami, Mikata District, Hyōgo, Japan, operated by West Japan Railway Company (JR West).

== Lines ==
Satsu Station is served by the San'in Main Line, and is located 173.4 kilometers from the terminus of the line at Kyoto.

== Station layout ==
The station consists of one ground-level island platform connected to the station building by a footbridge. The station is unattended.

=== Platforms ===
1	■ San'in Main Line	for Kinosaki Onsen and Toyooka
2	■ San'in Main Line	for Hamasaka and Tottori

== Adjacent stations ==
«	Service	»
West Japan Railway Company (JR West) San'in Main Line
Takeno	Limited Express Hamakaze (Winter only)	Kasumi
Takeno	Local	Shibayama

== History ==
Satsu Station opened on October 25, 1911.

== Passenger statistics ==
In fiscal 2016, the station was used by an average of 118 passengers daily.

== Surrounding area ==
- Satsu Post Office
- Satsu onsen

== See also ==
- List of railway stations in Japan
