= Takeno Station =

Railway station in Toyooka, Hyōgo Prefecture, Japan

Takeno Station 竹野駅
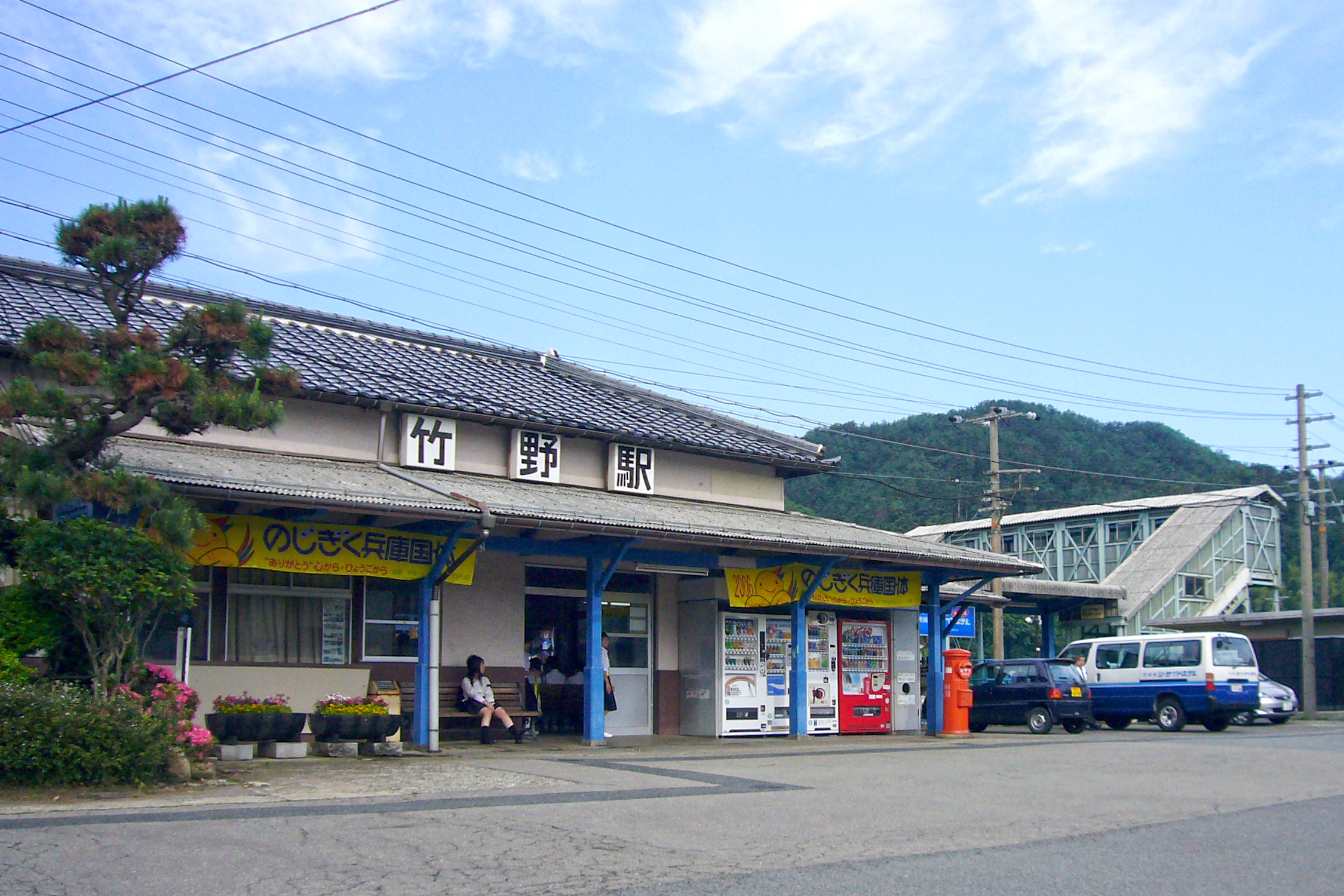
- Takeno Station, June 2006

General information
- Location: Takenocho Kusakai, Toyooka-shi, Hyōgo-ken 669-6215; Japan
- Coordinates: 35.6498°N 134.7565°E
- Owner: West Japan Railway Company
- Operator: West Japan Railway Company
- Line: San'in Main Line
- Distance: 166.0 km (103.1 miles) from Kyoto
- Platforms: 1 side + 1 island platform
- Connections: Bus stop

Other information
- Status: Staffed
- Website: Official website

History
- Opened: 25 October 1911

Passengers
- FY 2023: 340 daily
Location
- Location within Hyōgo Prefecture Location within Japan

Takeno Station (竹野駅, Takeno-eki) is a passenger railway station located in the city of Toyooka, Hyōgo Prefecture, Japan, operated by West Japan Railway Company (JR West).

== Lines ==
Takeno Station is served by the San'in Main Line, and is located 166.0 kilometers from the terminus of the line at Kyoto.

== Station layout ==
The station consists of one ground-level side platform and one ground-level island platform connected by a footbridge. The station is staffed. Although the rails remain in place, one side of the island platform is not in use, and is fenced off.

=== Platforms ===
1	■ San'in Main Line	for Kinosaki Onsen and Toyooka
2	■ San'in Main Line	for Hamasaka and Tottori

== Adjacent stations ==
«	Service	»
West Japan Railway Company (JR West) Sanin Main Line
Kinosaki-Onsen	Limited Express Hamakaze	Satsu or Kasumi
Kinosaki-Onsen	Local	Satsu

== History ==
Takeno Station opened on October 25, 1911. With the privatization of the Japan National Railways (JNR) on April 1, 1987, the station came under the aegis of the West Japan Railway Company.

== Passenger statistics ==
In fiscal 2017, the station was used by an average of 226 passengers daily.

== Surrounding area ==
- Takenohama
- Cape Nekozaki
- Toyooka City Takeno Elementary School / Junior High School

== See also ==
- List of railway stations in Japan
