= Higashi-Yodogawa Station =

Railway station in Osaka, Japan

Coordinates: 34.7392°N 135.5041°E

Higashi-Yodogawa Station 東淀川駅
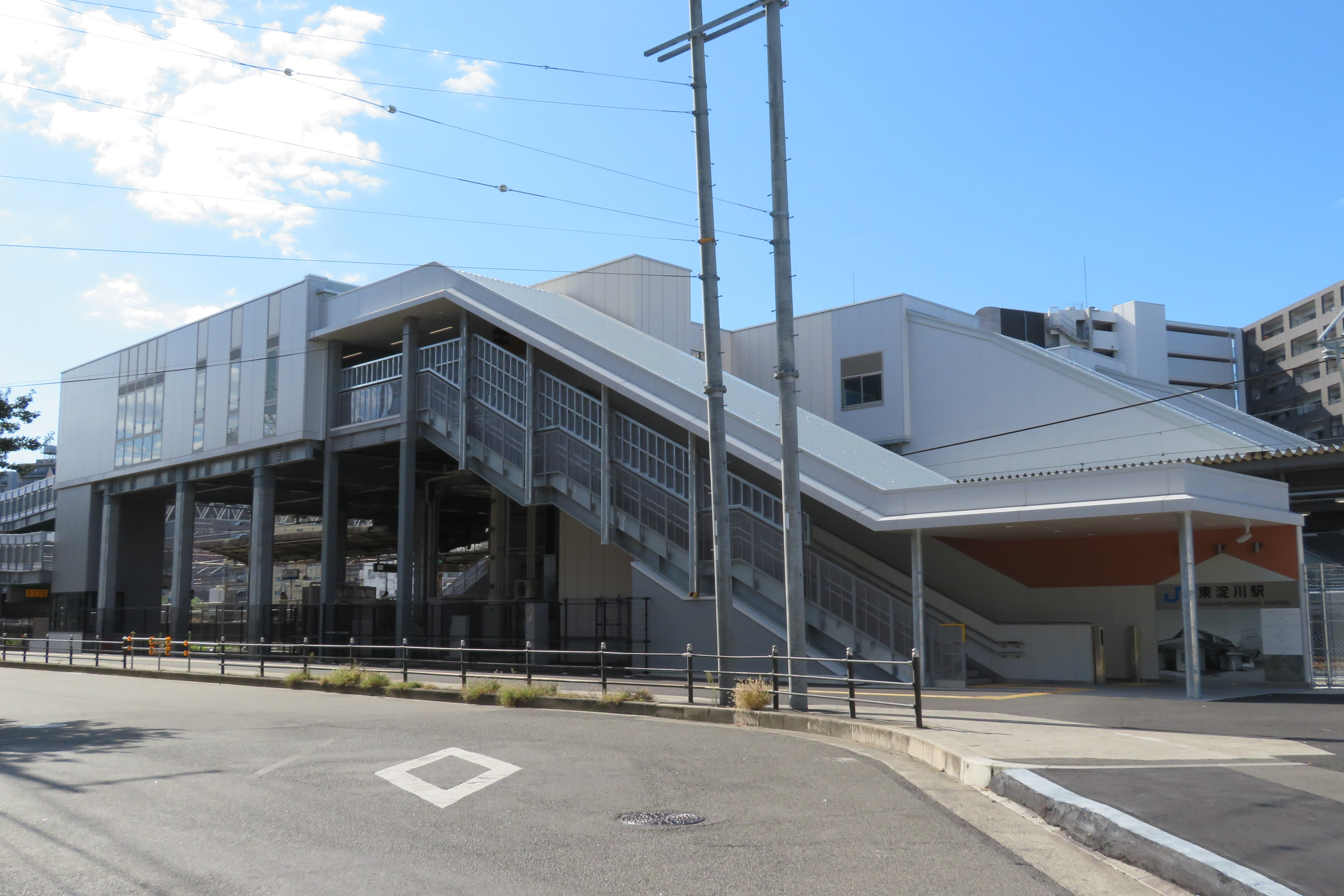
- Station building

General information
- Location: 3-17, Miyahara Nichome, Yodogawa, Osaka, Osaka （大阪府大阪市淀川区宮原二丁目3-17） Japan
- Operator: JR West
- Lines: Tōkaidō Main Line; (JR Kyoto Line)

Construction
- Structure type: Ground level
- Accessible: Yes

Other information
- Station code: JR-A45

History
- Opened: 1940

Passengers
- FY 2023: 14,492 daily

Services
Preceding station	JR West	Following station
Suita towards Kyōto	JR Kyōto Line Local	Shin-Ōsaka towards Ōsaka
Location

Higashi-Yodogawa Station (東淀川駅, Higashi-Yodogawa-eki) is a train station in Yodogawa-ku, Osaka, Osaka Prefecture, Japan.

== Line ==
- West Japan Railway Company
  - JR Kyoto Line (Tōkaidō Main Line)

== History ==
Higashi-Yodogawa Station opened on 1 April 1940. When the Tōkaidō Shinkansen and Shin-Osaka Station opened in 1964, the original plan was to close Higashi-Yodogawa (only 0.7 km (0.43 mi) from Shin-Osaka in what was then a largely rural area), but neighborhood residents' objections succeeded in keeping the station open. This distance is the shortest between any two stations on the JR Kyoto Line, as well as between any two stations on the entirety of the Tōkaidō Main Line, followed closely by Tokyo–Yūrakuchō on the Yamanote Line and the Keihin-Tōhoku Line and Sannomiya–Motomachi on the JR Kobe Line, at 0.8 km (0.50 mi) each.

Station numbering was introduced to the station in March 2018 with Higashi-Yodogawa being assigned station number JR-A45.

The original station was demolished and replaced by a new building in 2019. Along with the new facility, several roadway grade crossings were closed in the process to facilitate better traffic flow on surrounding roads that were often backed up due to long closures for rail traffic.

== Layout ==
The station has two island platforms, each of which exclusively serves up or down trains. The outer side of each platform is fenced as all trains on the outer tracks pass through this station without stopping.

1	■ JR Kyōto Line	Passing trains only
2	■ JR Kyōto Line	for Shin-Ōsaka, Ōsaka and Sannomiya
3	■ JR Kyōto Line	for Takatsuki and Kyōto
4	■ JR Kyōto Line	Passing trains only

== Adjacent stations ==
«	Service	»
Tōkaidō Main Line (JR Kyoto Line)
Suita	Local	Shin-Osaka
Rapid Service: Does not stop at this station
Special Rapid Service: Does not stop at this station
Limited Express "Hida": Does not stop at this station
Limited Express "Kuroshio": Does not stop at this station
