= Sannomiya Station (JR West) =

Railway station in Kobe, Japan

Sannomiya Station 三ノ宮駅
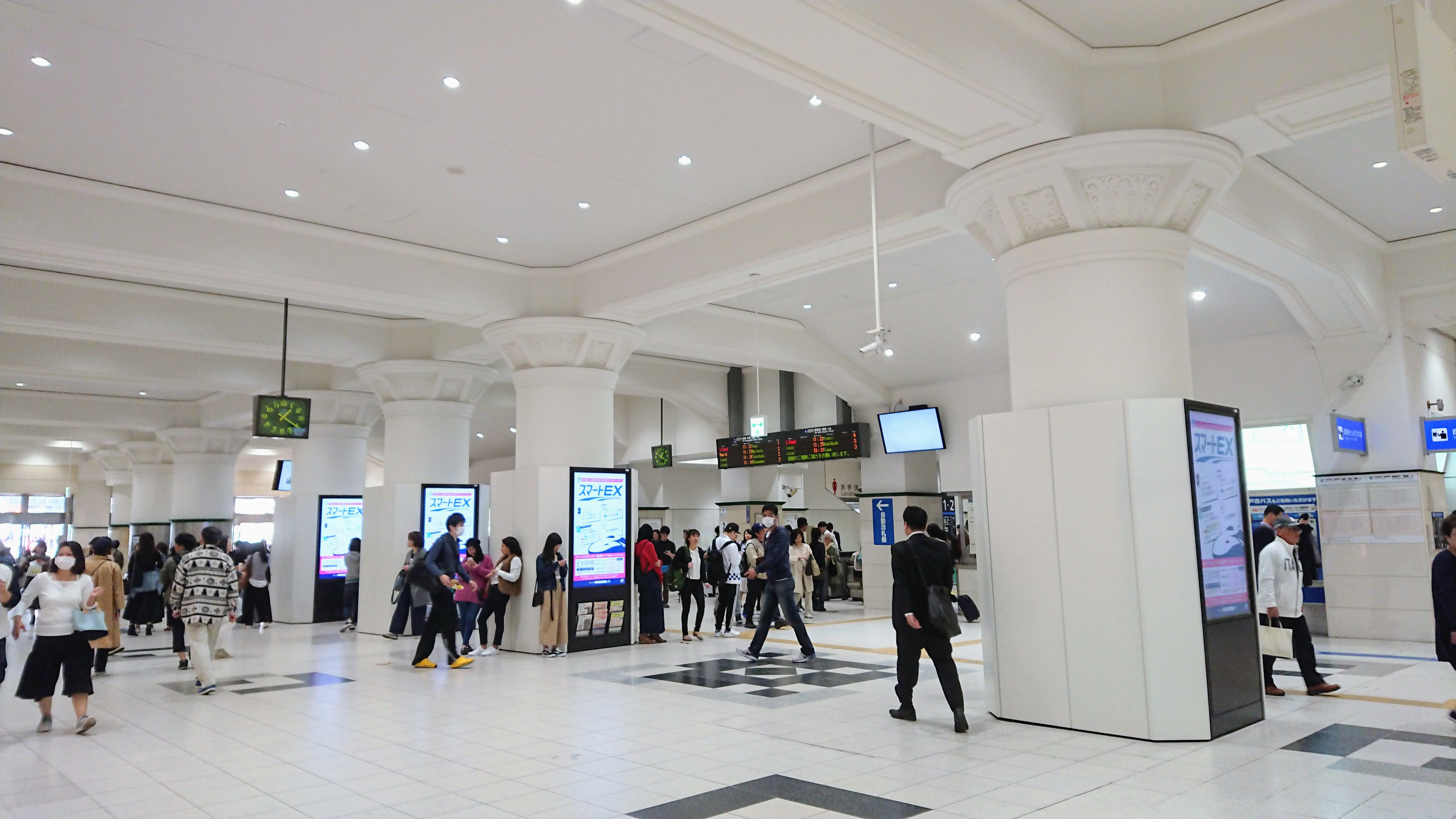
- Central concourse in April 2018

Japanese name
- Shinjitai: 三ノ宮駅
- Kyūjitai: 三ノ宮驛
- Hiragana: さんのみやえき

General information
- Location: 1-1, Nunobikichō Yonchōme, Chūō Ward, Kobe; Hyōgo Prefecture; Japan
- Coordinates: 34°41′41″N 135°11′42″E
- Operator: JR West
- Line: Tōkaidō Main Line (JR Kobe Line)
- Platforms: 2 island platforms
- Tracks: 4
- Connections: Bus terminal

Construction
- Structure type: Elevated
- Accessible: Yes

Other information
- Station code: JR-A61

History
- Opened: 11 May 1874; 152 years ago

Passengers
- FY 2023: 231,870 daily
Location

Sannomiya Station (三ノ宮駅, Sannomiya eki) is a railway station in Nunobiki-chō, Chūō-ku, Kobe, Hyōgo Prefecture, and is operated by the West Japan Railway Company (JR West). The station is on the JR Kobe Line which runs between Osaka Station and Himeji Station; part of the Tōkaidō Main Line. As a part of the JR West Urban Network, the following IC cards are accepted: ICOCA, Suica, PiTaPa, TOICA, and SUGOCA.

Sannomiya Station is the main terminal for Kobe and is approximately 2 km east of Kōbe Station. At the beginning of the Meiji period commercial and administrative functions were centred around Kobe Station. However, after Kobe opened as a port for foreign trade, and continuing with the post-World War II reconstruction and expansion of commercial areas, as well as moving Kobe City Hall to the Sannomiya area, the district soon became the new city centre.

Even now, Kobe Station is still the representative station of Kobe. For example, in relation to the calculation of Shinkansen fares, the number of operating kilometres to Shin-Kobe Station is calculated as being the same as to Kobe Station (despite Sannomiya Station in fact being the closest station to it). On the other hand, the number of passengers using Sannomiya Station is greater than that of Kobe Station. Also, the Kobe Terminal for highway buses is in front of Sannomiya Station, not Kobe Station. Likewise, there are more limited express trains, including overnight trains, which stop at Sannomiya Station than at Kobe Station.

== Station layout ==
=== Station placement ===
Most of the JR Kobe Line runs on four tracks (複々線, Fukufukusen), meaning that there are two tracks for each direction. Similar to other stations such as Nishinomiya Station, Sannomiya Station is of the island type, with two above-ground platforms which service four tracks. The inner tracks, Nos. 2 and 3, are for all-stations "Local" and "Rapid" trains. The outside tracks, Nos. 1 and 4, are used by "Rapid", "Special Rapid", and "Limited express" trains. Freight trains also pass on these tracks.

Tracks 1 and 4 are capable of accommodating a maximum fifteen-car train, while Tracks 2 and 3 are limited to twelve cars.

The distance to the adjacent Motomachi Station is the shortest anywhere on the JR Kobe Line.

=== Gates ===
The station has a total of three ticket gates. Access is via the East, Central and West entrances. The West exit provides direct access to the Hankyu Kobe-Sannomiya Station, Hanshin Kobe-Sannomiya Station, and Kobe Subway Sannomiya Station.

=== Ticket office ===
Sannomiya Station has a JR Midori no Madoguchi ticket office. It is open everyday from the first train until 23:00.

=== Platforms ===
1	■JR Kobe Line	Rapid/Special Rapid Service for Amagasaki, Osaka and Kyoto ■Overnight Limited Express Sunrise Seto/Sunrise Izumo for Yokohama and Tokyo ■Limited Express "Super Hakuto", "Hamakaze" for Osaka and Kyoto
2	■JR Kobe Line	Local/Rapid Service for Amagasaki, Osaka and Kyoto; Local for Kitashinchi
3	■JR Kobe Line	Local/Rapid Service for Nishi-Akashi and Himeji
4	■JR Kobe Line	Rapid/Special Rapid Service for Nishi-Akashi and Himeji ■Chizu Express Chizu Line Limited Express Super Hakuto for Tottori and Kurayoshi ■Bantan Line Limited Express Hamakaze for Kasumi, Hamasaka, and Tottori ■Commuter Limited Express Rakuraku Harima for Nishi-Akashi and Himeji

Rapid Service trains arriving at and departing from Track 4 in the evening do not stop at three stations: Suma, Tarumi and Maiko.

== Adjacent stations ==
«	Service	»
JR Kōbe Line (Tōkaidō Main Line)
Osaka (JR-A47)	Sleeper Limited Express Sunrise Seto & Limited Express Sunrise Izumo (eastbound)	Himeji (JR-A85)
Osaka (JR-A47)	West Express Ginga (San'yo and San'in Routes)	Kobe (JR-A63)
Osaka(JR-A47)	Limited Express Super Hakuto	Kobe (JR-A63) (No. 13 only); Akashi (JR-A73)
Osaka(JR-A47)	Commuter Limited Express Rakuraku Harima & Limited Express Hamakaze	Kobe (JR-A63)
Nada (JR-A60)	Local	Motomachi (JR-A62)
Rokkōmichi (JR-A58)	Rapid Service	Motomachi (JR-A62)
Ashiya (JR-A54)	Special Rapid Service	Kobe (JR-A63)

== Transfer to ==
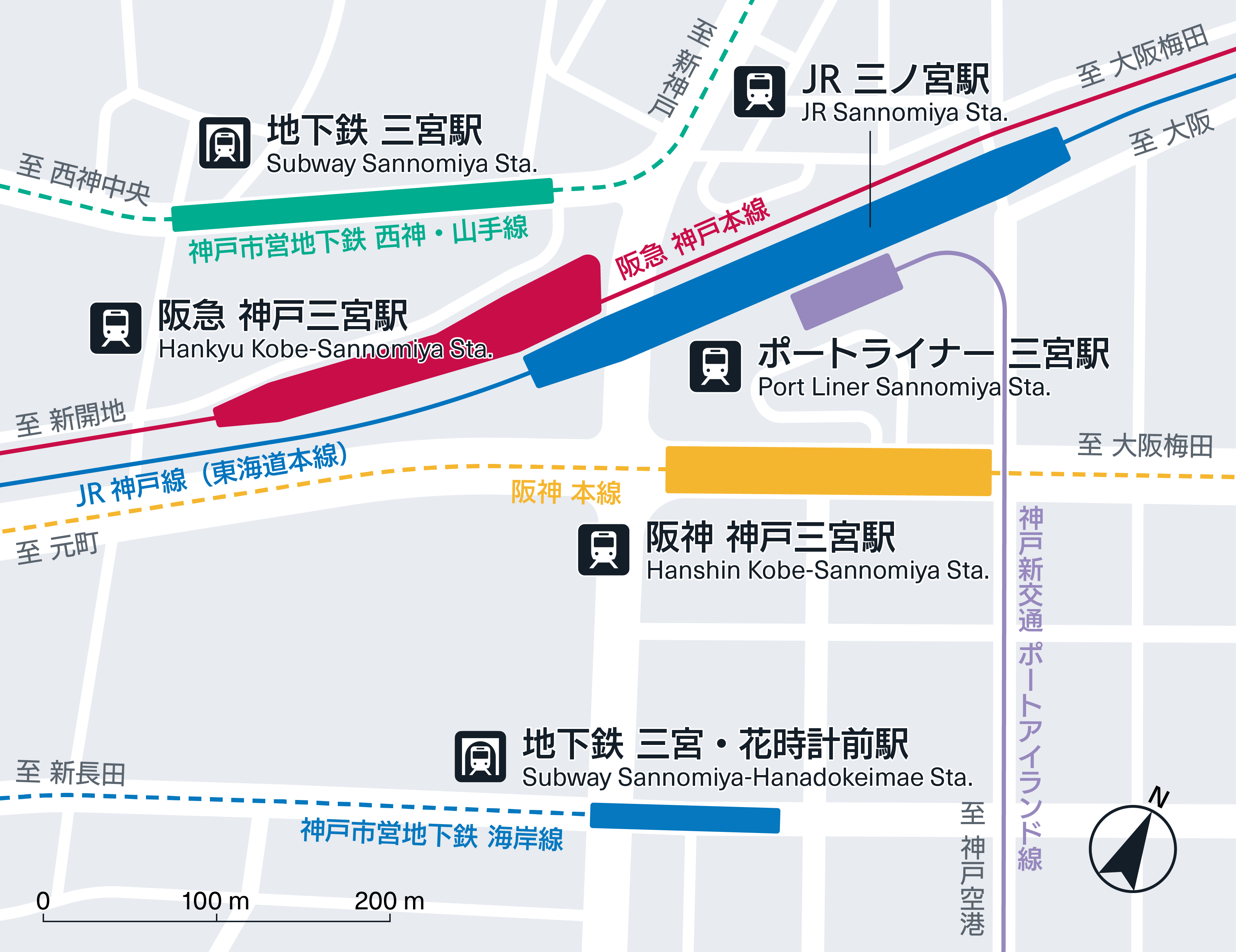
Location of the six stations at Sannomiya

- JR West
  - Sanyō Shinkansen: Access to the Shin-Kobe Station is via the Kobe Municipal Subway Seishin-Yamate Line.

All of the lines below, and their representative stations, are adjacent to JR Sannomiya Station, or are in adjoining buildings, or can be accessed by the underground shopping center, Santica (さんちか).

- Hankyu Railway (Kobe-Sannomiya Station)
  - Hankyū Kōbe Line
  - Kobe Kōsoku Line
- Hanshin Electric Railway (Kobe-Sannomiya Station)
  - Hanshin Main Line
- Kobe New Transit
  - Port Liner
- Kobe Municipal Subway
  - Seishin-Yamate Line
  - Kaigan Line (Sannomiya-Hanadokeimae Station)

== Surrounding area ==
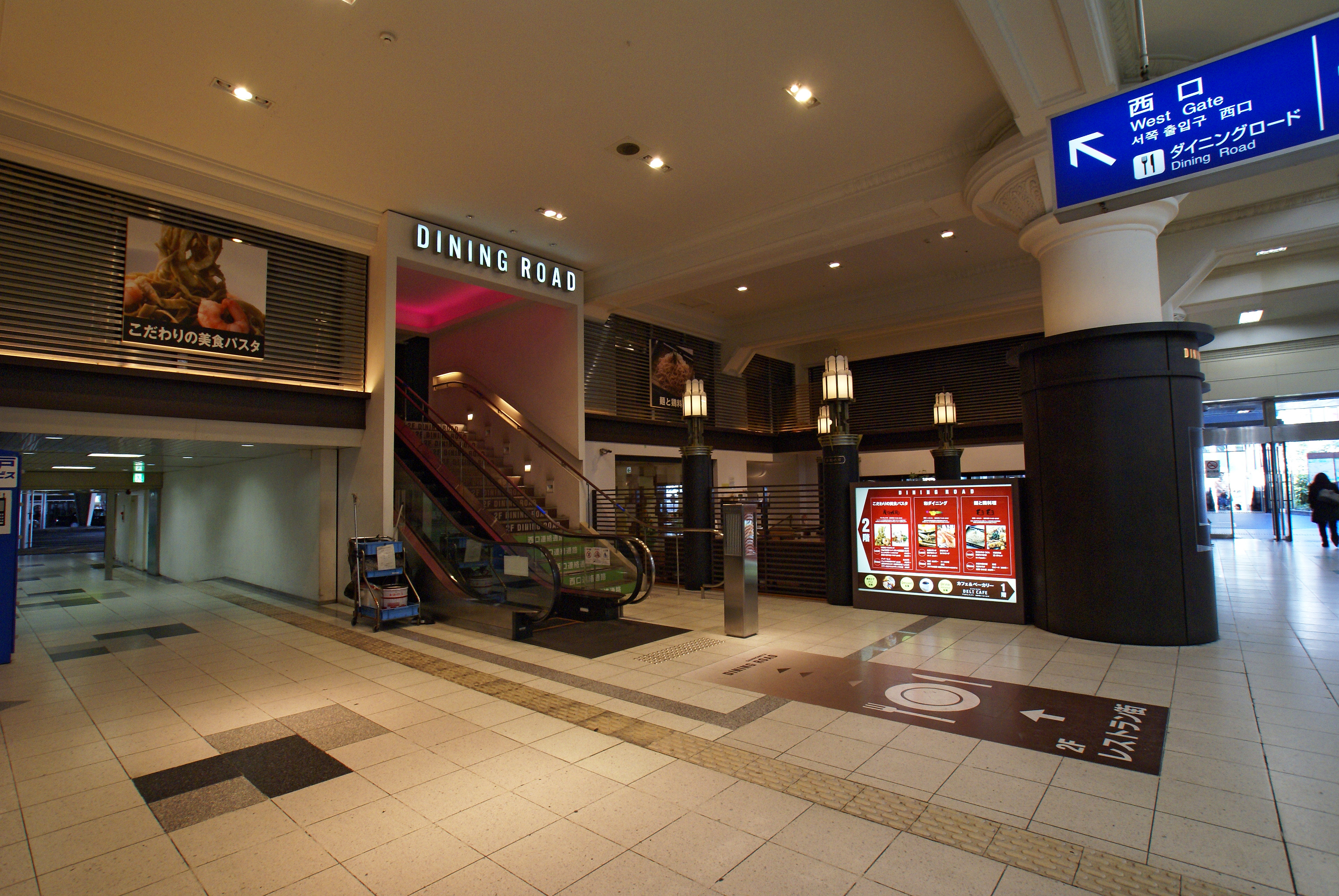
Restaurant Area "Dining Road" - In front of the Central Ticket Gate

The area around Sannomiya Station is the largest business and shopping district in Kobe City.

- Kobe Shimbun Kaikan (M-INT Kobe)
  - Sannomiya Bus Terminal (M1 - M11)
- JR Sannomiya Terminal Hotel
  - Bus stops (M12 - M14)
- Kobe Central Post Office Sannomiya Station Branch
- Shinki Bus Sannomiya Bus Terminal (M15)
- Daiei Sannomiya Ekimae
- Sogo Kobe
  - Bus stops (Y1 - Y7)
- Sannomiya Chikagai (Santica)
- Kobe Kōtsū Center Building
  - Minato Bank Sannomiya Branch
  - Airport limousine for Osaka International Airport and Kansai International Airport (S1)
  - Bus stop (Sannomiyacho Itchome) (S2)
- Kobe Marui
- Tokyu Hands Sannomiya
- Ikuta Shrine
- Sannomiya OPA
- Kobe City Hall
- Mizuho Bank Kobe Branch, Kobe Central Branch
- Kobe Mosque, Kobe Islamic Community Center
- Sumitomo Mitsui Banking Corporation Sannomiya Branch
- The Bank of Tokyo-Mitsubishi UFJ Sannomiya Branch
- Sannomiya Center Gai
  - Bus northbound stops (Hanshin-mae) (S3 - S6)
- National Route 2
- Hyogo Prefectural Route 21
- Flower Road / Hyogo Prefectural Route 30
  - Bus northbound stops (Subway Sannomiya) (N1 - N3)
  - Bus southbound stops (Subway Sannomiya) (N4 - N8)

== Ridership ==
On the first day of fiscal year 2005, 115,115 people boarded trains at Sannomiya Station, ranking fourth among JR West stations.

== History ==
- 11 May 1874: Passenger service begins between Osaka Station and Kobe Station. At the same time, Sannomiya Station opens for passenger service.
- 1 May 1918: Freight and cargo services moved to Kōbekō Station, and were no longer handled at Sannomiya Station.
- 10 October 1931: During the change from ground level platforms to overhead platforms, Sannomiya Station was moved from where the current Motomachi Station is to where the station is now.
  - Sogo and other large businesses were moving to the area around the current Sannomiya Station. That area was being developed to be the new center of the city, so it was decided that a new station would be built in that area. The new station built was given the name Sannomiya Station. After the relocation, the former station was reopened in 1934 as Motomachi Station.

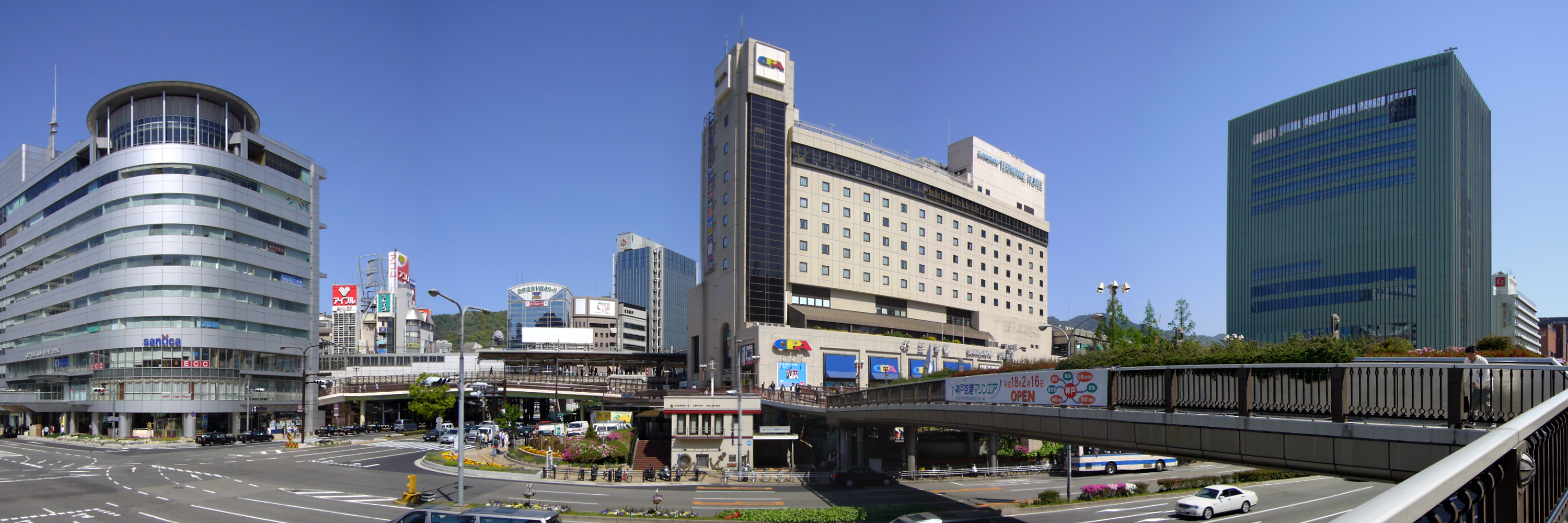
Historic view of the south side of the station and surroundings, including the former station building (center, 1981–2018), from 2006

- 1 April 1987 - With the breaking up of Japanese National Railways into separate individual business units, Sannomiya Station began operating under the West Japan Railway Company.
- 17 January 1995: Due to the Great Hanshin earthquake, all traffic ceased.
- 20 February 1995: Service between Nada Station and Kobe Station resumed. At that point, part of the platform directly above Flower Road remained removed, so passengers were able to use only the Central and East Entrances. The West Entrance reopened at the end of June.
- March 2018: Station numbering was introduced with Sannomiya being assigned station number JR-A61.

In the past, Blue Trains (overnight trains with non-sleeper passenger cars) leaving Tokyo Station would stop at Sannomiya Station. However, the last of the Blue Trains that stopped, the Fuji, was merged with the Hayabusa in the route/time-table revision on March 1, 2005, and no longer stops. During the time that the Fuji did stop at Sannomiya Station, the next stop was Ogōri Station (小郡駅) (present day Shin-Yamaguchi Station).

== Etymology ==
The name of the area, as well as the station's name, originates from Sannomiya Shrine. Until 1931, Sannomiya Station occupied the place where the modern day Motomachi Station has been established. Motomachi Station is now the closest station to Sannomiya Jinja, however, when the new Sannomiya Station was built, the name went with it.

All of the other transportation facilities in Sannomiya are written in Japanese as 三宮, without the Katakana character "ノ". Only JR includes it in the name, written as 三ノ宮駅. It is thought the reason it was included was to prevent people traveling from other parts of the country from misreading the name. The characters of the station's name can be read many different ways. Now, the difference in the name has actually become helpful to travelers.

In similar fashion, when Nishinomiya Station opened on the same day, the character "ノ" was also displayed in that station's name. However, for many years, the city of Nishinomiya requested the name be changed to match the city's name. On 18 March 2007, in coordination with the opening of Sakura Shukugawa Station, the name was changed. However, in the case of Sannomiya Station, while the cost of changing all of the signage in the city would certainly be costly, it remains that there has been no request or demand for the name to be changed.

== Golden Bell Plaza ==
Near the Central Ticket Gate, is a place with golden bells suspended from the ceiling. This area is called the Golden Bell Plaza. Similar to the Silver Bell Meeting Area at Tōkyō Station, the Golden Bell Plaza is intended to be a familiar place to everyone and a convenient place to meet. The bells were a donation from the Kōbe Central Lions Club.
