= Kutani Station =

Railway station in Shin'onsen, Hyōgo Prefecture, Japan

Kutani Station 久谷駅
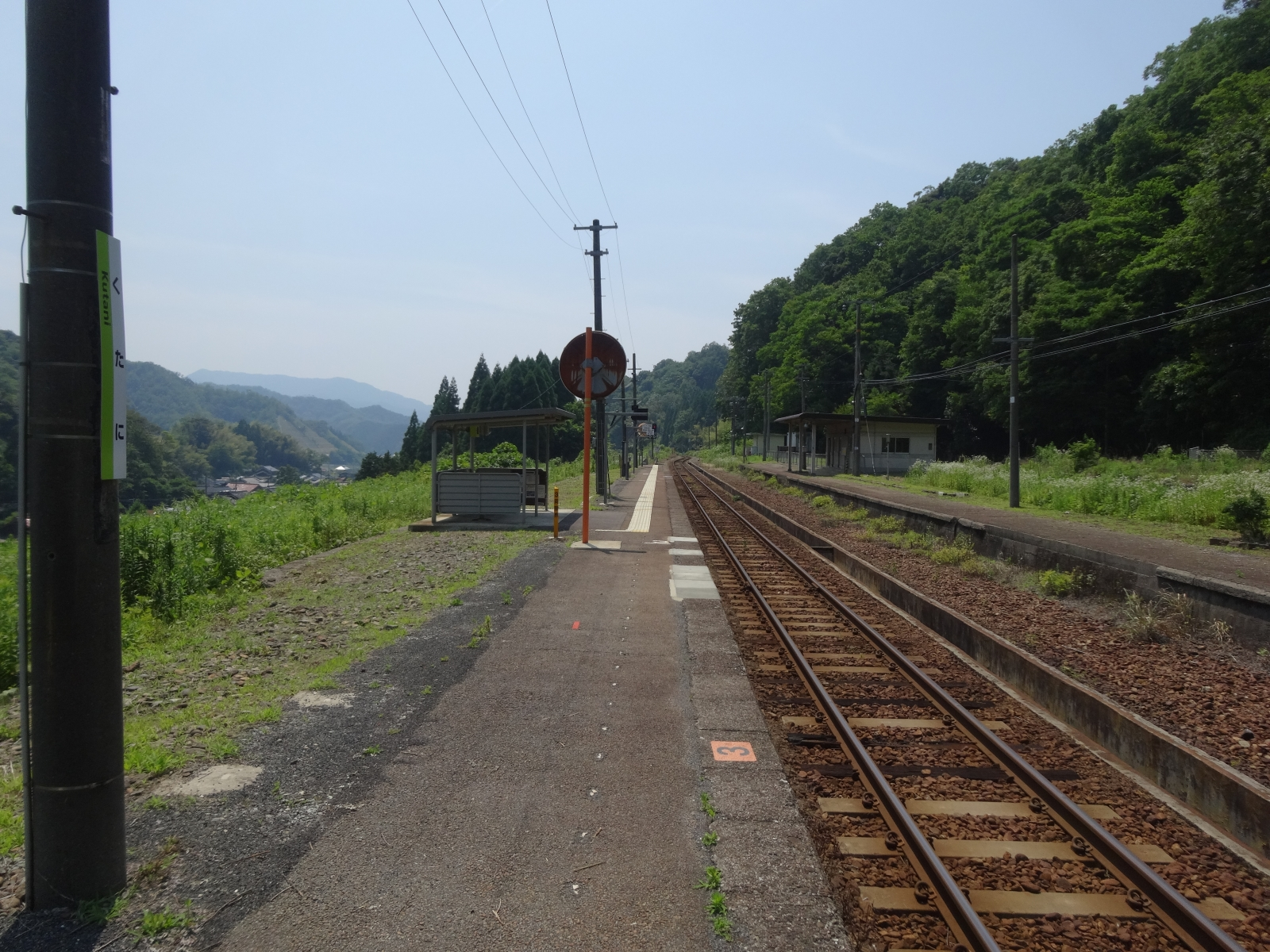
- Kutani Station, June 2018

General information
- Location: Kutani, Shin'onsen-machi, Mikata-gun, Hyōgo-ken 669-6721; Japan
- Coordinates: 35.6277°N 134.5176°E
- Owner: West Japan Railway Company
- Operator: West Japan Railway Company
- Line: San'in Main Line
- Distance: 191.8 km (119.2 miles) from Kyoto
- Platforms: 1 side platform
- Connections: Bus stop

Other information
- Status: Unstaffed
- Website: Official website

History
- Opened: 1 March 1912

Passengers
- FY2016: 12 daily
Location
- Location within Hyōgo Prefecture Location within Japan

Kutani Station (久谷駅, Kutani-eki) is a passenger railway station located in the town of Shin'onsen, Mikata District, Hyōgo, Japan, operated by West Japan Railway Company (JR West).

== Lines ==
Kutani Station is served by the San'in Main Line, and is located 191.8 kilometers from the terminus of the line at Kyoto.

== Station layout ==
The station consists of one ground-level side platform serving single bi-directional track. The station is unattended.

== Adjacent stations ==
«	Service	»
West Japan Railway Company (JR West) San'in Main Line
Limited Express Hamakaze: Does not stop at this station
Amarube	Local	Hamasaka

== History ==
Kutani Station opened on March 1, 1912.

== Passenger statistics ==
In fiscal 2016, the station was used by an average of 12 passengers daily

== Surrounding area ==
- Kutani Post Office
- Momokan Pass / Momokan Tunnel

== See also ==
- List of railway stations in Japan
