= Hamakaze =

Japanese limited express train service

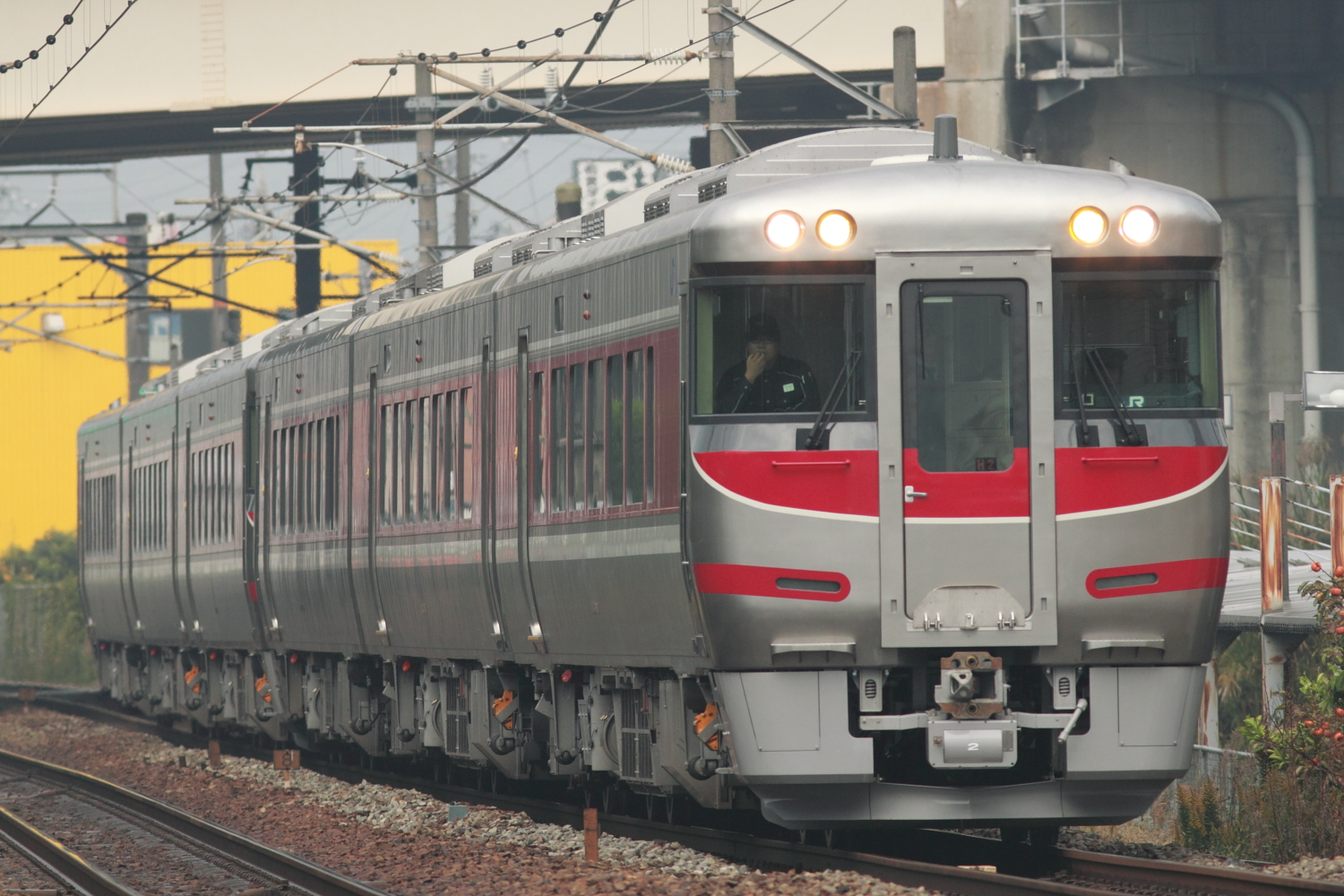
- KiHa 189 series on a Hamakaze service, November 2010

Overview
- Service type: Limited express
- Status: Operational
- Locale: Tokaido Main Line, Sanyo Main Line, Bantan Line, Sanin Main Line
- First service: 15 March 1972
- Current operator(s): JR West
- Former operator(s): JNR

Route
- Termini: Osaka; Kasumi, Tottori
- Stops: 21
- Distance travelled: 214.5 km (133.3 mi) (Osaka – Kasumi); 264.8 km (164.6 mi) (Osaka – Tottori)
- Average journey time: 3 hours 30 minutes approx
- Service frequency: 3 return workings daily

On-board services
- Class(es): Standard class only
- Disabled access: Yes
- Seating arrangements: 2+2
- Sleeping arrangements: None
- Catering facilities: None
- Observation facilities: None
- Entertainment facilities: None
- Other facilities: Toilets

Technical
- Rolling stock: KiHa 189 series DMUs
- Track gauge: 1,067 mm (3 ft 6 in)
- Electrification: None
- Operating speed: 120 km/h (75 mph)
- Track owner(s): JR West

The Hamakaze (はまかぜ) is a limited express train service in Japan operated by West Japan Railway Company (JR West), which runs from Osaka to Kasumi and Tottori.

== Stops ==
Trains stop at the following stations:

Osaka – Sannomiya – Kobe – Akashi – (Nishi-Akashi) – (Kakogawa) – Himeji – Fukusaki – Teramae – Ikuno – Wadayama – Yōka – Ebara – Toyooka – Kinosaki-Onsen – Takeno – (Satsu) – Kasumi – Hamasaka – Iwami – Tottori

- Only the Hamakaze No. 5 stops at Nishi-Akashi and Kakogawa.
- Trains also stop at Kakogawa and Satsu during winter.

== Rolling stock ==
New 130 km/h KiHa 189 series 3-car DMU sets were introduced on Hamakaze services from 7 November 2010.

Prior to November 2010, services were operated by 4-car KiHa 181 series DMU formations, lengthened to 5 or 7 cars in busy seasons.

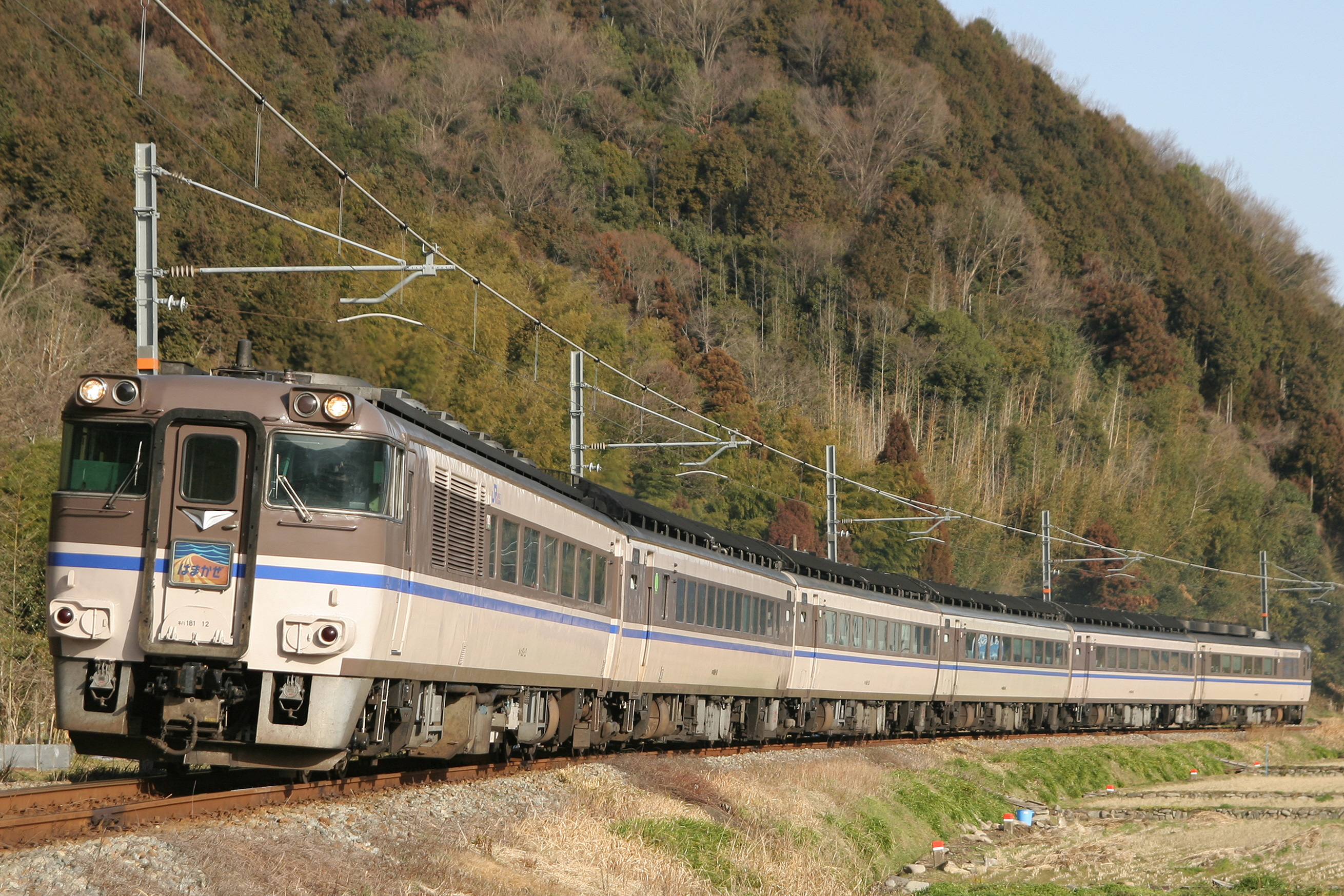
KiHa 181 series on a Hamakaze service on the Bantan Line, February 2009

== Formations ==
As of 2021, trains are formed as shown below, with car 3 at the Osaka end.

=== Hamakaze 1 – 6 ===
Car No.	1	2	3
Accommodation	Reserved	Reserved	Reserved
Facilities			Wheelchair-accessible toilet

- All cars are standard class.
- All seats are reserved.
- All cars are no-smoking.
- Trains run as 6-car formations during busy periods.

== History ==
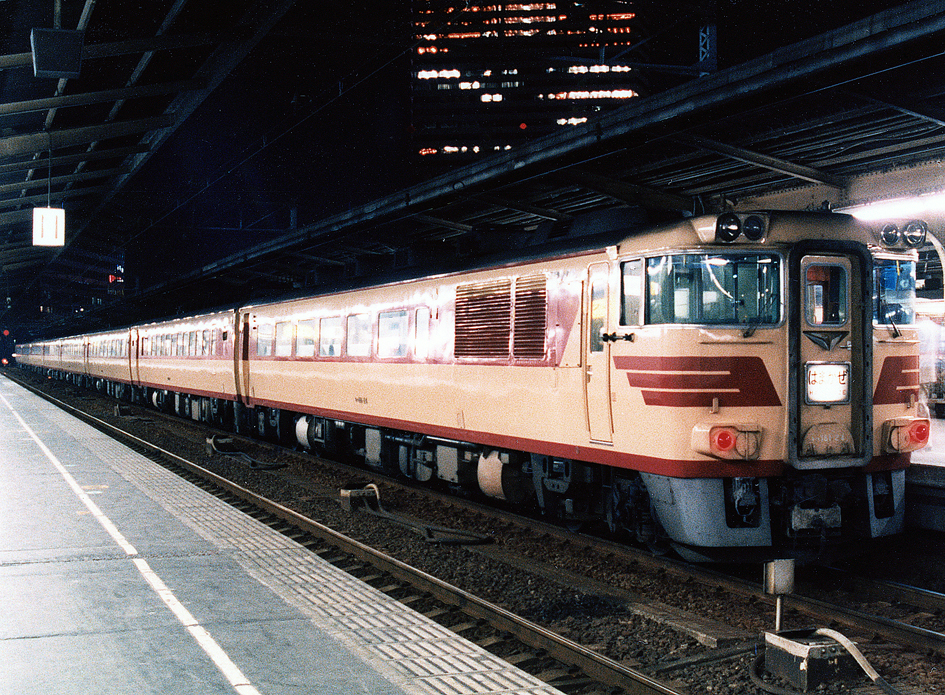
A KiHa 181 series DMU on a Hamakaze service, 1983

The Hamakaze service was introduced by Japanese National Railways (JNR) on 15 March 1972.

All cars were made no-smoking from 1 June 2009.
