= Iwami Station (Tottori) =

Railway station in Iwami, Tottori Prefecture, Japan

Iwami Station 岩美駅
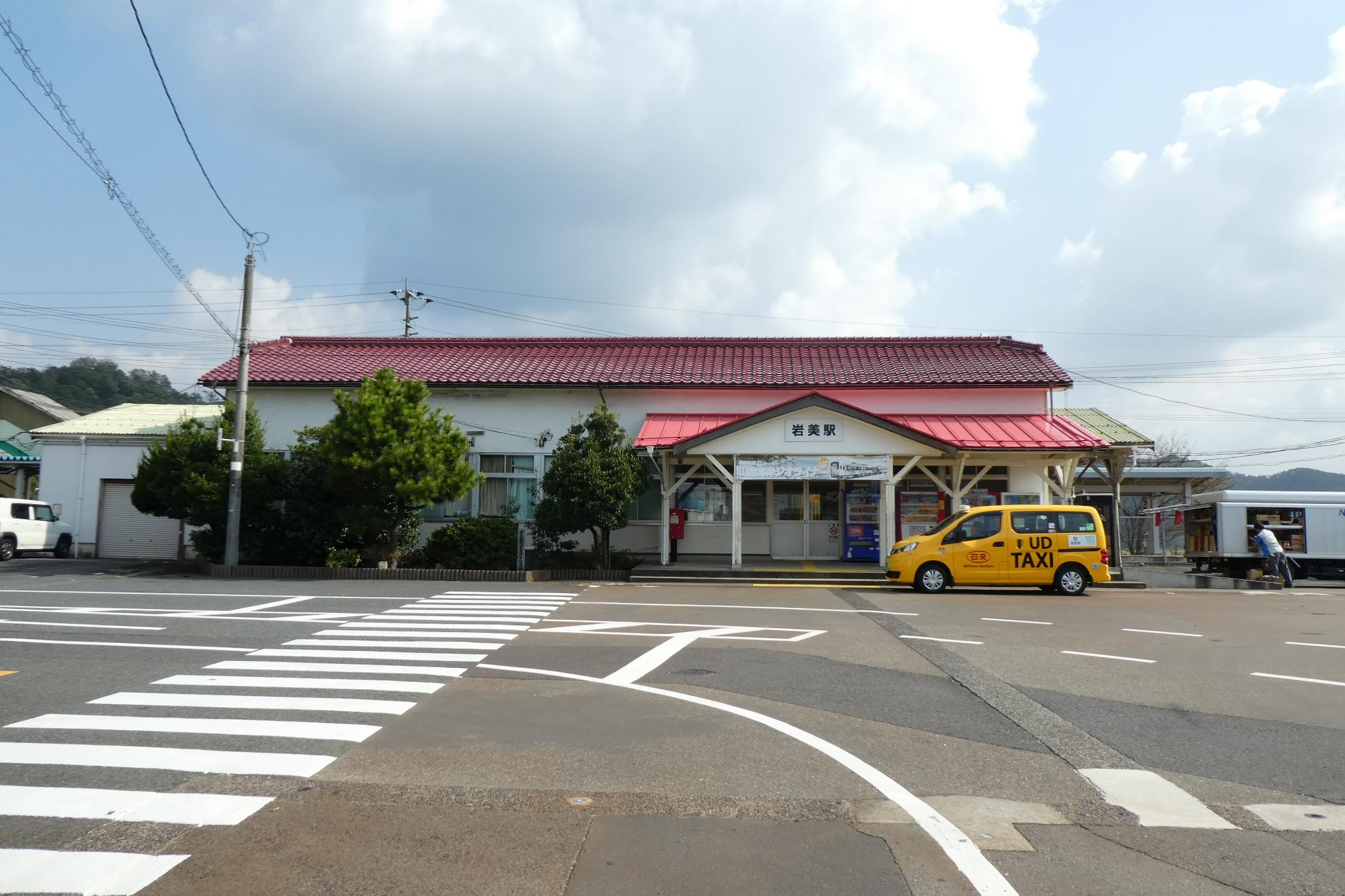
- Iwami Station, 2019

General information
- Location: Uradome, Iwami-cho, Iwami-gun, Tottori-ken 681-0003; Japan
- Coordinates: 35°34′27.4″N 134°20′7.72″E
- Owner: JR West
- Operator: JR West
- Line: San'in Main Line
- Distance: 211.9 km (131.7 miles) from Kyoto
- Platforms: 1 side + 1 island platform
- Connections: Bus stop

Other information
- Status: Unstaffed
- Website: Official website

History
- Opened: 10 June 1910

Passengers
- FY2018: 772 daily
Location
- Location within Tottori Prefecture Location within Japan

Iwami Station (岩美駅, Iwami-eki) is a passenger railway station located in the town of Iwami, Iwami District, Tottori Prefecture, Japan. It is operated by the West Japan Railway Company (JR West).

== Lines ==
Iwami Station is served by the San'in Main Line, and is located 211.9 kilometers from the terminus of the line at Kyoto.

== Station layout ==
The station consists of one ground-level side platform connected by a footbridge to a ground level island platform. The station is unattended.

=== Platforms ===
| 1 | ■ San'in Main Line | for Hamasaka and Toyooka |
| 2, 3 | ■ San'in Main Line | for Tottori and Yonago |

== Adjacent stations ==
| « | Service | » |
West Japan Railway Company (JR West) San'in Main Line
| Hamasaka | Limited Express Hamakaze | Tottori |
| Higashihama | Local | Ōiwa |

== History ==
At the end of the Meiji era, the San'in Main Line was extended from the west and Tottori Station opened in 1908. After that, a route heading east along the coastline was planned, but Iwai Village petitioned for a route that would follow the old San'in Highway, pass through Iwai Onsen, and pass through the mountains to Tajima. There was a battle between the mountain route recommended by Iwai Village and the seaside route recommended by Uradome Village, Hamasaka, and Toyooka, but due to the opposition of the farmers near Iwai and the cost of building the sea side route being cheaper, it was decided to build a station at the midpoint between Uradome Village and Iwai Village, about 4 kilometers in a straight line from the hot spring area. There was also a dispute between Iwai Village and Uradome Village over the name of the station, and Prime Minister Taro Katsura decided to name it Iwami Station.

The station opened on June 10, 1910. With the privatization of the Japan National Railways (JNR) on April 1, 1987, the station came under the aegis of the West Japan Railway Company.

== Passenger statistics ==
In fiscal 2018, the station was used by an average of 772 passengers daily.

== Surrounding area ==
- Iwami Town Hall
- Tottori Prefectural Iwami High School
- Iwami Town Iwami Junior High School
- Healthy Center Iwami Hospital
- Iwami Town Tourist Information Center

== See also ==
- List of railway stations in Japan
