= Nada Station =

Railway station in Kobe, Japan

Nada Station 灘駅
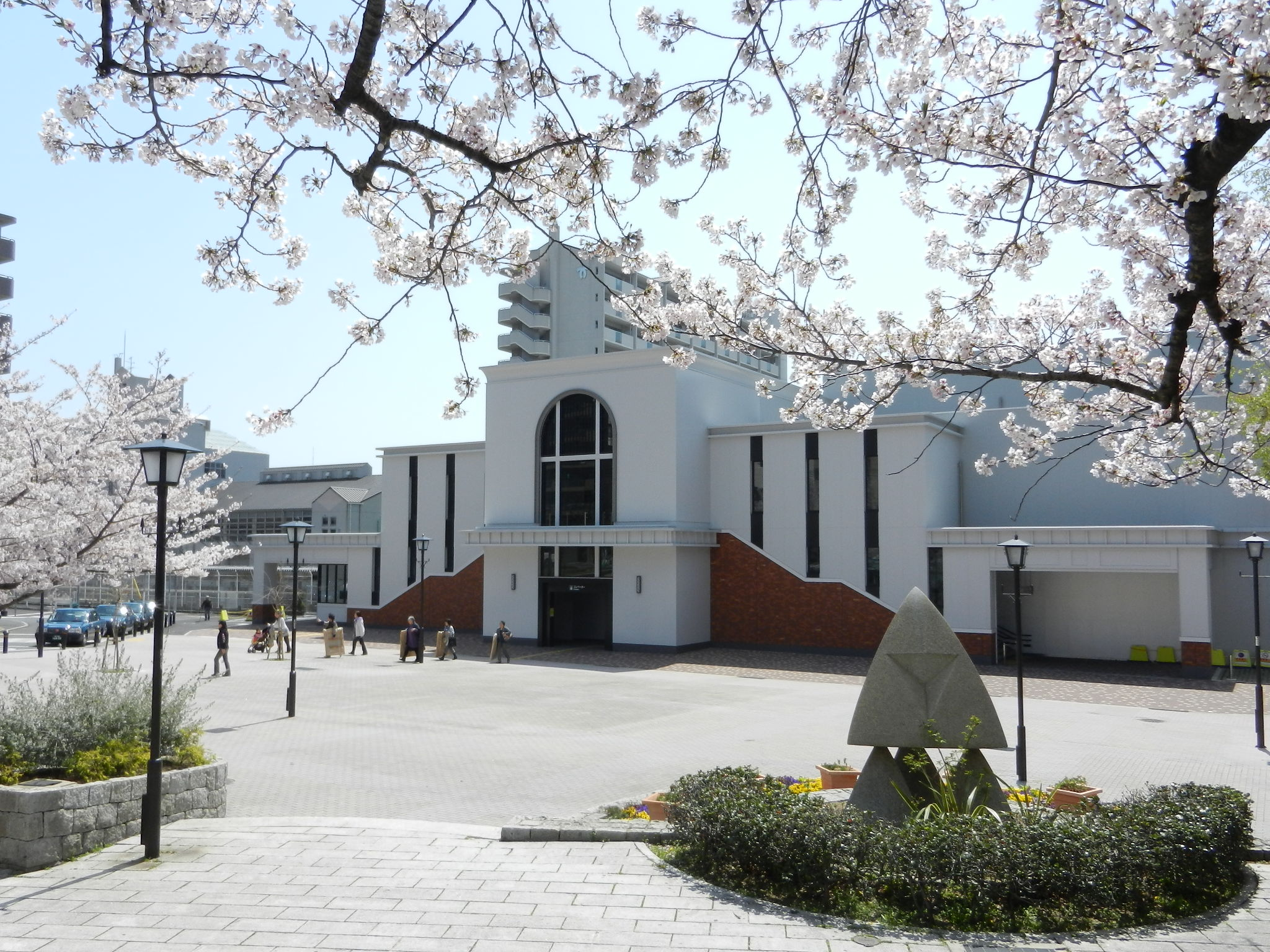
- Nada Station in 2011

General information
- Location: 7-chōme-3 Iwaya Kitamachi, Nada-ku, Kobe-shi, Hyōgo-ken 657-0846; Japan
- Coordinates: 34°42′22.32″N 135°12′59.4″E
- Owner: JR West
- Operator: JR West
- Line: Tōkaidō Main Line (JR Kobe Line)
- Distance: 584.6 km (363.3 miles) from Tokyo
- Platforms: 2 island platforms
- Connections: Bus stop

Construction
- Structure type: Elevated
- Accessible: Yes

Other information
- Status: Staffed
- Station code: JR-A60
- Website: Official website

History
- Opened: 1 December 1917

Passengers
- FY 2023: 30,920 daily

Services
Preceding station	JR West	Following station
Sannomiya towards Himeji	JR Kōbe Line Local	Maya towards Ōsaka
Location
- Location within Hyōgo Prefecture Location within Japan

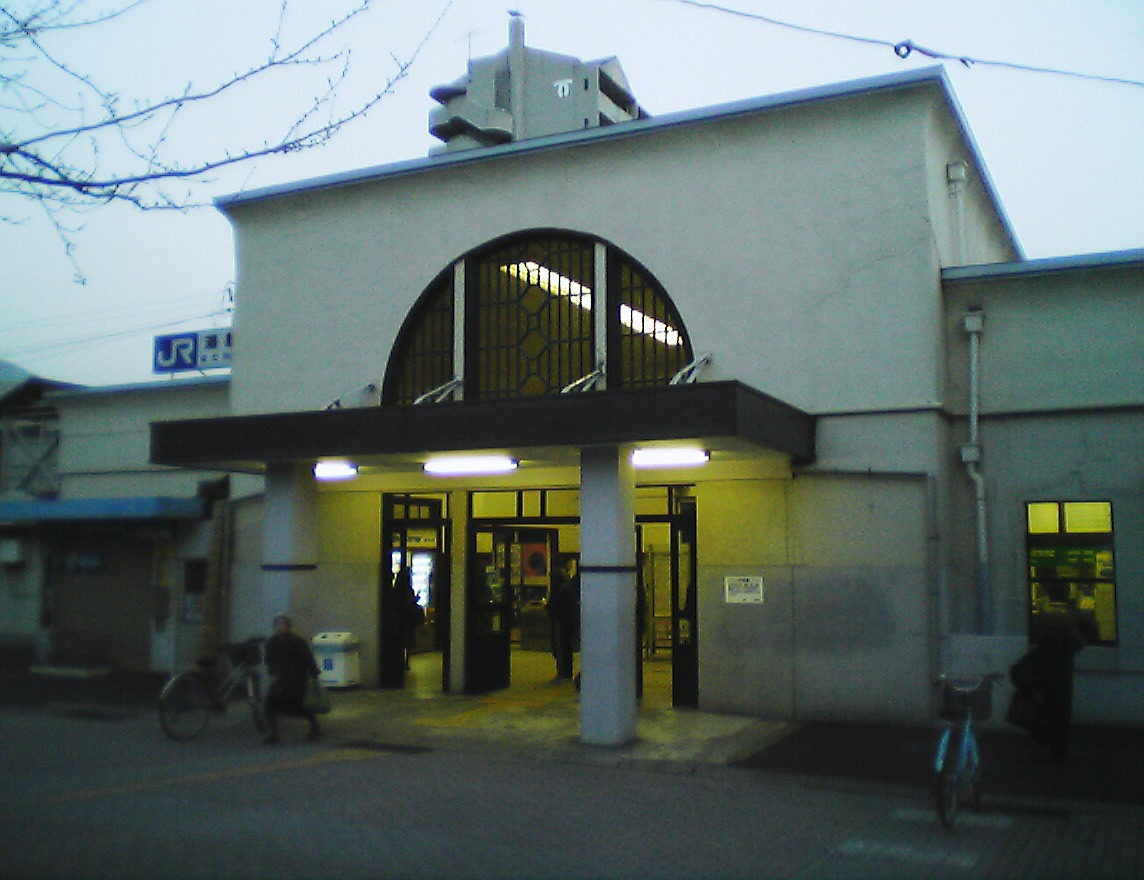
Old building (2006)

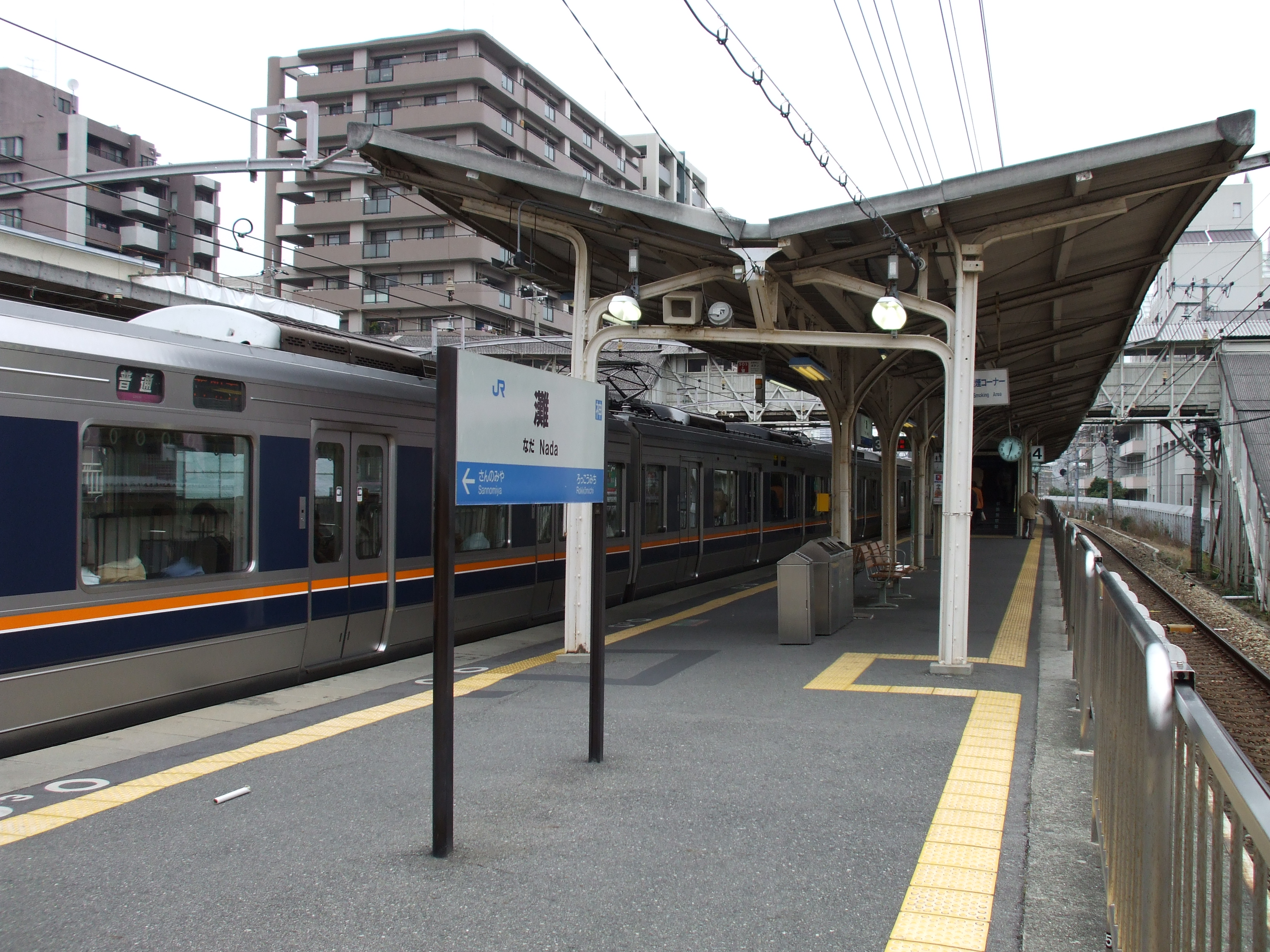
West-bound platform, facing east

Nada Station (灘駅, Nada-eki) is a passenger railway station located in Nada-ku, Kobe, Hyōgo Prefecture, Japan. It is operated by the West Japan Railway Company (JR West).

== Lines ==
Nada Station is served by the Tōkaidō Main Line (JR Kobe Line), and is located 584.6 kilometers from the terminus of the line at Tokyo and 28.2 kilometers from Osaka.

== Station layout ==
The station consists of two island platforms connected by an elevated station building; however, only the inner tracks are normally used, with the outer tracks reserved for passing express trains except during peak commuting hours. The station is staffed.

=== Platforms ===
1	■ JR Kobe Line	passing trains
2	■ JR Kobe Line	for Amagasaki, Osaka and Kyoto for Kitashinchi and Shijonawate via the JR Tozai Line
3	■ JR Kobe Line	for Sannomiya and Kakogawa
4	■ JR Kobe Line	passing trains

== History ==
Nada Station opened on 1 December 1917. With the privatization of the Japan National Railways (JNR) on 1 April 1987, the station came under the aegis of the West Japan Railway Company.

Station numbering was introduced in March 2018 with Nada being assigned station number JR-A60.

== Passenger statistics ==
In fiscal 2019, the station was used by an average of 20,677 passengers daily

== Surrounding area ==
- Kobe Municipal Oji Zoo
- Kobe Literature Museum
- Kobe Municipal Oji Sports Center (including Oji Stadium)
- BB Plaza Museum of Art
- Hyogo Prefectural Museum of Art
- WHO Kobe Center and the Disaster Reduction and Human Renovation Institution (which houses a museum commemorating the Great Hanshin Earthquake)

== See also ==
- List of railway stations in Japan
