= Nishi-Akashi Station =

Railway station in Akashi, Hyōgo Prefecture, Japan

A 74 Nishi-Akashi Station 西明石駅
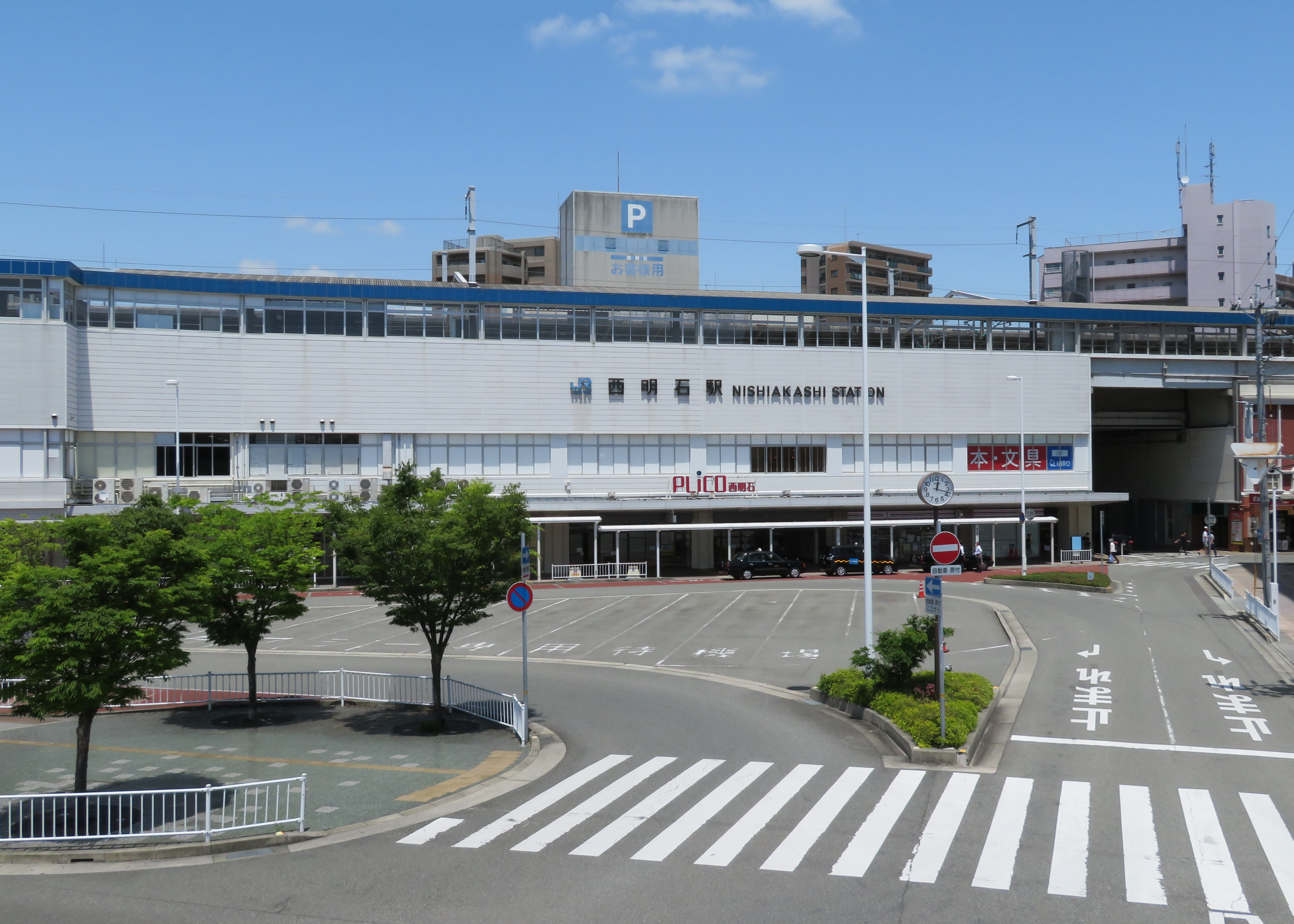
- West side of Nishi-Akashi Station, May 2020

General information
- Location: 2-7-20 Kokubo, Akashi City, Hyōgo Prefecture 673-0005; Japan
- Coordinates: 34°40′0.67″N 134°57′37.94″E
- Operator: JR West
- Lines: San'yō Shinkansen; A San'yō Line; A JR Kōbe Line (San-yō Main Line)
- Platforms: 2 side + 3 island platforms
- Connections: Bus terminal

Construction
- Structure type: Elevated (Shinkansen); At grade (Conventional line)
- Accessible: Yes

Other information
- Status: Staffed (Midori no Madoguchi)
- Station code: JR-A74
- Website: Official website

History
- Opened: 1 April 1944; 82 years ago

Passengers
- FY2019: 32,049 daily

Services
Preceding station	JR West	Following station
Himeji towards Hakata	San'yō Shinkansen Nozomi	Shin-Kobe towards Shin-Ōsaka
Himeji towards Hakata	San'yō Shinkansen Hikari	Shin-Kobe towards Shin-Ōsaka
Himeji towards Hakata or Hakataminami	San'yō Shinkansen Kodama	Shin-Kobe towards Shin-Ōsaka
Location
- Location within Hyōgo Prefecture Location within Kansai region Location within Japan

Nishi-Akashi Station (西明石駅, Nishi-Akashi-eki) is a passenger railway station located in the city of Akashi, Hyōgo, Japan, operated by West Japan Railway Company (JR West). As part of the Urban Network, the ICOCA, Suica, PiTaPa, TOICA and SUGOCA can all be used on the San'yō Main Line (they can not be used for Shinkansen service).

== Lines ==
Nishi-Akashi Station is served by the JR San'yō Main Line, and is located 22.8 kilometers from the terminus of the line at Kobe and 55.9 kilometers from Osaka. On the San'yō Shinkansen, the station is 59.7 kilometers from Shin-Osaka and 612.3 kilometers from Tokyo.

== Station layout ==
The Shinkansen and regular train platforms are located some distance from each other, and are connected by a pedestrian overpass located above a public road. As the overpass to the regular platform is inaccessible from the south entrance to the station, passengers are allowed to access it via the Shinkansen side of the station. The station has a Midori no Madoguchi staffed ticket office.

=== Barrier-free access ===
In order to better serve passengers with different needs, escalators and elevators are located in the following areas:

- Escalator
  - Within the west concourse area, one ascending and one descending
- Elevators
  - East entrance: On the north and south sides, accessible without need of a ticket
  - West entrance: One each on the concourse, Shinkansen platform, and regular train platform

=== Platforms ===
The San'yō Shinkansen has two elevated opposed side platforms. There are two pass-through lines between the two platforms as well, allowing trains to go through the station without stopping. The San'yō Main Line (JR Kōbe Line) has three island platforms which can handle six trains simultaneously.

1	■ San'yō Main Line (JR Kōbe Line)	for Sannomiya, Amagasaki, and Osaka (rapid (morning), special rapid)
2	■ San'yō Main Line (JR Kōbe Line)	for Kakogawa and Himeji (local (evening), special rapid)
3	■ San'yō Main Line (JR Kōbe Line)	for Sannomiya, Amagasaki, and Osaka (local (partly), rapid)
4	■ San'yō Main Line (JR Kōbe Line)	for Sannomiya, Amagasaki, and Osaka (local)
5	■ San'yō Main Line (JR Kōbe Line)	for Sannomiya, Amagasaki, and Osaka (local) starting for Kakogawa and Himeji (local, shunt line)
6	■ San'yō Main Line (JR Kōbe Line)	for Kakogawa and Himeji (local)
11	■ San'yō Shinkansen	for Okayama and Hakata
12	■ San'yō Shinkansen	for Shin-Osaka and Tokyo

== Adjacent stations ==
←	Service	→
JR Kobe Line
Kobe (JR-A63) (One-way Operation)	West Express Ginga (San'in Route)	Himeji (JR-A85)
Kobe (JR-A63)	West Express Ginga (San'yo Route)	Himeji (JR-A85)
Akashi (JR-A73)	Limited Express Super Hakuto No. 13; Limited Express Hamakaze No. 5 Commuter Limited Express Rakuraku Harima	Kakogawa (JR-A79)
Akashi (JR-A73)	Special Rapid	Kakogawa (JR-A79)
Akashi (JR-A73)	Rapid	Okubo (JR-A75)
Akashi (JR-A73)	Local	Okubo (JR-A75)

== History ==
Nishi-Akashi station opened on 1 April 1944. With the privatization of the Japan National Railways (JNR) on 1 April 1987, the station came under the aegis of the West Japan Railway Company.

Station numbering was introduced to the Kobe Line platforms in March 2018 with Nishi-Akashi being assigned station number JR-A74.

== Passenger statistics ==
In fiscal 2019, the station was used by an average of 32,049 passengers daily

== Surrounding area ==
- Kōbe Nishi-ku Branch Municipal Offices
- Kawasaki Heavy Industries Akashi Plant
- Honmichi Akashi branch (ほんみち明石出張所)

=== Highway access ===
- National Route 2
- National Route 250
- Hyōgo Prefectural Route 21 (Kōbe-Akashi Route)

== See also ==
- List of railway stations in Japan
