= Ōiwa Station =

Railway station in Iwami, Tottori Prefecture, Japan

Ōiwa Station 大岩駅
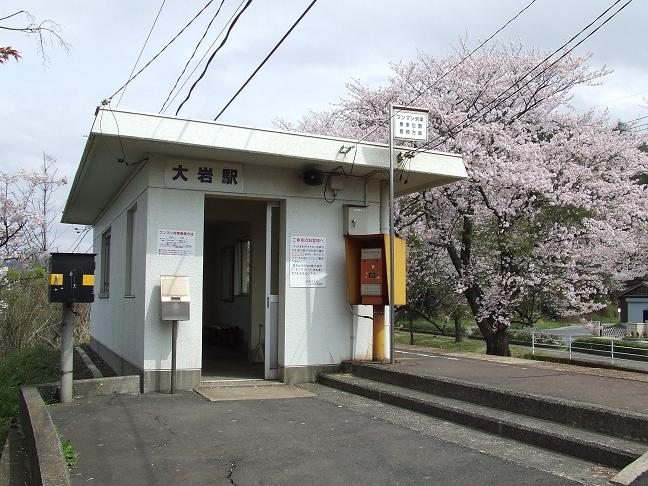
- Ōiwa Station, April 2008

General information
- Location: Otani, Iwami-cho, Iwami-gun, Tottori-ken 681-0073; Japan
- Coordinates: 35°34′0.96″N 134°18′30.46″E
- Owner: JR West
- Operator: JR West
- Line: San'in Main Line
- Distance: 214.8 km (133.5 miles) from Kyoto
- Platforms: 1 side platform
- Connections: Bus stop

Other information
- Status: Unstaffed
- Website: Official website

History
- Opened: 1 January 1950

Passengers
- FY2018: 204 daily
Location
- Location within Tottori Prefecture Location within Japan

Ōiwa Station (大岩駅, Ōiwa-eki) is a passenger railway station located in the town of Iwami, Iwami District, Tottori Prefecture, Japan. It is operated by the West Japan Railway Company (JR West).

== Lines ==
Ōiwa Station is served by the San'in Main Line, and is located 214.8 kilometers from the terminus of the line at Kyoto. Only local trains stop at this station.

== Station layout ==
The station consists of a single ground-level opposed side platform serving one bi-directional track. The station is unattended.

== Adjacent stations ==
«	Service	»
West Japan Railway Company (JR West) Sanin Main Line
Limited Express Hamakaze: Does not stop at this station
Iwami	Local	Fukube

== History ==
Ōiwa Station opened on January 1, 1950. With the privatization of the Japan National Railways (JNR) on April 1, 1987, the station came under the aegis of the West Japan Railway Company.

== Passenger statistics ==
In fiscal 2018, the station was used by an average of 204 passengers daily.

== Surrounding area ==
- Tottori Prefectural Route 328 Fukube Iwami Line (former National Route 9)
- Japan National Route 178
- Otani housing complex
- Iwami Municipal Iwami Nishi Elementary School

== See also ==
- List of railway stations in Japan
