= Shibayama Station =

Railway station in Kami, Hyōgo Prefecture, Japan

Shibayama Station 柴山駅
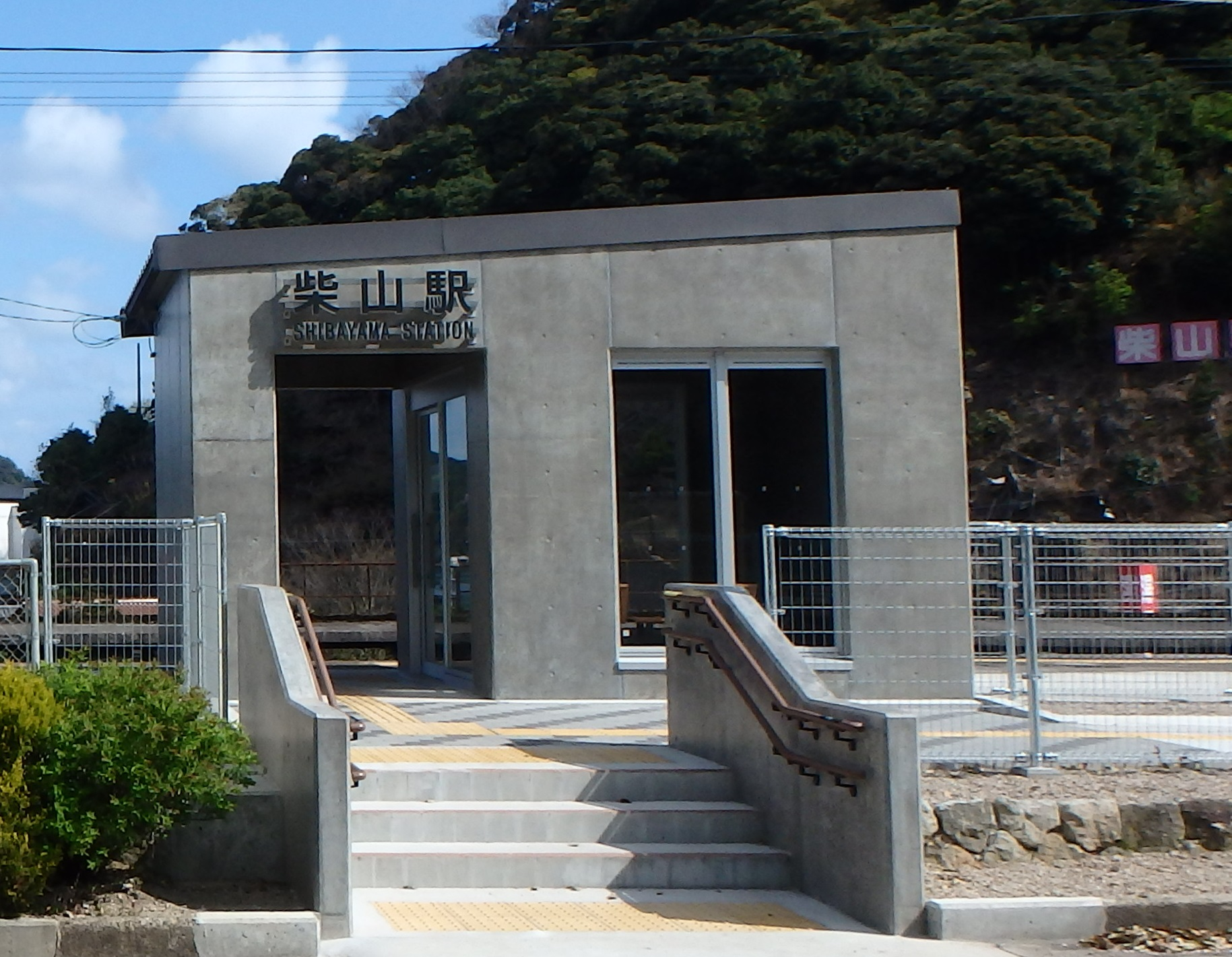
- Shibayama Station, April 2020

General information
- Location: Kasumiku Uragami, Kami-machi, Mikata-gun, Hyōgo-ken 669-6431; Japan
- Coordinates: 35.6464°N 134.6637°E
- Owner: West Japan Railway Company
- Operator: West Japan Railway Company
- Line: San'in Main Line
- Distance: 175.7 km (109.2 miles) from Kyoto
- Platforms: 1 side platform
- Connections: Bus stop

Other information
- Status: Unstaffed
- Website: Official website

History
- Opened: 26 June 1947

Passengers
- FY2019: 89 daily
Location
- Location within Hyōgo Prefecture Location within Japan

Shibayama Station (柴山駅, Shibayama-eki) is a passenger railway station located in the town of Kami, Mikata District, Hyōgo, Japan, operated by West Japan Railway Company (JR West).

== Lines ==
Shibayama Station is served by the San'in Main Line, and is located 175.7 kilometers from the terminus of the line at Kyoto.

== Station layout ==
The station consists of one ground-level side platform serving a single bi-directional track. The station is unattended.

== Adjacent stations ==
«	Service	»
West Japan Railway Company (JR West) San'in Main Line
Limited Express Hamakaze: Does not stop at this station
Satsu	Local	Kasumi

== History ==
Shibayama Station opened within Kuchisazu village on June 26, 1947. A second platform was opened on October 1, 1965. Freight operations were discontinued in 1971 and luggage handing in 1984. The station became unstaffed on October 1, 1984. With the privatization of the Japan National Railways (JNR) on April 1, 1987, the station came under the aegis of the West Japan Railway Company. Platform 1 was closed on March 3, 2001 and the station building was demolished in November 2018, with present concrete structure completed in January 2020.

== Passenger statistics ==
In fiscal 2016, the station was used by an average of 89 passengers daily.

== Surrounding area ==
- Shibayama fishing port
- Shibayama onsen

== See also ==
- List of railway stations in Japan
