= Kasumi Station =

Railway station in Kami, Hyōgo Prefecture, Japan

Kasumi Station 香住駅
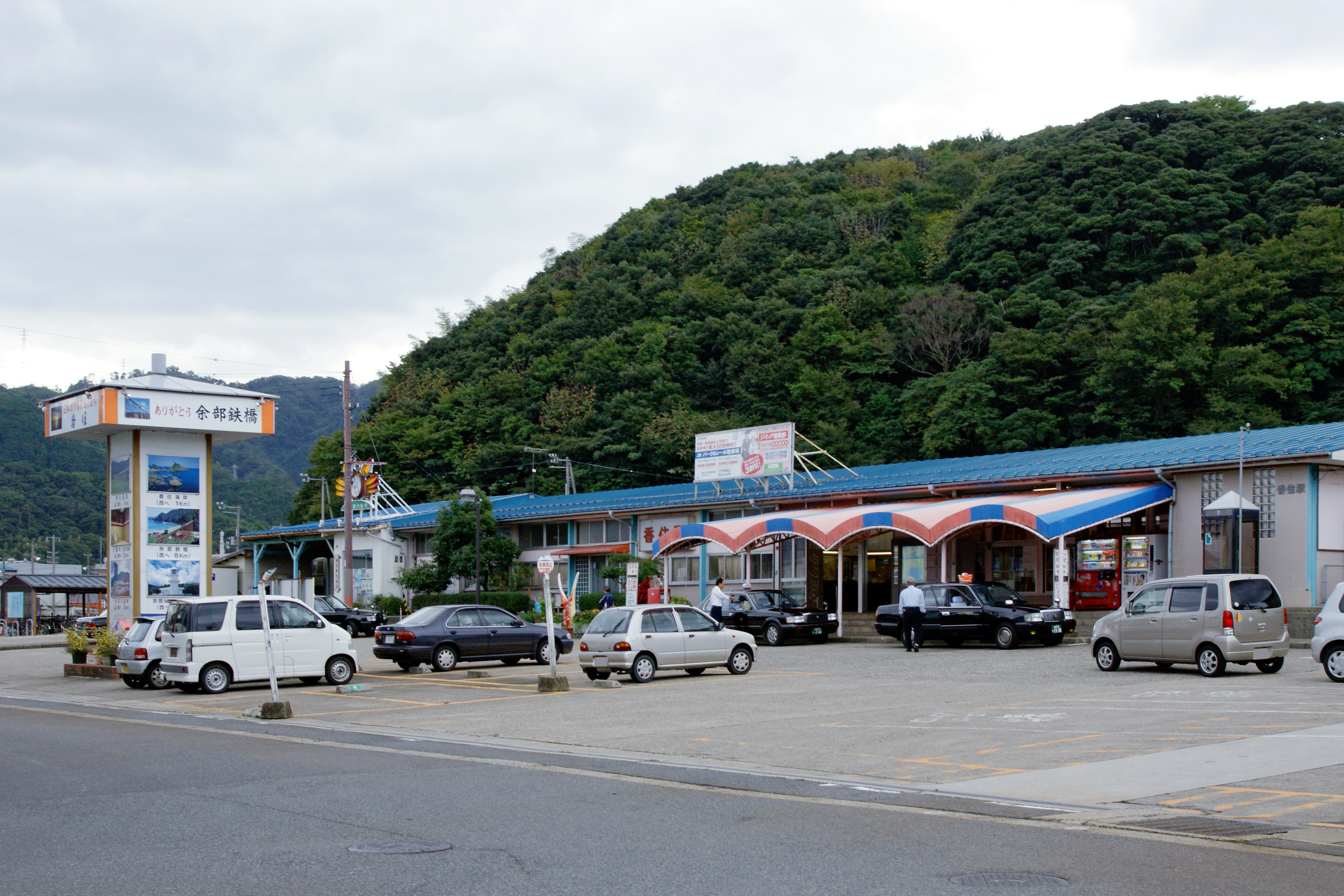
- Kasumi Station, February 2007

General information
- Location: Kasumiku Nanukaichi, Kami Town, Mikata District; Hyōgo Prefecture 69-6546; Japan
- Coordinates: 35.6353°N 134.6237°E
- Operator: JR West
- Line: San'in Main Line
- Distance: 180.0 km (111.8 miles) from Kyoto
- Platforms: 1 side + 1 island platform
- Connections: Bus stop

Construction
- Structure type: At grade

Other information
- Status: Unstaffed
- Website: Official website

History
- Opened: 25 October 1911; 114 years ago

Passengers
- FY2019: 388 daily

Services
Preceding station	JR West	Following station
Yoroi towards Yonago	San'in Line	Shibayama towards Kinosaki-Onsen
Location
- Location within Hyōgo Prefecture Location within Kansai region Location within Japan

Kasumi Station (香住駅, Kasumi-eki) is a passenger railway station located in the town of Kami, Mikata District, Hyōgo, Japan, operated by West Japan Railway Company (JR West). It opened on October 25, 1911.

== Lines ==
Kasumi Station is served by the San'in Main Line, and is located 180.0 kilometers from the terminus of the line at Kyoto.

== Station layout ==
The station consists of one ground-level side platform and one ground level island platform connected by an underground passage. The station is unattended.

=== Platforms ===
1	■ San'in Main Line	for Kinosaki Onsen and Toyooka
2, 3	■ San'in Main Line	for Hamasaka and Tottori

== Adjacent stations ==
«	Service	»
West Japan Railway Company (JR West) San'in Main Line
Satsu or Takeno	Limited Express Hamakaze	Hamasaka or Terminus

== Passenger statistics ==
In fiscal 2016, the station was used by an average of 388 passengers daily.

== See also ==
- List of railway stations in Japan
