= Kinosaki Onsen Station =

Railway station in Toyooka, Hyōgo Prefecture, Japan

Kinosaki Onsen Station 城崎温泉駅
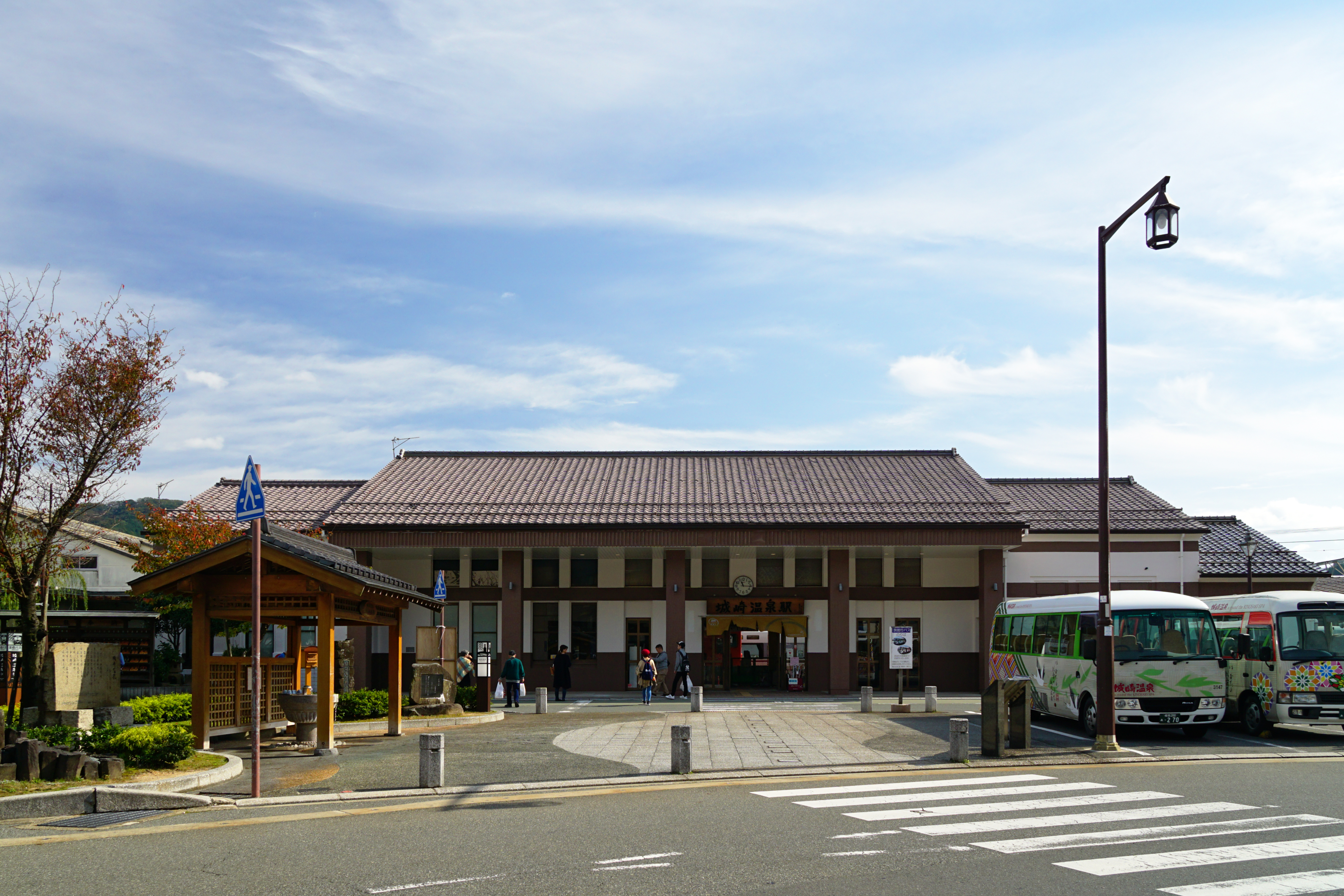
- Kinosaki Onsen Station forecourt, October 2016

General information
- Location: Kinosakicho Yushima, Toyooka-shi, Hyōgo-ken 669-6101; Japan
- Coordinates: 35°37′26″N 134°48′48″E
- Owner: West Japan Railway Company
- Operator: West Japan Railway Company
- Line: San'in Main Line
- Distance: 158.0 km (98.2 miles) from Kyoto
- Platforms: 2 side + 1 island platform

Other information
- Status: Staffed (Midori no Madoguchi)
- Website: Official website

History
- Opened: 5 September 1909
- Former names: Kinosaki (until 2005)

Passengers
- FY 2023: 1,812 daily
Location
- Location within Hyōgo Prefecture Location within Japan

Kinosaki Onsen Station (城崎温泉駅, Kinosaki-onsen-eki) is a passenger railway station located in the city of Toyooka, Hyōgo Prefecture, Japan, operated by West Japan Railway Company (JR West). It serves the onsen (hot spring) district of Kinosaki.

== Lines ==
Kinosaki Onsen Station is served by the San'in Main Line and is 158.0 kilometers from the terminus of the line at Kyoto. The station is the dividing point between the electrified segment of the line up to Kyoto, and the non-electrified segment down to Hōki-Daisen. This is the farthest along the line that any regularly scheduled train from Kyoto will go (except the Hakuto Limited Express, which stops at Tottori Station but avoids the San'in Line for much of its route). Passengers wishing to continue onward must change trains at this station.

The station is also the departure point of an aerial tramway to the summit of Mount Daishi.

=== Limited express services ===
- Kounotori: Shin-Osaka - Kinosaki Onsen (via the Fukuchiyama Line)
- Kinosaki: Kyoto - Kinosaki Onsen (via the San'in Main Line)
- Hamakaze: Osaka - Kasumi, Hamasaka, Tottori (via the Bantan Line)

== Station layout ==
The station consists of two side platforms and one island platform serving four tracks at ground level. The platforms are connected by a footbridge, and the station has a Midori no Madoguchi staffed ticket office. Elevator access available on platforms 2, 3 & 4.

=== Platforms ===
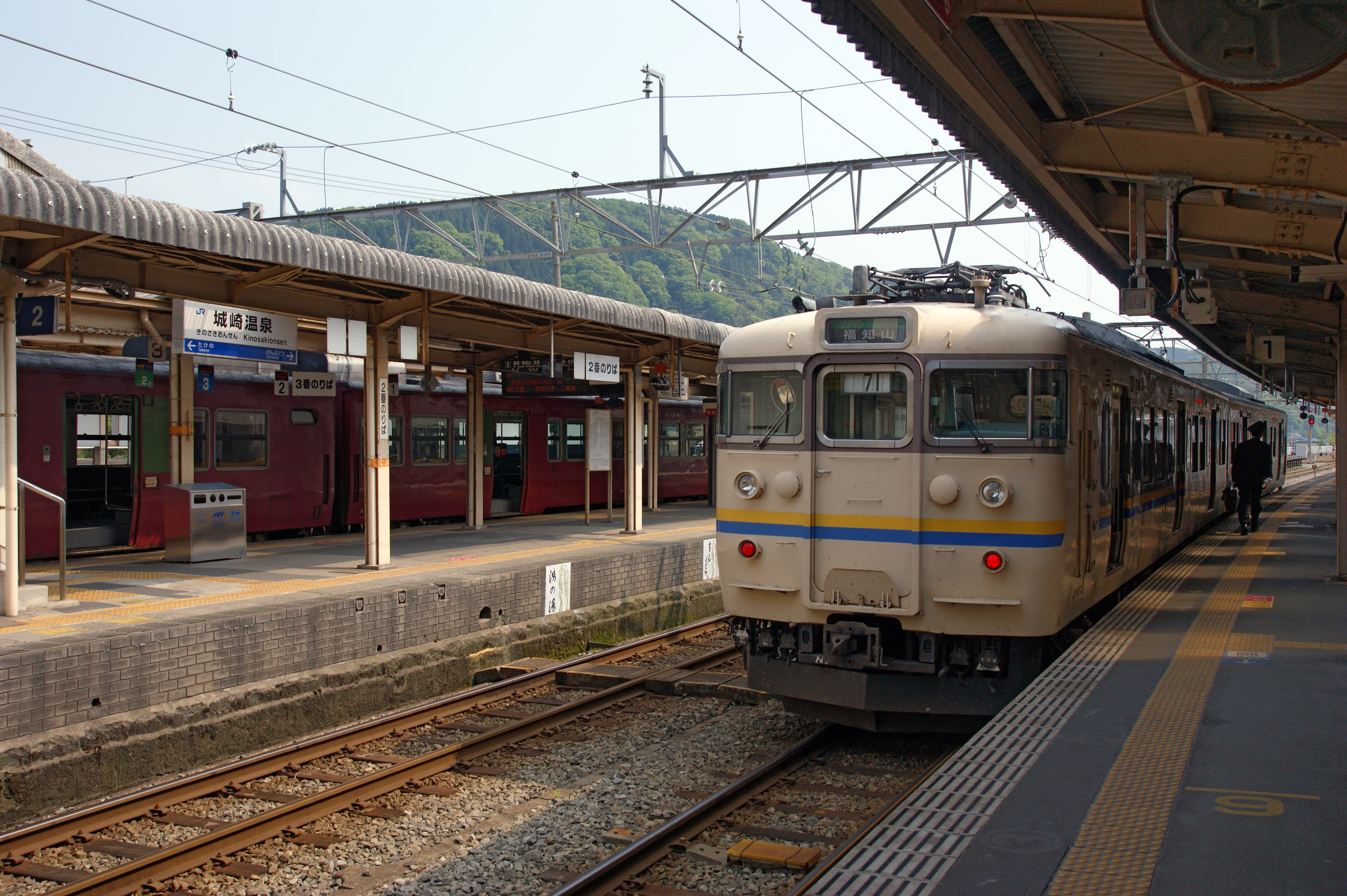
View of the platforms, May 2008

1	■ San'in Main Line	Local trains returning for Toyooka, Wadayama, and Fukuchiyama
2	■ San'in Main Line	mainly used for local trains returning for Hamasaka and Tottori mainly used for local trains from Kasumi for Toyooka
3	■ San'in Main Line	mainly used for limited express trains for Toyooka, Wadayama, Kyoto, and Osaka
4	■ San'in Main Line	local trains and limited express Hamakaze for Hamasaka and Tottori local trains returning for Toyooka, Wadayama, and Fukuchiyama

== Adjacent stations ==
«	Service	»
Sanin Main Line
Toyooka	Limited Express Kounotori	Terminus
Toyooka	Limited Express Kinosaki	Terminus
Toyooka	Limited Express Hamakaze	Takeno
Gembudō	Rapid	Takeno
Gembudō	Local	Takeno

== History ==
The station was opened on 5 September 1909 as Kinosaki Station (城崎駅). It was renamed Kinosaki Onsen Station in 2005.

== Passenger statistics ==
In fiscal 2017, the station was used by an average of 1048 passengers daily.

== Surrounding area ==
- Kinosaki Onsen

== See also ==
- List of railway stations in Japan
