= Hamasaka Station =

Railway station in Shin'onsen, Hyōgo Prefecture, Japan

Hamasaka Station 浜坂駅
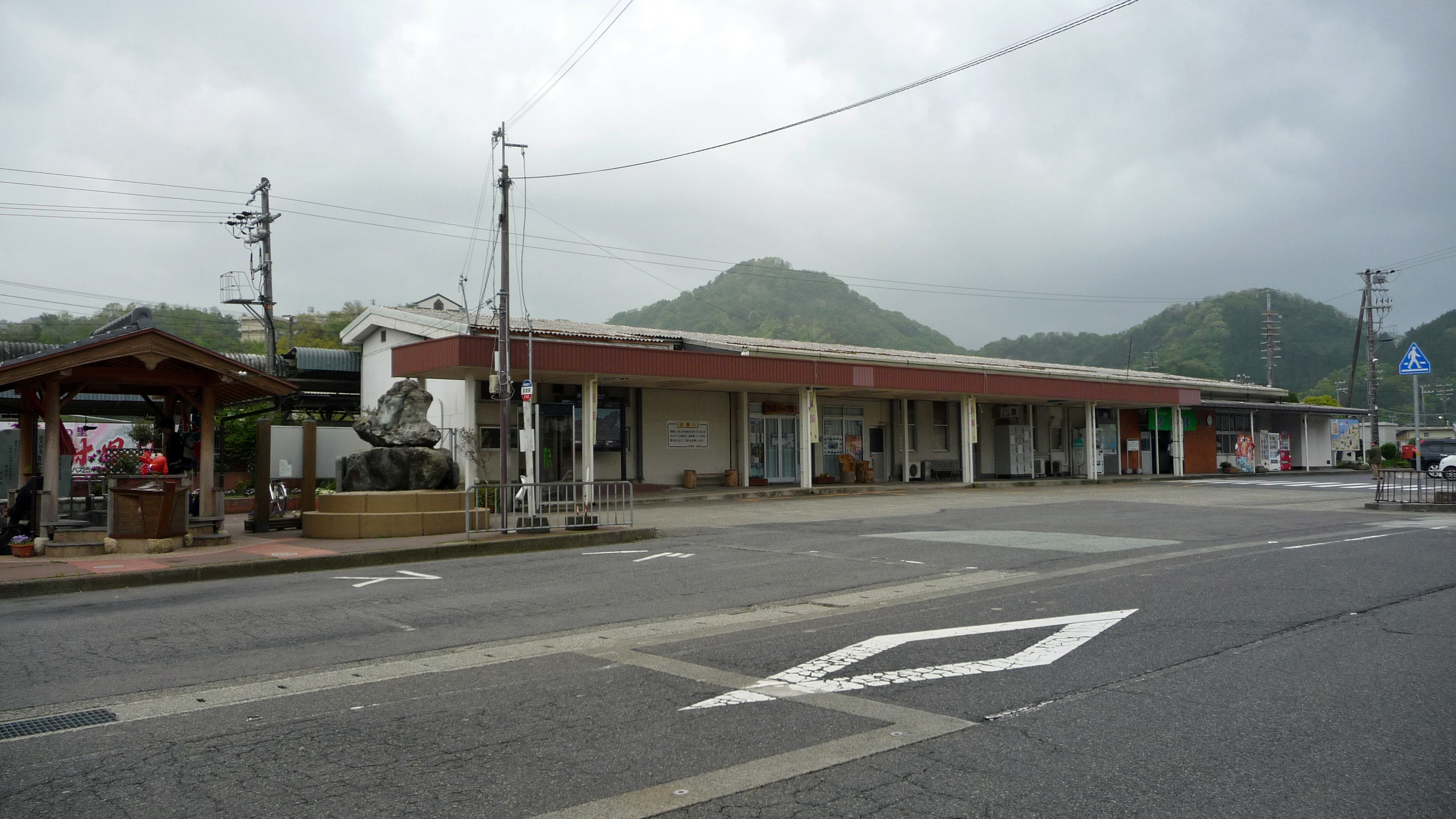
- Hamasaka Station, May 2011

General information
- Location: Hamasaka, Shin'onsen-machi, Mikata-gun, Hyōgo-ken 669-6702; Japan
- Coordinates: 35.6203°N 134.4517°E
- Owner: West Japan Railway Company
- Operator: West Japan Railway Company
- Line: San'in Main Line
- Distance: 197.9 km (123.0 miles) from Kyoto
- Platforms: 1 side + 1 island platform
- Connections: Bus stop

Other information
- Status: Staffed ( Midori no Madoguchi )
- Website: Official website

History
- Opened: 10 November 1911

Passengers
- FY2016: 263 daily
Location
- Location within Hyōgo Prefecture Location within Japan

Hamasaka Station (浜坂駅, Hamasaka-eki) is a passenger railway station located in the town of Shin'onsen, Mikata District, Hyōgo, Japan, operated by West Japan Railway Company (JR West).

== Lines ==
The station is served by the San'in Main Line and is located 197.9 kilometers from the terminus at Kyoto.

== Station layout ==
The station features one ground-level side platform and one ground-level island platform, connected by an underground passage. It also has a Midori no Madoguchi staffed ticket office.

=== Platforms ===
1, 2, 3	■ San'in Main Line	for Kinosaki Onsen and Toyooka for Tottori and Yonago

== Adjacent stations ==
«	Service	»
West Japan Railway Company (JR West) San'in Main Line
Kasumi	Limited Express Hamakaze	Iwami
Kutani	Local	Moroyose

== History ==
Hamasaka Station opened on November 10, 1911.

== Passenger statistics ==
In fiscal 2016, the station was used by an average of 263 passengers daily

== Surrounding area ==
- Shinonsen Town Hall (former Hamasaka Town Hall)
- Hamasaka Onsen

== See also ==
- List of railway stations in Japan
