= Nakahama Station =

Railway station in Sakaminato, Tottori Prefecture, Japan

Nakahama Station 中浜駅
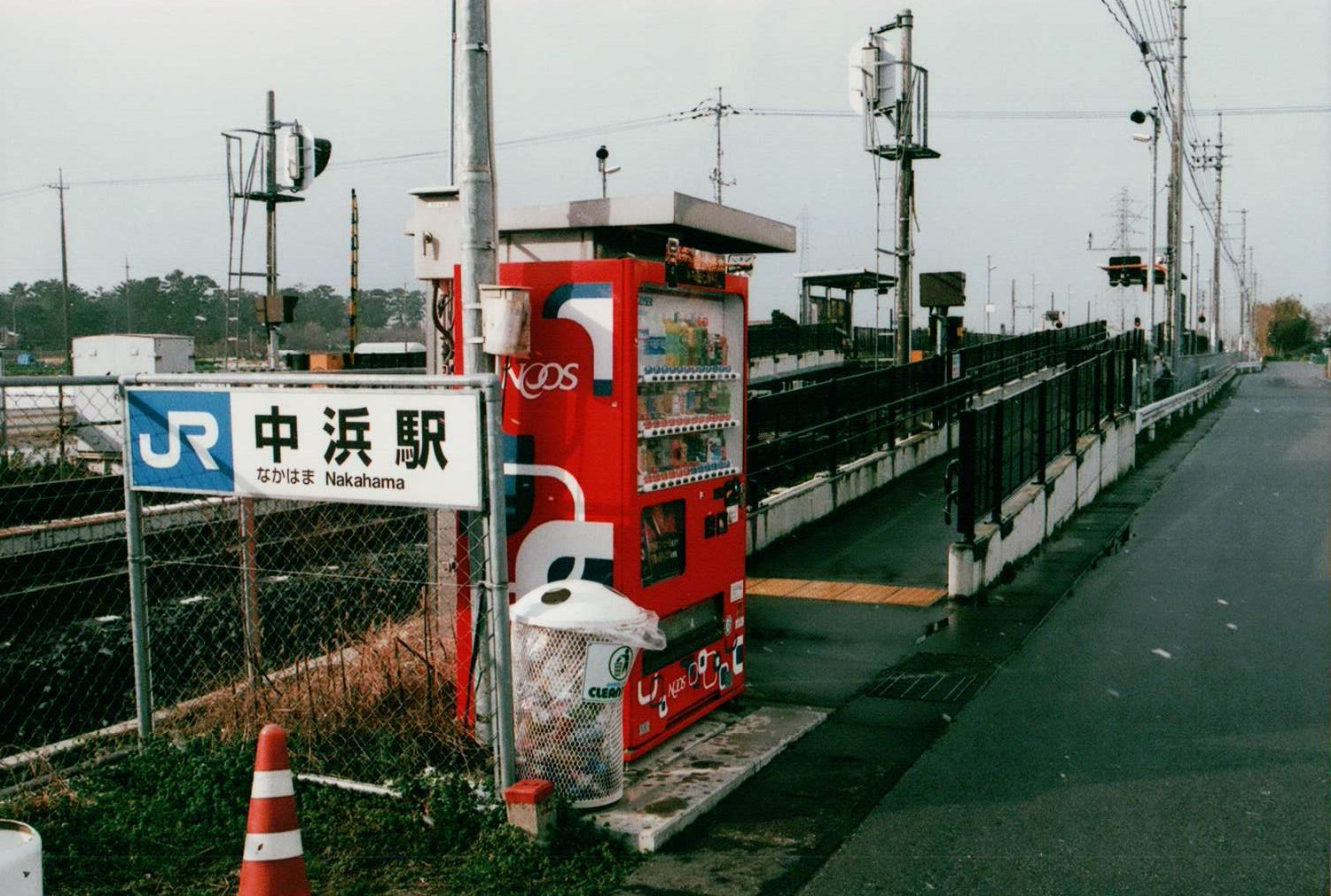
- Nakahama Station

General information
- Location: 978, Koshinozu-chō, Sakaiminato-shi, Tottori-ken 684-0053; Japan
- Coordinates: 35°30′24.74″N 133°14′41.18″E
- Operator: JR West
- Line: C Sakai Line
- Distance: 13.2 km (8.2 miles) from Yonago
- Platforms: 1 side platform
- Tracks: 1

Construction
- Structure type: At grade

Other information
- Status: Unstaffed
- Website: Official website

History
- Opened: 1 July 1952

Passengers
- 2018: 102 daily
Location
- Location within Tottori Prefecture Location within Japan

Nakahama Station (中浜駅, Nakahama-eki) is a passenger railway station located in the city of Sakaiminato, Tottori Prefecture, Japan. It is operated by the West Japan Railway Company (JR West).

== Lines ==
Nakahama Station is served by the Sakai Line, and is located 13.2 kilometers from the terminus of the line at Yonago.

== Station layout ==
The station consists of two opposed ground-level side platforms connected by a level crossing. There is no station building, and station is unattended.

=== Platforms ===
1	■ C Sakai Line	for Yonago
2	■ C Sakai Line	for Sakaiminato

== Adjacent stations ==
«	Service	»
Sakai Line
Yonago Airport	Rapid	Amariko
Yonago Airport	Local	Takamatsuchō

== History ==
Nakahama Station opened on July 1, 1952.

== Passenger statistics ==
In fiscal 2018, the station was used by an average of 102 passengers daily.

== Surrounding area ==
- Miho-Yonago Airport - about 900 meters, 15 minutes on foot.
- Sakaiminato Municipal Nakahama Elementary School

== See also ==
- List of railway stations in Japan
