= Sarugahana Caves =

Archaeological site in Matsue, Japan

- サルガ鼻洞窟住居跡 (Japanese)
- Sarugahana caves Sarugahana Caves (Japan)
- Interactive map of Sarugahana Caves
- 35°31′55″N 133°11′43″E
- Periods: Jōmon to Kofun period
- Location: Matsue, Shimane, Japan
- Region: San'in region

Site notes
- Public access: Yes

The Sarugahana Caves (サルガ鼻洞窟住居跡, Sarugahana dōkutsu jūkyo ato) is an archaeological site consisting of a cave dwelling in the Mihonoseki-cho neighborhood of the city of Matsue, Shimane Prefecture in the San'in region of Japan. The site was designated a National Historic Site of Japan in 1943.

== Overview ==
The Sarugahana Cave is a large sea erosion cave located on the cliffs facing the Nakaumi on the southern coast of the Shimane Peninsula; it consists of four large and small caves. The largest is Cave 1, which is about 60 meters deep and about 5 meters high and wide. From well-preserved stratigraphic layers in this cave, early to late fragments of Jomon pottery, Yayoi pottery, and Sue ware pottery have been excavated, indicating continuous occupation for several thousands of years. Among them, the earthenware excavated in large quantities is named 'Sakigahana-style' making this the type site for this style of pottery from the first half of the late Jōmon period. Stone tools include stone axes, stone arrowheads, stone spoons, grinding stones, and more than 200 stone weights have been unearthed. There are also many accessories such as magatama and shell rings, while animal bones from wild boar and Sitka deer, fish bones from sea bream, fugu, and tuna, and bird bones have also been found. In addition, several sets of human bones from the Jōmon period were found in a folded state. The artifacts from this site are kept in the Yakumotatsu Fudoki-no-Oka Museum.

The site is approximately 10 kilometers from Sakaiminato Station on the JR West Sakai Line.

== See also ==
- List of Historic Sites of Japan (Shimane)
