= Amariko Station =

Railway station in Sakaminato, Tottori Prefecture, Japan

Amariko Station 余子駅
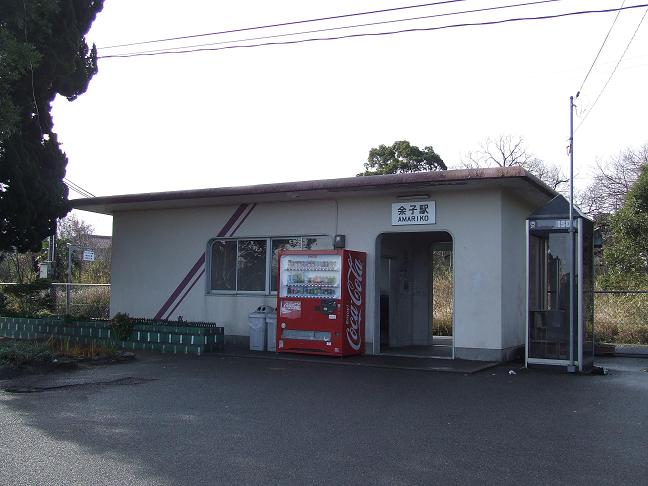
- Station building

General information
- Location: 1503, Takenouchi-chō, Sakaiminato-shi, Tottori-ken 684-0043; Japan
- Coordinates: 35°31′15.94″N 133°14′11.8″E
- Operator: JR West
- Line: C Sakai Line
- Distance: 15.0 km (9.3 miles) from Yonago
- Platforms: 1 side platform
- Tracks: 1

Construction
- Structure type: At grade

Other information
- Status: Unstaffed
- Website: Official website

History
- Opened: 22 December 1932

Passengers
- 2018: 658 daily
Location
- Location within Tottori Prefecture Location within Japan

Amariko Station (余子駅, Amariko-eki) is a passenger railway station located in the city of Sakaiminato, Tottori Prefecture, Japan. It is operated by the West Japan Railway Company (JR West).

== Lines ==
Amariko Station is served by the Sakai Line, and is located 15.0 kilometers from the terminus of the line at Yonago.

== Station layout ==
The station consists of one ground-level side platform locate don then right side of a single bi-directional track when looking in the direction of Sakaiminato. The station is unattended.

== Adjacent stations ==
«	Service	»
Sakai Line
Nakahama	Rapid	Babasakichō
Takamatsuchō	Local	Agarimichi

== History ==
Amariko Station opened on December 22, 1932.

== Passenger statistics ==
In fiscal 2018, the station was used by an average of 658 passengers daily.

== Surrounding area ==
- Tottori Prefectural Sakaiminato Technical High School
- Sakaiminato Second Junior High School
- Sakaiminato Municipal Yoko Elementary School
- Sakaiminato Municipal Seido Elementary School

== See also ==
- List of railway stations in Japan
