= Tottori Domain Battery Sites =

Tottori Domain Battery sites
- 鳥取藩台場跡 (Japanese)
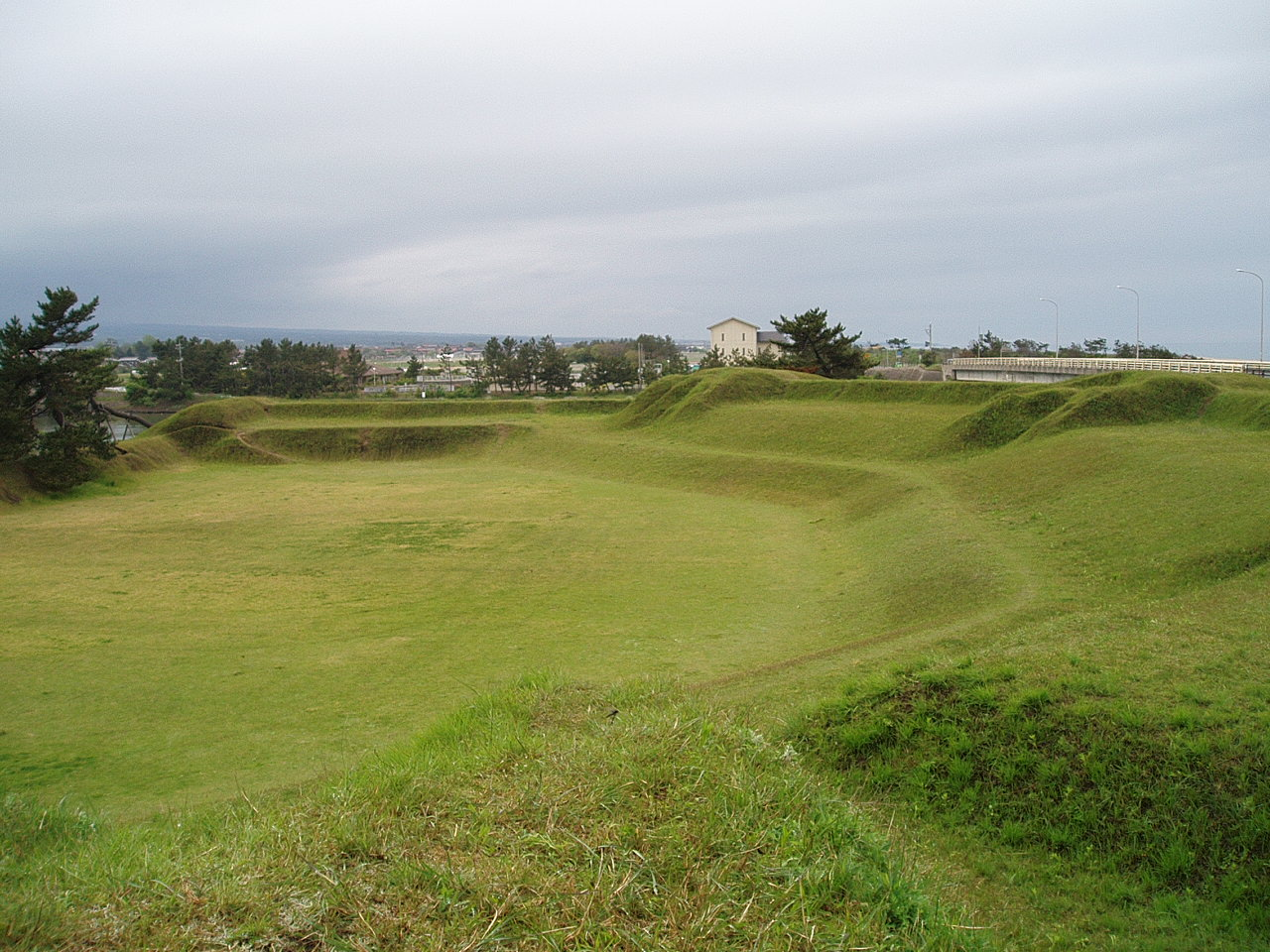
- Yura Battery Site
- Type: fortification
- Location: Sakaiminato, Yonago, Hokuei, Yurihama, Iwami, Kotoura, Tottori, Japan

History
- Built: 1864
- Demolished: 1871
- National Historic Site of Japan Tottori Domain Battery Sites (Tottori Prefecture) Tottori Domain Battery Sites (Japan)

The Tottori Domain Battery Sites (鳥取藩台場跡, Tottori-han Daiba-ato) were a group of eight Bakumatsu period coastal artillery batteries erected by Tottori Domain on the Sea of Japan coast in what is now Tottori Prefecture in the San'in region of northern Japan. The ruins of six of the eight sites remain; four of which were collectively designated a National Historic Site in 1988 with the additional sites added to the designation in 2016.

== Background ==
In the late Edo period, the Tokugawa shogunate was increasingly alarmed by incursions of foreign ships into Japanese territorial waters, fearing that the kurofune warships of the United States or other Western powers would attempt to end Japan's self-imposed national isolation policy by force, or attempt an invasion of Japan. Numerous feudal domains were ordered to establish fortifications along their coastlines, with shore artillery located at strategic locations. The daimyō of Tottori Domain, Ikeda Yoshinori was the fifth son of Tokugawa Nariaki of Mito Domain and at the time was a hard-line supporter of the sonnō jōi movement as promoted by the Mitogaku school of politics, and also an advocate of military modernization along western lines.

== Yura Daiba ruins ==
The Yura Daiba ruins (由良台場跡) are located in the Yura neighborhood of the town of Hokuei. This was the first coastal gun battery built by Tottori Domain, and was influenced by French military design. Completed in 1864, it has a trapezoidal shape measuring about 125 meters from east-to-west and about 83 meters from north-to-south. The remains of an earthen mound with a height of about 5 meters are almost completely preserved. The site held one 60-inch, 24-inch, 15-inch, and 5-inch guns, which had been manufactured by Tottori Domain at the Mutsuo reverberatory furnace. The site is about a 20-minute walk from Yura Station on the JR West San'in Main Line.

== Sakai Daiba ruins ==
The Sakai Daiba ruins (境台場跡) are located in the Hanamachi neighbourhood of the city of Sakaiminato, Tottori, and were completed in 1864. It is a three-tiered trapezoidal earthwork with a height of about 6 meters and a width of about 25 meters. A total of eight guns were deployed, including two 18-inch guns, one 6-inch gun, and five 5-inch guns, manufactured at the Mutsuo reverberatory furnace. The site is now Sakaidaiba Park, and is about a 30-minute walk from Sakaiminato Station on the JR West Sakai Line.

== Yodoe Daiba ruins ==
The Yodoe Daiba ruins (淀江台場跡) are located in the Yodoe neighborhood of the city of Yonago, facing Yodoe Port, and was completed in 1863. At present, the earthworks have a height of about 4 meters, a width of about 24 meters, and a length of about 67 meters remain. The site contained an 18-inch gun, a 6-inch gun, and a 5-inch gun, manufactured at the Mutsuo reverberatory furnace. The site is about a 15-minute walk from Yodoe Station on the JR San'in Main Line.

== Hashizu Daiba ruins ==
The Hashizu Daiba ruins (橋津台場跡) are located in the Wainagase neighborhood of the town of Yurihama. The fortification had a symmetrical plan, but now only part of the earthwork on both wings, the rear earthwork, and the blind earthworks remain. The fortification was equipped with one 18-inch, 6-inch, 3-inch, and 5-inch cannons manufactured at the Mutsuo reverberatory furnace. The site can be reached by bus from Kurayoshi Station on the JR San'in Main Line.

== Uradome Daiba ruins ==
The Uradome Daiba ruins (浦富台場跡) is the only remaining fortification in the Inaba side of Tottori Domain, all of the previous fortifications being located in former Hōki Province. The Uradome Daiba was located in the town of Iwami. The fortifications measure about 100 meters from east-to-west, and the earthworks are about 10 meters wide and about 3 meters high. It was equipped with four cannons, including a 12-inch gun, a 6-inch gun, and a 5-inch gun. Currently, the site is maintained as Uradome Odaiba Park, and can be reached by bus from Iwami Station on the JR San'in Main Line.

== Akasaki Daiba ruins ==
The Akasaki Daiba ruins (赤崎台場跡) were built in 1853. It is the only semi-circular battery among the Tottori sites. At the time of its construction, Tottori Domain was low on funds, so it was largely built with donations from the local village headman, and labor provided by surrounding villagers. Much of the site was destroyed by the construction of Japan National Route 9 in 1958; however, excavations in 2013 and 2014 found that the semi-circular portion of the fortification survived. It was added to the National Historic Site designation in 2016.

== See also ==
- List of Historic Sites of Japan (Tottori)
