= Wadahama Station =

Railway station in Yonago, Tottori Prefecture, Japan

Wadahama Station 和田浜駅
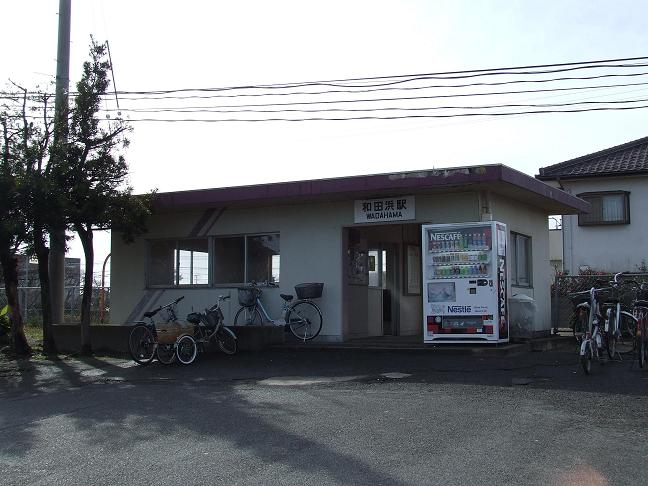
- Wadahama Station, January 2008

General information
- Location: 1189, Wada-chō, Yonago-shi, Tottori-ken 683-0102; Japan
- Coordinates: 35°28′50.6″N 133°15′56.35″E
- Operator: JR West
- Line: C Sakai Line
- Distance: 9.7 km (6.0 miles) from Yonago
- Platforms: 1 side platform
- Tracks: 1

Construction
- Structure type: At grade

Other information
- Status: Unstaffed
- Website: Official website

History
- Opened: 1 November 1951

Passengers
- 2018: 200 daily

Services
Preceding station	JR West	Following station
Ōshinozuchō towards Sakaiminato	Sakai Line Local	Yumigahama towards Yonago
Location
- Location within Tottori Prefecture Location within Japan

Wadahama Station (和田浜駅, Wadahama-eki) is a passenger railway station located in the city of Yonago, Tottori Prefecture, Japan. It is operated by the West Japan Railway Company (JR West).

== Lines ==
Wadahama Station is served by the Sakai Line, and is located 9.7 kilometers from the terminus of the line at Yonago.

== Station layout ==
The station consists of one ground-level side platform located on the right side of the tracks when facing in the direction of Sakaiminato. The station is unattended.

== History ==
Wadahama Station opened on November 1, 1951.

== Passenger statistics ==
In fiscal 2018, the station was used by an average of 200 passengers daily.

== Surrounding area ==
- Wadahama Industrial Park
- Japan Racing Association (JRA) Winds Yonago (Off-course betting facilities of JRA)

== See also ==
- List of railway stations in Japan
