= Fujimichō Station (Tottori) =

Railway station in Yonago, Tottori Prefecture, Japan

Fujimichō Station 富士見町駅
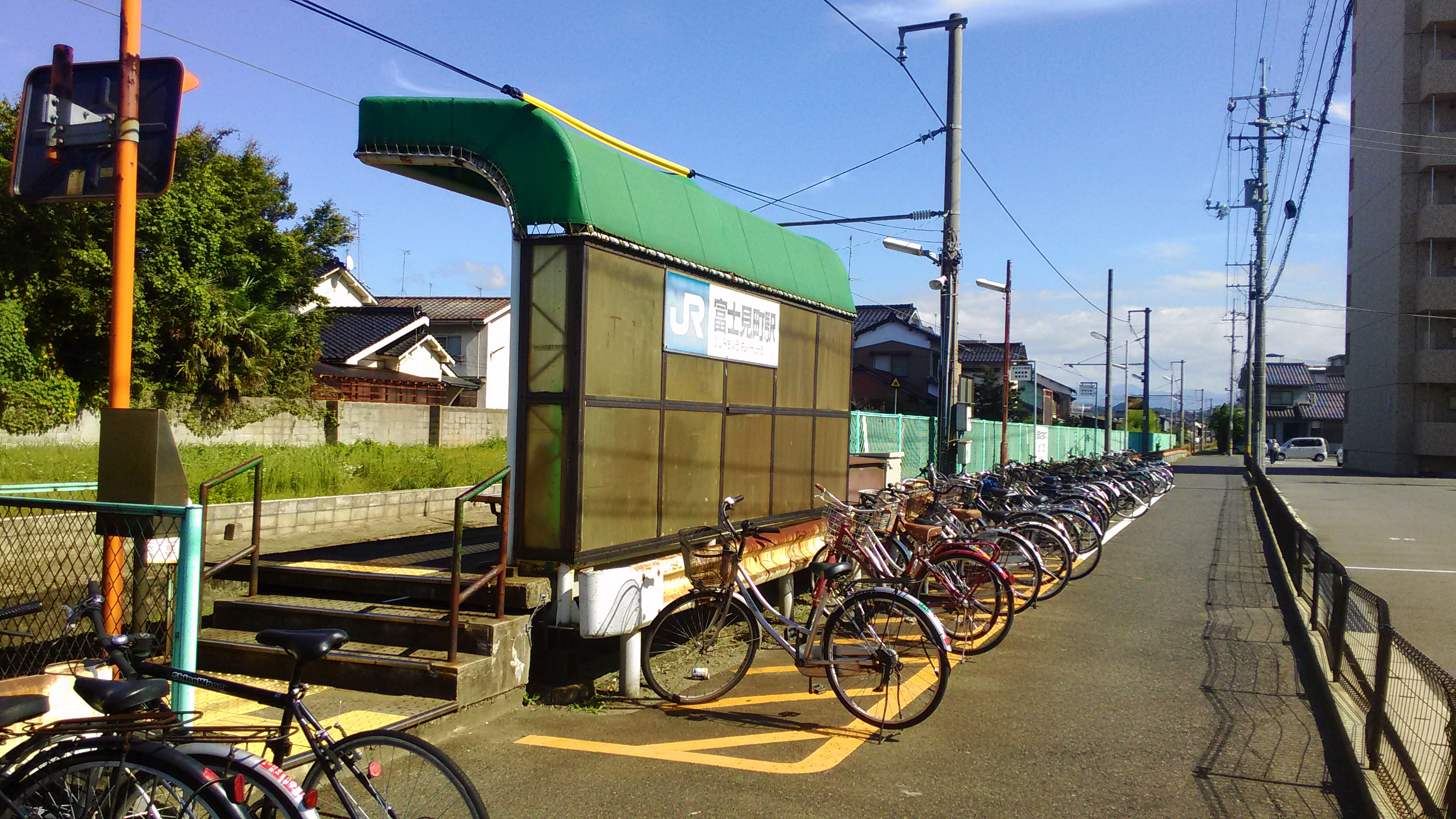
- Fujimichō Station, September 2015

General information
- Location: 170, Fujimi-chō, Yonago-shi, Tottori-ken 683-0055; Japan
- Coordinates: 35°26′5.31″N 133°20′11.15″E
- Operator: JR West
- Line: C Sakai Line
- Distance: 3.3 km (2.1 miles) from Yonago
- Platforms: 1 side platform
- Tracks: 1

Construction
- Structure type: At grade

Other information
- Status: Unstaffed
- Website: Official website

History
- Opened: 1 November 1987

Passengers
- 2018: 306 daily

Services
Preceding station	JR West	Following station
Gotō towards Sakaiminato	Sakai Line Local	Bakurōmachi towards Yonago
Location
- Location within Tottori Prefecture Location within Japan

Fujimichō Station (富士見町駅, Fujimichō-eki) is a passenger railway station located in the city of Yonago, Tottori Prefecture, Japan. It is operated by the West Japan Railway Company (JR West).

== Lines ==
Fujimichō Station is served by the Sakai Line, and is located 1.5 kilometers from the terminus of the line at Yonago. The distance between stations to the next station, Bakurōmachi Station, is officially 0.5 km in rail kilometers, but the actual distance (actual km) is about 420 meters, which is the shortest distance between stations on all JR lines.

== Station layout ==
The station consists of one ground-level side platform located on the left side of the single bi-directional track when facing in the direction of Sakaiminato. There is no station building and the station is unattended.

== History ==
Fujimichō Station opened on 1 November 1987.

== Passenger statistics ==
In fiscal 2018, the station was used by an average of 306 passengers daily.

== Surrounding area ==
- West Japan Railway Company Gotō Factory
- Route 9
- Route 181
- Route 183
- Route 482
- Broadcasting System of San-in

== See also ==
- List of railway stations in Japan
