= Sambommatsuguchi Station =

Railway station in Yonago, Tottori Prefecture, Japan

Sambommatsuguchi Station 三本松口駅
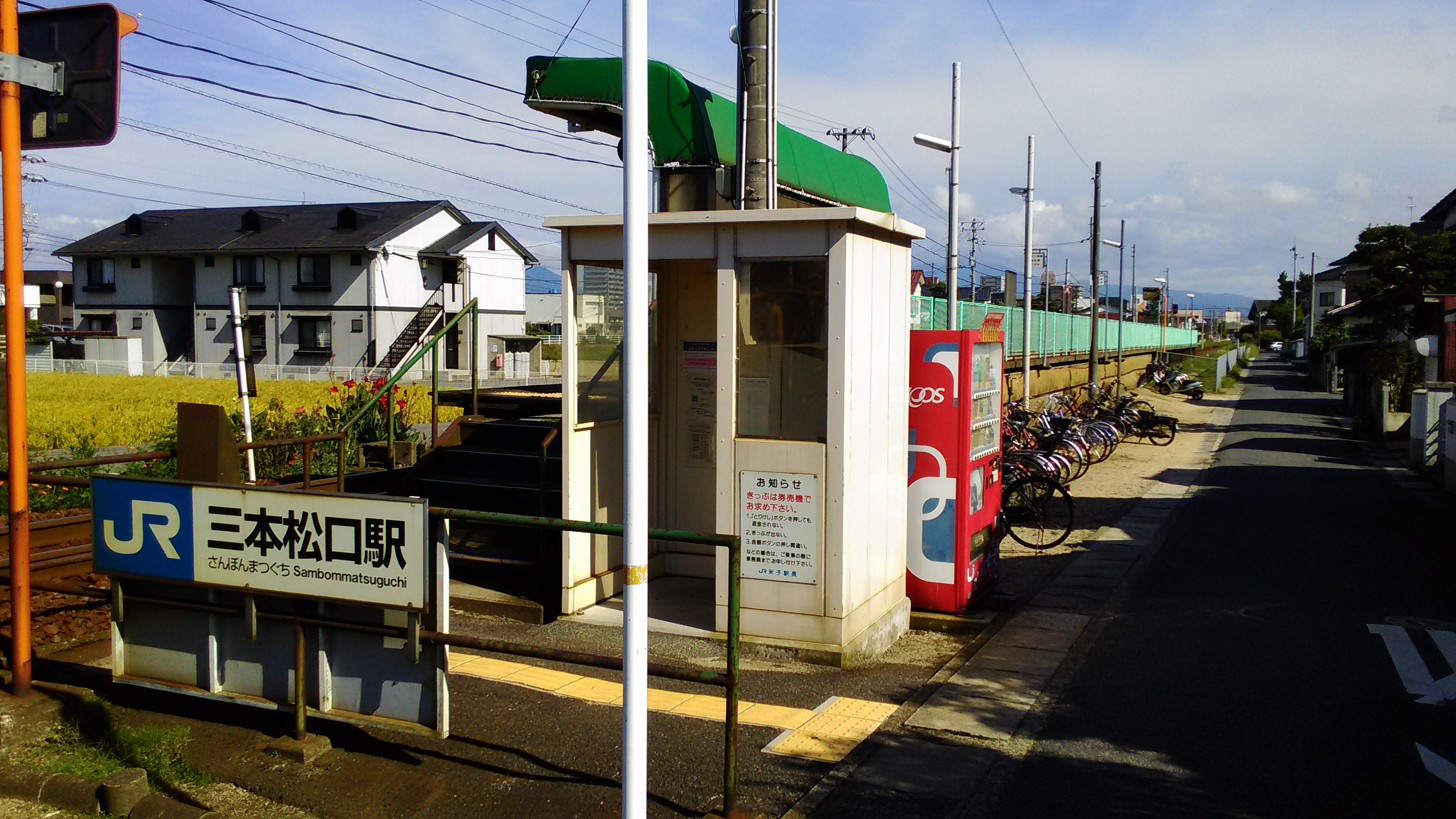
- Sambommatsuguchi Station, September 2015

General information
- Location: 58, Sambommatsu 4-chōme, Yonago-shi, Tottori-ken 683-0842; Japan
- Coordinates: 35°26′46.48″N 133°19′22.4″E
- Operator: JR West
- Line: C Sakai Line
- Distance: 3.3 km (2.1 miles) from Yonago
- Platforms: 1 side platform
- Tracks: 1

Construction
- Structure type: At grade

Other information
- Status: Unstaffed
- Website: Official website

History
- Opened: 1 November 1987

Passengers
- 2018: 392 daily

Services
Preceding station	JR West	Following station
Kawasakiguchi towards Sakaiminato	Sakai Line Local	Gotō towards Yonago
Location
- Location within Tottori Prefecture Location within Japan

Sambommatsuguchi Station (三本松口駅, Sambommatsuguchi-eki) is a passenger railway station located in the city of Yonago, Tottori Prefecture, Japan. It is operated by the West Japan Railway Company (JR West).

== Lines ==
Sambommatsuguchi Station is served by the Sakai Line, and is located 3.3 kilometers from the terminus of the line at Yonago.

== Station layout ==
The station consists of one ground-level side platform located on the right side of the single bi-directional track when facing in the direction of Sakaiminato. There is no station building and the station is unattended.

== History ==
Sambommatsuguchi Station opened on 1 November 1987.

== Passenger statistics ==
In fiscal 2018, the station was used by an average of 392 passengers daily.

== Surrounding area ==
- Yonago Municipal Gotogaoka Junior High School
- Yonago Municipal Sumiyoshi Elementary School

== See also ==
- List of railway stations in Japan
