= Kawasakiguchi Station =

Railway station in Yonago, Tottori Prefecture, Japan

Kawasakiguchi Station 河崎口駅
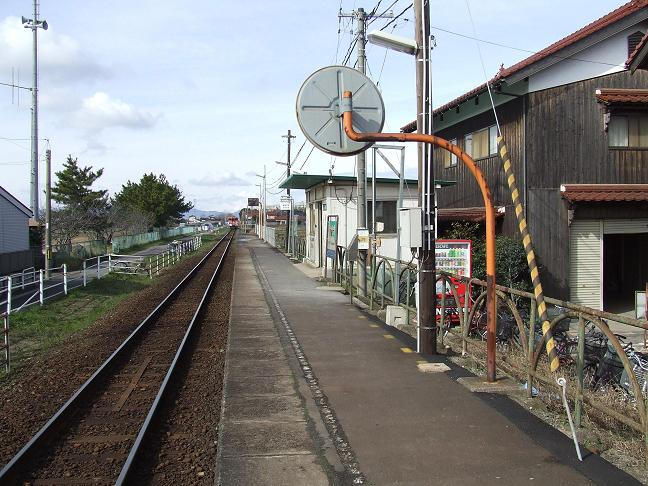
- Platform in 2008

General information
- Location: 2673, Bakurō-machi 1-chōme, Yonago-shi, Tottori-ken 683-0852; Japan
- Coordinates: 35°27′24.32″N 133°18′19.83″E
- Operator: JR West
- Line: C Sakai Line
- Distance: 5.3 km (3.3 miles) from Yonago
- Platforms: 1 side platform
- Tracks: 1

Construction
- Structure type: At grade

Other information
- Status: Unstaffed
- Website: Official website

History
- Opened: 1 July 1952

Passengers
- 2018: 402 daily

Services
Preceding station	JR West	Following station
Yumigahama towards Sakaiminato	Sakai Line Local	Sambommatsuguchi towards Yonago
Location
- Location within Tottori Prefecture Location within Japan

Kawasakiguchi Station (河崎口駅, Kawasakiguchi-eki) is a passenger railway station located in the city of Yonago, Tottori Prefecture, Japan. It is operated by the West Japan Railway Company (JR West).

== Lines ==
Kawasakiguchi Station is served by the Sakai Line, and is located 5.3 kilometers from the terminus of the line at Yonago.

== Station layout ==
The station consists of one ground-level side platform located on the right side of a single bidirectional track when facing in the direction of Sakaiminato. There is no station building, and the station is unattended.

== History ==
Kawasakiguchi Station opened on July 1, 1952.

== Passenger statistics ==
In fiscal 2018, the station was used by an average of 406 passengers daily.

== Surrounding area ==
- Yonago Hokuto Junior and Senior High School
- Yonago Municipal Kawasaki Elementary Schoolol

== See also ==
- List of railway stations in Japan
