= 上道 =

上道, meaning ‘to go on the road’, may refer to:

- The Principle, 2019 Chinese web series starring Jacky Heung and Tang Xiaotian
- Sangdo-dong in Seoul, South Korea
- Several stations
  - Agarimichi Station
  - Jōtō Station (Okayama)
  - Sangdo station
