= Yumigahama Station =

Railway station in Yonago, Tottori Prefecture, Japan

Yumigahama Station 弓ヶ浜駅
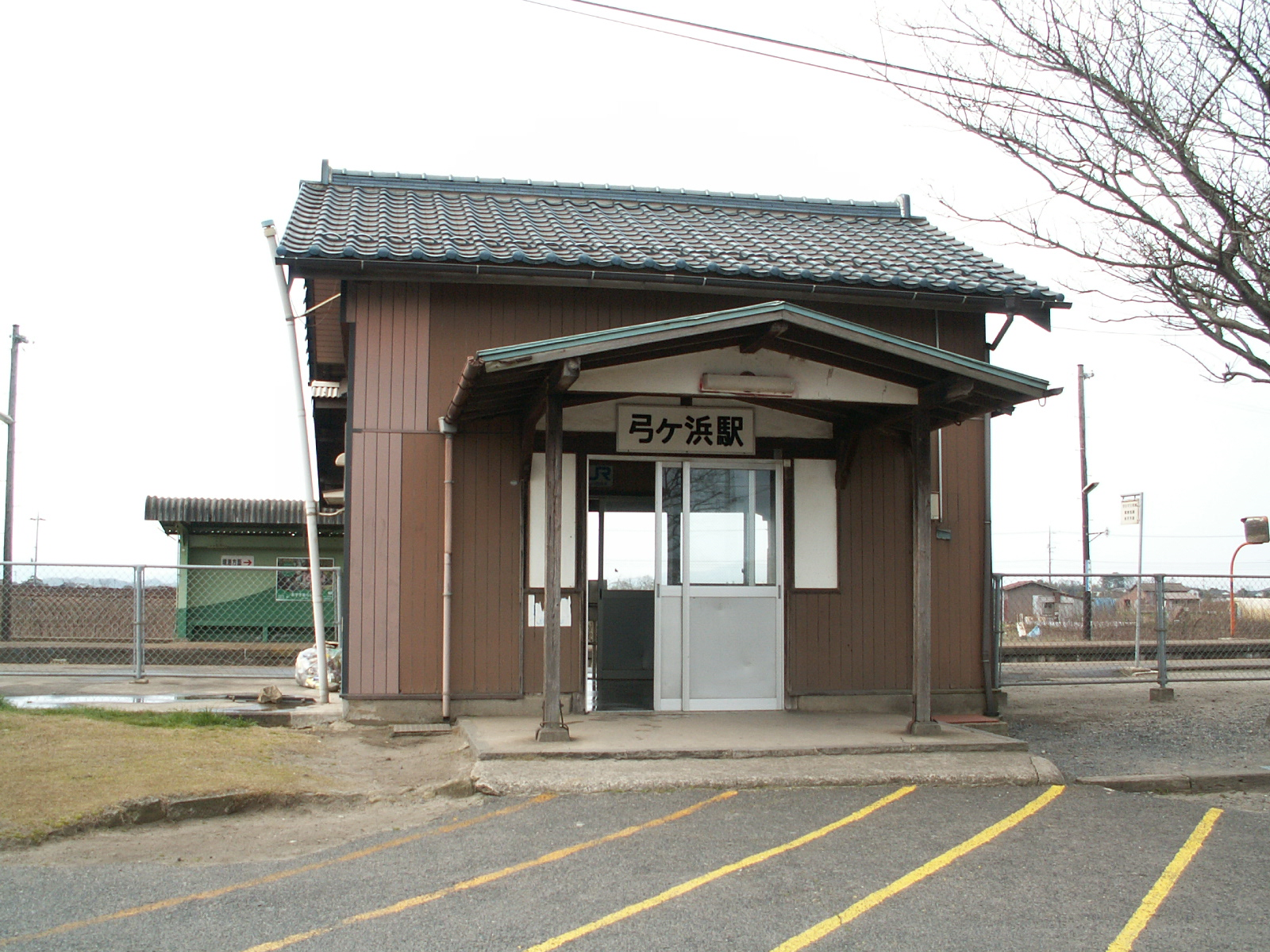
- Yumigahama Station, March 2007

General information
- Location: 1351, Yomi-chō 1-chōme, Yonago-shi, Tottori-ken 683-0851; Japan
- Coordinates: 35°28′1.24″N 133°17′18.1″E
- Operator: JR West
- Line: C Sakai Line
- Distance: 7.2 km (4.5 miles) from Yonago
- Platforms: 2 side platforms
- Tracks: 2

Construction
- Structure type: At grade

Other information
- Status: Unstaffed
- Website: Official website

History
- Opened: 1 July 1917

Passengers
- 2018: 664 daily
Location
- Location within Tottori Prefecture Location within Japan

Yumigahama Station (弓ヶ浜駅, Yumigahama-eki) is a passenger railway station located in the city of Yonago, Tottori Prefecture, Japan. It is operated by the West Japan Railway Company (JR West).

== Lines ==
Yumigahama Station is served by the Sakai Line, and is located 7.2 kilometers from the terminus of the line at Yonago.

== Station layout ==
The station consists of two opposed ground-level side platforms connected by a level crossing. The station is unattended.

=== Platforms ===
1	■ C Sakai Line	for Gotō and Yonago
2	■ C Sakai Line	for Sakaiminato

== Adjacent stations ==
«	Service	»
Sakai Line
Gotō	Rapid	Yonago Airport
Kawasakiguchi	Local	Wadahama

== History ==
Yumigahama Station opened on July 1, 1917.

== Passenger statistics ==
In fiscal 2018, the station was used by an average of 664 passengers daily.

== Surrounding area ==
- Yonago Municipal Yumigahama Junior High School
- Yonago Municipal Yumigahama Elementary School

== See also ==
- List of railway stations in Japan
