= Takamatsuchō Station =

Railway station in Sakaminato, Tottori Prefecture, Japan

Takamatsuchō Station 高松町駅
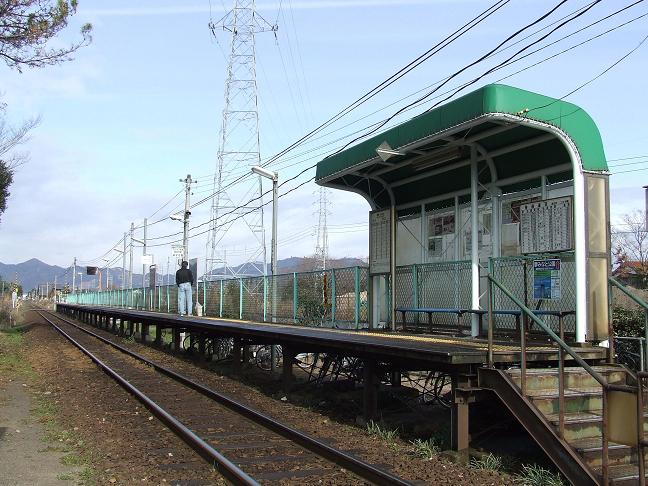
- Takamatsuchō Station

General information
- Location: 574, Takamatsu-chō, Sakaiminato-shi, Tottori-ken 684-0045; Japan
- Coordinates: 35°30′54.12″N 133°14′24.23″E
- Operator: JR West
- Line: C Sakai Line
- Distance: 14.3 km (8.9 miles) from Yonago
- Platforms: 1 side platform
- Tracks: 1

Construction
- Structure type: At grade

Other information
- Status: Unstaffed
- Website: Official website

History
- Opened: 1 November 1987

Passengers
- 2018: 90 daily

Services
Preceding station	JR West	Following station
Amariko towards Sakaiminato	Sakai Line Local	Nakahama towards Yonago
Location
- Location within Tottori Prefecture Location within Japan

Takamatsuchō Station (高松町駅, Takamatsuchō-eki) is a passenger railway station located in the city of Sakaiminato, Tottori Prefecture, Japan. It is operated by the West Japan Railway Company (JR West).

== Lines ==
Takamatsuchō Station is served by the Sakai Line, and is located 14.3 kilometers from the terminus of the line at Yonago.

== Station layout ==
The station consists of one ground-level side platform located on the left side of a single bi-directional track when facing in the direction of Sakaiminato. There is no station building and the station is unattended.

== History ==
Takamatsuchō Station opened on 1 November 1987.

== Passenger statistics ==
In fiscal 2018, the station was used by an average of 90 passengers daily.

== Surrounding area ==
- Yumeminato Park

== See also ==
- List of railway stations in Japan
