= Yonago Airport Station =

Railway station in Sakaminato, Tottori Prefecture, Japan

Yonago Airport Station 米子空港駅
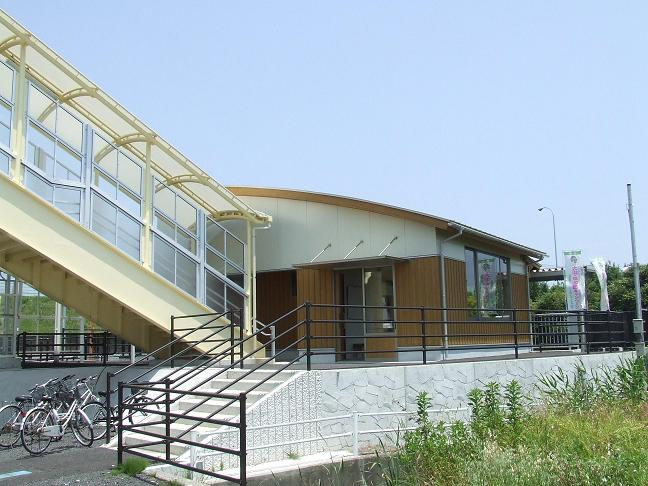
- Yonago Airport Station in June 2010

General information
- Location: 744 Sainokami-chō, Sakaiminato-shi, Tottori-ken 684-0055; Japan
- Coordinates: 35°30′7.23″N 133°14′52.13″E
- Operator: JR West
- Line: C Sakai Line
- Distance: 12.7 km (7.9 miles) from Yonago
- Platforms: 1 side platform
- Tracks: 1
- Connections: Bus stop; Miho-Yonago Airport

Construction
- Structure type: At grade

Other information
- Status: Unstaffed
- Website: Official website

History
- Opened: 1 November 1902
- Former names: Ōshinozu (until 2008)

Passengers
- 2018: 388 daily
Location
- Location within Tottori Prefecture Location within Japan

Yonago Airport Station (米子空港駅, Yonago Kūkō-eki) is a passenger railway station located in the city of Sakaiminato, Tottori Prefecture, Japan. It is operated by the West Japan Railway Company (JR West). The station is within walking distance of the Yonago Airport terminal.

== Lines ==
Yonago Airport Station is served by the Sakai Line, and is located 12.7 kilometers from the terminus of the line at Yonago.

== Station layout ==
The station consists of one ground-level side platform located on the left side of the tracks when facing in the direction of Sakaiminato. The station is unattended.

== Adjacent stations ==
«	Service	»
Sakai Line
Yumigahama	Rapid	Nakahama
Ōshinozuchō	Local	Nakahama

== History ==
The station opened on November 1, 1902, as Ōshinozu Station (大篠津駅). The station was moved to the present location and renamed Yonago Airport Station on June 15, 2008, when the line was rerouted for the expansion of Yonago Airport.

== Passenger statistics ==
In fiscal 2018, the station was used by an average of 388 passengers daily.

== Surrounding area ==
- Miho-Yonago Airport

== See also ==
- List of railway stations in Japan
