= Babasakichō Station =

Railway station in Sakaminato, Tottori Prefecture, Japan

Babasakichō Station 馬場崎町駅
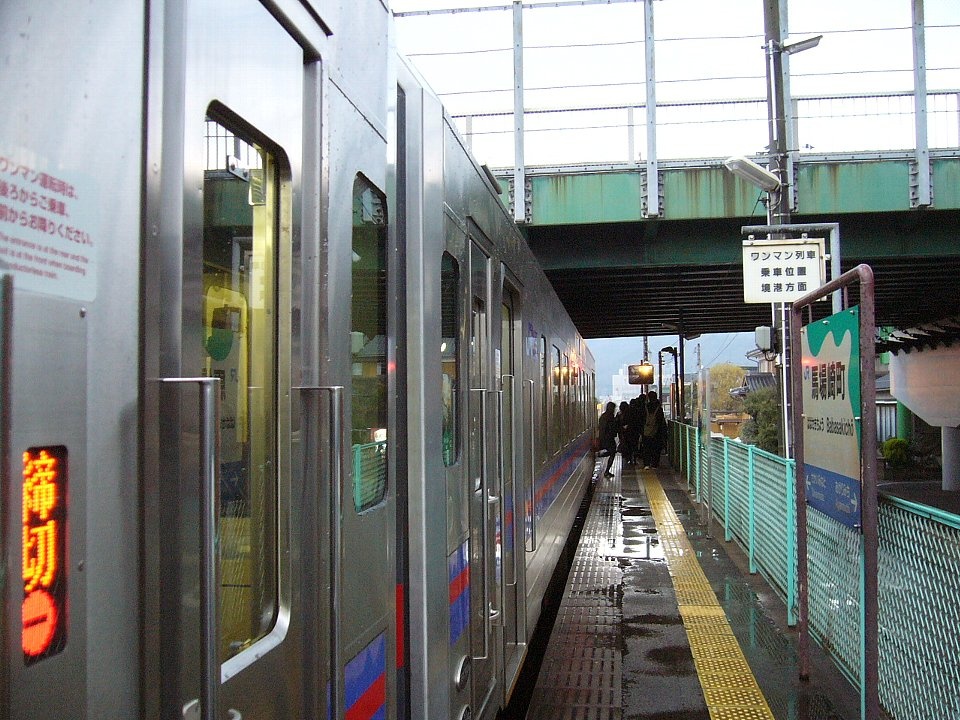
- Babasakichō Station

General information
- Location: 303, Babasaki-chō, Sakaiminato-shi, Tottori-ken 684-0021; Japan
- Coordinates: 35°32′19.27″N 133°13′35.1″E
- Operator: JR West
- Line: C Sakai Line
- Distance: 17.2 km (10.7 miles) from Yonago
- Platforms: 1 side platform
- Tracks: 1

Construction
- Structure type: At grade

Other information
- Status: Unstaffed
- Website: Official website

History
- Opened: 1 November 1987

Passengers
- 2018: 460 daily
Location
- Location within Tottori Prefecture Location within Japan

Babasakichō Station (馬場崎町駅, Babasakichō-eki) is a passenger railway station located in the city of Sakaiminato, Tottori Prefecture, Japan. It is operated by the West Japan Railway Company (JR West).

== Lines ==
Babasakichō Station is served by the Sakai Line, and is located 17.2 kilometers from the terminus of the line at Yonago.

== Station layout ==
The station consists of one ground-level side platform locate don then right side of a single bi-directional track when looking in the direction of Sakaiminato. The station is unattended.

== Adjacent stations ==
«	Service	»
Sakai Line
Amariko	Rapid	Sakaiminato
Agarimichi	Local	Sakaiminato

== History ==
Babasakichō Station opened on 1 November 1987.

== Passenger statistics ==
In fiscal 2018, the station was used by an average of 460 passengers daily.

== Surrounding area ==
- Sakaiminato City Hall
- Tottori Prefectural Sakai High School
- Sakaiminato Municipal Kamimichi Elementary School
- Tottori Saiseikai Sakaiminato General Hospital

== See also ==
- List of railway stations in Japan
