= Gotō Station =

Railway station in Yonago, Tottori Prefecture, Japan

Gotō Station 後藤駅
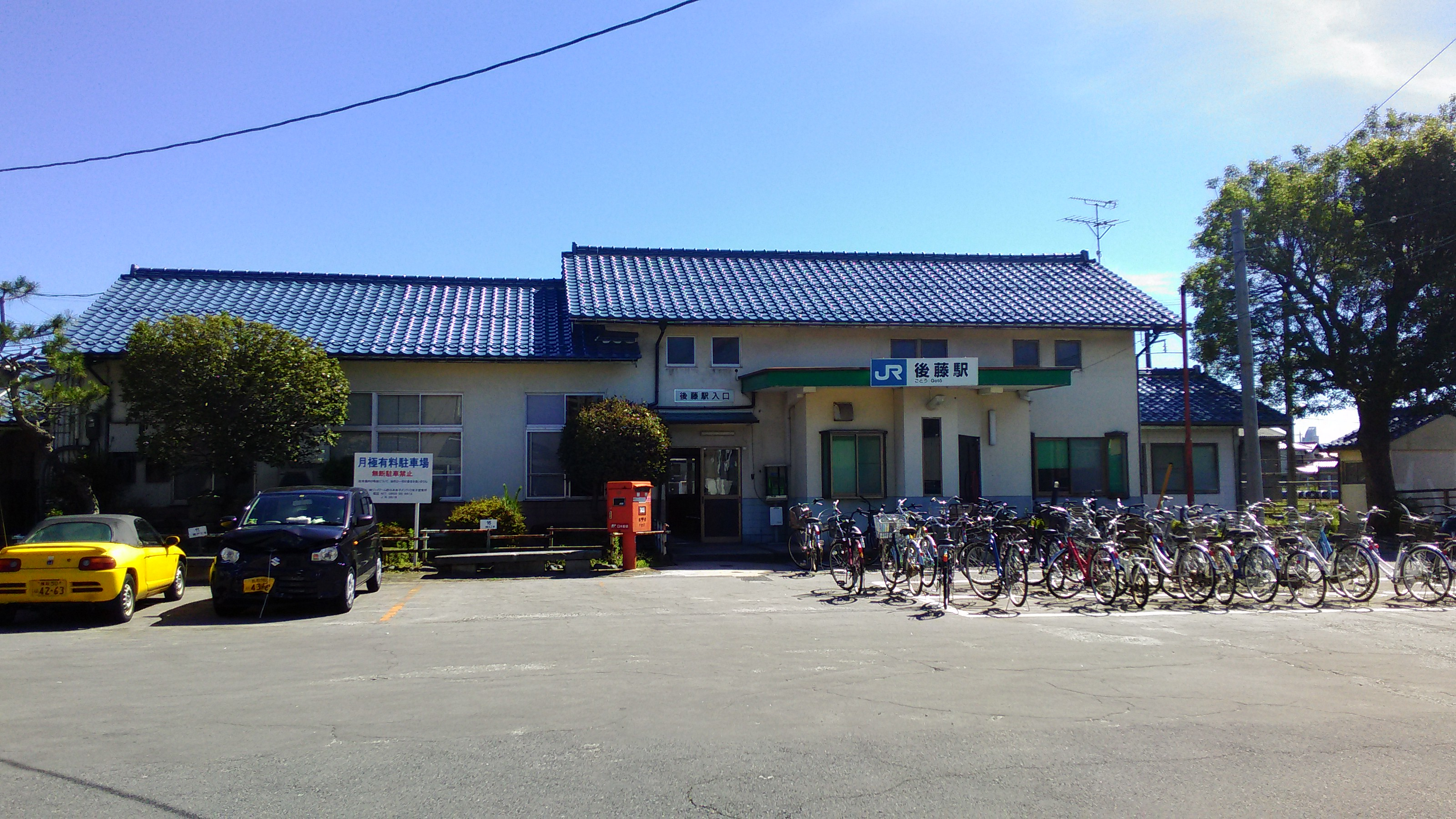
- Gotō Station, July 2015

General information
- Location: 1460, Yonehara, Yonago-shi, Tottori-ken 683-0804; Japan
- Coordinates: 35°26′22.4″N 133°19′53.5″E
- Operator: JR West
- Line: C Sakai Line
- Distance: 3.3 km (2.1 miles) from Yonago
- Platforms: 1 island platform
- Tracks: 2

Construction
- Structure type: At grade

Other information
- Status: Unstaffed
- Website: Official website

History
- Opened: 1 November 1902

Passengers
- 2018: 866 daily
Location
- Location within Tottori Prefecture Location within Japan

Gotō Station (後藤駅, Gotō-eki) is a passenger railway station located in the city of Yonago, Tottori Prefecture, Japan. It is operated by the West Japan Railway Company (JR West).

== Lines ==
Gotō Station is served by the Sakai Line, and is located 2.2 kilometers from the terminus of the line at Yonago.

== Station layout ==
The station consists of one ground-level island platform connected to the station building by a level crossing. One side of the platform is for electrified trains, and the other for diesel. There is a train maintenance factory and railyard next to the station.

=== Platforms ===
1	■ C Sakai Line	for Sakaiminato
2	■ C Sakai Line	for Yonago

== Adjacent stations ==
«	Service	»
Sakai Line
Yonago	Rapid	Yumigahama
Fujimichō	Local	Sambommatsuguchi

== History ==
Gotō Station opened on November 1, 1902.

== Passenger statistics ==
In fiscal 2018, the station was used by an average of 866 passengers daily.

== Surrounding area ==
- Tottori Prefectural Route 245 Ryosanyanagi Goto Station Line

== See also ==
- List of railway stations in Japan
