= Bakurōmachi Station =

Railway station in Yonago, Tottori Prefecture, Japan

Bakurōmachi Station 博労町駅
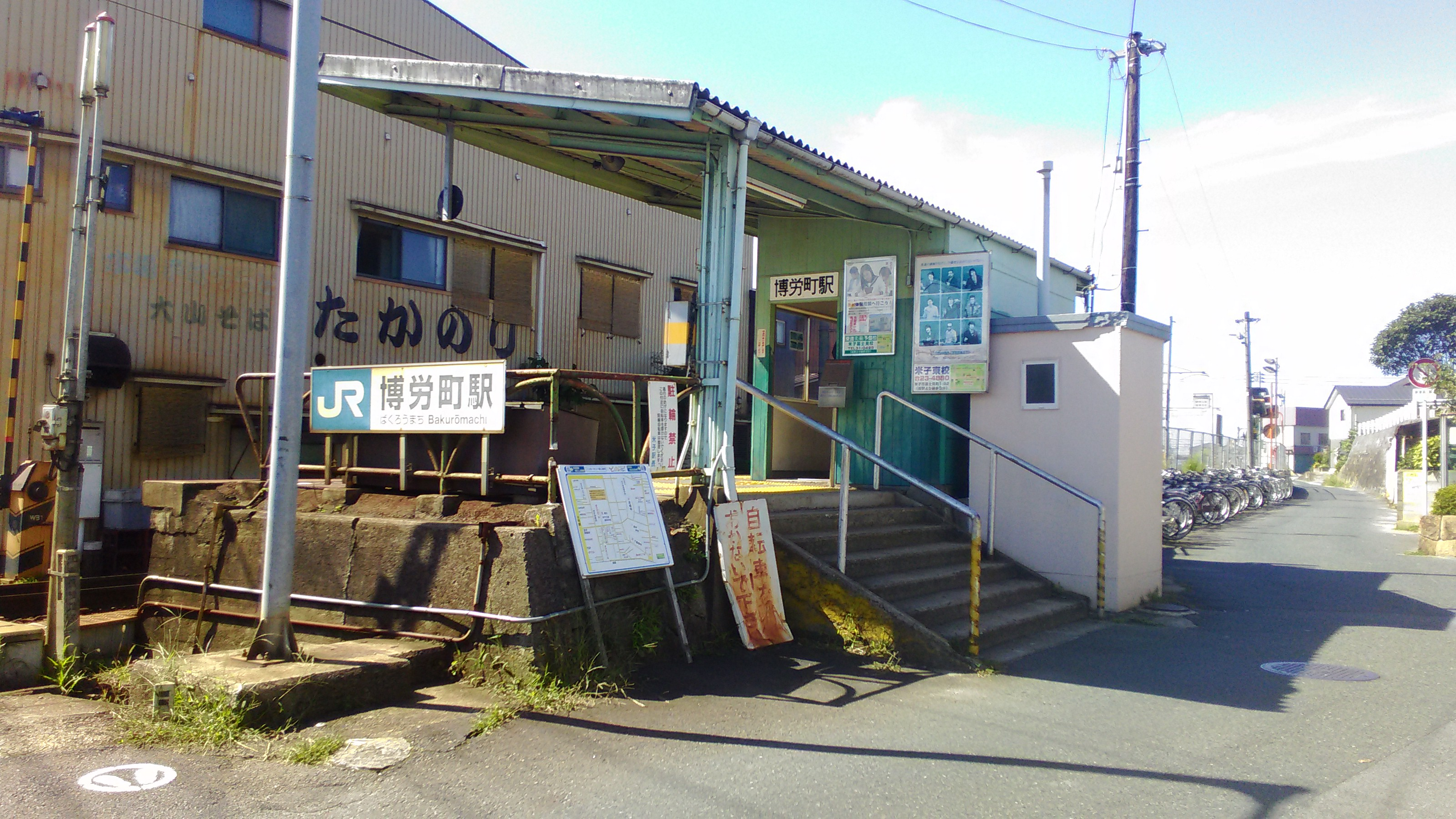
- Bakurōmachi Station, September 2015

General information
- Location: 58, Bakurō-machi 1-chōme, Yonago-shi, Tottori-ken 683-0052; Japan
- Coordinates: 35°25′51.81″N 133°20′24.63″E
- Operator: JR West
- Line: C Sakai Line
- Distance: 1.0 km (0.62 miles) from Yonago
- Platforms: 1 side platform
- Tracks: 1

Construction
- Structure type: At grade

Other information
- Status: Unstaffed
- Website: Official website

History
- Opened: 1 July 1952

Passengers
- 2018: 470 daily

Services
| Preceding station | JR West | Following station |
|---|---|---|
| Fujimichō towards Sakaiminato | Sakai Line Local | Yonago Terminus |
Location
- Location within Tottori Prefecture Location within Japan

Bakurōmachi Station (博労町駅, Bakurōmachi-eki) is a passenger railway station located in the city of Yonago, Tottori Prefecture, Japan. It is operated by the West Japan Railway Company (JR West).

== Lines ==
Bakurōmachi Station is served by the Sakai Line, and is located 1.0 km from the terminus of the line at Yonago. The distance between stations to the next station, Fujimichō, is officially 0.5 km, but the actual distance is about 420 meters—the shortest distance between stations on all JR lines.

== Station layout ==
The station consists of one ground-level side platform located on the right side of the single bi-directional track when facing in the direction of Sakaiminato. There is no station building and the station is unattended.

== History ==
Bakurōmachi Station opened on 1 July 1952.

== Passenger statistics ==
In fiscal 2018, the station was used by an average of 470 passengers daily.

== Surrounding area ==
- Tottori Prefectural Yonago Higashi High School
- Tottori Prefectural Yonago Technical High School
- National Route 181

== See also ==
- List of railway stations in Japan
