= Ōshinozuchō Station =

Railway station in Yonago, Tottori Prefecture, Japan

Ōshinozuchō Station 大篠津町駅
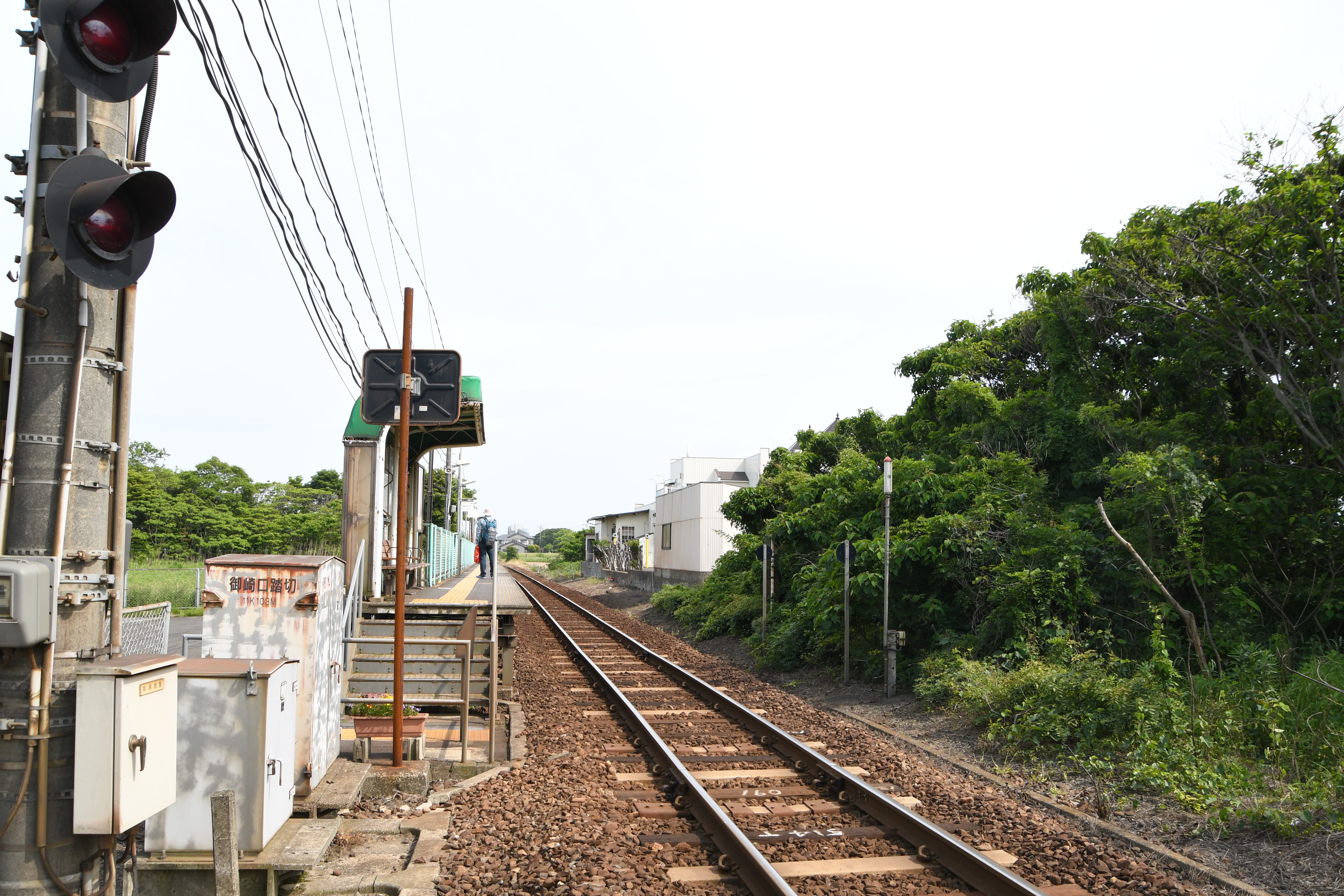
- Ōshinozuchō Station, May 2018

General information
- Location: 2211, Ōshinozu-chō, Yonago-shi, Tottori-ken 683-0101; Japan
- Coordinates: 35°29′20.7″N 133°15′21.5″E
- Operator: JR West
- Line: C Sakai Line
- Distance: 11.1 km (6.9 miles) from Yonago
- Platforms: 1 side platform
- Tracks: 1

Construction
- Structure type: At grade

Other information
- Status: Unstaffed
- Website: Official website

History
- Opened: 1 November 1987
- Former names: Misakiguchi (until 2008)

Passengers
- 2018: 118 daily
Location
- Location within Tottori Prefecture Location within Japan

Ōshinozuchō Station (大篠津町駅, Ōshinozuchō-eki) is a passenger railway station located in the city of Yonago, Tottori Prefecture, Japan. It is operated by the West Japan Railway Company (JR West).

== Lines ==
Ōshinozuchō Station is served by the Sakai Line, and is located 11.1 kilometers from the terminus of the line at Yonago.

== Station layout ==
The station consists of one ground-level side platform located on the right side of the tracks when facing in the direction of Sakaiminato. There is no station building, but there is a hut-like waiting area on the platform. The station is unattended.

== Adjacent stations ==
| « | Service | » |
Sakai Line
Rapid: Does not stop at this station
| Wadahama | Local | Yonago Airport |

== History ==
Ōshinozuchō Station opened on 1 November 1987 as Misakiguchi Station (御崎口駅). It was relocated 800 meters and renamed to its present name on June 15, 2008 due to the expansion of Yonago Airport.

== Passenger statistics ==
In fiscal 2018, the station was used by an average of 118 passengers daily.

== Surrounding area ==
- Yonago Municipal Miho Junior High School
- Yonago Municipal Oshinozu Elementary School
- Asian Museum / Yasushi Inoue Memorial Hall

== See also ==
- List of railway stations in Japan
