= 上道駅 =

上道駅 or 上道驛 may refer to:

- Agarimichi Station
- Jōtō Station (Okayama)
- Sangdo station
