= Agarimichi Station =

Railway station in Sakaminato, Tottori Prefecture, Japan

Agarimichi Station 上道駅
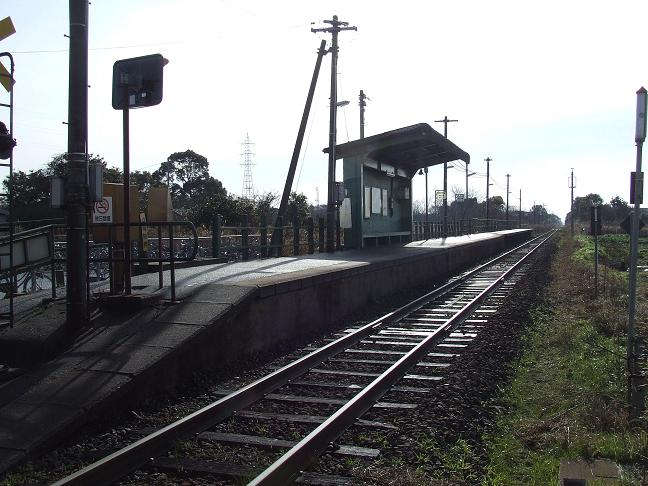
- Agarimichi Station in 2008

General information
- Location: 1503, Takenouchi-chō, Sakaiminato-shi, Tottori-ken 684-0041; Japan
- Coordinates: 35°31′53.31″N 133°13′50.0″E
- Operator: JR West
- Line: C Sakai Line
- Distance: 16.3 km (10.1 miles) from Yonago
- Platforms: 1 side platform
- Tracks: 1

Construction
- Structure type: At grade

Other information
- Status: Unstaffed
- Website: Official website

History
- Opened: 1 July 1952

Passengers
- 2018: 658 daily

Services
Preceding station	JR West	Following station
Babasakichō towards Sakaiminato	Sakai Line Local	Amariko towards Yonago
Location
- Location within Tottori Prefecture Location within Japan

Agarimichi Station (上道駅, Agarimichi-eki) is a passenger railway station located in the city of Sakaiminato, Tottori Prefecture, Japan. It is operated by the West Japan Railway Company (JR West).

== Lines ==
Agarimichi Station is served by the Sakai Line, and is located 16.3 kilometers from the terminus of the line at Yonago. Only local trains stop at this station.

== Station layout ==
The station consists of one ground-level side platform locate don then right side of a single bi-directional platform when looking in the direction of Sakaiminato. There is no station building and the station is unattended.

== History ==
Agarimichi Station opened on 1 July 1952.

== Passenger statistics ==
In fiscal 2018, the station was used by an average of 356 passengers daily.

== Surrounding area ==
- Sakaiminato Civic Gymnasium
- Tottori Prefectural Sakai High School

== See also ==
- List of railway stations in Japan
