= Sakaiminato =

Sakaiminato 境港市
- City
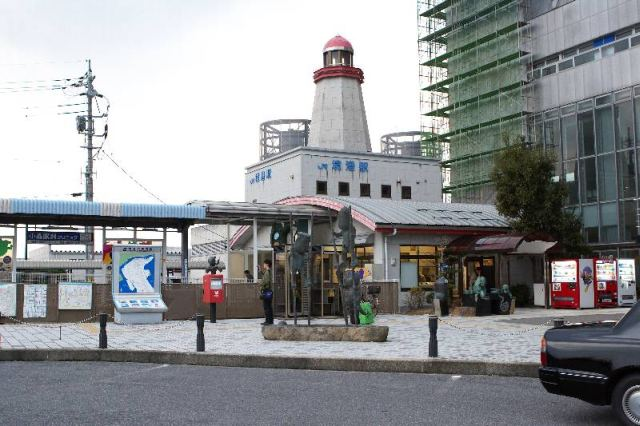
- Downtown Sakaiminato, near Sakaiminato Station

- Flag Seal

- Location of Sakaiminato in Tottori Prefecture

- Location in Japan
- Coordinates: 35°32′N 133°14′E
- Country: Japan
- Region: Chūgoku (San'in)
- Prefecture: Tottori

Government
  - Mayor: Kentarō Date

Area
  - Total: 29.10 km^{2} (11.24 sq mi)

Population (1 June 2016)
  - Total: 32,012
  - Density: 1,100/km^{2} (2,849/sq mi)
- Time zone: UTC+09:00 (JST)
- City hall address: 3000, Agarimichichō, Sakaiminato-shi, Tottori-ken 684-8501
- Climate: Cfa
- Website: Official website
- Symbols
- Flower: Chrysanthemum
- Tree: Japanese Black Pine

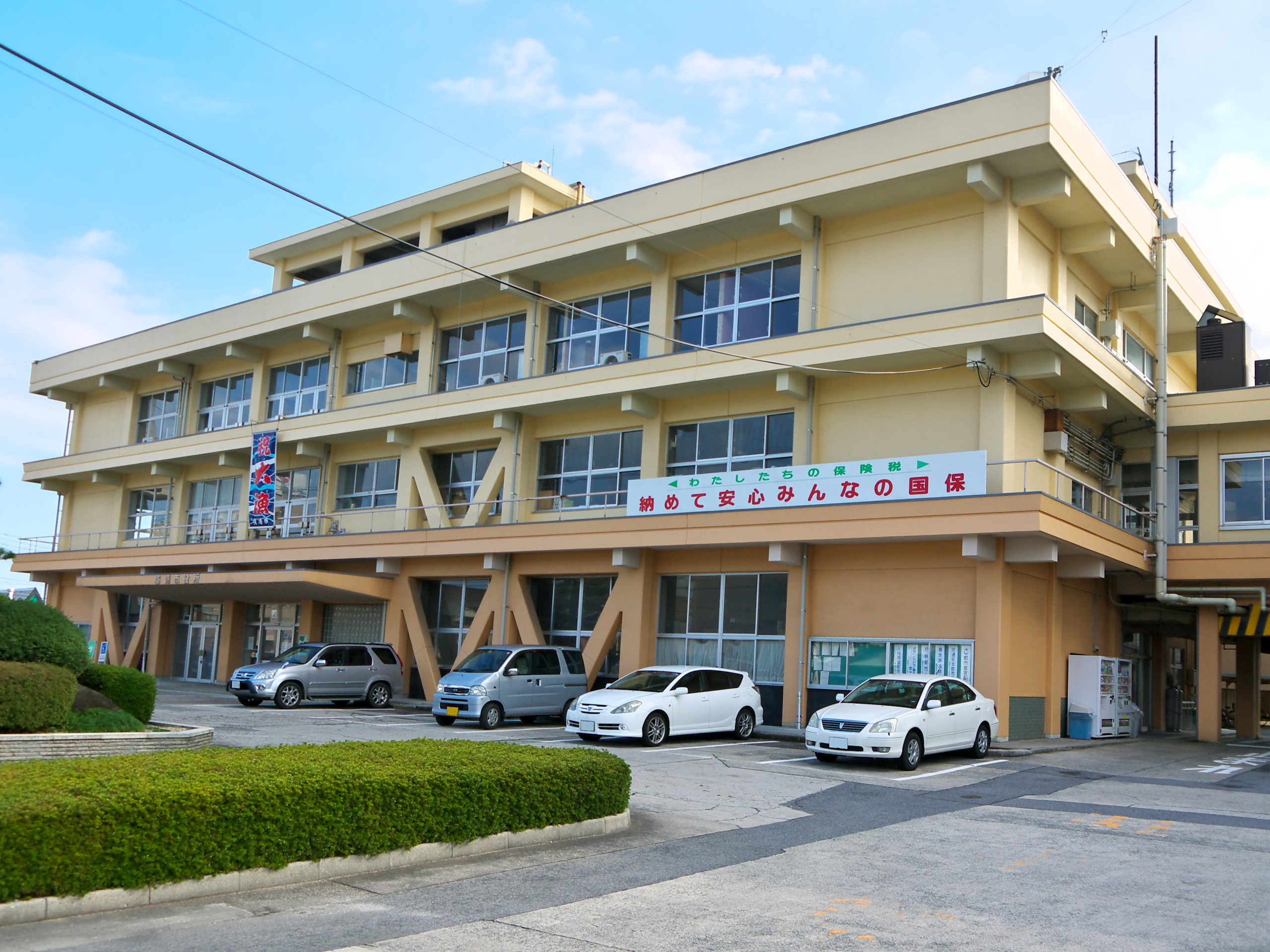
Sakaiminato City Hall

Sakaiminato (境港市, Sakaiminato-shi) is a city in Tottori Prefecture, Japan. As of 31 December 2021, the city had an estimated population of 32,012 in 13178 households and a population density of 1110 persons per km^{2}. The total area of the city is 272.06 square kilometres (105.04 sq mi).

== Geography ==
Sakaiminato is located in far western Tottori Prefecture, at the northern end of the Yumigahama Peninsula. It is surrounded on three sides by Lake Nakaumi, the Sea of Japan, and the Sakai Channel, which connects them. Across the Sakai Channel or across the Eshima Ohashi Bridge, it borders the city of Matsue in Shimane Prefecture. Sakaiminato is located on a sandbar, and the land is very flat, with an average elevation of two meters above sea level.

== Surrounding municipalities ==
Tottori Prefecture

- Yonago

Shimane Prefecture

- Matsue
- Yasugi

== Climate ==
Sakaiminato has a humid subtropical climate (Köppen Cfa) characterized by warm, wet summers and cold winters with heavy snowfall. The average annual temperature in Sakaiminato is 15.5 °C (59.9 °F). The average annual rainfall is 1,903.3 mm (74.93 in) with July as the wettest month. The temperatures are highest on average in August, at around 27.3 °C (81.1 °F), and lowest in January, at around 4.9 °C (40.8 °F). Its record high is 38.5 °C (101.3 °F), reached on 22 August 2018 and 1 August 2022, and its record low is −9.7 °C (14.5 °F), reached on 27 January 1904.

Climate data for Sakaiminato (1991−2020 normals, extremes 1883−present)
Month	Jan	Feb	Mar	Apr	May	Jun	Jul	Aug	Sep	Oct	Nov	Dec	Year
Record high °C (°F)	19.7 (67.5)	24.6 (76.3)	27.5 (81.5)	31.2 (88.2)	32.9 (91.2)	36.5 (97.7)	37.8 (100.0)	38.5 (101.3)	36.9 (98.4)	33.6 (92.5)	27.7 (81.9)	23.4 (74.1)	38.5 (101.3)
Mean maximum °C (°F)	14.2 (57.6)	17.0 (62.6)	21.8 (71.2)	26.5 (79.7)	30.0 (86.0)	31.9 (89.4)	35.1 (95.2)	36.0 (96.8)	33.1 (91.6)	28.7 (83.7)	23.0 (73.4)	17.1 (62.8)	36.3 (97.3)
Mean daily maximum °C (°F)	8.3 (46.9)	9.2 (48.6)	12.8 (55.0)	18.4 (65.1)	23.1 (73.6)	26.0 (78.8)	29.9 (85.8)	31.5 (88.7)	27.0 (80.6)	22.1 (71.8)	16.7 (62.1)	11.0 (51.8)	19.7 (67.4)
Daily mean °C (°F)	4.9 (40.8)	5.3 (41.5)	8.3 (46.9)	13.3 (55.9)	18.1 (64.6)	21.8 (71.2)	25.9 (78.6)	27.3 (81.1)	23.2 (73.8)	17.8 (64.0)	12.4 (54.3)	7.3 (45.1)	15.5 (59.8)
Mean daily minimum °C (°F)	1.7 (35.1)	1.6 (34.9)	3.9 (39.0)	8.4 (47.1)	13.6 (56.5)	18.4 (65.1)	22.9 (73.2)	24.1 (75.4)	20.0 (68.0)	13.8 (56.8)	8.4 (47.1)	3.9 (39.0)	11.7 (53.1)
Mean minimum °C (°F)	−2.5 (27.5)	−2.5 (27.5)	−1.1 (30.0)	2.1 (35.8)	8.0 (46.4)	13.7 (56.7)	19.2 (66.6)	20.5 (68.9)	14.5 (58.1)	8.0 (46.4)	3.2 (37.8)	−0.3 (31.5)	−3.3 (26.1)
Record low °C (°F)	−9.7 (14.5)	−8.2 (17.2)	−5.6 (21.9)	−2.1 (28.2)	1.8 (35.2)	7.0 (44.6)	12.0 (53.6)	14.5 (58.1)	8.3 (46.9)	2.3 (36.1)	−1.4 (29.5)	−7.9 (17.8)	−9.7 (14.5)
Average precipitation mm (inches)	188.4 (7.42)	136.0 (5.35)	139.7 (5.50)	111.2 (4.38)	123.3 (4.85)	170.8 (6.72)	215.2 (8.47)	140.9 (5.55)	212.8 (8.38)	133.5 (5.26)	145.9 (5.74)	193.2 (7.61)	1,903.3 (74.93)
Average snowfall cm (inches)	32 (13)	25 (9.8)	6 (2.4)	0 (0)	0 (0)	0 (0)	0 (0)	0 (0)	0 (0)	0 (0)	0 (0)	14 (5.5)	75 (30)
Average precipitation days (≥ 1.0 mm)	19.6	15.0	13.2	10.4	9.1	9.9	11.0	9.4	10.8	10.1	13.0	18.5	150
Average snowy days (≥ 1 cm)	7.1	5.8	1.1	0	0	0	0	0	0	0	0	3.4	17.4
Average relative humidity (%)	74	72	69	68	70	77	79	76	77	74	73	74	74
Mean monthly sunshine hours	63.0	81.8	137.9	183.9	208.9	162.0	174.3	207.1	147.5	154.8	109.2	74.7	1,705.1
Source: Japan Meteorological Agency

== Demography ==
Per Japanese census data, the population of Sakaiminato has been as follows.

Historical population
Year	Pop.	±%
1920	21,199	—
1930	24,267	+14.5%
1940	22,386	−7.8%
1950	29,746	+32.9%
1960	32,714	+10.0%
1970	34,145	+4.4%
1980	38,278	+12.1%
1990	37,282	−2.6%
2000	36,843	−1.2%
2010	35,219	−4.4%

== Etymology ==
The name of Sakaiminato in the Japanese language is formed from two kanji characters. The first, 境, means "border", and the second, 港 means "port".

== History ==
The area of Sakaiminato was part of ancient Hōki Province and number remains from the Yayoi period and Kofun period have been found within city limits. In the Muromachi period, the area was dominated by the powerful Amago clan from Izumo Province and occupied an important position as a landing point for rice and navy anchorage. During the Sengoku period, it came under the control of the Mōri clan, and during the Edo Period, it was part of the holdings of the Ikeda clan of Tottori Domain. Following the Meiji restoration, the port prospered as a strategic point for domestic shipping routes in the Sea of Japan, and was designated as a trading port in 1896 for continental trade with Busan, Incheon, and Wonsan on the Korean Peninsula. The town of Sakai was established on October 21, 1889, with the establishment of the modern municipalities system. It was raised to city status on April 1, 1956, changing its name to Sakaiminato at that time.

== Government ==
Sakaiminato has a mayor-council form of government with a directly elected mayor and a unicameral city council of 15 members. The current mayor of Sakaiminato is Kentarō Date, serving since July 25, 2020. The city council meets four times a year (March, June, September, and December) and special meetings take place if required. The mayor convenes the city council meetings, but the mayor must call a special meeting when requested by one-fourth or more of the fixed number of council members . The city council members are citizens who are at least 25 years of age, and are elected every four years. Sakaiminato contributes two members to the Tottori Prefectural Assembly.. In terms of national politics, the city is part of Tottori 2nd district of the lower house of the Diet of Japan.

=== Mayors ===
1. Minoru Adachi (September 5, 1954 -)
2. Seiichirō Kashiwagi (September 5, 1966 -)
3. Sadae Yasuda (September 5, 1978 - November 20, 1989)
4. Tetsuo Kuromi (December 10, 1989 - June 5, 2004)
5. Katsuji Nakamura (July 25, 2004 - July 24, 2020)
6. Kentarō Date (July 25, 2020 -)

== Economy ==
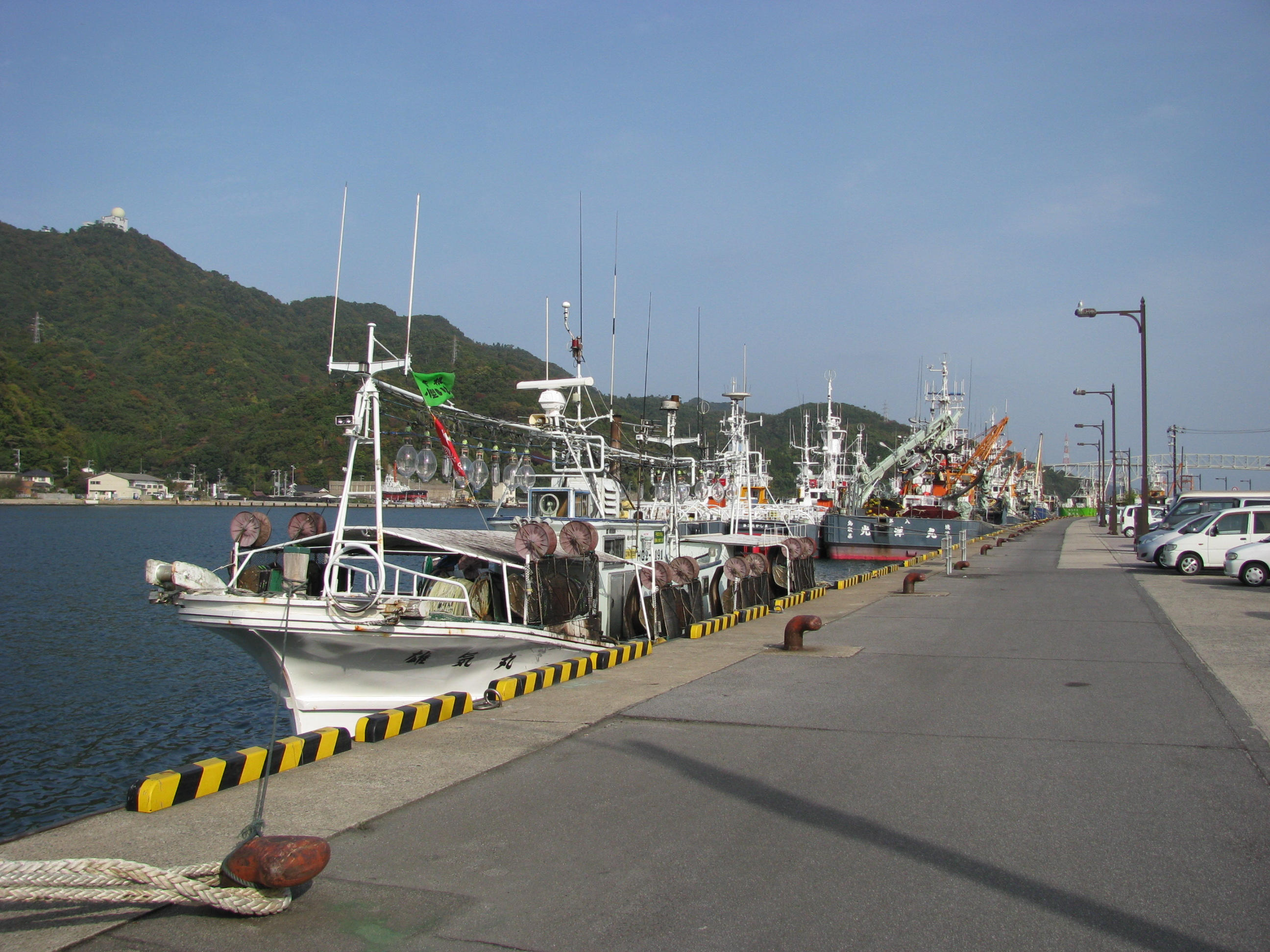
The Sakai Port

The seaport of Sakaiminato has a long history as a seaport for the San'in Region. Following World War II the city has served as the base of the fishing industry for all of Western Japan. Consequently, marine product processing is also a major industry in the city.

== Education ==
Sakaiminato has six public elementary schools and three public junior high schools operated by the town government. The city has two public high schools operated by the Tottori Prefectural Board of Education.

== Transportation ==
=== Airport ===
- Miho-Yonago Airport

=== Railway ===
JR West - Sakai Line.

- Yonago Airport - Nakahama - Takamatsuchō - Amariko - Agarimichi - Babasakichō - Sakaiminato

=== Highways ===
- National Route 431

=== Ferries ===
Ferries operate from Sakaiminato to the Oki Islands.

=== Seaports ===
- Port of Sakaiminato; The port at Sakaiminato serves the DBS Cruise ferry Eastern Dream, which connects Japan to Donghae, South Korea, and Vladivostok, Russia.

== Sister cities ==
Sakaiminato is twinned with:

- Hunchun, China

=== Former twin towns ===
- Wonsan, North Korea (revoked in 2006). Sakaiminato was the only Japanese municipality to have a twin town agreement with a North Korean city from 1992 to 2006. In 2006, Mayor Katsuji Nakamura revoke the agreement in response to North Korea's announcement of a nuclear test along with the Japanese government's decision to impose economic sanctions. Actual twin town activities had already come to an end by 2002, after which the cities had only sent each other a letter once per year.

== Local attractions ==
- Tottori Domain Battery Sites, National Historic Site

== Notable people from Sakaiminato ==
- Shigeru Mizuki, the creator of GeGeGe no Kitaro, a character seen in many forms throughout Japan. Although he was born in Osaka, Mizuki was raised in Sakaiminato. The spirit of Kitaro can be found in Sakaiminato, on Kitaro Road, a street dedicated to all the characters that appear in Mizuki's stories. Over one hundred bronze statues of the story's characters line both sides of the road.
- Shōji Ueda

== Gallery ==
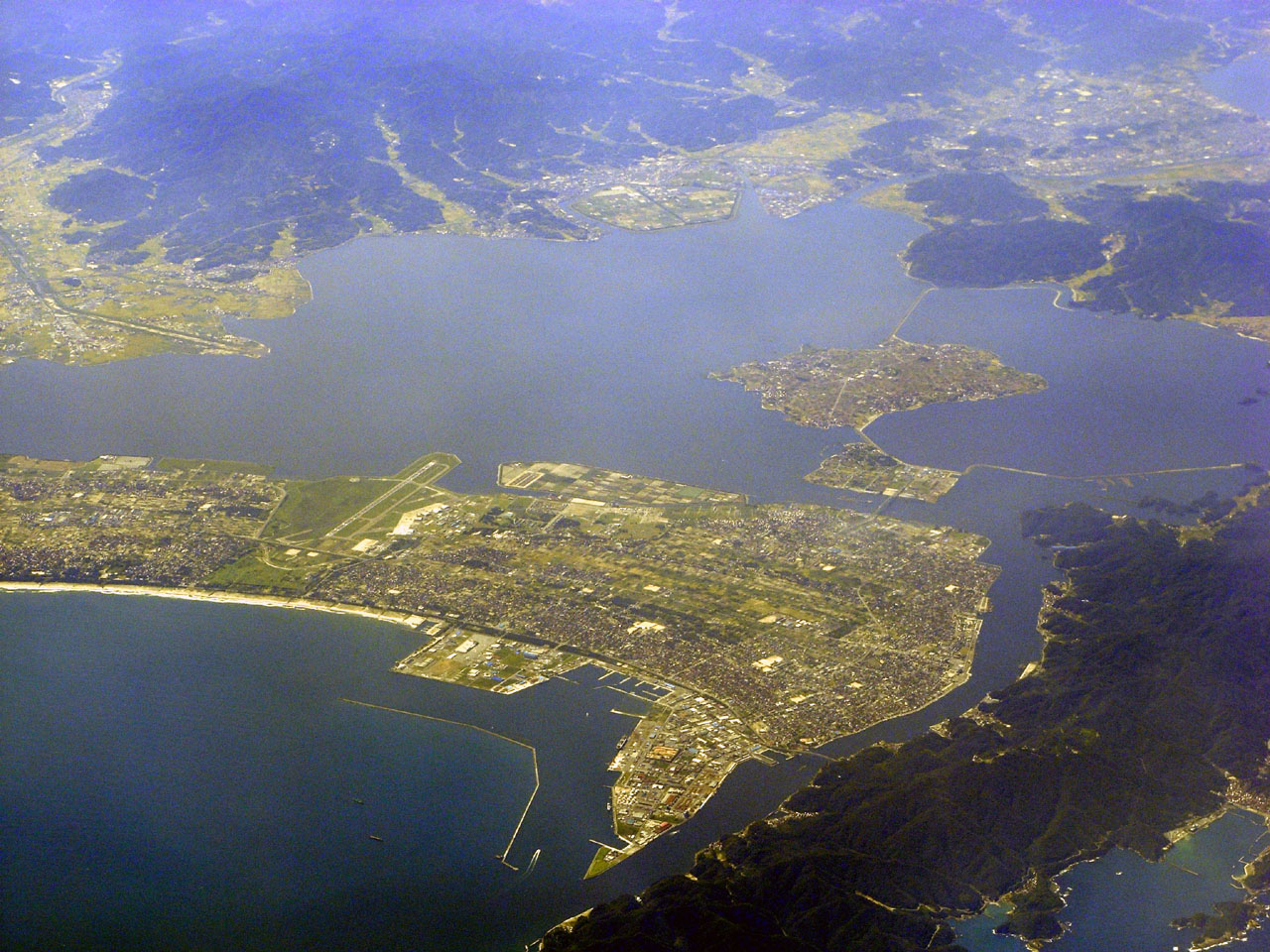
Aerial view of part of Sakaiminato.

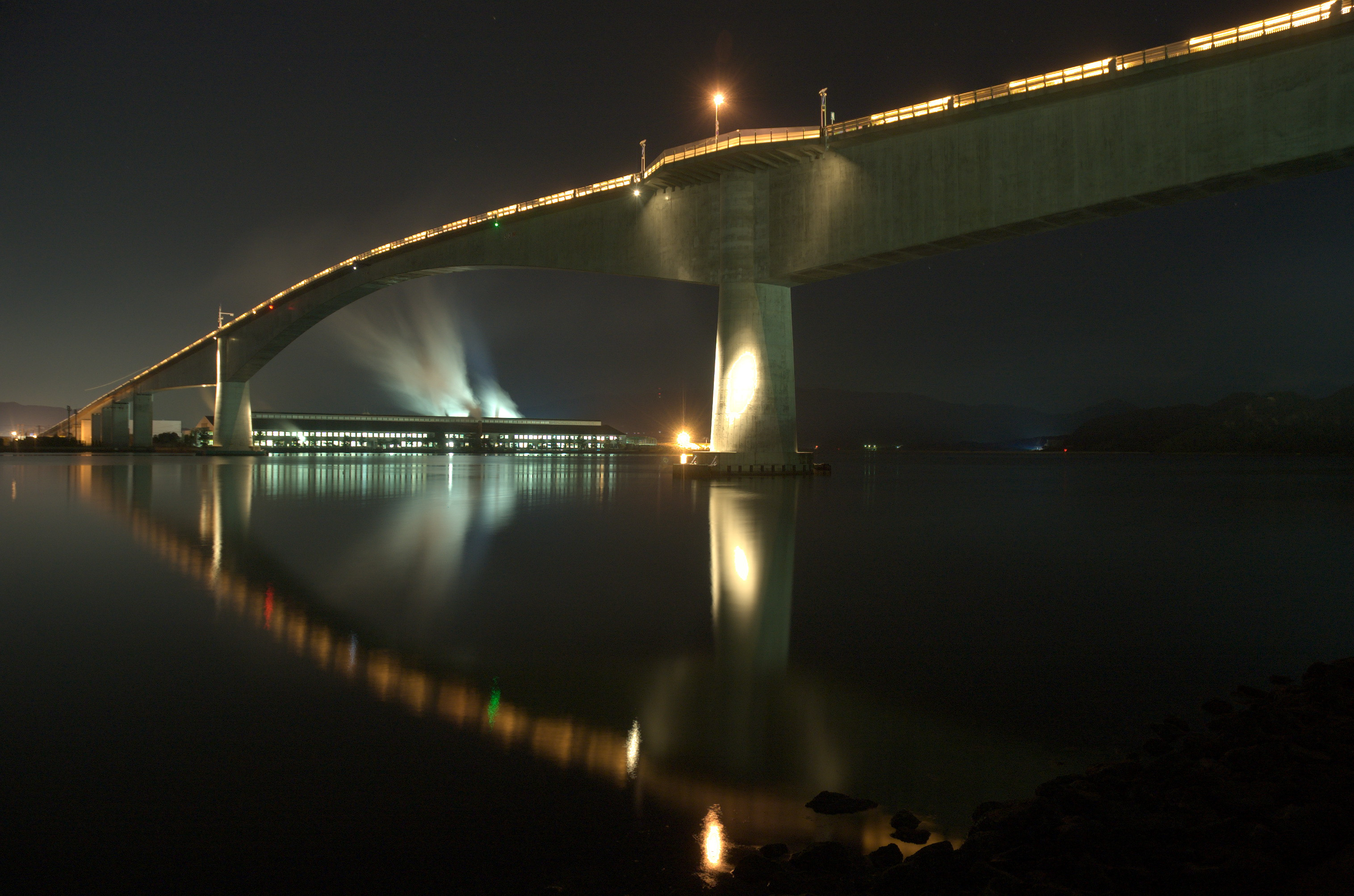
Eshima Ohashi Bridge links Sakaiminato and Matsue across a narrow channel.
