= Yonago =

Yonago 米子市
- City
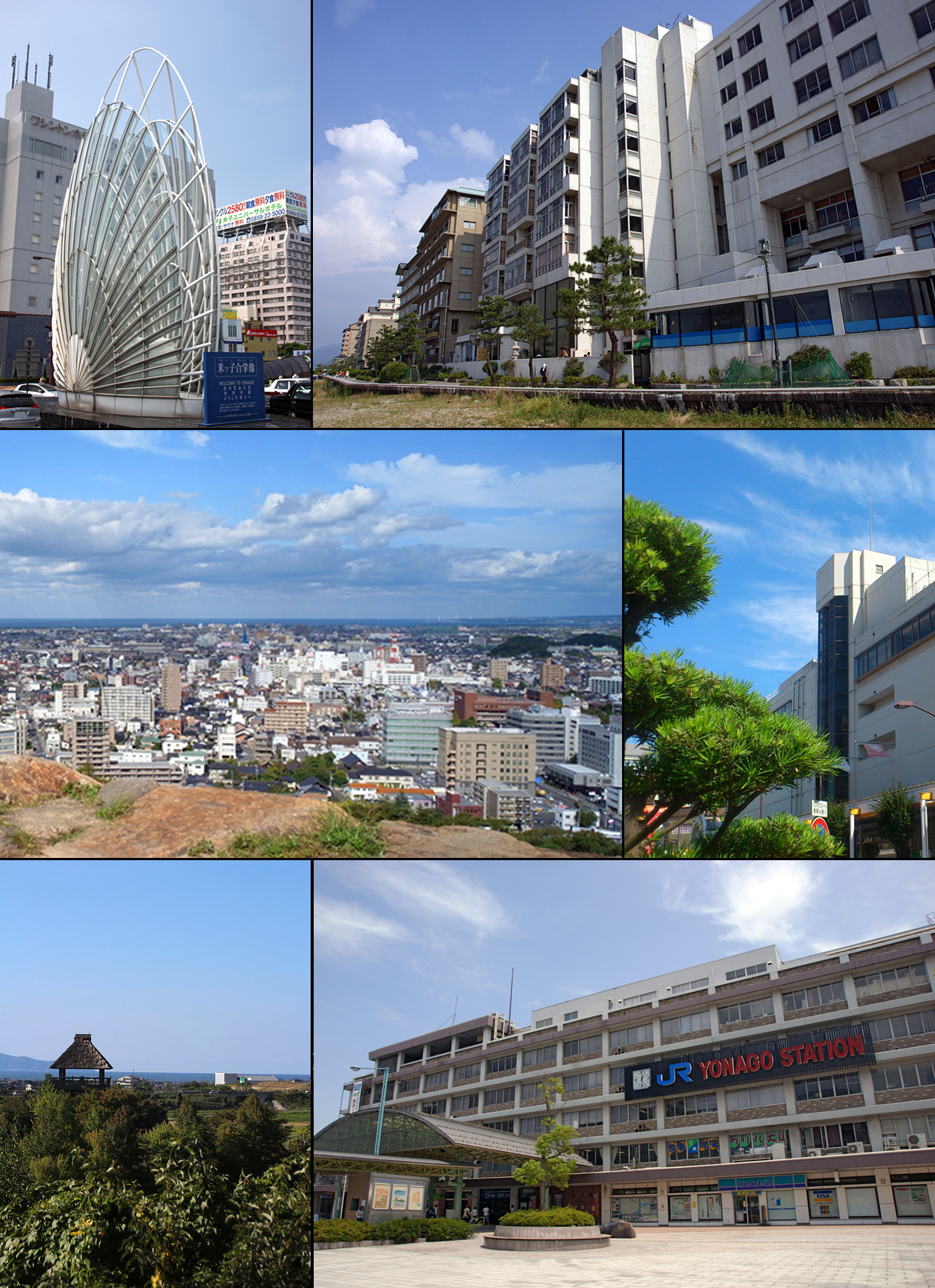
- Top left: Statue of Station Square, Top right: Kaike Spa and Kaike Coast, 2nd left: Yonago Castle Site, 2nd right: Yonago Takashimaya, 3rd left: Mugibandai ruins in Yodoe, 3rd right: Yonago Station

- Flag Seal
- Location of Yonago in Tottori Prefecture

- Location in Japan
- Coordinates: 35°26′N 133°20′E
- Country: Japan
- Region: Chūgoku (San'in)
- Prefecture: Tottori

Government
  - Mayor: Takashi Igi (from April 2017)

Area
  - Total: 132.42 km^{2} (51.13 sq mi)

Population (December 31, 2022)
  - Total: 146,139
  - Density: 1,103.6/km^{2} (2,858.3/sq mi)
- Time zone: UTC+09:00 (JST)
- City hall address: 1-1 Kamo-chō, Yonago-shi, Tottori-ken 683-8686
- Climate: Cfa
- Website: Official website
- Symbols
- Bird: Tundra swan
- Flower: Azalea

Yonago (米子市, Yonago-shi) is a city in western Tottori Prefecture, Japan. As of 31 December 2021, the city had an estimated population of 146,139 in 68,534 households and a population density of 1100 persons per km^{2}. The total area of the city is 132.42 square kilometres (51.13 sq mi). It is the prefecture's second largest city after Tottori, and forms a commercial center of the western part of the prefecture.

== Geography ==
Yonago is in far western Tottori Prefecture, and faces the Sea of Japan to the north and Lake Nakaumi to the northwest. It is adjacent to Shimane Prefecture and across the lake from its capital of Matsue. The city limits are mostly flat, and the Hino River flows through the Yonago Plain. The southern part is a hilly area at the foot of Mount Daisen, and the mountainous area can be seen from the Yumigahama Peninsula in the northwest. The irrigation canal "Yonekawa" runs from Yonago City to Sakaiminato City as an intake of water from the Hino River.

== Surrounding municipalities ==
Tottori Prefecture

- Sakaiminato
- Daisen
- Nanbu
- Hōki
- Hiezu

Shimane Prefecture

- Yasugi

== Climate ==
Yonago has a humid subtropical climate (Köppen climate classification Cfa) with hot summers and cool winters. Precipitation is significant throughout the year, with July and September being particularly wet months.

Climate data for Yonago (1991−2020 normals, extremes 1939−present)
Month	Jan	Feb	Mar	Apr	May	Jun	Jul	Aug	Sep	Oct	Nov	Dec	Year
Record high °C (°F)	20.0 (68.0)	25.4 (77.7)	28.0 (82.4)	33.7 (92.7)	33.8 (92.8)	36.7 (98.1)	38.3 (100.9)	38.9 (102.0)	37.1 (98.8)	33.5 (92.3)	27.3 (81.1)	23.7 (74.7)	38.9 (102.0)
Mean maximum °C (°F)	14.6 (58.3)	17.5 (63.5)	22.0 (71.6)	27.4 (81.3)	30.4 (86.7)	32.7 (90.9)	35.8 (96.4)	36.5 (97.7)	33.4 (92.1)	29.1 (84.4)	23.4 (74.1)	17.7 (63.9)	36.8 (98.2)
Mean daily maximum °C (°F)	8.3 (46.9)	9.2 (48.6)	12.9 (55.2)	18.4 (65.1)	23.3 (73.9)	26.0 (78.8)	30.3 (86.5)	31.7 (89.1)	27.1 (80.8)	22.1 (71.8)	16.8 (62.2)	11.1 (52.0)	19.8 (67.6)
Daily mean °C (°F)	4.7 (40.5)	5.1 (41.2)	8.2 (46.8)	13.2 (55.8)	18.2 (64.8)	21.8 (71.2)	26.2 (79.2)	27.3 (81.1)	23.0 (73.4)	17.5 (63.5)	12.2 (54.0)	7.1 (44.8)	15.4 (59.7)
Mean daily minimum °C (°F)	1.3 (34.3)	1.3 (34.3)	3.5 (38.3)	8.0 (46.4)	13.3 (55.9)	18.2 (64.8)	22.8 (73.0)	23.7 (74.7)	19.3 (66.7)	13.1 (55.6)	7.9 (46.2)	3.5 (38.3)	11.3 (52.4)
Mean minimum °C (°F)	−2.7 (27.1)	−2.5 (27.5)	−1.3 (29.7)	1.3 (34.3)	7.1 (44.8)	12.8 (55.0)	18.7 (65.7)	19.3 (66.7)	13.5 (56.3)	7.1 (44.8)	2.6 (36.7)	−0.8 (30.6)	−3.4 (25.9)
Record low °C (°F)	−7.2 (19.0)	−9.4 (15.1)	−5.6 (21.9)	−3.1 (26.4)	1.5 (34.7)	5.9 (42.6)	12.2 (54.0)	13.7 (56.7)	7.2 (45.0)	1.1 (34.0)	−1.4 (29.5)	−6.7 (19.9)	−9.4 (15.1)
Average precipitation mm (inches)	151.7 (5.97)	117.5 (4.63)	128.2 (5.05)	106.3 (4.19)	119.1 (4.69)	169.5 (6.67)	227.2 (8.94)	128.4 (5.06)	214.3 (8.44)	131.1 (5.16)	118.1 (4.65)	145.9 (5.74)	1,757.2 (69.18)
Average snowfall cm (inches)	39 (15)	32 (13)	6 (2.4)	0 (0)	0 (0)	0 (0)	0 (0)	0 (0)	0 (0)	0 (0)	0 (0)	19 (7.5)	95 (37)
Average precipitation days (≥ 1.0 mm)	17.5	14.5	13.4	10.2	9.1	10.5	11.9	9.6	11.3	10.0	12.4	16.5	146.9
Average snowy days (≥ 1 cm)	7.5	6.4	1.2	0	0	0	0	0	0	0	0	3.0	18.1
Average relative humidity (%)	74	72	69	67	68	76	77	75	77	74	72	74	73
Mean monthly sunshine hours	72.3	87.7	141.5	182.0	208.6	160.8	171.5	207.1	148.7	156.8	116.5	82.5	1,732.4
Source: Japan Meteorological Agency

== Demography ==
Per Japanese census data, the population of Yonago has been slowly growing since the 1950s as follows.

Historical population
Year	Pop.	±%
1950	100,836	—
1960	108,583	+7.7%
1970	117,056	+7.8%
1980	136,053	+16.2%
1990	140,503	+3.3%
2000	147,837	+5.2%
2010	148,090	+0.2%

== Etymology ==
The name of Yonago in the Japanese language is formed from two kanji characters. The first, 米, means "rice", and the second, 子 means "child".

== History ==
The area of Yonago was part of ancient Hōki Province. Per the Kojiki, the tomb of the creator kami Izanami is located on the border of Yonago with neighboring Izumo Province, and many Yayoi period and Kofun period remains have been found within city limits.

In the early Edo Period, the Tokugawa Shogunate appointed Nakamura Kazutada to be daimyō of the 175,000 koku Yonago Domain, and reconstructed Yonago Castle. The center of the modern city of Yonago evolved from the jōkamachi of that castle. After Nakamura died without heir, the domain was abolished and its territories incorporated into the holdings of the Ikeda clan of Tottori Domain. The Ikeda retained Yonago Castle and assigned it to their hereditary karō from the Arao clan who ruled until the Meiji restoration.

The town of Yonago was established within Aioi District of Tottori Prefecture with the creation of the modern municipalities system in October 1889. A post office was founded in 1872, a prison in 1877, and a courthouse in 1884. Railway services were established in 1902. After becoming Saihaku County through county mergers, Yonago was raised to city status on April 1, 1927. Yonago absorbed the town of Yodoe (from Saihaku District) on March 31, 2005.

== Government ==
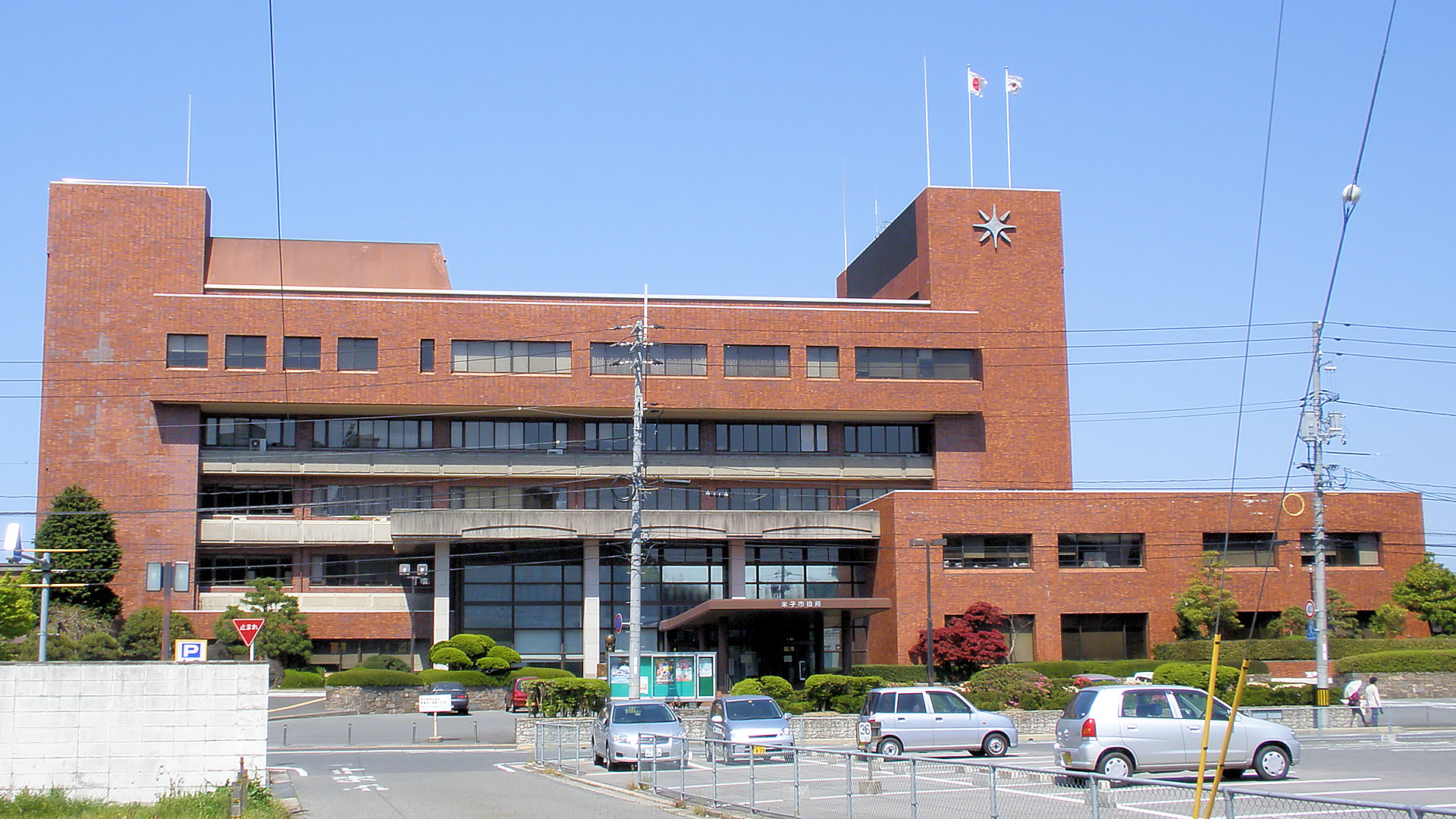
Yonago City Hall

Yonago has a mayor-council form of government with a directly elected mayor and a unicameral city council of 26 members. Yonago contributes nine members to the Tottori Prefectural Assembly. In terms of national politics, the city is part of Tottori 2nd district of the lower house of the Diet of Japan.

=== Mayor of town era (1889 to 1927) ===
- Haruhiko Endo (遠藤春彦) December 1889 to April 1892
- Yajiro Miyoshi (三好八次郎) May 1892 to December 1892
- Seitaro Otsuka (大塚誠太郎) December 1892 to December 1896
- Zenhei Sumida (住田善平) December 1896 to December 1900
- Genjiro Kinemura (杵村源次郎) December 1900 to September 1901
- Hayami Watanabe (渡辺駛水) October 1901 to October 1909
- Kenji Hatotani (鳩谷兼次) December 1909 to December 1913
- Tanji Niwa (丹羽旦次) December 1913 to December 1921
- Tsunehiko Nishio (西尾常彦) April 1922 to March 1927

=== Mayor of city era (1927 to present) ===
- Tsunehiko Nishio April 1927 to July 1943
- Kanjo Saito (斎藤干城) August 1943 to December 1945
- Kanji Nosaka (野坂寛治) December 1945 to April 1963
- Hiromichi Kawai (河合弘道) April 1963 to April 1983
- Toru Matsumoto (松本 徹) April 1983 to April 1991
- Takatomo Morita (森田隆朝) April 1991 to April 2003
- Yasuo Nosaka (野坂康夫) April 2003 to April 2017
- Takashi Igi (伊木隆司) April 2017 to present

== Economy ==
Over 70% of the Yonago workforce is employed in the service sector.

Oji Paper has a production facility in Yonago. The city is also home to Sharp Yonago, which produces Sharp-brand flat screen televisions.

== Education ==
Yonago has 23 public elementary schools and 11 public junior high schools operated by the town government and one private junior high school. The city has six public high schools operated by the Tottori Prefectural Board of Education and national public high school and five private high schools. Tottori University has a campus located in Yonago. The prefecture also operates three special education schools for the handicapped.

== Transportation ==
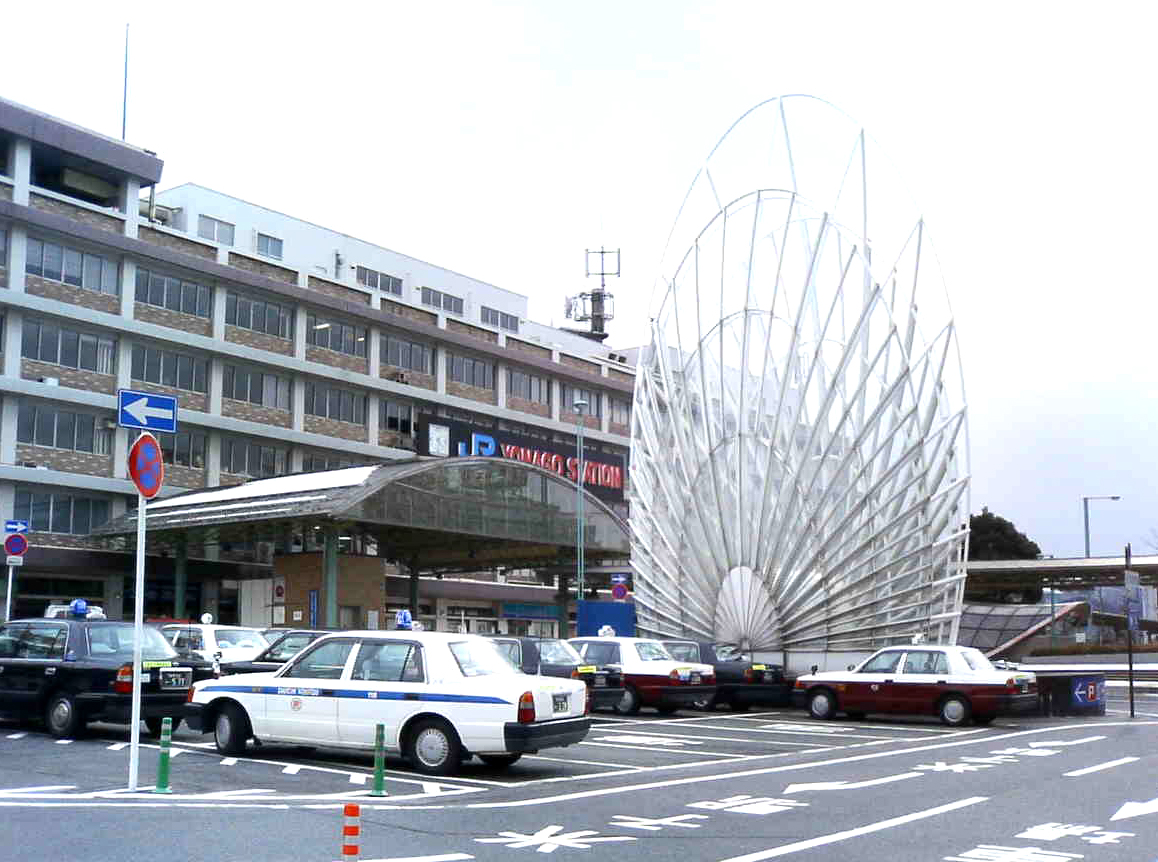
Yonago Railroad Station

=== Airports ===
- Miho-Yonago Airport, located in a neighboring city of Sakaiminato. There are currently flights to and from Tokyo Haneda Airport and also flights to Hong Kong.
- Izumo Airport, another airport located in Shimane Prefecture but not far from the city. There are currently flights to Tokyo, Osaka, Nagoya, Fukuoka, Shizuoka and Oki.

=== Railway ===
JR West - San'in Line

- Yonago - Higashiyamakōen - Hōki-Daisen - Yodoe

JR West - Hakubi Line

- Hōki-Daisen

JR West - Sakai Line

- Yonago - Bakurōmachi - Fujimichō - Gotō - Sambommatsuguchi - Kawasakiguchi - Yumigahama - Wadahama - Ōshinozuchō

=== Highways ===
- Yonago Expressway
- San'in Expressway
- National Route 9
- National Route 180
- National Route 181
- National Route 183
- National Route 431
- National Route 482

== Sister cities ==
Yonago is twinned with:

- Baoding, China, since 1991
- Sokcho, South Korea, since 1995

== Local attractions ==
=== National Historic Sites ===
- Yonago Castle - A castle ruin, one of the Continued Top 100 Japanese Castles.
- Mukoeyama Kofun Cluster
- Mukibanda Yayoi remains
- Kamiyodo temple ruins
- Aoki Site
- Fukuichi Site
- Tottori Domain Battery Sites

=== Other ===
- Odaka Castle - A castle ruin in the Sengoku period
- Ōgamiyama Shrine
- Yonago City Museum of Art
- Kaike Onsen, which sits along the Miho Bay and is part of Yonago, is said to be the birthplace of the triathlon in Japan.

== Notable people ==
- Sena Irie, Japanese boxer
- Maika Yamamoto, Japanese model and actress
- Nobuko Otowa, Japanese actress
- Kihachi Okamoto, Japanese film director
- Takeru Segawa, Japanese kickboxer

== Gallery ==
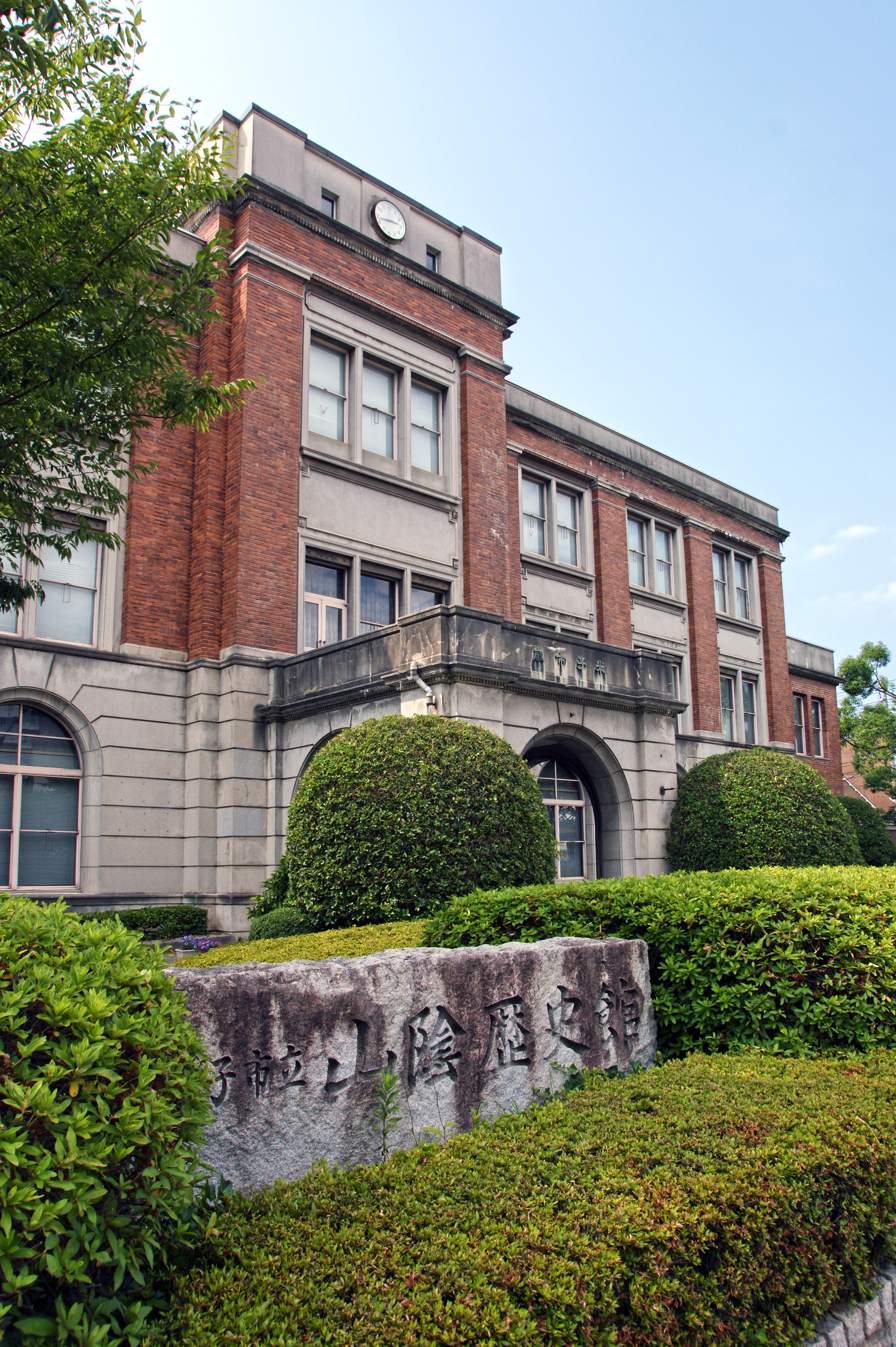
San'in Historical Museum

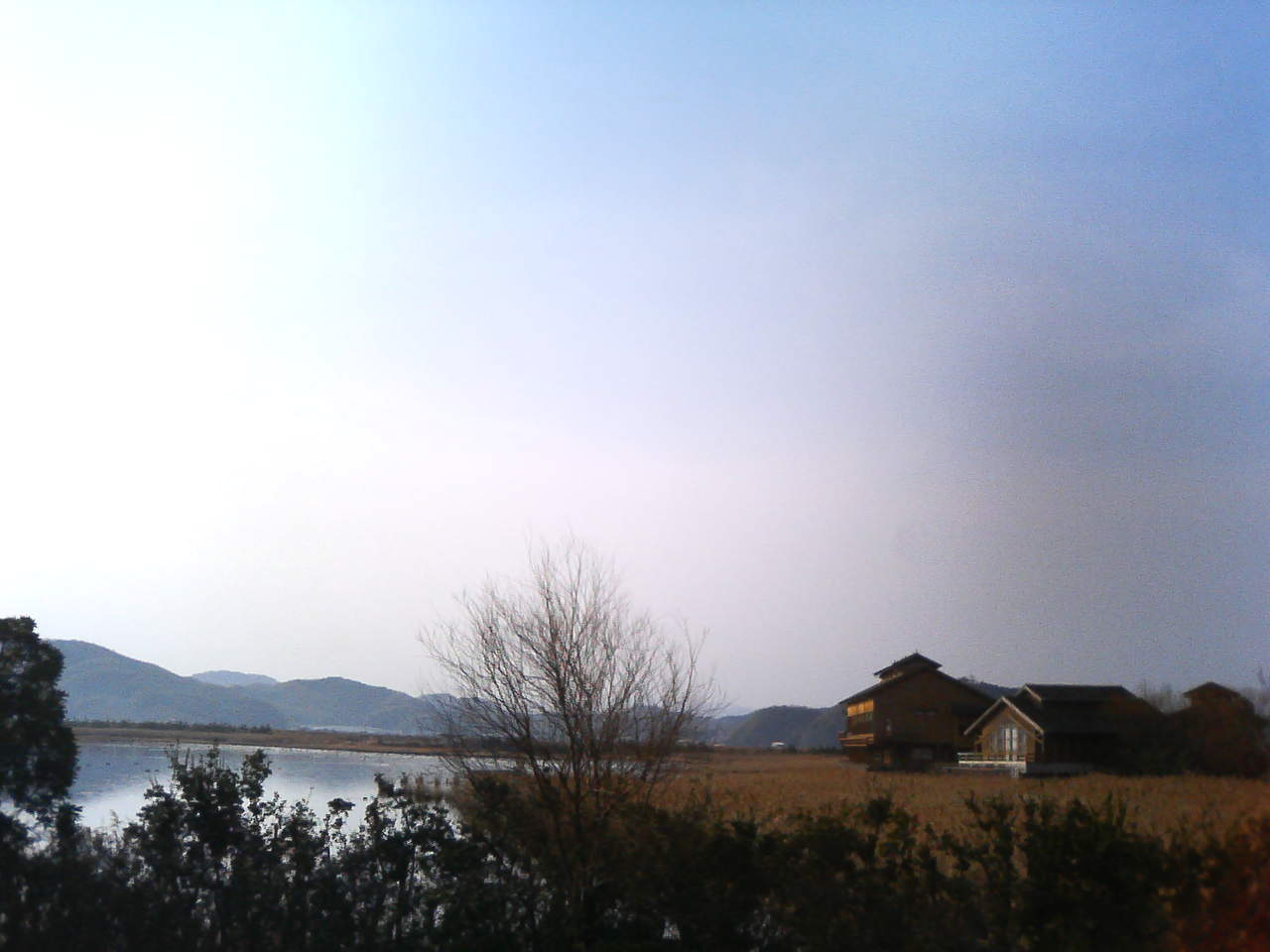
Yonago Waterbirds Sanctuary

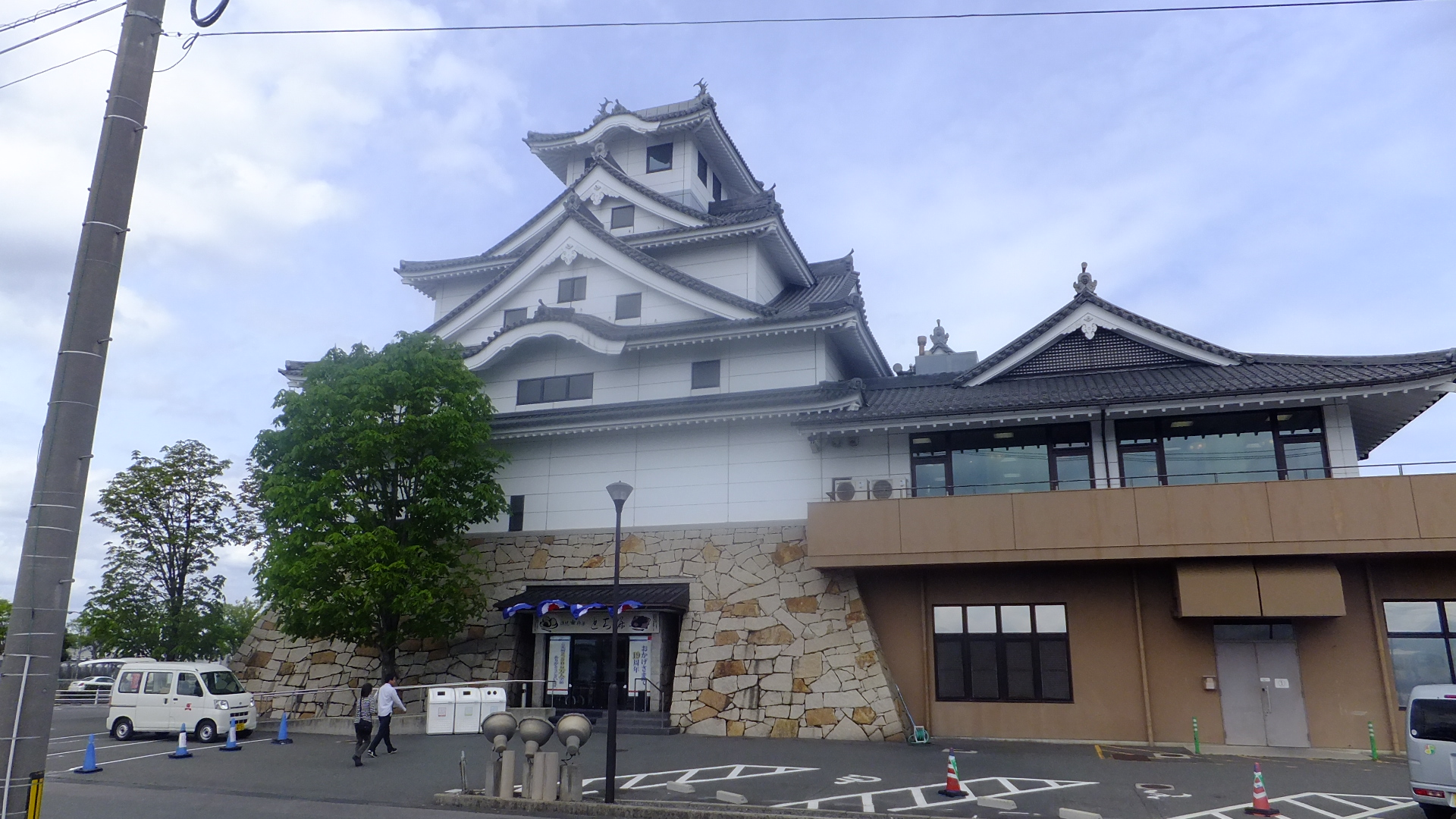
Kotobuki Castle of Sweets, in the Yodoe area, is modeled after Yonago Castle

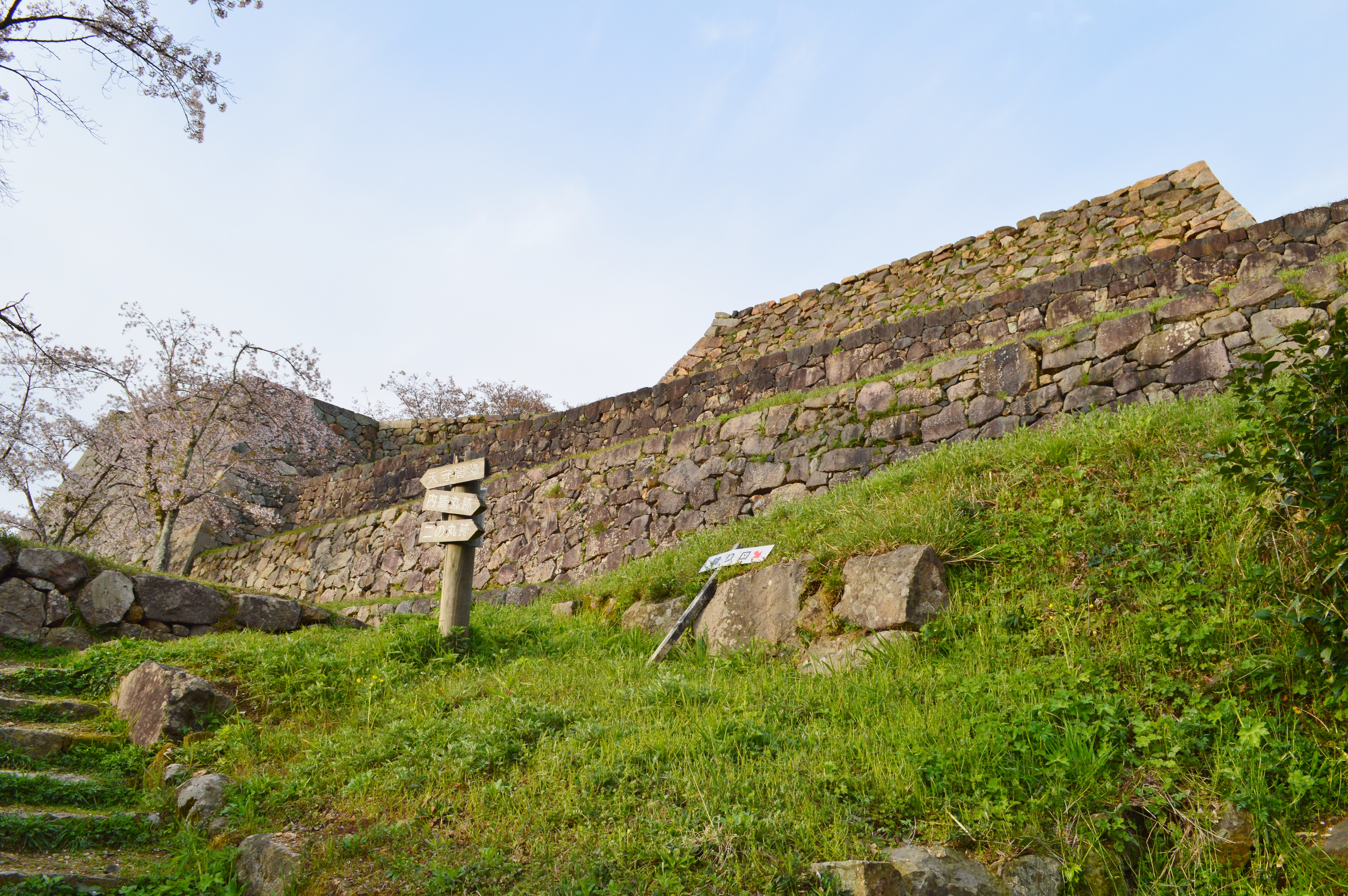
Stone wall of Yonago Castle
