= Sakai Line =

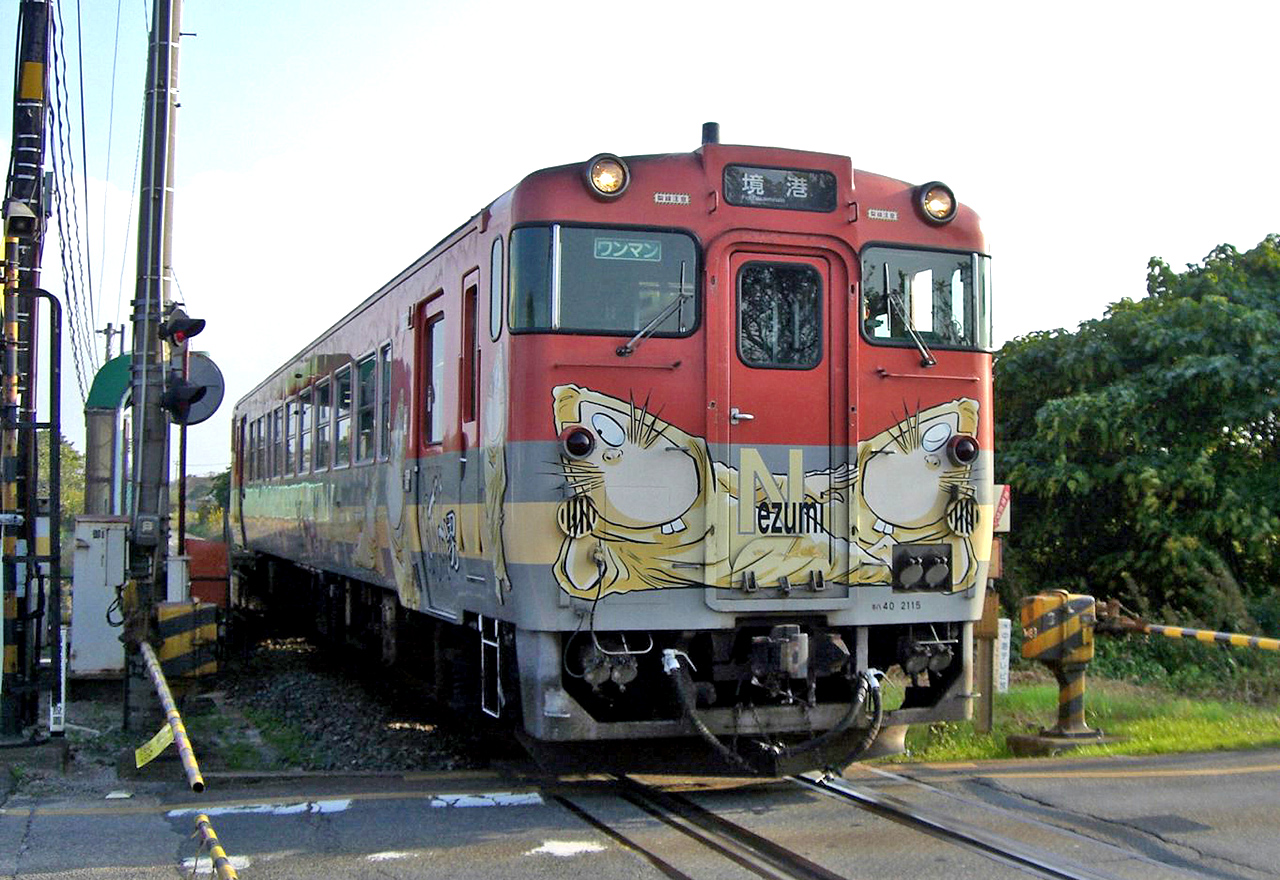
- Nezumi Otoko Train I

Overview
- Native name: 境線
- Owner: JR West
- Locale: Tottori Prefecture
- Termini: Yonago; Sakaiminato
- Stations: 16

Technical
- Line length: 17.9 km (11.1 mi)
- Number of tracks: 1
- Track gauge: 1,067 mm (3 ft 6 in)
- Electrification: Overhead lines 1500 V DC (Yonago - Goto, only for trains that enter and exit Goto train depot)

The Sakai Line (境線, Sakai-sen) is a railway line operated by West Japan Railway Company (JR West) in Tottori Prefecture, Japan. The line connects Yonago and Sakaiminato.

== Services ==
All services on the Sakai Line are Local trains, stopping at every station.

As of October 2025, trains operate approximately every hour (with a single 2-hour morning gap between services).

== Stations ==
All stations are in Tottori Prefecture. The stations have nicknames corresponding to monsters that appear in GeGeGe no Kitaro.

Name		Nickname		Between (km)	Distance (km)	Rapid	Transfers	Location
Yonago	米子	Nezumi-Otoko	ねずみ男	-	0.0	●	Sanin Main Line	Yonago
Bakurōmachi	博労町	Koro-pok-guru	コロポックル	1.0	1.0	｜		Yonago
Fujimichō	富士見町	Zashiki-warashi	ざしきわらし	0.5	1.5	｜		Yonago
Gotō	後藤	Doro-ta-bō	どろたぼう	0.7	2.2	●		Yonago
Sambommatsuguchi	三本松口	Sodehiki-Kozō	そでひき小僧	1.1	3.3	｜		Yonago
Kawasakiguchi	河崎口	Kasabake	傘化け	2.0	5.3	｜		Yonago
Yumigahama	弓ヶ浜	Azukiarai	あずきあらい	1.9	7.2	●		Yonago
Wadahama	和田浜	Tsuchikorobi	つちころび	2.5	9.7	｜		Yonago
Ōshinozuchō	大篠津町	Sunakake Babā	砂かけばばあ	1.4	11.1	｜		Yonago
Yonago Airport	米子空港	Betobeto-san	べとべとさん	1.6	12.7	●		Sakaiminato
Nakahama	中浜	Ushi-oni	牛鬼	0.5	13.2	●		Sakaiminato
Takamatsuchō	高松町	Sunekosuri	すねこすり	1.1	14.3	｜		Sakaiminato
Amariko	余子	Konaki-jijii	こなきじじい	0.7	15.0	●		Sakaiminato
Agarimichi	上道	Ittan-momen	一反木綿	1.3	16.3	｜		Sakaiminato
Babasakichō	馬場崎町	Kijimuna	キジムナー	0.9	17.2	●		Sakaiminato
Sakaiminato	境港	Kitaro	鬼太郎	0.7	17.9	●		Sakaiminato

== Rolling stock ==
- KiHa 40 series 2-car DMU - most cars have an anime livery
- KiHa 126 series[ja] 2-car DMU

== History ==
The entire line opened in 1902. The section to Goto was electrified in 1982, and freight services ceased in 1986.

In 2008, Oshinozu Station was closed and the line relocated 800 m east to serve Yonago Airport, with the new station named accordingly.

JR West announced an 800 million yen renovation of the line's rolling stock (22 cars) in October 2017, to be completed by spring 2019. The renovation will introduce on-board fare payment using ICOCA IC cards (as well as Suica and other Nationwide Mutual Usage Service IC cards). Most stations on the line are unstaffed, requiring fares to be paid to the train driver; the upgrade is intended to increase efficiency, and to better serve travelers from Tokyo, Osaka and other metropolitan areas where IC cards are commonly used for payment of fares.

== See also ==
- List of railway lines in Japan
