= Yonago Station =

Railway station in Yonago, Tottori Prefecture, Japan

Yonago Station 米子駅
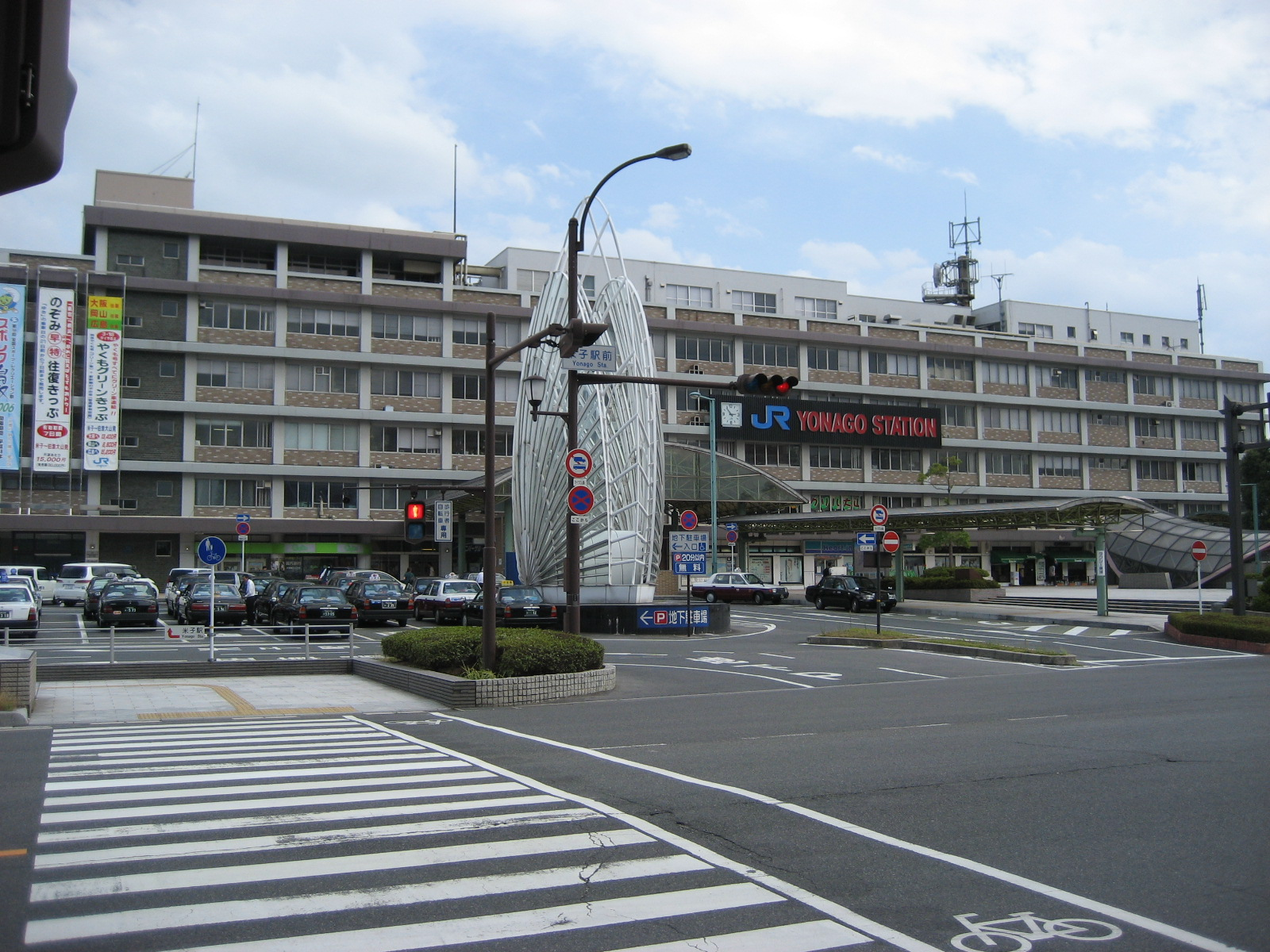
- 'Yonago Station in 2016

General information
- Location: 2 Yayoi-chō, Yonago-shi, Tottori-ken 683-0036; Japan
- Coordinates: 35°25′24″N 133°20′12″E
- Operator: JR West
- Lines: A D San'in Main Line; C Sakai Line; V Hakubi Line
- Platforms: 3 island platforms
- Tracks: 6
- Connections: Bus terminal

Construction
- Structure type: At grade

Other information
- Status: Staffed (Midori no Madoguchi )
- Website: Official website

History
- Opened: 1 November 1902

Passengers
- 2018: 3,699 daily

Services
Preceding station	JR West	Following station
Terminus	San'in Line A	Higashiyamakōen towards Kinosaki-Onsen
Yasugi towards Masuda	San'in Line D	Terminus
Terminus	Hakubi Line	Higashiyamakōen towards Okayama
Bakurōmachi towards Sakaiminato	Sakai Line	Terminus
Location
- Location within Tottori Prefecture Location within Japan

Yonago Station (米子駅, Yonago-eki) is a passenger railway station located in the city of Yonago, Tottori Prefecture, Japan. It is operated by the West Japan Railway Company (JR West).

== Lines ==
Yonago Station is served by the San'in Main Line and is 323.0 kilometers from the terminus of the line at Kyoto. Trains of the Hakubi Line normally continue past the nominal terminus of that line at Hōki-Daisen Station to terminate at Yonago, which is 159.1 kilometers from Okayama. The station is also the terminus of the 17.9 kilometer Sakai Line to Sakaiminato.

== Station layout ==
The station consists of three ground level island platforms serving six tracks. Platform 1 faces the station building, and Platform 0, which is dedicated to the Sakai Line, is located in a cutout on the east side of Platform 1. Platforms 2 and 3 and 4 and 5 are connected by footbridge. In the past, there was a middle track without a platform between platform 1 and platform 2, which was used by freight trains, as well as for deadheaded trains bound for the Goto General Depot. The station has a Midori no Madoguchi staffed ticket office.

=== Platforms ===
0	■ C Sakai Line	for Gotō and Sakaiminato
1	■ A San'in Main Line	for Kurayoshi and Tottori
1	■ V Hakubi Line	for Niimi, Kurashiki and Okayama
2, 3, 4, 5	■ D San'in Main Line	for Matsue, Izumoshi and Masuda
2, 3, 4, 5	■ A San'in Main Line	for Kurayoshi and Tottori
2, 3, 4, 5	■ V Hakubi Line	for Niimi, Kurashiki and Okayama
2, 3, 4, 5	■ C Sakai Line	for Gotō and Sakaiminato

== Adjacent stations ==
«	Service	»
Sanin Main Line
Niimi (Hakubi Line)	Sleeper Limited Express Sunrise Izumo	Yasugi
Neu (Hakubi Line) (Kyōto bound trains); Shoyama (Hakubi Line) (Izumoshi bound trains)	West Express Ginga	Yasugi
Kurayoshi	Limited Express Super Oki	Yasugi
Hoki-Daisen	Limited Express Super Matsukaze	Yasugi
Terminus	Rapid Commuter Liner	Yasugi
Terminus	Rapid Aqua Liner	Yasugi
Hoki-Daisen	Rapid Tottori Liner	Yasugi

== History ==
Yonago Station opened on November 1, 1902.

== Passenger statistics ==
In fiscal 2018, the station was used by an average of 3,699 passengers daily.

== Surrounding area ==
- Yonago City Hall
- Yonago City Museum of Art
- Yonago City Library
- Yonago Chamber of Commerce.
- Tottori University Medical School

== See also ==
- List of railway stations in Japan
