= Sakaiminato Station =

Railway station in Sakaminato, Tottori Prefecture, Japan

Sakaiminato Station 境港駅
- Sakaiminato Station building

General information
- Location: 1-28, Taishō-machi, Sakaiminato-shi, Tottori-ken 684-0004; Japan
- Coordinates: 35°32′42.53″N 133°13′21.58″E
- Operator: JR West
- Line: C Sakai Line
- Distance: 17.9 km (11.1 miles) from Yonago
- Platforms: 1 bay platform
- Tracks: 1

Construction
- Structure type: At grade

Other information
- Status: Unstaffed
- Website: Official website

History
- Opened: 1 November 1902
- Former names: Sakai (until 1919)

Passengers
- 2018: 874 daily
Location
- Location within Tottori Prefecture Location within Japan

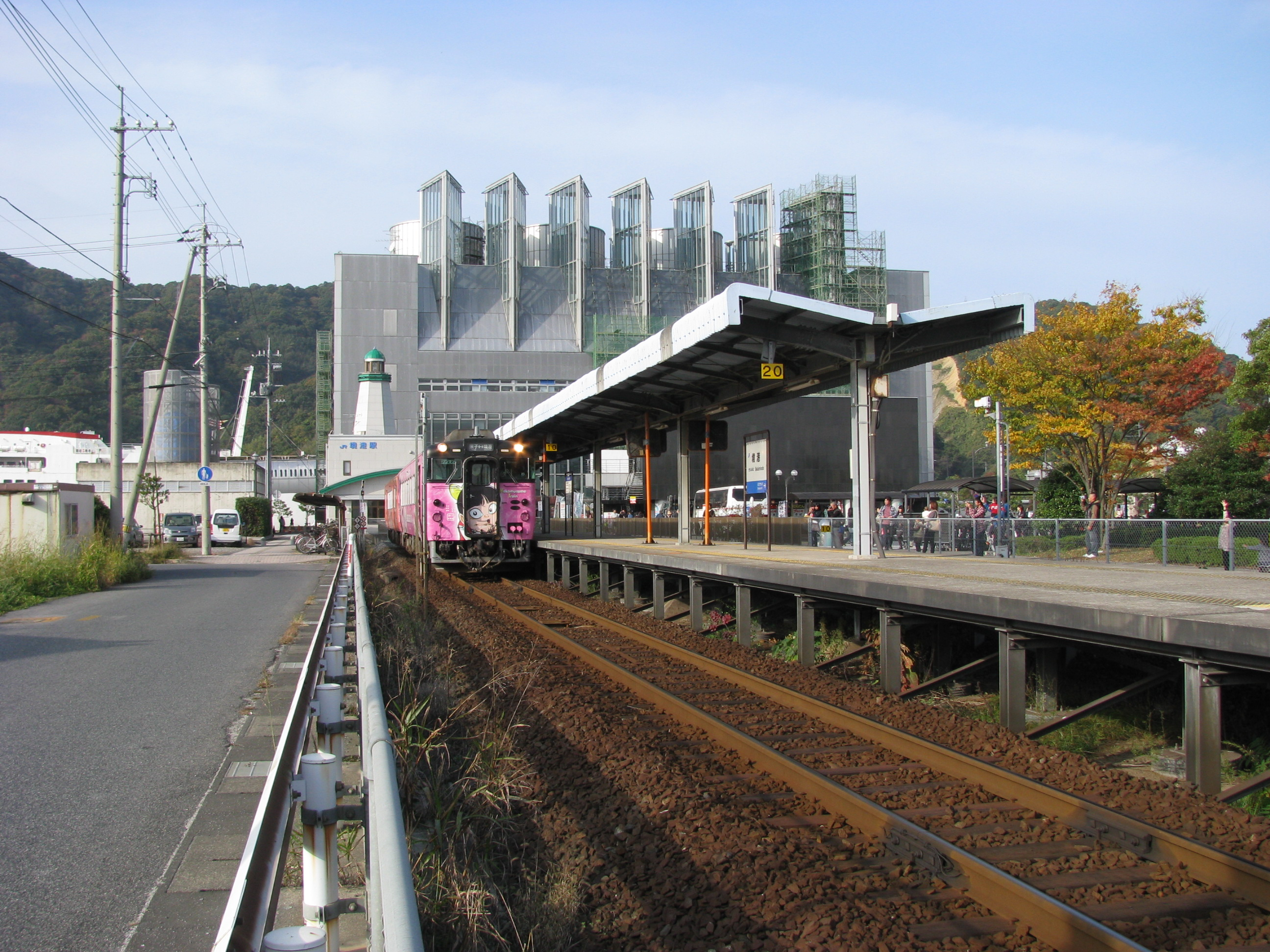
Sakaiminato Station Platform

Sakaiminato Station (境港駅, Sakaiminato-eki) is a passenger railway station located in the city of Sakaiminato, Tottori Prefecture, Japan. It is operated by the West Japan Railway Company (JR West).

== Lines ==
Sakaiminato Station is the western terminus of the Sakai Line, and is located 17.9 kilometers from the opposing terminus of the line at Yonago.

== Station layout ==
The station consists of one ground-level bay platform serving two tracks. The station building has a design reminiscent of a lighthouse at the head end. The station has a Midori no Madoguchi staffed ticket office.

== Adjacent stations ==
«	Service	»
Sakai Line
Babasakichō	Rapid	Terminus
Babasakichō	Local	Terminus

== History ==
Sakaiminato Station opened on November 1, 1902 as Sakai Station (境駅, Sakai-eki). It was renamed July 1, 1918.

== Passenger statistics ==
In fiscal 2018, the station was used by an average of 874 passengers daily.

== Surrounding area ==
- Port of Sakaiminato

== See also ==
- List of railway stations in Japan
