= Yura Station =

Railway station located in Hokuei, Tottori Prefecture, Japan

Yura Station 由良駅
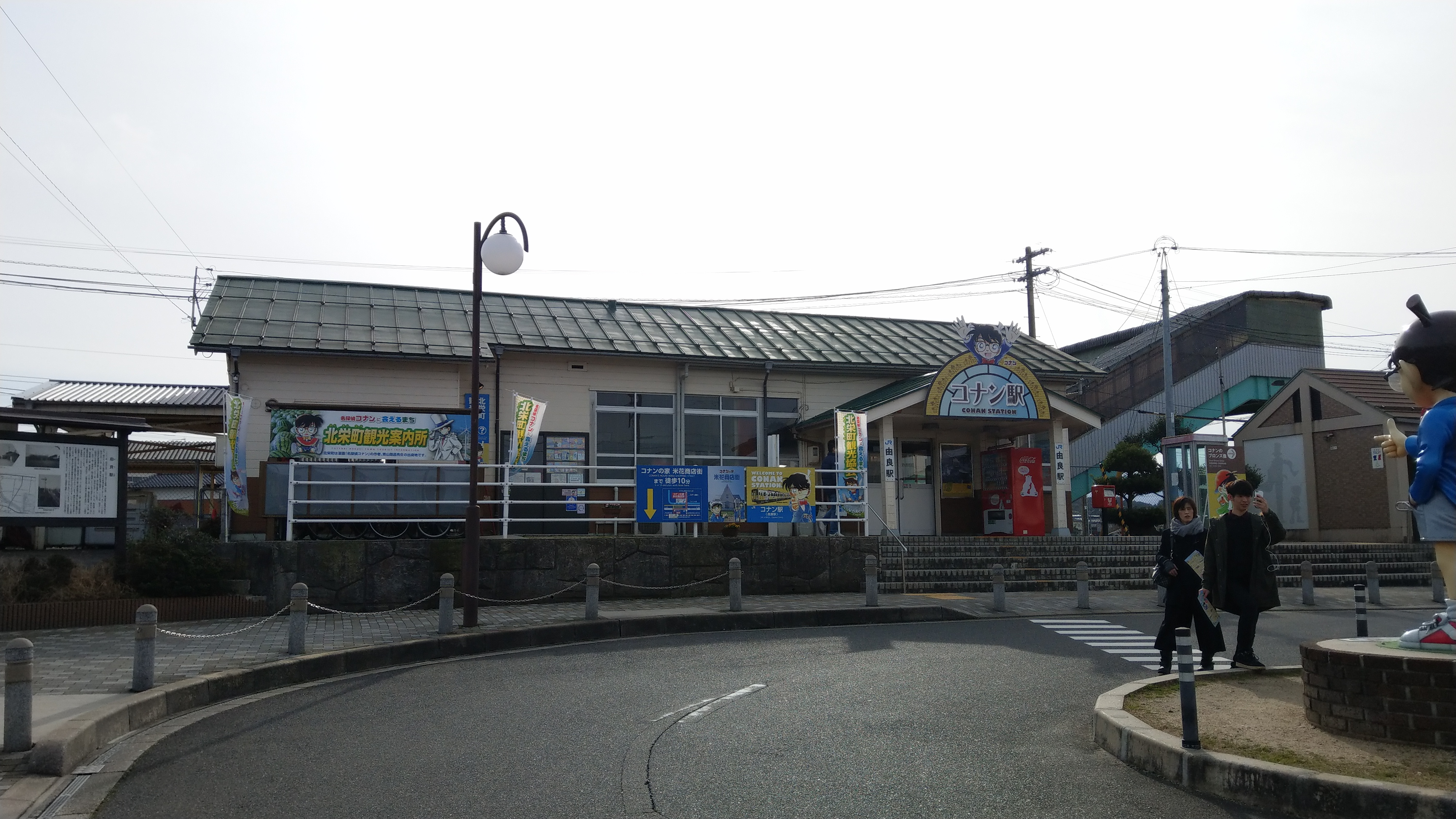
- Yura Station building (January 26th, 2020)

General information
- Location: Yurashuku, Hokuei-chō, Tōhaku-gun, Tottori-shi 689-2221; Japan
- Coordinates: 35°29′24.78″N 133°45′15.90″E
- Operator: JR West
- Line: San'in Main Line
- Distance: 280.1 km (174.0 miles) from Kyoto
- Platforms: 1 side + 1island platform
- Tracks: 3

Construction
- Structure type: At grade

Other information
- Status: Staffed
- Website: Official website

History
- Opened: 20 December 1903

Passengers
- 2018: 1086 daily

Services
Preceding station	JR West	Following station
Urayasu towards Yonago	San'in Line Local	Shimohōjō towards Kinosaki-Onsen
Urayasu towards Yonago	San'in Line Tottori Liner	Shimohōjō towards Kinosaki-Onsen
Location
- Location within Tottori Prefecture Location within Japan

Yura Station (由良駅, Yura-eki) is a passenger railway station located in the town of Hokuei, Tottori Prefecture, Japan. It is operated by the West Japan Railway Company (JR West). It is nicknamed "Conan Station".

== Lines ==
Yura Station is served by the San'in Main Line, and is located 280.1 kilometers from the terminus of the line at Kyoto.

== Station layout ==
The station consists of one ground-level island platform and one ground-level side platform. The station building faces the side platform, and the island platform connected by a footbridge. However, normally only platform 1 is in use. The station is staffed.

=== Platforms ===
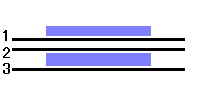
→:for Urayasu ←:for Shimohōjō

1	■ San'in Main Line	for Kurayoshi and Tottori; Urayasu and Yonago
2	■ San'in Main Line	for Urayasu and Yonago
3	■ San'in Main Line	shunt track to allow passage of express trains

== History ==
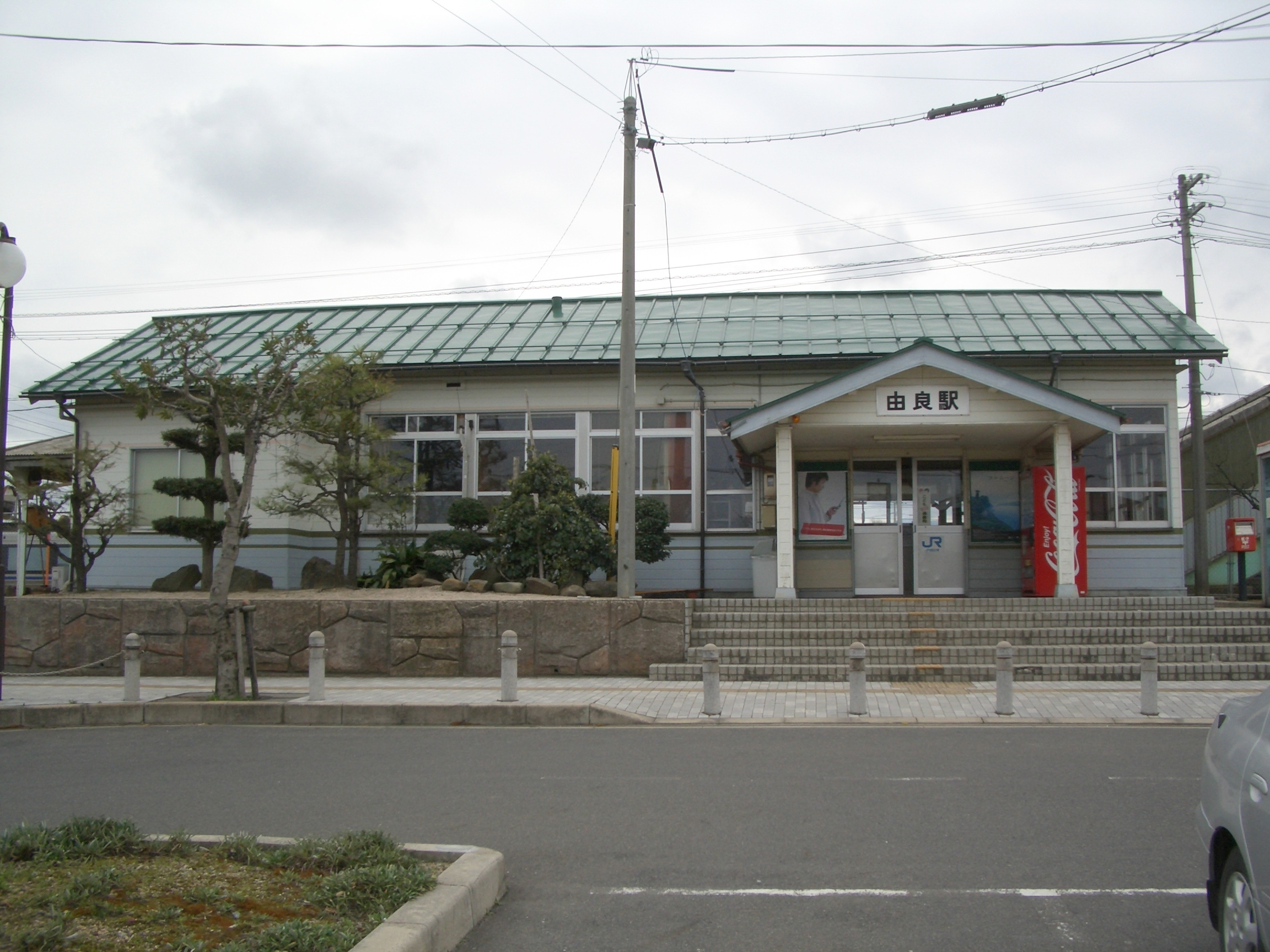
Yura Station old building (December 2007)

Yura Station opened on December 20, 1903. With the privatization of the Japan National Railways (JNR) on April 1, 1987, the station came under the aegis of the West Japan Railway Company.

== Passenger statistics ==
In fiscal 2018, the station was used by an average of 1086 passengers daily.

== Surrounding area ==
- Hokuei Town Hall
- Hokuei Town Library
- Hokuei Town Tourist Information Center
- Gosho Aoyama Manga Factory

== See also ==
- List of railway stations in Japan
