= Higashiyamakōen Station (Tottori) =

Railway station in Yonago, Tottori Prefecture, Japan

Higashiyamakōen Station 東山公園駅
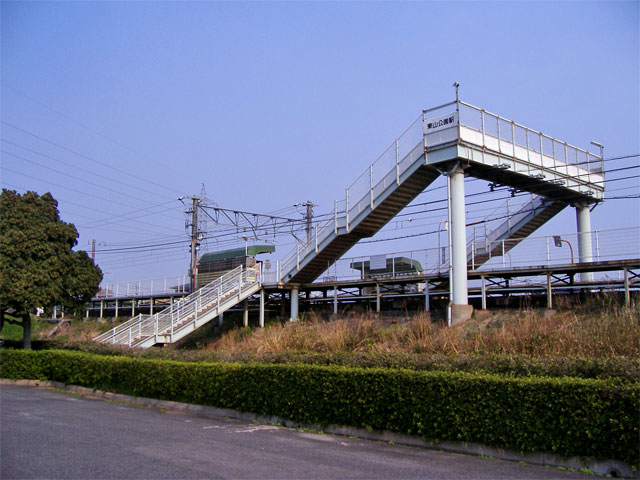
- Higashiyamakōen Station

General information
- Location: 742 Kurumao, Yonago-shi, Tottori-en 683-0006; Japan
- Coordinates: 35°25′51.2″N 133°21′5.2″E
- Operator: JR West
- Lines: San'in San'in Main Line; V Hakubi Line
- Distance: 321.2 km (199.6 miles) from Kyoto
- Platforms: 2 side platforms
- Tracks: 2

Construction
- Structure type: At grade

Other information
- Status: Unstaffed
- Website: Official website

History
- Opened: 18 March 1993

Passengers
- 2018: 746 daily

Services
| Preceding station | JR West | Following station |
|---|---|---|
| Yonago Terminus | San'in Line | Hōki-Daisen towards Kinosaki-Onsen |
| Yonago Terminus | Hakubi Line | Hōki-Daisen towards Okayama |
Location
- Location within Tottori Prefecture Location within Japan

Higashiyamakōen Station (東山公園駅, Higashiyamakōen-eki) is a passenger railway station located in the city of Yonago, Tottori Prefecture, Japan. It is operated by the West Japan Railway Company (JR West).

== Lines ==
Higashiyamakōen Station is served by the San'in Main Line, and is located 321.2 kilometers from the terminus of the line at Kyoto. Trains of the Hakubi Line continuing past the nominal terminus of that line at Hōki-Daisen also stop at this station, which is 157.3 kilometers from Okayama.

== Station layout ==
The station consists of two opposed side platforms located on an embankment, connected a footbridge.The station is unattended and there is no station building.

=== Platforms ===
| 1 | ■ San'in Main Line | for Kurayoshi and Tottori |
| 1 | ■ Hakubi Line | Niimi Okayama |
| 2 | ■ San'in Main Line | for Yonago and Matsue |
| 2 | ■ Hakubi Line | Yonago |

== History ==
Higashiyamakōen Station opened on 18 March 1993.

== Passenger statistics ==
In fiscal 2018, the station was used by an average of 746 passengers daily.

== Surrounding area ==
- Yonago City Higashiyama Athletic Park
- Yonago Municipal Higashiyama Athletic Stadium
- Yonago Municipal Baseball Stadium

== See also ==
- List of railway stations in Japan
