= Urayasu Station =

Urayasu Station (浦安駅) is the name of two train stations in Japan:

- Urayasu Station (Chiba)
- Urayasu Station (Tottori)
