= List of Case Closed volumes (101–current) =

The Case Closed manga, known in Japan as Detective Conan (名探偵コナン, Meitantei Conan), is written by Gosho Aoyama and serialized in Shogakukan's shōnen manga magazine Weekly Shōnen Sunday since January 19, 1994. Since Case Closed's premiere, over 1,000 chapters have been released in Japan, making it the 25th longest running manga series. Several adaptations based on Case Closed have been made, including an anime series and animated films. A database consisting of all the cases from the manga was launched in 2007. Viz Media announced its licensing of the series on June 1, 2004, and following Funimation Entertainment's English localization, released the series under the name Case Closed with renamed characters. The series follows high school detective Jimmy Kudo who was transformed into a child after being forced to swallow a poison.

The tankōbon volumes from 101 onwards contain all the chapters starting from 1070.

== Volumes ==
No.	Title	Original release date	English release date
101	The Goddess of Wind	April 13, 2022; 978-4-09-851054-2	January 12, 2027; 978-1-9747-6610-9
1070. "To Think We'd Meet at Such a Place..." (こんな所で会えるとは..., Kon'natokorode aeru to wa?); 1071. "Time Capsule" (タイムカプセル, Taimu kapuseru); 1072. "The Popular Girl of Class 6-A" (6年A組の人気者, 6-nen A-gumi no Ninkimono); 1073. "The Goddess of Wind" (風の女神, Kaze no megami); 1074. "Tracking the Wind" (風の追跡, Kaze no tsuiseki); 1075. "Seized by the Wind" (風の確保, Kaze no kakuho); 1076. "Provocation" (挑発, Chōhatsu); 1077. "Smoke" (煙霧, Enmu); 1078. "Reenactment" (再現, Saigen); 1079. "What was Left in the Notebook" (手帳に遺されたもの, Techō ni nokosa reta mono); 1080. "The Cold Case" (瞑れる事件, Nemureru jiken)
102		September 15, 2022; 978-4-09-851255-3	April 13, 2027; 978-1-9747-6611-6
1081. "Successors to The Legacy" (遺志を継ぐ者, Ishi o tsugu mono); 1082. "Murder on the Border" (ライン上の殺人, Rain-jō no Satsujin); 1083. "Memories of the Border" (境目の思い出, Sakaime no Omoide); 1084. "Micchan's House" (ミッちゃんのお家, Mitchan no Ouchi); 1085. "15's Suffering" (15の受難, Jūgo no Junan); 1086. "18's Recollection" (18の想起, Jūhachi no Sōki); 1087. "Idiots" (バカ共, Baka-domo); 1088. "A Sweet Trap" (甘い罠; Amai Wana); 1089. "The Half-Open Door" (半開きの扉, Hanbiraki no Tobira); 1090. "The Truth Behind the Door" (扉の先の真実, Tobira no Saki no Shinjitsu); 1091. "Collaboration" (コラボ, Korabo)
103		April 12, 2023; 978-4-09-852026-8	—
1092. "New Impulse" (新しい刺激, Atarashī Shigeki); 1093. "Photogenic" (映え, Bae); 1094. "A Chance Encounter" (偶然の出会い, Gūzen no deai); 1095. "The Three Ciphers" (3つの暗号, 3Ttsu no angō); 1096. "The Secret of The Squares" (四角の秘密, Shikaku no himitsu); 1097. "The Chaperones" (引率者, Insotsu-sha); 1098. "Beach House" (海の家, Uminoya); 1099. "Fall Back" (下がれ, Sagare); 1100. "Concealment" (煙滅, Enmetsu); 1101. "Investigation" (捜索, Sōsaku); 1102. "Two Faces" (表裏, Hyōri)
104		October 18, 2023; 978-4-09-852850-9	—
1103. "A Monochrome Opening" (白黒の序盤, Shirokuro no Joban); 1104. "The Bloodstained Knight" (血染めの騎士, Chizome no Kishi); 1105. "Tears of Surrender" (陥落の涙, Kanraku no Namida); 1106. "The Sharp-eyed Devil" (達眼の悪魔, Tatsugan no Akuma); 1107. "The Watchtower Bishop" (遠見の角行, Tōmi no Kakugyō); 1108. "The Meijin's Enclosure" (名人の囲い, Meijin no Kakoi); 1109. "The Queen's Gambit" (女王の謀, Kuīnzu Gyanbitto); 1110. "Unsettling Parents' Visit Day" (不穏な参観日, Fuon'na Sankan-bi); 1111. "The Mystery of the Flowerbed" (花壇の怪, Kadan no Kai); 1112. "The Spilled Truth" (零れた真実, Koboreta Shinjitsu); 1113. "The Butler and the Mystery" (執事と謎, Shitsuji to Nazo)
105		April 10, 2024; 978-4-09-853217-9	—
1114. "The Butler and the Young Lady" (執事とお嬢様, Shitsuji to Ojō-sama); 1115. "The Butler and the Detectives" (執事と探偵, Shitsuji to Tantei); 1116. "Shelter from the Mountain Rain" (山中の雨宿り, Sanchū no Amayadori); 1117. "The Mystery of the Chastisement Room" (折檻部屋の謎, Sekkan-heya no Nazo); 1118. "Flying Up" (舞い上がって..., Maiagatte...); 1119. "The Sky" (天空, Tenkū); 1120. "Substitute" (代役, Daiyaku); 1121. "Proof" (証明, Shōmei); 1122. "Sleuth" (探偵, Tantei); 1123. "The Disappeared Kidnapper" (消えた誘拐犯, Kieta Yūkai-han)
106		October 18, 2024; 978-4-09-853633-7	—
1124. "The Strange Die" (奇妙なサイコロ, Kimyōna Saikoro); 1125. "Two-Front Strategy" (二拠点作戦, Nikyoten Sakusen); 1126. "Suspicious Visitors" (不審な来客, Fushin'na Raikyaku); 1127. "The Time is Midnight" (時限は零時, Jigen wa Reiji); 1128. "The Trigger for a Counterattack" (反撃の起爆剤, Hangeki no Kibaku-zai); 1129. "Dark Red Play Opening" (朱殷色の開演, Shu An-iro no Kaien); 1130. "The Bright Yellow First Day" (支子色の初日, Sasōko-iro no Shonichi); 1131. "The Bluish Gray Middle Act" (鉛色の中日, Namari-iro no Chūnichi); 1132. "The Light Gray Penultimate Act" (薄墨色の前楽, Usuzumi-iro no Maeraku); 1133. "The Dark Red Last Act" (茜色の千秋楽, Akane-iro no Senshūraku)
107		April 18, 2025; 978-4-09-854079-2	—
1134. "A Chance Meeting" (邂逅遭遇, Kaikō Sōgū); 1135. "Cutting the Gordian Knot" (快刀乱麻, Kaitōranma); 1136. "A Once-in-a-Lifetime Encounter" (一期一会, Ichi-go Ichi-e); 1137. "The Sacred Light of the Dead" (屍人の御燈, Shibito no Miakashi); 1138. "The Flames Burn Again" (火はまた燃える, Hi wa Mata Moeru); 1139. "Sifting through the Ashes" (火炎の後始末, Kaen no Atoshimatsu); 1140. "Entrusted" (託された証, Takusareta Akashi); 1141. "Richard's Tryst" (小五郎の密会, Kogorō no Mitsukai); 1142. "Who's the Liar?" (ウソつきは･･･, Usotsuki wa...?); 1143. "Like a Puff of Smoke" (煙のように, Kemuri no yō ni)
108		April 8, 2026; 978-4-09-854532-2	—
1144. "The Man Who Was Invited" (呼び出された男, Yobidasareta Otoko); 1145. "A Risky Reunion" (危険な再会, Kiken na Saikai); 1146. "This Place is Dangerous..." (危ないから･･･, Abunai Kara...); 1147. "On the Edge of Chaos" (混沌の正念場, Konton no Shōnenba); 1148. "The Visitor of Chaos" (混沌からの来訪者, Konton Kara no Raihōsha); 1149. "The Fate of Chaos" (混沌の因縁, Konton no Innen); 1150. "The Pursers of Chaos" (混沌の追跡者たち, Konton no Tsuisekisha-tachi); 1151. "Blackmail Photo" (脅しの写真, Odoshi no Shashin); 1152. "Risky Photo" (ヤバイ写真, Yabai Shashin); 1153. "The Truth in the Photo" (写り込んだ真実, Utsurikonda Shinjitsu); 1154. "The Ring and the Hot Spring" (指輪と温泉, Yubiwa to Onsen)
109		October 16, 2026; 978-4-09-854855-2	—
1155. The Whereabouts of the Ring (指輪の行方, Yubiwa no Yukue); 1156. The Magic to Find the Ring (指輪を見つける魔法, Yubiwa o Mitsukeru Mahō); 1157. Under the Starry Sky... (星空の下で･･･, Hoshizora no Shita de...); 1158. The Eerie Sound (不気味な音, Bukimi na Oto); 1159. It Is Still Okay... (まだ大丈夫･･･, Mada Daijōbu...); 1160. Escape from the Zodiac Mansion (十二支の館からの脱出, Jūnishi no Yakata kara no Dasshutsu); 1161. Don't Give Up (負けんなよ, Maken'na Yo); 1162. The Detective on Our Side (自陣の探偵, Jijin no Tantei); 1163. The Teacher's Gift (先生の贈り物, Sensei no Okurimono); 1164. Deadly Pranks (命懸けのイタズラ, Inochigake no Itazura)

== Chapters not yet published in volume format ==
1165. Lonely Malice (孤独な殺意, Kodokuna Satsui)
1166. Ms. Wakasa's Requital (先生のお返し, Sensei no Okaeshi)
1167. Ran, Lost (迷い込んだ蘭, Mayoikonda Ran)
1168. Deliberate Evidence (作為的な痕跡, Sakuitekina Konseki)
1169. The Bloody Chord (血染めのコード, Chizome no Kōdo)
