= Sainoo temple ruins =

Buddhist temple in Kotoura, Tottori, Japan

- 斎尾廃寺跡 (Japanese)
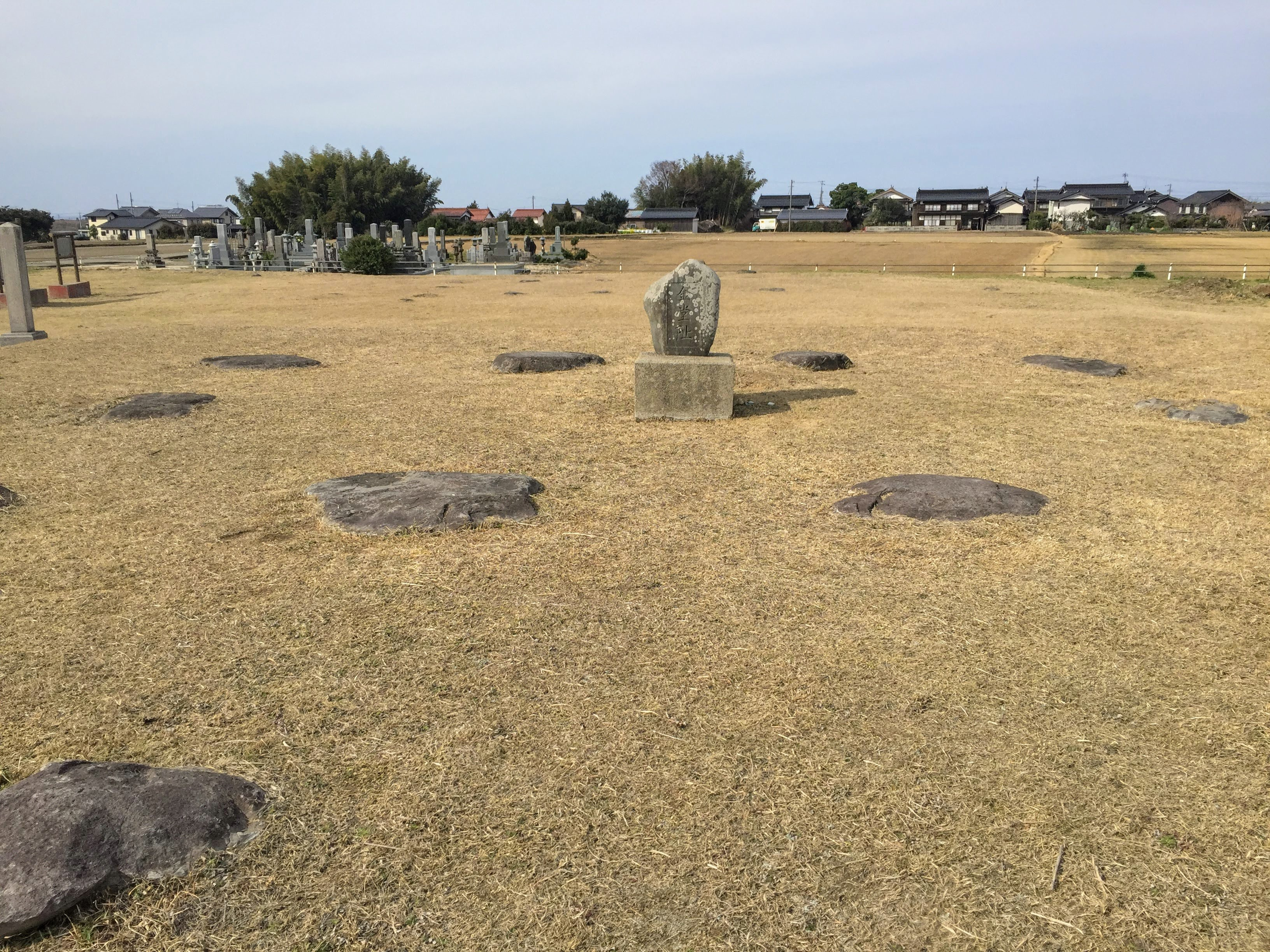
- Foundations of the Kondo

- Sainoo temple ruins Sainoo temple ruins (Japan)
- Interactive map of Sainoo temple ruins
- 35°28′53.4″N 133°42′41.4″E
- Type: temple ruins
- Periods: Hakuhō period
- Location: Kotoura, Tottori, Japan
- Region: San'in region

History
- Built: 6th century AD

Site notes
- Public access: Yes (park, museum)

Sainoo temple ruins (斎尾廃寺跡, Sai-no-o Haiji ato) is an archaeological site with the ruins of a Hakuhō period Buddhist temple located in the Tsukishita neighborhood of the town of Kotoura, Tottori Prefecture, in the San'in region of Japan. It was designated as a National Historic Site in 1935 with the designation changed to that of a Special National Historic Site in 1952. Due to the good condition of the remains, it is the only nationally designated Special Historic Site in the San'in region; however, as the temple does not appear in any documented history, its actual name and history are unknown.

== History ==
The Sainoo temple ruins occupy a rectangular enclosure measuring 160 meters east-to-west, 250 meters north-to-south. Within are foundation stones indicating that the temple had a layout patterned after Hōryū-ji in Ikaruga, Nara, orientated to the south, with a pagoda to the west and the Kondō to the east. Archaeological excavations have found the foundations of the Middle Gate, cloisters and the bell tower. Fragments of roof tiles and Buddhist images have also been found. A reproduction model of the temple and some of the excavated items are displayed at Kotoura Town Adult Learning Center "Manabi Town Tohaku" and Hakuhokan Museum near the site.

The site is about ten minutes by car from Urayasu Station on the JR West San'in Main Line.

== See also ==
- List of Historic Sites of Japan (Tottori)
