= Shimohōjō Station =

Railway station located in Hokuei, Tottori Prefecture, Japan

Shimohōjō Station 下北条駅
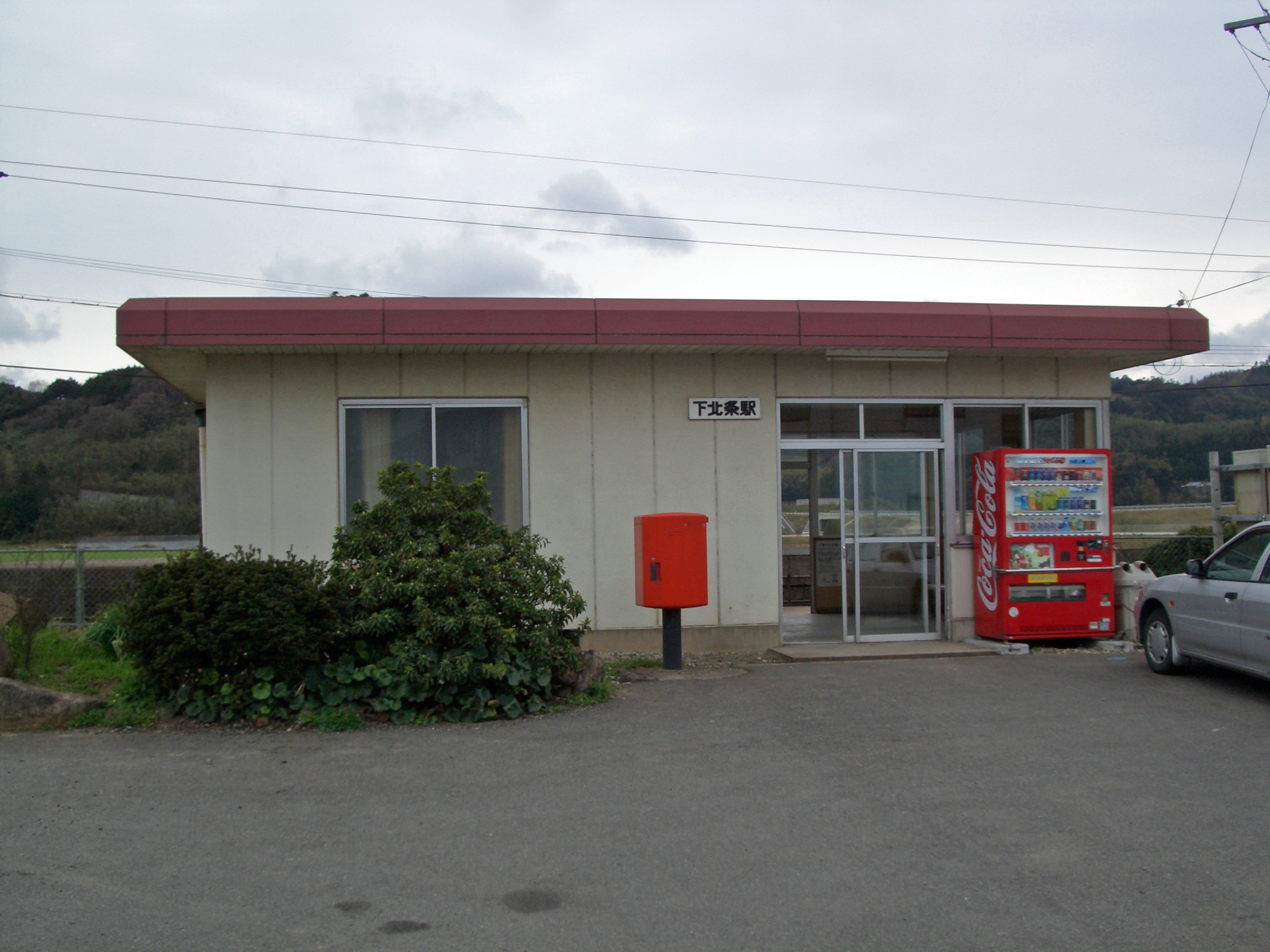
- Shimohōjō Station, March 2008

General information
- Location: Kitao, Hokuei-chō, Tōhaku-gun, Tottori-shi 689-2114; Japan
- Coordinates: 35°28′54.89″N 133°48′32.67″E
- Operator: JR West
- Line: San'in Main Line
- Distance: 275.2 km (171.0 miles) from Kyoto
- Platforms: 1 island platforms
- Tracks: 2

Construction
- Structure type: At grade

Other information
- Status: Unstaffed
- Website: Official website

History
- Opened: 10 March 1915

Passengers
- 2018: 140 daily
Location
- Location within Tottori Prefecture Location within Japan

Shimohōjō Station (下北条駅, Shimohōjō-eki) is a passenger railway station located in the town of Hokuei, Tottori Prefecture, Japan. It is operated by the West Japan Railway Company (JR West).

== Lines ==
Shimohōjō Station is served by the San'in Main Line, and is located 275.2 km (171.0 mi) from the terminus of the line at Kyoto.

== Station layout ==
The station consists of one ground-level island platform connected by a level crossing to the station building. Trains bound for Tottori arrive and depart from the platform on the station building side, and trains bound for Yonago arrive and depart from the platform on the opposite side. The station is unattended.

=== Platforms ===
1	■ San'in Main Line	for Kurayoshi and Tottori
2	■ San'in Main Line	for Urayasu and Yonago

== Adjacent stations ==
West Japan Railway Company (JR West)

«	Service	»
Sanin Main Line
Limited Express Super Oki: Does not stop at this station
Limited Express Super Matsukaze: Does not stop at this station
Kurayoshi	Express "Tottori Liner"	Yura
Kurayoshi	Local	Yura

== History ==
Shimohōjō Station opened on March 10, 1915. With the privatization of the Japan National Railways (JNR) on April 1, 1987, the station came under the aegis of the West Japan Railway Company.

== Passenger statistics ==
In fiscal 2018, the station was used by an average of 140 passengers daily.

== Surrounding area ==
- Hojo Yubara Road Hokuei IC
- Japan National Route 313
- Tottori Prefectural Route 201

== See also ==
- List of railway stations in Japan
