= Mount Senjō =

Mount Senjō can refer to:

- Mount Senjō (Akaishi) (Senjō-ga-take), a mountain in the Akaishi Mountain range between Yamanashi and Nagano Prefectures, Japan
- Mount Senjō (Tottori), a mountain in the Daisen range in Tottori Prefecture, Japan.
