= Mount Senjō (Tottori) =

Geographical feature in Japan

- 船上山
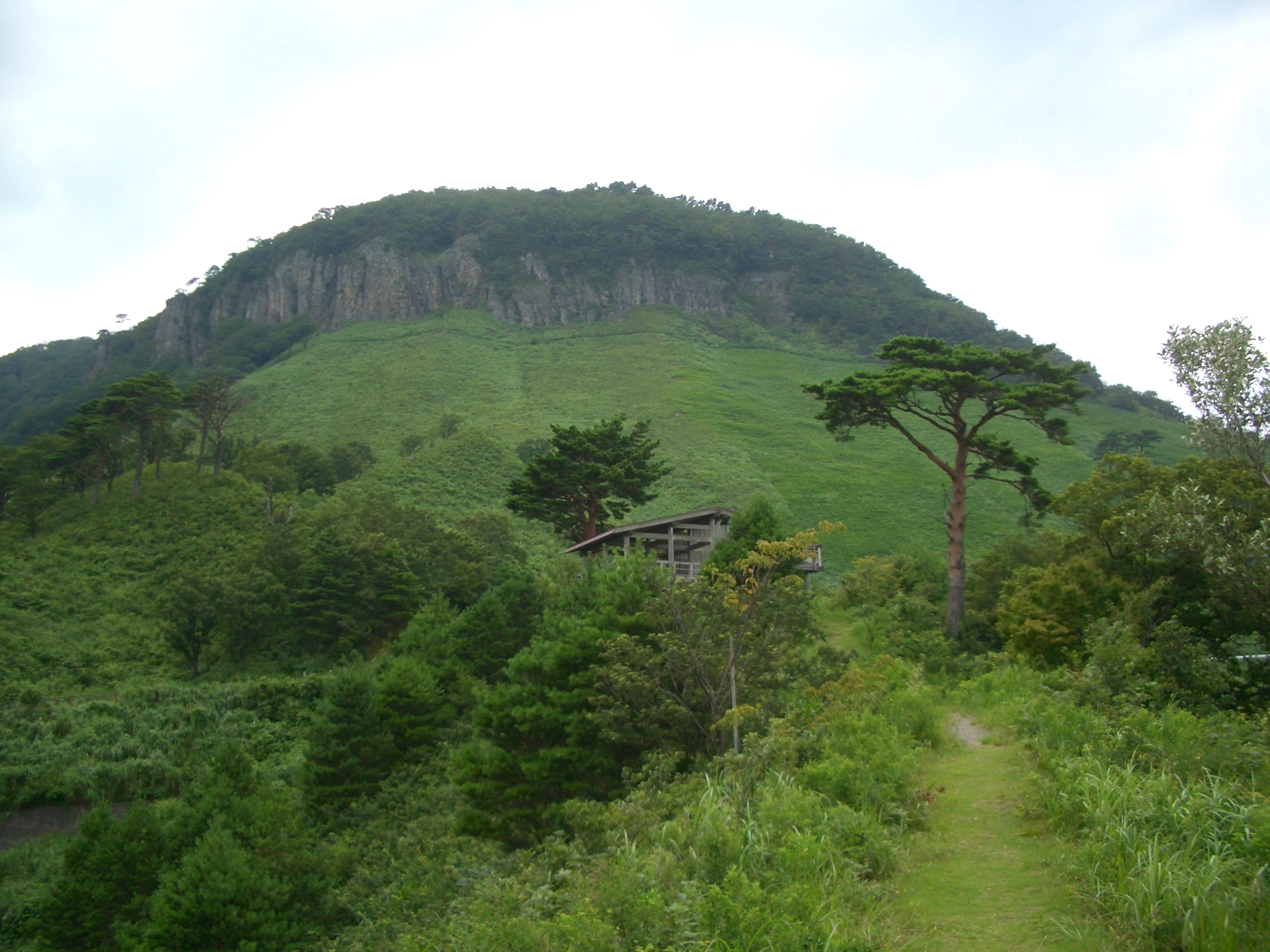
- Mount Senjō

Highest point
- Elevation: 687 m (2,254 ft)
- Coordinates: 35°25′42″N 133°35′29″E

Naming
- Language of name: Japanese

Geography
- Location within Japan
- Location: Kotoura, Tottori, Japan
- Parent range: Chūgoku Mountains

Climbing
- Easiest route: Hiking
- National Historic Site of Japan

Mount Senjō (船上山, Senjō-san) is a mountain in the town of Kotoura, Tottori Prefecture, Japan. It has an elevation of 687 metres and is part of the Daisen volcanic belt. It is within the borders of the Daisen-Oki National Park.

== Outline ==
Mt. Senjō is believed to have been created by a lava flow caused by the ancient Daisen volcano between 1.8 million years ago and 500,000 years ago, which subsequently was eroded over a long period of time, forming a unique mountain shape. Alternatively, there is a theory that it is the outer rim of a caldera formed by activity of the ancient Daisen volcano. The top of Mt. Senjō is wide and gentle, but the surroundings are steep slopes, especially on the eastern slope, where steep cliffs formed by cooling and solidifying lava extend for several kilometers.

== History ==
Along with Mount Daisen and Mount Mitoku, Mount Senjō has been regarded as a sacred mountain by the shugendō religion. A temple called Chishaku-ji was founded in the Wadō era (708-715) and the remains of about 20 temple structures have been found on the summit. At the end of the Kamakura period, Emperor Go-Daigo was exiled to the Oki Islands in 1331 by the Kamakura shogunate. He managed to escape in 1333, and although aiming for Izumo Province, the winds blew his ship eastward and he drifted ashore in the port of Nawa in Hōki Province. The shugo of Hōki, Nawa Nagatoshi offered Emperor Go-Daigo sanctuary and the use of his fortified residence at Mount Senjō.

=== Battle of Mount Senjōsan ===
On April 4, 1333, Sasaki Kiyotaka, the shugo of Oki Province, led his forces against Mt. Senjō in an attempt to recapture Emperor Go-Daigo, and was assisted by the local Ogamo and Kasuya clans. On Emperor Go-Daigo's side, the armed monks of Mount Daisen came to his aid. At Mount Senjō, the Nawa forces tied four to five hundred banners to trees to make their army appear to be much larger than it was in reality, and occasionally shot arrows to keep the shogunate forces in check. During the assault on the mountain, Sasaki Masatsuna was struck by an arrow in his right eye and died. Sasaki Sadamune was trapped in a pocket and surrendered. Unaware of the setbacks of the commanders on his flanks, Sasaki Kiyotaka led he main attack, but his forces became confused on the mountain paths and the Nawa army, taking advantage of a storm in the evening, drove many of the attackers off the cliffs. As a result of the defeat of the shogunate forces, numerous western warlords who had been hesitant in support switched sides and pledged fealty to Emperor Go-Daigo against the Kamakura shogunate. According to the medieval chronicle Taiheiki, this enabled Emperor Go-Daigo conclusively defeat the Sasaki clan and to capture all of Hōki Province. The Kamakura shogunate dispatched two armies to subdue the rebellion; however the force led by Hōjō Takaie along the San'yōdō highway was defeated by the Akamatsu clan and the force led by Ashikaga Takauji switched sides and destroyed the shogunate's stronghold of Rokuhara Tandai in Kyoto. This enabled Emperor Go-Daido to return in triumph to Kyoto in June.

=== Senjōsan temporary palace site ===
As one of the important sites of the Genkō War, the location of the battle was commemorated by the post-Meiji restoration Japanese government. Per the Taiheiki chronicle, rice that could not be transported to Mount Senjō before the battle was burn along with the rice granary buildings to prevent it from being used by the pro-shogunate forces. The discovery of carbonized rice grains behind the Nawa Jinja, a Shinto shrine near the base of Mount Senjō, led to the conclusion that this must have been the site of the Nawa residence. As this had been the residence of Emperor Go-Daigo for some 80 days after his escape from Oki, this location was declared to be the Senjōsan temporary palace site (船上山行宮跡, Senjōsan angū ato), and was designated as a National Historic Site in 1932.

The trailhead to climb Mt. Senjō is about 15 minutes by car from Akasaki Station on the JR West San'in Main Line.

== See also ==
- List of Historic Sites of Japan (Tottori)
- List of mountains in Japan
