= Hōki-Daisen Station =

Railway station in Yonago, Tottori Prefecture, Japan

Hōki-Daisen Station 伯耆大山駅
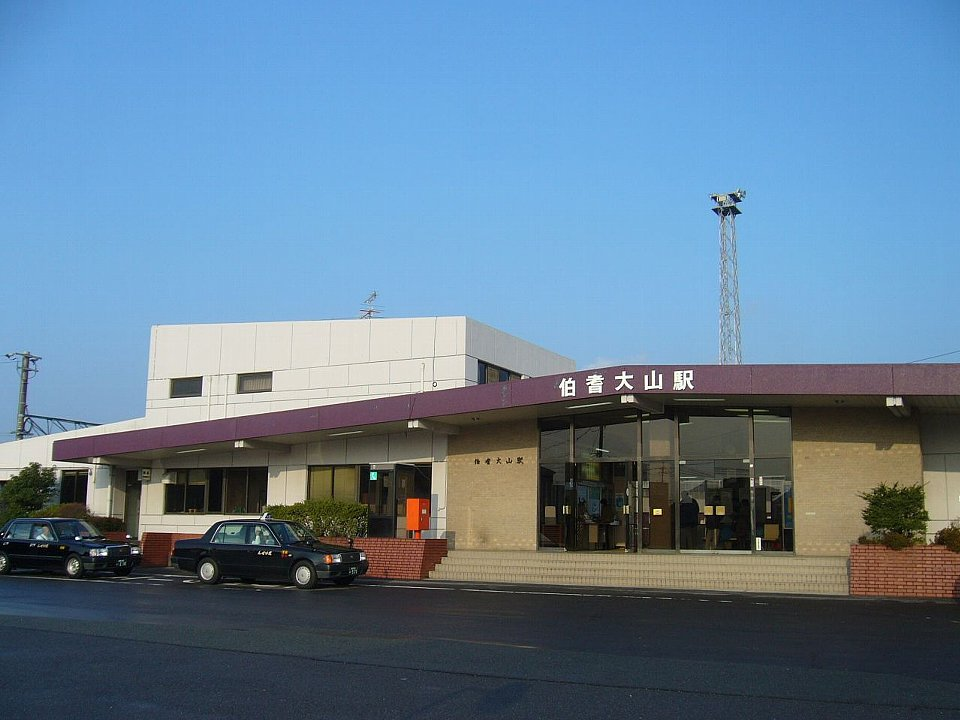
- Hōki-Daisen Station building, January 2007

General information
- Location: 237-4 Kakaya, Yonago-shi, Tottori-ken 689-3543; Japan
- Coordinates: 35°25′46.04″N 133°23′0.29″E
- Operator: JR West; JR Freight
- Lines: San'in San'in Main Line; V Hakubi Line
- Distance: 318.2 km (197.7 miles) from Kyoto; 138.4 km (86.0 miles) from Kurashiki
- Platforms: 1 side + 1 island platform
- Tracks: 3

Construction
- Structure type: At grade

Other information
- Status: Unstaffed
- Website: Official website

History
- Opened: 1 December 1902
- Former names: Kumano (to 1911); Daisen (to 1917)

Passengers
- 2019: 1,472 daily

Services
Preceding station	JR West	Following station
Higashiyamakōen towards Shimonoseki	San'in Main Line A	Yodoe towards Masuda
Yonago Terminus	San'in Line Tottori Liner	Akasaki towards Kinosaki-Onsen
Higashiyamakōen towards Yonago	Hakubi Line	Kishimoto towards Okayama
Location
- Location within Tottori Prefecture Location within Japan

Hōki-Daisen Station (伯耆大山駅, Hōki-Daisen-eki) is a passenger railway station located in the city of Yonago, Tottori Prefecture, Japan. It is operated by the West Japan Railway Company (JR West). It is also a freight depot for the Japan Freight Railway Company (JR Freight).

== Lines ==
Hōki-Daisen Station is served by the San'in Main Line and is 318.2 kilometers from the terminus of the line at Kyoto. It is also the northern terminus of the Hakubi Line, and is located 138.4 kilometers from the opposing terminus at Kurashiki and 154.3 kilometers from Okayama. All trains on the Hakubi Line continue past this station to Yonago Station via the San'in Main Line tracks. Some limited express 'Yakumo' trains on the Hakubi Line and some limited express 'Super Matsukaze' trains on the San'in Main Line stop here (only inbound trains in the morning and outbound trains in the evening). Other limited express trains pass. All Rapid Tottori Liners stop here.

== Station layout ==
The station consists of one ground-level side platform and one ground-level island platform. The station buildings adjacent to the side platform and connected with the island platform by a footbridge. The station building is staffed.

=== Platforms ===
1	■ San'in Main Line ( Hakubi Line)	for Yonago and Matsue
2, 3	■ San'in Main Line ( Hakubi Line)	for Kurayoshi and Tottori; Niimi and Okayama

== History ==
Hōki-Daisen Station opened on December 1, 1902 as Kumanto Station (熊党駅). It was renamed Daisen Station (大山駅) on October 10, 1911 and to its present name on May 1, 1917. The current station building was completed in 1981. With the privatization of the Japan National Railways (JNR) on April 1, 1987, the station came under the aegis of the West Japan Railway Company.

== Passenger statistics ==
In fiscal 2018, the station was used by an average of 1500 passengers daily.

== Surrounding area ==
- Oji Paper Yonago Mill
- Yonago Shoin High School
- Minokaya Junior High School, Hiyoshi Tsumura Junior High School

== See also ==
- List of railway stations in Japan
