= Yabase Station =

Railway station located in Kotoura, Tottori Prefecture, Japan

Yabase Station 八橋駅
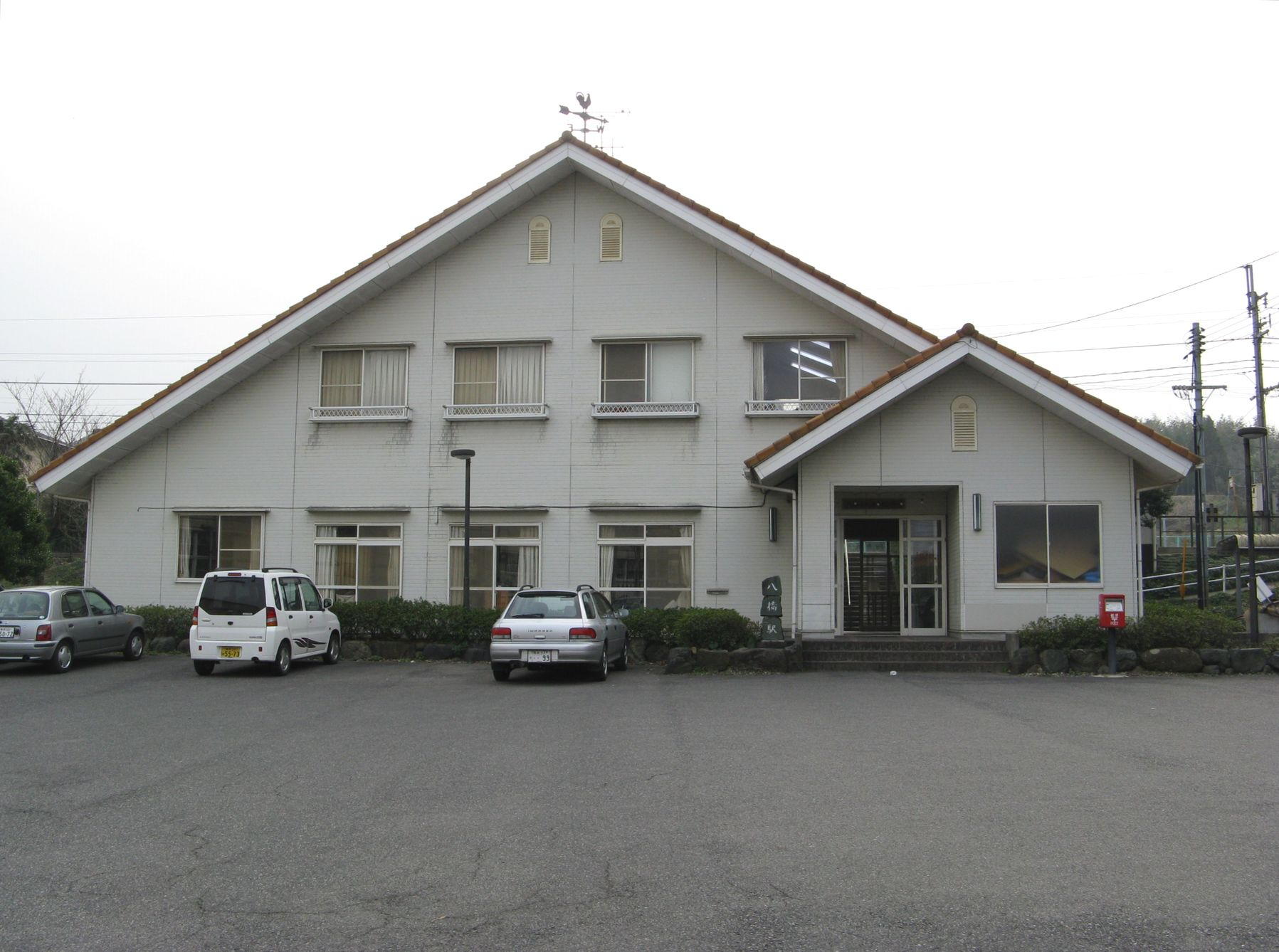
- Yabase Station, January 2008

General information
- Location: 988 Shimokatsumi, Yabase, Kotoura-chō, Tōhaku-gun, Tottori-ken 689-2301; Japan
- Coordinates: 35°30′11.82″N 133°40′25.16″E
- Operator: JR West
- Line: San'in Main Line
- Distance: 287.6 km (178.7 miles) from Kyoto
- Platforms: 1 side platform
- Tracks: 1

Construction
- Structure type: At grade

Other information
- Status: Unstaffed
- Website: Official website

History
- Opened: 4 July 1928

Passengers
- 2018: 142 daily

Services
Preceding station	JR West	Following station
Akasaki towards Yonago	San'in Line Local	Urayasu towards Kinosaki-Onsen
Location
- Location within Tottori Prefecture Location within Japan

Yabase Station (八橋駅, Yabase-eki) is a passenger railway station located in the town of Kotoura, Tottori Prefecture, Japan. It is operated by the West Japan Railway Company (JR West).

== Lines ==
Yabase Station is served by the San'in Main Line, and is located 287.6 kilometers from the terminus of the line at Kyoto.

== Station layout ==
The station consists of one ground-level side platform serving a single bi-directional track. The station building is on the right side facing Yonago. The station is unattended.

== History ==
Yabase Station opened on July 4, 1928 as a temporary seasonal stop. It was upgraded to a year-round station on August 20, 1938. With the privatization of the Japan National Railways (JNR) on April 1, 1987, the station came under the aegis of the West Japan Railway Company.

== Passenger statistics ==
In fiscal 2018, the station was used by an average of 142 passengers daily.

== Surrounding area ==
- Yabase Castle ruins
- Yabase Beach
- Kotoura Municipal Yabase Elementary School

== See also ==
- List of railway stations in Japan
