= Kishimoto Station =

Railway station in Hōki, Tottori Prefecture, Japan

Kishimoto Station 岸本駅
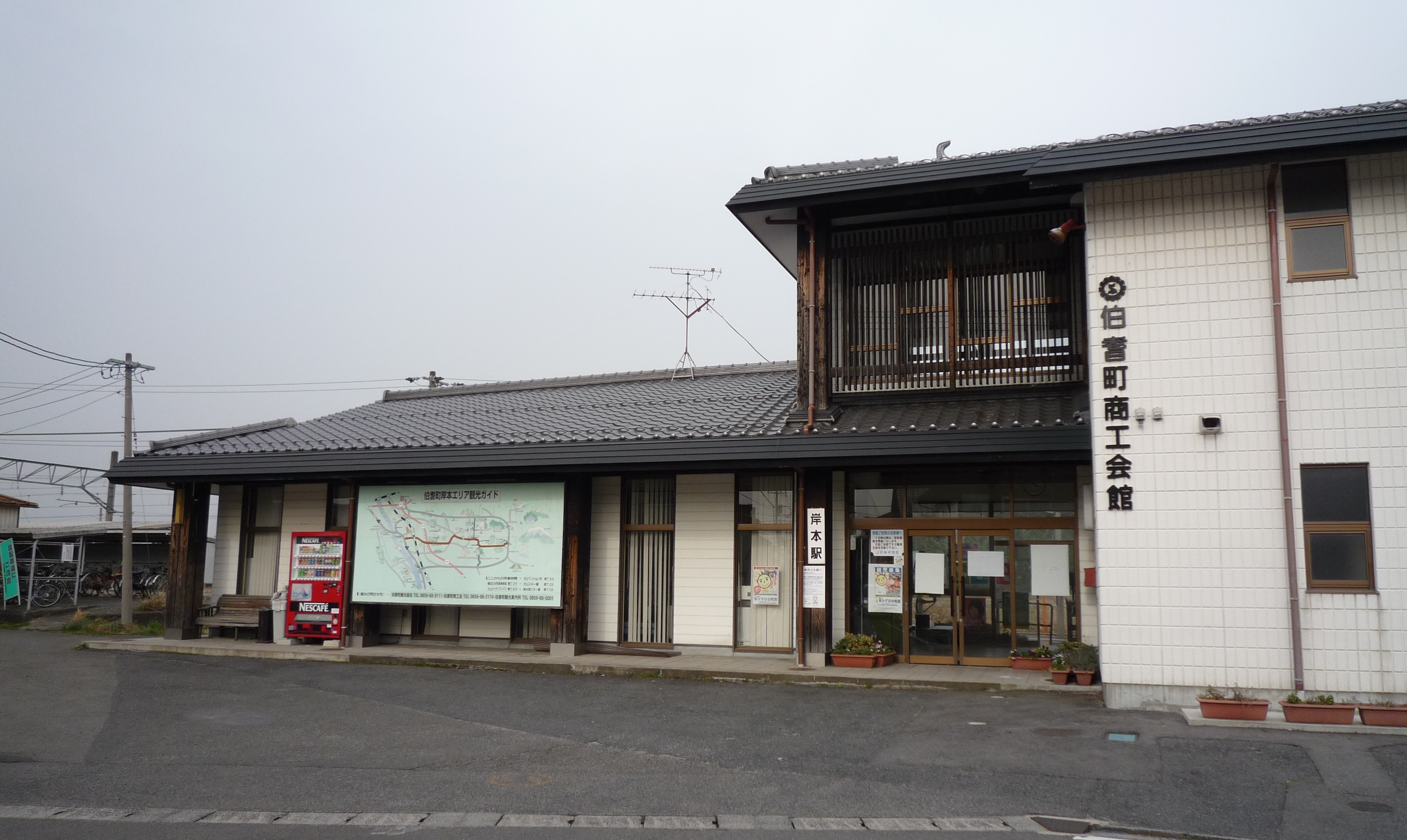
- Kishimoto Station, March 2009

General information
- Location: Yoshinaga, Hōki-chō, Saihaku-gun, Tottori-ken 689-4133; Japan
- Coordinates: 35°23′13.19″N 133°24′34.87″E
- Operator: JR West
- Line: Hakubi Line
- Distance: 132.3 km (82.2 miles) from Kurashiki
- Platforms: 1 island platform
- Tracks: 2

Construction
- Structure type: At grade

Other information
- Status: Unstaffed
- Website: Official website

History
- Opened: 10 August 1919

Passengers
- 2018: 216 daily
Location
- Location within Tottori Prefecture Location within Japan

Kishimoto Station (岸本駅, Kishimoto-eki) is a passenger railway station located in the town of Hōki, Tottori Prefecture, Japan. It is operated by the West Japan Railway Company (JR West).

== Lines ==
Kishimoto Station is served by the Hakubi Line, and is located 132.3 kilometers from the terminus of the line at Kurashiki and 148.2 kilometers from Okayama.

== Station layout ==
The station consists of one ground-level island platform connected with the station building by a level crossing. The station building is a multi-purpose facility and also contains the Hōki Chamber of Commerce and Industry.

=== Platforms ===
1	■ Hakubi Line	for Niimi and Okayama for Yonago
2	■ Hakubi Line	siding to permit passage of express trains

== Adjacent stations ==
«	Service	»
Hakubi Line
Hōki-Mizoguchi	-	Hōki-Daisen

== History ==
Kishimoto Station opened on August 10, 1919. With the privatization of the Japan National Railways (JNR) on April 1, 1987, the station came under the aegis of the West Japan Railway Company.

== Passenger statistics ==
In fiscal 2018, the station was used by an average of 216 passengers daily.

== Surrounding area ==
- Hōki Town Office
- Shoji Ueda Museum of Photography
- Hōki Municipal Kishimoto Junior High School
- Hōki Municipal Kishimoto Elementary School

== See also ==
- List of railway stations in Japan
