= Kotoura, Tottori =

Kotoura 琴浦町
- Town
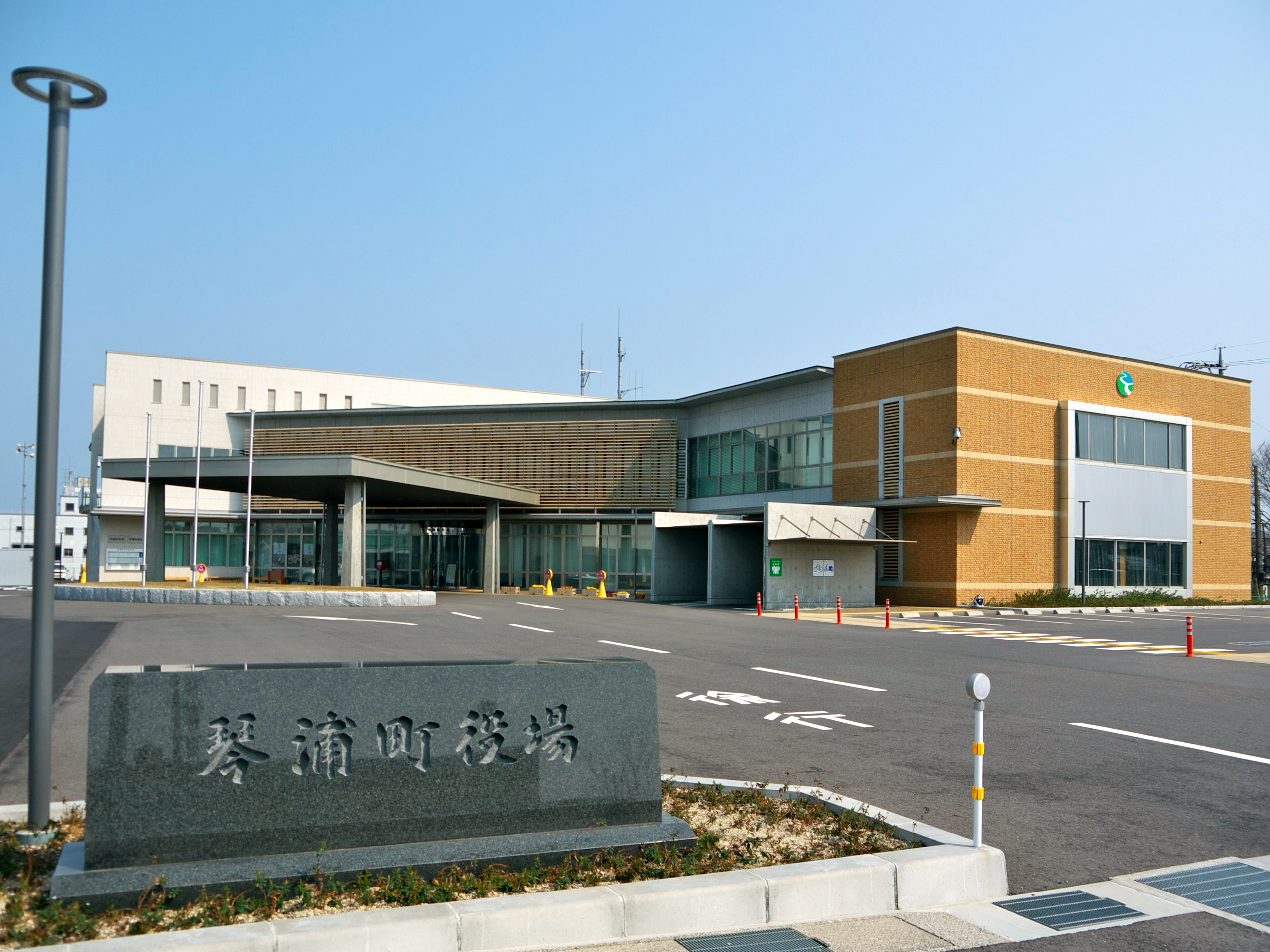
- Kotoura town office

- Flag Emblem
- Interactive map of Kotoura
- Location in Japan
- Coordinates: 35°30′N 133°42′E
- Country: Japan
- Region: Chūgoku; San'in
- Prefecture: Tottori
- District: Tōhaku

Area
  - Total: 139.97 km^{2} (54.04 sq mi)

Population (December 21, 2022)
  - Total: 16,434
  - Density: 117.41/km^{2} (304.09/sq mi)
- Time zone: UTC+09:00 (JST)
- City hall address: 591-2 Tokuman, Kotoura-cho, Tohaku-gun, Tottori-ken 689-2392
- Website: Official website
- Symbols
- Bird: Common kingfisher
- Flower: Cherry blossom
- Tree: Japanese beech

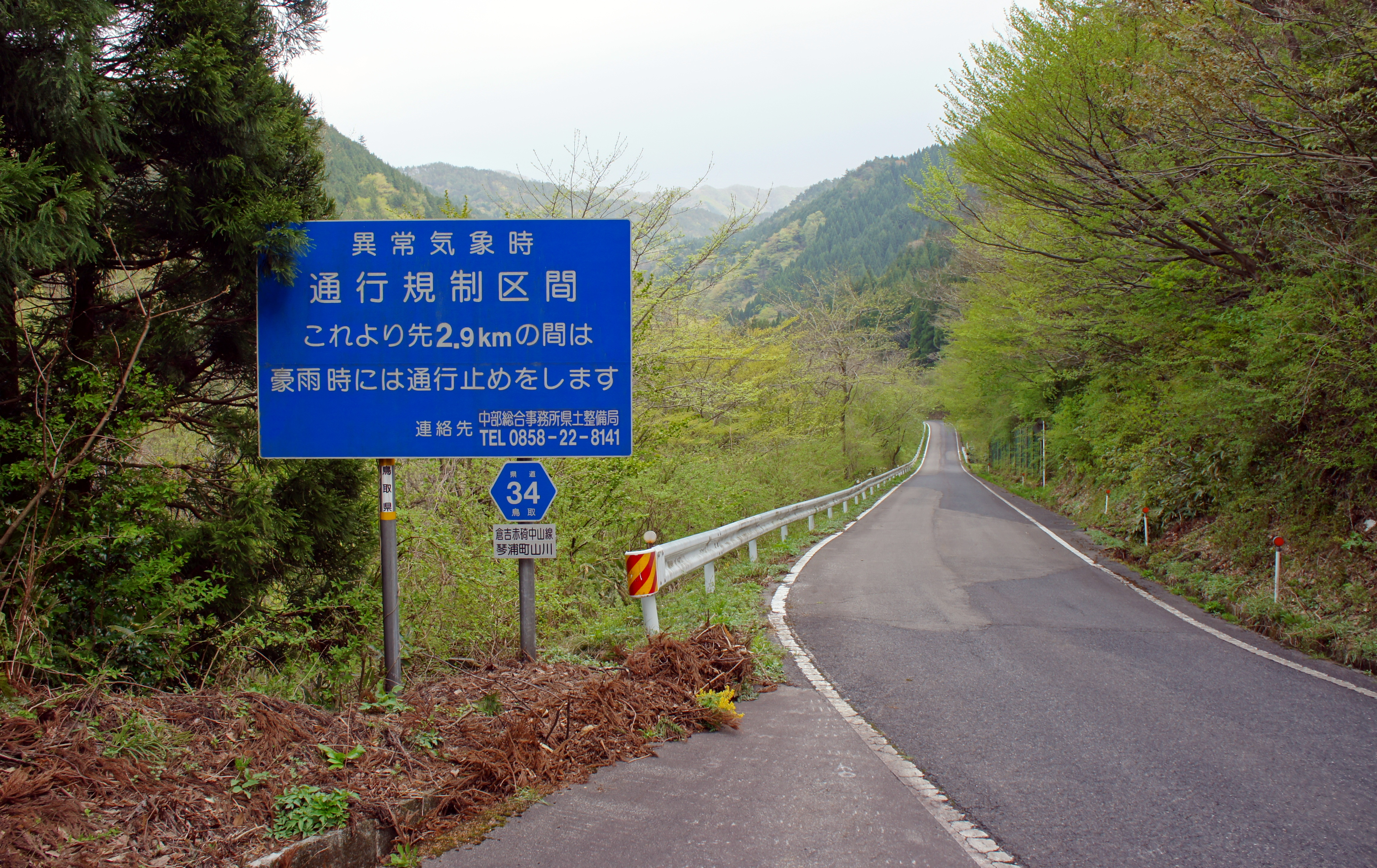
Tottori Prefectural Road 34

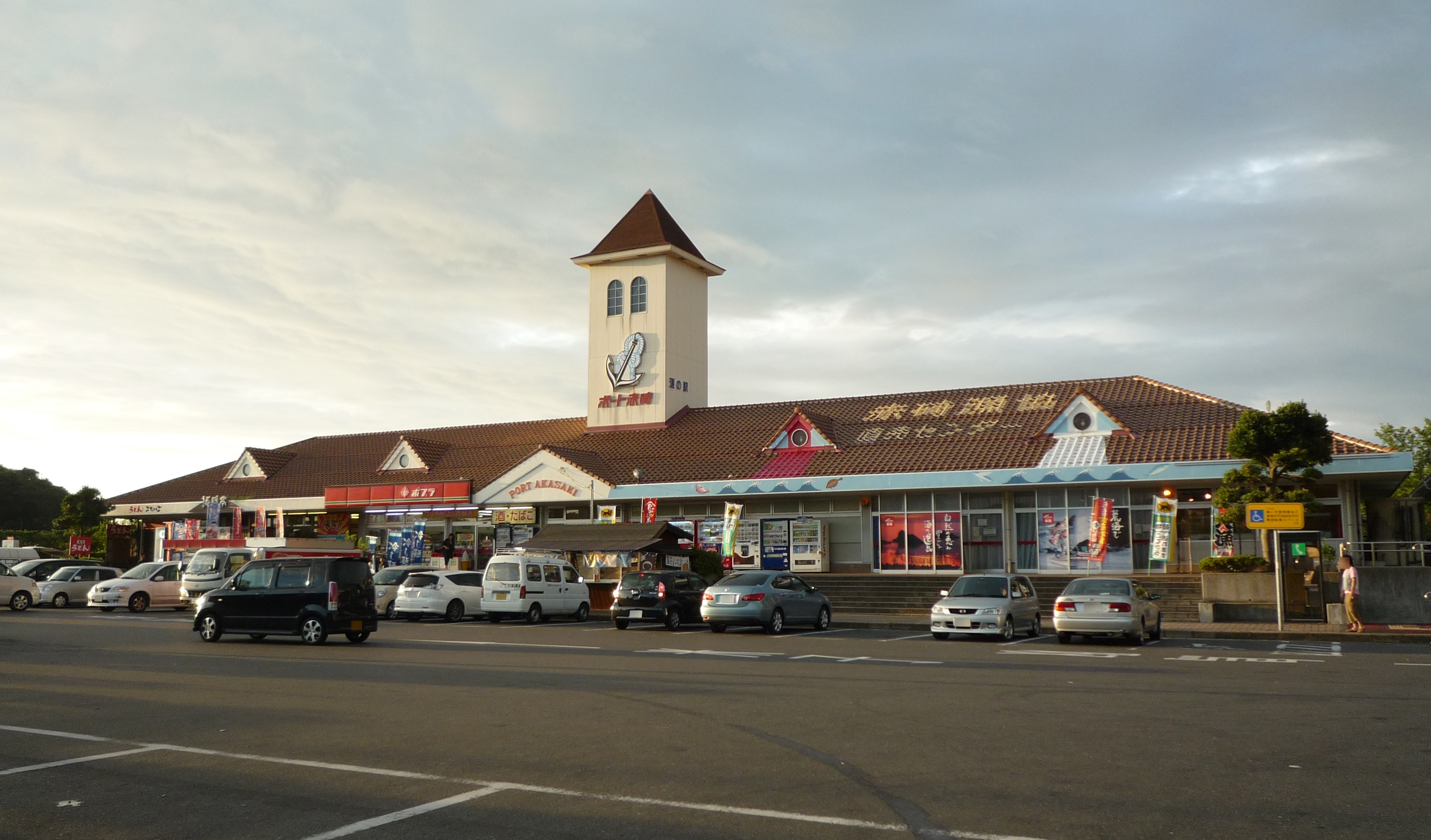
Roadside Station(Michinoeki) Port Akasaki at Kotoura Town

Kotoura (琴浦町, Kotoura-chō) is a town located in Tōhaku District, Tottori Prefecture, Japan. As of 31 December 2022, the town had an estimated population of 16,434 in 6452 households and a population density of 120 persons per km^{2}. The total area of the town is 139.97 square kilometres (54.04 sq mi).

== Etymology ==
The name of Kotoura in Japanese is formed from two kanji. The first, 琴, refers to the traditional Japanese 13-string musical instrument, and the second, 浦 means "cove". The name of the town is taken from a stretch of the coast on the Japan Sea called Koto-no-ura (琴ノ浦).

== Geography ==
Kotoura is located in central Tottori Prefecture, bordered by the Sea of Japan to the north while the southern part of the city rises to the Chūgoku Mountains. Mount Senjō, to the southwest of the town, is within the Mount Daisen range. It is designated as a heavy snowfall area.

=== Neighboring municipalities ===
Tottori Prefecture

- Daisen to the west
- Kōfu to the south
- Hokuei to the east
- Kurayoshi to the southeast

== Climate ==
Kotoura is classified as a humid subtropical climate (Köppen Cfa) characterized by warm summers and cold winters with heavy snowfall. The average annual temperature in Kotoura is 15.2 °C. The average annual rainfall is 2097 mm with September as the wettest month. The temperatures are highest on average in August, at around 26.3 °C, and lowest in January, at around 5.1 °C.

== Demography ==
Per Japanese census data, the population of Kotoura has been as follows. The population has been slowly declining since the 1950s.

Historical population
Year	Pop.	±%
1920	20,250	—
1930	21,933	+8.3%
1940	21,400	−2.4%
1950	21,741	+1.6%
1960	27,173	+25.0%
1970	25,322	−6.8%
1980	22,300	−11.9%
1990	22,150	−0.7%
2000	20,442	−7.7%
2010	18,535	−9.3%

== History ==
Kotoura has been settled since ancient times. A Yayoi period (300 BC–250 AD) dōtaku was unearthed in Yabase district, one of only 400 in Japan, and a bronze sword was unearthed in Tagoshi district, and both items suggest a prosperous settlement in Kotoura in this period. Kotoura was part of ancient Hōki Province, and the ruins of an extensive Asuka period Buddhist temple Sainoo temple ruins is a Special National Historic Site. The diary of Fujiwara no Sanesuke (957–1046), published as the Shōyūki describe rich pastures in the area during the Heian period (794–1185). Kotoura was used after this period as a center for animal husbandry. In the Edo period (1603–1868) a karō of Tottori Domain resided in Kotoura, and the town supported a thriving market in the Urayasu district.

Following the Meiji restoration, the area was organized into villages within Tōhaku District, Tottori Prefecture The town of Kotoura was formed on September 1, 2004, by the merger of the towns of Tōhaku and Akasaki.

== Government ==
Kotoura has a mayor-council form of government with a directly elected mayor and a unicameral town council of eight members. Kotoura, collectively with the other municipalities of Tōhaku District, contributes three members to the Tottori Prefectural Assembly. In terms of national politics, the town is part of Tottori 2nd district of the lower house of the Diet of Japan.

== Economy ==
The economy of Kotoura is based agriculture and food processing, including sake and soy sauce brewing.

== Education ==
Kotoura has four public elementary schools and two public junior high schools operated by the town government. The town does not have high school, but the Tottori Prefectural Board of Education operates a special education school for the handicapped.

== Transportation ==
=== Railway ===
JR West - San'in Line

- Urayasu - Yabase- Akasaki

=== Highway ===
- San'in Expressway
- National Route 9

== Local attractions ==
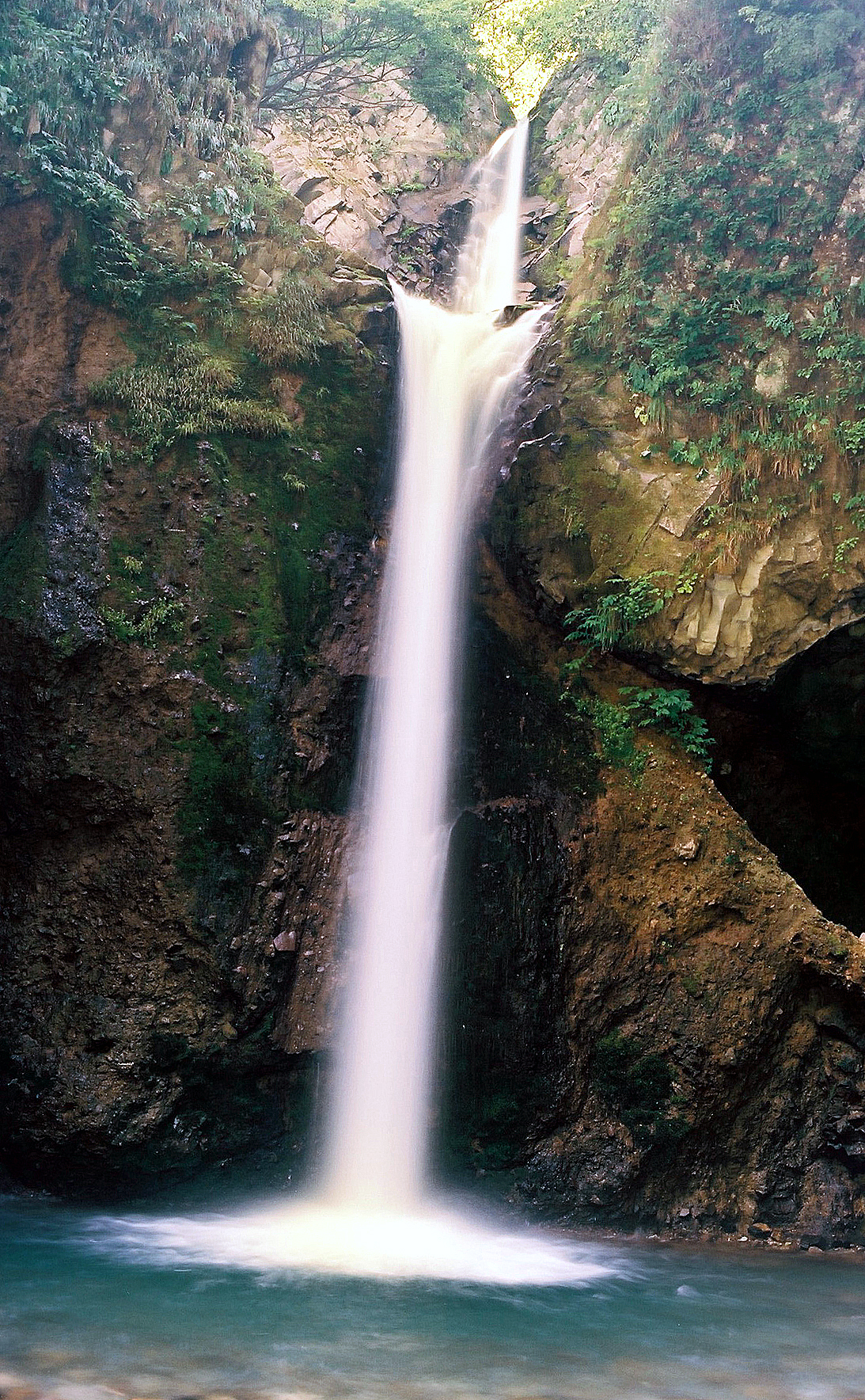
Daisen Waterfall

- Mount Senjō and Mount Senjō Sakura Festival
- Daisen Waterfall
- Sainoo temple ruins, Special National Historic Site
- Yabase Castle ruins
- Kawamoto Family Residence

== Notable people ==
- Tomoyuki Kawabata, cyclist (1985–)
- Yoshihiro Kawakami, politician (1950–)
- Kaori Kawanaka, archer (1991–)
- Shigeru Kobayashi, baseball pitcher (1952–2010)
- Teikō Shiotani, photographer (1899–1988)
