= Yaiba: Samurai Legend =

Japanese manga series and its franchise

- First tankōbon volume cover, featuring Yaiba Kurogane (left) and Sayaka Mine (right)
- Genre: Adventure; Fantasy comedy
- Manga
- Written by: Gosho Aoyama
- Published by: Shogakukan
- English publisher: NA: Viz Media
- Imprint: Shōnen Sunday Comics
- Magazine: Weekly Shōnen Sunday
- Original run: September 7, 1988 – December 1, 1993
- Volumes: 24
- Anime television series

Kenyū Densetsu Yaiba
- Directed by: Kunihiko Yuyama; Norihiko Suto (chief)
- Produced by: Mutsuo Shimizu; Noriko Kobayashi; Toshihiro Nakazawa; Toshiaki Okuno
- Written by: Kenji Terada
- Music by: Kohei Tanaka
- Studio: Pastel
- Original network: TXN (TV Tokyo, TVh)
- Original run: April 9, 1993 – April 1, 1994
- Episodes: 52
- Anime television series
- Directed by: Takahiro Hasui
- Produced by: Takurou Muratsubaki; Tsuyoshi Yoshida; Youko Ueda; Yuuma Takahashi
- Written by: Touko Machida
- Music by: Yutaka Yamada; Yoshiaki Dewa
- Studio: Wit Studio (Note: Animation production assistance (アニメーション制作協力) by Studio Kurm in season 2.)
- Licensed by: NA/AU/NZ: Viz Media
- Original network: NNS (ytv, NTV)
- Original run: April 5, 2025 – present
- Episodes: 24
- icon

Yaiba: Samurai Legend (stylized as Y∀IBA) is a Japanese manga series written and illustrated by Gosho Aoyama. It was serialized in Shogakukan's shōnen manga magazine Weekly Shōnen Sunday from September 1988 to December 1993, with its chapters collected in 24 tankōbon volumes. The manga has been licensed for English release in North America by Viz Media.

The story follows Yaiba Kurogane, a samurai boy raised in the forest by his father who ends up returning to city life in Japan. Yaiba encounters a rival swordsman, Takeshi Onimaru, but when the battle just so happens to end in a stalemate, a humiliated Onimaru is lured into malevolence upon stumbling across a magical katana, culminating in his plans to take over the world with an army of demons. This forces Yaiba and his allies to go on a quest to defeat the newly transformed demon lord, while also encountering several figures from Japanese history and mythology along the way.

A 52-episode anime television series adaptation, titled Kenyū Densetsu Yaiba, produced by Pastel, aired on TV Tokyo and Television Hokkaido from April 1993 to April 1994. A second anime television series adaptation, produced by Wit Studio, aired its first season from April to September 2025. A second season is set to premiere in January 2027. The second anime series has been licensed in English by Viz Media.

By May 2024, the manga had over 17 million copies in circulation. In 1993, Yaiba received the 38th Shogakukan Manga Award for the shōnen category.

== Story ==
Yaiba Kurogane is an adventurous boy who knows how to be a samurai but not much else. He lives with his father, Kenjuro, in the forest. One day, while Yaiba was eating, a troop of gorillas comes to attack. Yaiba and his father escape and hide inside a box. They do not know, however, that the box is full of pineapples and is going to be transported to the city. Once there, Yaiba discovers that he is a legendary warrior who must fight a demonic-looking high school student named Takeshi Onimaru.

The people Yaiba meets on his journey help him grow as a samurai through training and guidance. Despite his skill with a sword, Yaiba is impulsive and often creates conflicts with potential allies, necessitating the intervention of his friends. Together, they embark on various adventures and encounter figures from Japanese history and mythology. Their journey eventually leads them to confront a threat that endangers the entire world.

== Production ==
Gosho Aoyama modeled the character of Yaiba after the protagonist of Ore wa Teppei, which also inspired the author to take up kendo, although he noted Teppei to be a lot smarter than Yaiba.

== Media ==
=== Manga ===
Written and illustrated by Gosho Aoyama, Yaiba was serialized in Shogakukan's shōnen manga magazine Weekly Shōnen Sunday from September 7, 1988, to December 1, 1993. Shogakukan collected its chapters in 24 tankōbon volumes, released between April 18, 1989, and February 18, 1994. Shogakukan republished the series in a 10-volume bunkoban edition from December 14, 2001, to August 10, 2002. Shogakukan released a second 24-volume edition from July 15, 2004, to April 18, 2005.

In October 2024, Viz Media announced at New York Comic Con that it has licensed the manga for English release in North America, with the first volume released in July 2025.

==== Volumes ====
No.	Release date	ISBN
1	April 18, 1989	4-09-122271-4
2	June 17, 1989	4-09-122272-2
3	August 18, 1989	4-09-122273-0
4	October 18, 1989	4-09-122274-9
5	December 14, 1989	4-09-122275-7
6	March 17, 1990	4-09-122276-5
7	May 18, 1990	4-09-122277-3
8	July 18, 1990	4-09-122278-1
9	October 18, 1990	4-09-122279-X
10	February 18, 1991	4-09-122280-3
11	May 18, 1991	4-09-122561-6
12	July 18, 1991	4-09-122562-4
13	September 18, 1991	4-09-122563-2
14	November 18, 1991	4-09-122564-0
15	January 18, 1992	4-09-122565-9
16	April 17, 1992	4-09-122566-7
17	June 18, 1992	4-09-122567-5
18	August 10, 1992	4-09-122568-3
19	November 18, 1992	4-09-122569-1
20	February 18, 1993	4-09-122570-5
21	May 18, 1993	4-09-123231-0
22	July 17, 1993	4-09-123232-9
23	October 18, 1993	4-09-123233-7
24	February 18, 1994	4-09-123234-5

===== Bunkoban edition =====
No.	Original release date	Original ISBN	English release date	English ISBN
1	December 14, 2001	4-09-193371-8	July 8, 2025	978-1-9747-5604-9
2	December 14, 2001	4-09-193372-6	October 14, 2025	978-1-9747-5876-0
3	February 15, 2002	4-09-193373-4	January 13, 2026	978-1-9747-6103-6
4	February 15, 2002	4-09-193374-2	April 14, 2026	978-1-9747-6275-0
5	April 16, 2002	4-09-193375-0	July 14, 2026	978-1-9747-6456-3
6	April 16, 2002	4-09-193376-9	October 13, 2026	978-1-9747-6536-2
7	June 15, 2002	4-09-193377-7	January 12, 2027	978-1-9747-6637-6
8	June 15, 2002	4-09-193378-5	—	—
9	August 10, 2002	4-09-193379-3	—	—
10	August 10, 2002	4-09-193380-7	—	—

=== Anime ===
==== 1993 series ====
An 52-episode anime television series, titled Kenyū Densetsu Yaiba (剣勇伝説YAIBA; lit. 'Brave Sword Legend Yaiba'), produced by Pastel, aired on TV Tokyo from April 9, 1993, to April 1, 1994. The opening theme song is "Yuuki ga Areba" (勇気があれば; lit. 'If You Have Courage'), while the ending theme songs is "Shinjigakunaki Tatakai" (神智学無き戦い; lit. 'Battle Without Theosophy'), both performed by Kabuki Rocks.

===== Episodes =====
No.	Title	Directed by (Note: Production staff information is taken from the ending credits of each episode.)	Written by	Storyboard by	Original release date
1	"Heisei's Samurai Yaiba Appears!"; Transliteration: "Heisei no Samurai Yaiba Tōjō!" (Japanese: 平成の侍ヤイバ登場!)	Yoshimi Katsumata	Kenji Terada	Kunihiko Yuyama	April 9, 1993
2	"The Awakening of the Sword of Fuujin!"; Transliteration: "Yomigaeru Fūjin no Ken!" (Japanese: よみがえる風神の剣!)	Norihiko Sudo	Kenji Terada	Norihiko Sudo	April 16, 1993
3	"Sword of Raijin/Sword of Fuujin"; Transliteration: "Raijin no Ken/Fūjin no Ken" (Japanese: 雷神の剣/風神の剣)	Mihiro Yamaguchi	Kenji Terada	Yoshihiro Yamano	April 23, 1993
4	"The Eight Demons: Frog Man's Assault"; Transliteration: "Hakki Kaeru Otoko no Shūgeki" (Japanese: 八鬼・カエル男の襲撃)	Takuo Suzuki	Kenji Terada	Takuo Suzuki	April 30, 1993
5	"Special Attack Senpuu Ken!!"; Transliteration: "Hissatsu Waza Senpū Ken!!" (Japanese: 必殺技せんぷう剣!!)	Yusuke Yamamoto	Yukiyoshi Ohashi	Yorifusa Yamaguchi	May 7, 1993
6	"Frightening Slug Man Appears"; Transliteration: "Kyōfu no Namekuji Otoko Sanjō" (Japanese: 恐怖のナメクジ男参上)	Akitaro Daichi	Yukiyoshi Ohashi	Akitaro Daichi	May 14, 1993
7	"The Eight Demons: Spider Man's Weakness!?"; Transliteration: "Hakki Kumo Otoko no Jakuten!?" (Japanese: 八鬼・クモ男の弱点!?)	Yasuhiro Matsumura	Kenji Terada	Yasuhiro Matsumura	May 21, 1993
8	"Vampire: Bat Guy!"; Transliteration: "Kyūketsuki. Battogai!" (Japanese: 吸血鬼・バットガイ!)	Hiroshi Yoshida	Yukiyoshi Ohashi	Hiroshi Yoshida	May 28, 1993
9	"The Secret of the Onimaru Manjuu"; Transliteration: "Onimaru Manjū no Himitsu" (Japanese: 鬼丸まんじゅうの秘密)	Osamu Sekita	Isao Shizuya	Osamu Sekita	June 4, 1993
10	"The Revival of the Master Swordsman, Kojiro"; Transliteration: "Tensai Kenshi Kojirō Fukkatsu" (Japanese: 天才剣士小次郎復活!)	Naohito Takahashi	Yukiyoshi Ohashi	Naohito Takahashi	June 11, 1993
11	"Who Is the Strongest Swordsman?!"; Transliteration: "Kengō Nipponichi wa Dare Da!!" (Japanese: 剣豪日本一はだれだ!!)	Jōhei Matsuura	Kenji Terada	Jōhei Matsuura	June 18, 1993
12	"The Birth of the Kaminari Giri!"; Transliteration: "Higi Kaminari-Giri Tanjō!" (Japanese: 秘技カミナリ斬り誕生!)	Shunji Yoshida	Kenji Terada	Mihiro Yamaguchi	June 25, 1993
13	"Gigantic Anglerfish! Sneak into Onimaru Castle"; Transliteration: "Kyodai Ankō!? Onimaru Jō Sennyū" (Japanese: 巨大アンコウ!?鬼丸城潜入)	Kazunari Kume	Isao Shizuya	Tetsu Kimura	July 2, 1993
14	"Vanished, the Enemy Chameleon!"; Transliteration: "Kieta? Kyōteki Kamereon!" (Japanese: 消えた?強敵カメレオン!)	Yusuke Yamamoto	Yukiyoshi Ohashi	Yusuke Yamamoto	July 9, 1993
15	"Kojiro's Betrayal!?"; Transliteration: "Kojirō ga Uragitta!?" (Japanese: 小次郎が裏切った!?)	Akitaro Daichi	Kenji Terada	Akitaro Daichi	July 16, 1993
16	"The Strongest Machine of the Four Guardians Attacks!"; Transliteration: "Shitennō Saikyō Mashin Shūgeki!" (Japanese: 四天王最強マシン襲撃!)	Yasuhiro Matsumura	Kenji Terada	Yasuhiro Matsumura	July 23, 1993
17	"Wind and Thunder Clash! Yaiba vs. Onimaru"; Transliteration: "Fū-Rai Gekitotsu!! Yaiba bāsasu Onimaru" (Japanese: 風雷激突!!ヤイバ対鬼丸)	Jōhei Matsuura	Isao Shizuya	Jōhei Matsuura	July 30, 1993
18	"Searching for the Legendary Orb!"; Transliteration: "Densetsu no Tama wo Sagase!" (Japanese: 伝説の玉をさがせっ!)	Kazuya Murata	Yukiyoshi Ohashi	Shinichirō Watanabe	August 6, 1993
19	"What Kind of an Orb is the Golden Orb?"; Transliteration: "Kin no Tama wa Nanno Tama?" (Japanese: 金の玉は何の玉?)	Hiroshi Yoshida	Yukiyoshi Ohashi	Hiroshi Yoshida	August 13, 1993
20	"Legend of the Red Dragon!! Amakusa Shirou Appears!"; Transliteration: "Sekiryū Densetsu!! Amakusa Shirō Arawaru!" (Japanese: 赤龍伝説!!天草四郎現わる!!)	Yasuhiro Matsumura	Kenji Terada	Yasuhiro Matsumura	August 20, 1993
21	"Feverish Hell! Steal the Flame Orb!!"; Transliteration: "Netsu Jigoku! Kaen no Tama wo Ubae!!" (Japanese: 熱地獄!火炎の玉を奪え!!)	Mihiro Yamaguchi	Kenji Terada	Mihiro Yamaguchi	August 27, 1993
22	"The World Renowned Thief, Goemon"; Transliteration: "Tenka no O-Dorobō Goemon" (Japanese: 天下の大泥棒・ゴエモン)	Akitaro Daichi	Isao Shizuya	Akitaro Daichi	September 3, 1993
23	"Huge Battle! Buddha vs. Osaka Onimaru Castle"; Transliteration: "Kyodai Kessen! Daibutsu bāsasu Oosaka Onimaru Jō" (Japanese: 巨大決戦!大仏VS大阪鬼丸城)	Kazuya Murata	Yukiyoshi Ohashi	Kazuya Murata	September 10, 1993
24	"Friend or Foe? The Revival of Jubei Yagyu!"; Transliteration: "Teki ka Mikata ka? Yagyū Jūbee Fukkatsu!" (Japanese: 敵か味方か?柳生十兵衛復活!)	Naoyoshi Kusaka	Kenji Terada	Kunihiko Yuyama	September 17, 1993
25	"The Waiting Trap!? The Decisive Battle of Kawanakajima"; Transliteration: "Machi Ukeru Wana!? Kawanakajima Kessen no Maki" (Japanese: 待ちうける罠!?川中島決戦)	Naoyoshi Kusaka	Kenji Terada	Kunihiko Yuyama	September 24, 1993
26	"The Darkness Orb is the Entrance to the Dark World"; Transliteration: "Yami no Tama wa Ankoku Sekai e no Iriguchi" (Japanese: 闇の玉は暗黒世界への入口)	Kazuya Murata	Kenji Terada	Norihiko Sudo	October 1, 1993
27	"Throw Away Your Dream! Special Training Deadly Sword"; Transliteration: "Yume wo Suteru ka! Tokkun Hissatsu Ken" (Japanese: 夢をすてるか!特訓必殺剣)	Naoyoshi Kusaka	Kenji Terada	Masashi Hirota	October 8, 1993
28	"Fast Ball Match! Strike Out Benkei"; Transliteration: "Gōkyū Shōbu! Benkei wo Uchitore" (Japanese: 剛球勝負!弁慶を打ちとれ)	Takao Kato	Kenji Terada	Takao Kato	October 15, 1993
29	"What!? 100,000 Legendary Orbs?"; Transliteration: "Nanii! Densetsu no Tama ga 10 Man ko?" (Japanese: なにっ!伝説の玉が10万個?)	Yasuhiro Matsumura	Kenji Terada	Yasuhiro Matsumura	October 22, 1993
30	"Stinger of Petrification! Monkey Basho"; Transliteration: "Seki ka no Dokubari! Monkii Bashō" (Japanese: 石化の毒針!モンキー芭蕉)	Yoshimi Katsumata	Isao Shizuya	Tetsuya Endō	October 29, 1993
31	"Aim for the Ryuujin Orb on Mount Fuji!"; Transliteration: "Mezase! Fujisan Ryūjin no Tama!" (Japanese: 目指せ!富士山龍神の玉!)	Yūji Mutō	Isao Shizuya	Akitaro Daichi	November 5, 1993
32	"Yaiba Loses the Seven Orbs!?"; Transliteration: "Yaiba Nanatsu no Tama wo Ushinau!?" (Japanese: ヤイバ7つの玉を失う!?)	Masashi Abe	Kenji Terada	Norihiko Sudo	November 12, 1993
33	"Ryuujin's Ruthless Test"; Transliteration: "Hijō Naru Ryūjin no Shiren!" (Japanese: 非情なる龍神の試練!)	Hiroshi Matsuzono	Kenji Terada	Katsumi Endō	November 19, 1993
34	"Disappearing Companions"; Transliteration: "Kiete Iku Nakama-Tachi" (Japanese: 消えていく仲間達)	Kazuya Murata	Kenji Terada	Kazuya Murata	November 26, 1993
35	"The Strongest in History! The Ryuujin Sword!!"; Transliteration: "Shijō Saikyō! Ryūjin Ken!!" (Japanese: 史上最強!龍神剣!!)	Yasuhiro Matsumura	Kenji Terada	Yasuhiro Matsumura	December 3, 1993
36	"Invaders From the Moon - The Empress Kaguya"; Transliteration: "Tsuki Kara no Shinryaku Sha. Jotei Kaguya" (Japanese: 月からの侵略者・女帝かぐや)	Minoru Senboku	Kenji Terada	Minoru Senboku	December 10, 1993
37	"Large Sinking! Onimaru's Floating Castle"; Transliteration: "Dai Gekichin! Onimaru Fuyū Jō!" (Japanese: 大撃沈!鬼丸浮遊城!)	Masashi Abe	Isao Shizuya	Takao Kato	December 17, 1993
38	"Tokyo Flooding Strategy!"; Transliteration: "Tōkyō Mizuzeme Dai Sakusen!!" (Japanese: 東京水攻め作戦!!)	Yoshikata Nitta	Isao Shizuya	Yoshikata Nitta	December 24, 1993
39	"The Moon Alien Merged with the Gas Tank!?"; Transliteration: "Gessei Jin, Gasu Tanku to Gattai!?" (Japanese: 月星人、ガスタンクと合体!?)	Mihiro Yamaguchi	Kenji Terada	Mihiro Yamaguchi	December 27, 1993
40	"Birth of the New Ryuujin Legend!!"; Transliteration: "Shin Ryūjin Densetsu Tanjō!!" (Japanese: 新龍神伝説誕生!!)	Norihiko Sudo	Kenji Terada	Norihiko Sudo	January 7, 1994
41	"Carry Out the Women Rescue Mission"; Transliteration: "Onago Kyūshutsu Sakusen Kekkō!" (Japanese: おなご救出作戦決行!)	Kazuya Murata	Yukiyoshi Ohashi	Norihiko Sudo	January 14, 1994
42	"Jubei Loses His Body!?"; Transliteration: "Karada wo Ubawareta Jūbee!?" (Japanese: 体を奪われた十兵衛!?)	Tetsuya Endō	Isao Shizuya	Tetsuya Endō	January 21, 1994
43	"Sayaka's In Trouble! Hurry, Yaiba!"; Transliteration: "Sayaka Pinchi! Isoge Yaiba" (Japanese: さやかピンチ!急げヤイバ)	Masashi Abe	Kenji Terada	Masamitsu Hidaka	January 28, 1994
44	"The Targeted Dragon Priestess - Sayaka"; Transliteration: "Nerawareta Ryū no Miko. Sayaka" (Japanese: 狙われた龍の巫女・さやか)	Yasuhiro Matsumura	Kenji Terada	Yasuhiro Matsumura	February 4, 1994
45	"Gekko's Return! The Demon King's Sword"; Transliteration: "Gekkō no Gyakushū! Maō Ken" (Japanese: ゲッコーの逆襲!魔王剣)	Akitaro Daichi	Yukiyoshi Ohashi	Akitaro Daichi	February 11, 1994
46	"Yaiba, Defeated By the Demon King's Sword"; Transliteration: "Yaiba, Maō Ken ni Yabureru!" (Japanese: ヤイバ、魔王剣に敗れる!)	Mihiro Yamaguchi	Isao Shizuya	Yoshihiro Yamano	February 18, 1994
47	"Onimaru Returns! Save Sayaka!!"; Transliteration: "Onimaru Fukkatsu! Sayaka wo Sukue!!" (Japanese: 鬼丸復活!さやかを救え!!)	Tetsuya Endō	Kenji Terada	Tetsuya Endō	February 25, 1994
48	"Take That! Combined Technique Wave of Wind Thunder"; Transliteration: "Kurae! Gattai Waza Fū-Rai ha" (Japanese: くらえっ!合体技風雷波)	Hidekazu Sato	Kenji Terada	Yasuhiro Matsumura	March 4, 1994
49	"The Terrible True Figure of Kaguya!"; Transliteration: "Kaguya, Osoroshiki Shin no Sugata!" (Japanese: かぐや、恐ろしき真の姿!)	Akitaro Daichi	Kenji Terada	Akitaro Daichi	March 11, 1994
50	"Desperate Situation! Yaiba Loses His Sword"; Transliteration: "Zettaizetsumei! Yaiba Ken wo Ushinau" (Japanese: 絶体絶命!ヤイバ剣を失う)	Tetsuya Endō	Kenji Terada	Tetsuya Endō	March 18, 1994
51	"The White Ryuujin Appears!!"; Transliteration: "Shiroki Ryūjin Arawaru!!" (Japanese: 白き龍神あらわる!!)	Yasuhiro Matsumura	Kenji Terada	Yasuhiro Matsumura	March 25, 1994
52	"I'm Yaiba Kurogane, a Samurai!"; Transliteration: "Kurogane Yaiba, Samurai da!" (Japanese: 鉄ヤイバ、サムライだ!)	Norihiko Sudo	Kenji Terada	Norihiko Sudo	April 1, 1994

==== 2025 series ====
A second anime adaptation, with supervision from Aoyama, was announced in Weekly Shōnen Sunday on May 8, 2024. Titled Yaiba: Samurai Legend (真・侍伝YAIBA, Shin Samurai-den Yaiba; lit. 'True Samurai Legend Yaiba'), it is produced by Wit Studio and directed by Takahiro Hasui, with series composition by Touko Machida, Yoshimichi Kameda designing the characters and serving as chief animation director, Maiko Okada serving as animation producer, and Yutaka Yamada and Yoshiaki Dewa composing the music. Minami Takayama reprised her role as the voice of Yaiba Kurogane from the original series.

The series's first season aired for 24 episodes from April 5 to September 27, 2025, on all NNS affiliate stations, including Yomiuri TV and Nippon TV, airing in tandem with Aoyama's other anime series adaptation, Case Closed, as part of the "Gosho Aoyama Hour" block, with the first three episodes having had early screenings at ten Toho Cinemas locations on March 13. For the first cours, the opening theme song is "Blade", performed by Blue Encount, while the ending theme song is "Pineapple Tart", performed by Otoha. For the second cours, the opening theme song is "Blade Kizuna ver", also performed by Blue Encount, while the ending theme song is "Action!", performed by Kairi Yagi. Aniplex collected its episodes on two Blu-ray sets, released on September 24, 2025, and February 25, 2026.

In September 2025, it was announced that the series will receive a second season, covering the Kaguya story arc. The season is set to premiere on January 9, 2027. For the second season, the opening theme song is "Chase!", performed by Chico with HoneyWorks.

In October 2024, Viz Media announced at New York Comic Con that it licensed the series. The series is streaming on Netflix in North America, Latin America, Australia, and New Zealand, and on Hulu in the United States. Viz Media release the first season on a limited-edition Blu-ray set on October 27, 2026.

===== Episodes =====
====== Season 1 (2025) ======
No.	Title	Directed by	Written by	Storyboard by	Original release date
1	"Meeting Yaiba"; Transliteration: "Yaiba Kenzan" (Japanese: YAIBA見参)	Takahiro Hasui	Touko Machida	Takahiro Hasui	April 5, 2025
2	"Fujinken Reborn"; Transliteration: "Yomigaeru Fūjinken" (Japanese: 蘇る風神剣)	Hiroyuki Tanaka	Touko Machida	Takahiro Hasui & Atsushi Takahashi	April 12, 2025
3	"Another Maken"; Transliteration: "Mō Hitotsu no Maken" (Japanese: もう一つの魔剣)	Yōsuke Hatta	Touko Machida	Yōsuke Hatta	April 19, 2025
4	"Attack of the Eight Ogres"; Transliteration: "Hakki Shugeki no Maki" (Japanese: 八鬼襲撃ノ巻)	Makoto Fuchigami	Eiji Umehara	Makoto Fuchigami	April 26, 2025
5	"Onsen Fun"; Transliteration: "Onsen no Tanoshimi" (Japanese: るんるん温泉旅館ノ巻)	Kazuki Yokoyama	Eiji Umehara	Kazuki Yokoyama	May 3, 2025
6	"The Unexpected Mr. Bat"; Transliteration: "Yosō-gai no Misutā Batto" (Japanese: 予想外のミスター・バット)	Yuji Tokuno	Tomomi Kawaguchi	Yuji Tokuno	May 10, 2025
7	"Kojiro Resurrected"; Transliteration: "Kojirō Fukkatsu no Maki" (Japanese: 小次郎復活ノ巻)	Yoshitane Hosogawa	Touko Machida	Takahiro Hasui & Atsushi Takahashi	May 17, 2025
8	"The Duel at Ganryu Island"; Transliteration: "Ganryūjima Notatakai no Maki" (Japanese: 巌流島の戦いノ巻)	Masao Kawase	Touko Machida	Makoto Fuchigami & Yōsuke Hatta	May 24, 2025
9	"Dawn of the Lightning Slash"; Transliteration: "Kaminari Giri Tanjō" (Japanese: かみなり斬り誕生ノ巻)	Hiroyuki Tanaka	Tomomi Kawaguchi	Hiroaki Shimura	May 31, 2025
10	"Onimaru's Devil Kings"; Transliteration: "Onimaru Shiten-nō Tōjō" (Japanese: 鬼丸四天王登場)	Mitsutoshi Satou & Tomoko Hiramuki	Eiji Umehara	Shinsaku Sasaki	June 7, 2025
11	"Raijinken vs. Fujinken"; Transliteration: "Raijinken bāsasu Fujinken" (Japanese: 雷神剣 VS 風神剣)	Yoshitsugu Hosokawa & Makoto Fuchigami	Eiji Umehara	Yōsuke Hatta	June 14, 2025
12	"Nadeshiko Yamoto is Calling"; Transliteration: "Yamato Nadeshiko ga Yattekita" (Japanese: 大和撫子がやってきた)	Atsuko Nozaki	Tomomi Kawaguchi	Atsuko Nozaki	June 21, 2025
13	"Find the Dragon God Orb"; Transliteration: "Ryūjin no Tama o Sagase" (Japanese: 龍神の玉を探せ)	Hitomi Ezoe	Touko Machida	Atsushi Takahashi & Makoto Fuchigami	June 28, 2025
14	"The Rise of Ninja Kotaro"; Transliteration: "Ninja Kotarō Genru!" (Japanese: 忍者小太郎現る！)	Kazuki Yokoyama	Tomomi Kawaguchi	Kazuki Yokoyama	July 12, 2025
15	"Showdown! Magician vs. Yaiba"; Transliteration: "Taiketsu! Yōjutsushi bāsasu Yaiba" (Japanese: 対決！妖術師VS刃ノ巻)	Hiroyuki Tanaka & Maho Ishikawa	Eiji Umehara	Masahiko Komino	July 19, 2025
16	"A Battle of Giants"; Transliteration: "Kyodai Kessen no Maki" (Japanese: 巨大決戦ノ巻)	Yoshitsugu Hosokawa	Eiji Umehara	Itsuki Tsuchigami	July 26, 2025
17	"The Man of Yagyu Shinkage-ryu"; Transliteration: "Yagyuu Shinkageryū no Otoko no Maki" (Japanese: 柳生新陰流の男ノ巻)	Tomoki Nakagami & Takafumi Hino	Tomomi Kawaguchi	Hiroaki Shimura	August 2, 2025
18	"Crisis on Kawanaka-Jima"; Transliteration: "Kawanakajima Daisen Maki" (Japanese: 川中島大決戦ノ巻)	Maho Ishikawa & Makoto Fuchigami	Touko Machida	Yoshiyuki Kaneko	August 9, 2025
19	"Darkness Orb Escape Training"; Transliteration: "Yami-dama Dasshutsu Tokkun no Maki" (Japanese: 闇玉脱出特訓ノ巻)	Rei Nakahara	Touko Machida	Jun Shinohara	August 16, 2025
20	"The Ruse of Monkey Basho"; Transliteration: "Monki Basho no Sakuryaku no Maki" (Japanese: モンキー芭蕉の策略ノ巻)	Hiroyuki Tanaka	Tomomi Kawaguchi	Kazuki Yokoyama	August 23, 2025
21	"Mystery Atop Mt. Fuji"; Transliteration: "Fuji Sanchō de Matsu no Maki" (Japanese: 富士山頂でまつノ巻)	Jiro Yoshida	Eiji Umehara	Hiro Kaburagi	September 6, 2025
22	"Crossroads of the Soul"; Transliteration: "Kokoro no Kiro no Maki" (Japanese: 心の岐路ノ巻)	Yuji Kanzaki	Tomomi Kawaguchi	Yosuke Hatta	September 13, 2025
23	"The Dragon God Orb Ressurected"; Transliteration: "Yomigaeru! Ryūjin no Tama no Maki" (Japanese: 蘇る！龍神の玉ノ巻)	Hitomi Ezoe, Takahiro Hasui & Yoshitsugu Hosokawa	Eiji Umehara	Tetsuo Yajima	September 20, 2025
24	"The Lunar Invaders"; Transliteration: "Tsuki kara no Shinryaku-sha no Maki" (Japanese: 月からの侵略者ノ巻)	Makoto Fuchigami	Touko Machida	Makoto Fuchigami	September 27, 2025

=== Video games ===
A video game adaptation, titled Kenyū Densetsu Yaiba (剣勇伝説YAIBA; lit. 'Brave Sword Legend Yaiba'), was released for the Super Famicom in Japan on March 25, 1994. Reviewers in Weekly Famicom Tsūshin described the game as an action RPG and found it to be an average game with many enemies continuously showing up. Another Yaiba game under the same title was released for the Game Boy in Japan on the same date.

== Reception ==
By May 2024, the manga had over 17 million copies in circulation. In 1993, Yaiba, along Ghost Sweeper Mikami, received the 38th Shogakukan Manga Award for the shōnen category.

Reviewing the first volume of Viz Media's omnibus edition, Jairus Taylor of Anime News Network awarded the manga a C+, praising its slower pacing compared to the 2025 anime adaptation, which allows for deeper character development. However, Taylor criticized its simplistic plot, dated humor—including sexual harassment gags—and occasionally inconsistent artwork. While acknowledging the anime's visual superiority, Taylor found the manga's charm and classic battle shōnen structure made it a worthwhile companion read. Sheena McNeil of Sequential Tart criticized Yaiba for its dated humor and unlikeable protagonist, comparing it unfavorably to Dragon Ball. She found the main character an "annoying brat" and criticized the abrupt villain transformation and the use of misogynistic humor, particularly towards Sayaka. McNeil also questioned its modern republication for teens, citing an instance of sexual assault played for comedy.
