= Akasaki Station (Tottori) =

Railway station located in Kotoura, Tottori Prefecture, Japan

Akasaki Station 赤碕駅
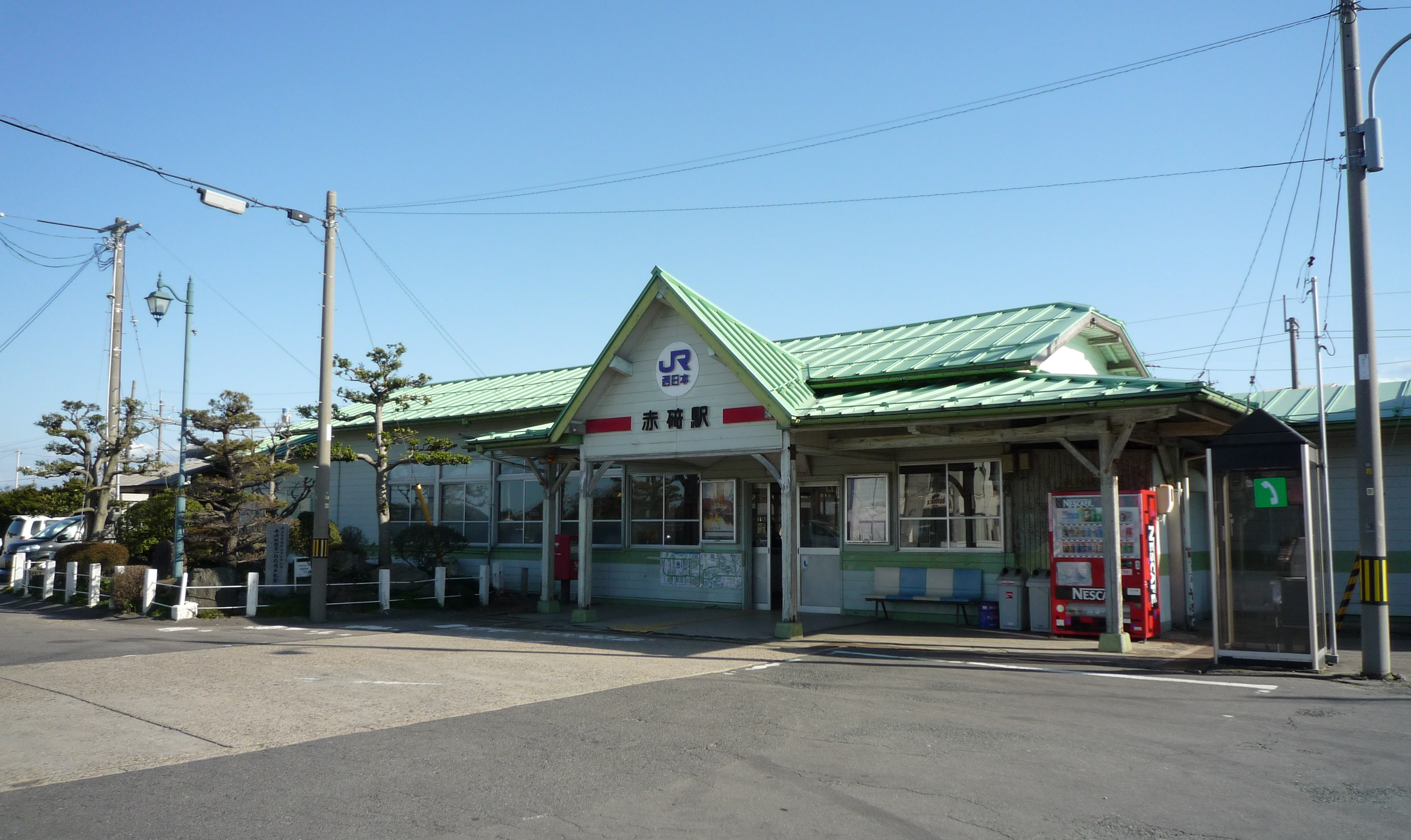
- Akasaki Station, March 2009

General information
- Location: 849-2 Sakanomae, Akasaki, Kotoura-chō, Tōhaku-gun, Tottori-shi 689-2501; Japan
- Coordinates: 35°30′44.43″N 133°38′4.24″E
- Operator: JR West
- Line: San'in Main Line
- Distance: 291.3 km (181.0 miles) from Kyoto
- Platforms: 1 island + 1 side platform
- Tracks: 3

Construction
- Structure type: At grade

Other information
- Status: Unstaffed
- Website: Official website

History
- Opened: 28 August 1903

Passengers
- 2018: 642 daily
Location
- Location within Tottori Prefecture Location within Japan

Akasaki Station (赤碕駅, Akasaki-eki) is a passenger railway station located in the town of Kotoura, Tottori Prefecture, Japan. It is operated by the West Japan Railway Company (JR West).

== Lines ==
Akasaki Station is served by the San'in Main Line, and is located 291.3 kilometers from the terminus of the line at Kyoto.

== Station layout ==
The station consists of one ground-level island platform and one ground level side platform connected by a level crossing to the station building. The station is unattended.

=== Platforms ===
| 1 | ■ San'in Main Line | for Kurayoshi and Tottori for Yonago and Matsue (express) |
| 2 | ■ San'in Main Line | for Yonago and Matsue |
| 3 | ■ San'in Main Line | for Kurayoshi and Tottori for Yonago and Matsue (express) |

== Adjacent stations ==
West Japan Railway Company (JR West)

| « | Service | » |
Sanin Main Line
Limited Express Super Oki: Does not stop at this station
Limited Express Super Matsukaze: Does not stop at this station
| Urayasu | Express "Tottori Liner" (towards Yonago) | Hōki-Daisen |
| Urayasu | Express "Tottori Liner" (towards Tottori) | Daisenguchi |
| Yabase | Local | Nakayamaguchi |

== History ==
Akasaki Station opened on August 28, 1903. With the privatization of the Japan National Railways (JNR) on April 1, 1987, the station came under the aegis of the West Japan Railway Company.

== Passenger statistics ==
In fiscal 2018, the station was used by an average of 642 passengers daily.

== Surrounding area ==
- Kotoura Town Hall Branch Office
- Kotoura Municipal Akasaki Junior High School
- Tottori Prefectural Kotonoura High School for Special Needs Education

== See also ==
- List of railway stations in Japan
