= Hokuei, Tottori =

Hokuei 北栄町
- Town
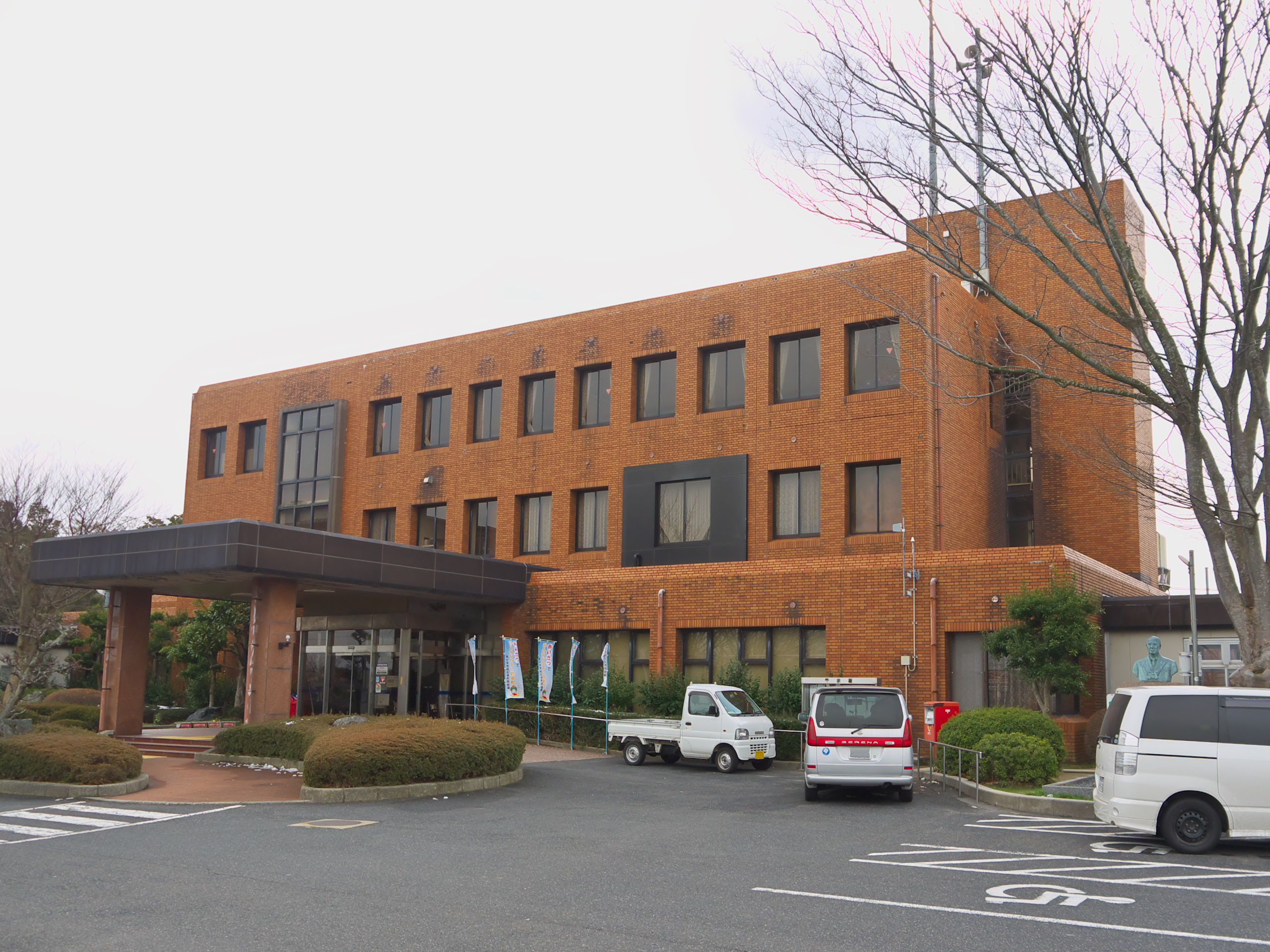
- Hokuei Town Hall

- Flag Emblem
- Interactive map of Hokuei
- Location in Japan
- Coordinates: 35°29′N 133°46′E
- Country: Japan
- Region: Chūgoku; San'in
- Prefecture: Tottori
- District: Tōhaku

Government
  - Mayor: Akio Matsumoto

Area
  - Total: 56.94 km^{2} (21.98 sq mi)

Population (January 1, 2023)
  - Total: 14,508
  - Density: 254.8/km^{2} (659.9/sq mi)
- Time zone: UTC+09:00 (JST)
- City hall address: 423-1 Yurajuku, Hokuei-cho, Tohaku-gun, Tottori-ken 689-2292
- Website: Official website

Hokuei (北栄町, Hokuei-chō) is a town located in Tōhaku District, Tottori Prefecture, Japan. As of 1 January 2023, the town had an estimated population of 14,508 in 5471 households and a population density of 210 persons per km^{2}. The total area of the town is 56.94 square kilometres (21.98 sq mi).

== Geography ==
Hokuei is located in central Tottori Prefecture, bordered by the Sea of Japan to the north. It is designated as a heavy snowfall area. The rivers consist of the Yura River, which flows through the center of the town, and the Tenjin River, which flows through the eastern edge, forming a lowland delta called the Hojo Plain. Hojo sand dunes are located on the coastline.

=== Neighboring municipalities ===
Tottori Prefecture

- Yurihama
- Kurayoshi
- Kotoura

== Climate ==
Hokuei is classified as a humid subtropical climate (Köppen Cfa) characterized by warm summers and cold winters with heavy snowfall. The average annual temperature in Hokuei is 14.1 °C. The average annual rainfall is 2097 mm with September as the wettest month. The temperatures are highest on average in August, at around 25.4 °C, and lowest in January, at around 3.5 °C.

== Demography ==
Per Japanese census data, the population of Hokuei has been as follows.

Historical population
Year	Pop.	±%
1920	13,064	—
1930	14,640	+12.1%
1940	14,171	−3.2%
1950	18,349	+29.5%
1960	16,965	−7.5%
1970	14,491	−14.6%
1980	15,772	+8.8%
1990	17,155	+8.8%
2000	16,916	−1.4%
2010	15,447	−8.7%

== History ==
As with all of Hōki Province, the area was part of the holdings of a branch of the Ikeda clan, daimyō of Tottori Domain under the Edo period Tokugawa shogunate. In 1719, the Ikeda clan developed the a settlement at the mouth of the Yura River as a port and administrative center for collection of taxes. In 1863, this port was fortified with coastal artillery as part of the domain's increased defenses against the possibility of foreign invasion. Following the Meiji restoration, the area was organized into villages within Tōhaku District, Tottori Prefecture on April 1, 1896. Hokuei was created on October 1, 2005, from the merger of the towns of Hōjō and Daiei, both from Tōhaku District.

== Government ==
Hokuei has a mayor-council form of government with a directly elected mayor and a unicameral town council of 15 members. Hokuei, collectively with the other municipalities of Tōhaku District, contributes three members to the Tottori Prefectural Assembly. In terms of national politics, the town is part of Tottori 2nd district of the lower house of the Diet of Japan.

== Economy ==
The economy of Hokuei is based agriculture and commercial fishing. Its main agricultural products are watermelon, nagaimo, tobacco, rakkyō, grapes and wine. The town has nine wind turbines along the coast.

== Education ==
Hokuei has two public elementary schools and two public junior high schools operated by the town government, and one public high school operated by the Tottori Prefectural Board of Education.

== Transportation ==
=== Railway ===
JR West - San'in Line

- Yura - Shimohōjō

=== Highways ===
- National Route 9
- National Route 313

== Sister cities ==
- Dadu District, Taichung, Taiwan, friendship city since July 27, 2010

== Noted people from Hokuei ==
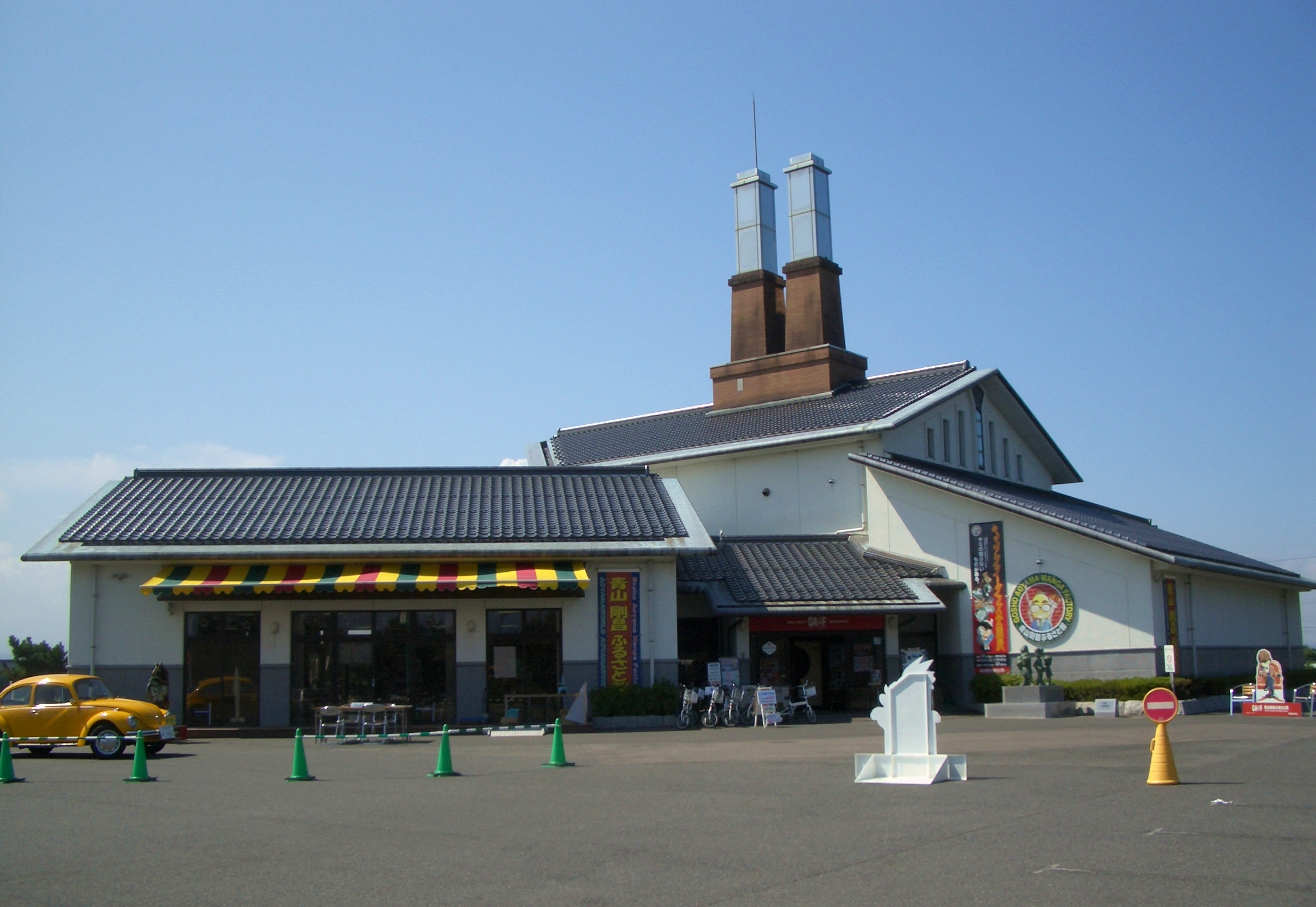
Gosho Aoyama Manga Factory

- Gosho Aoyama - Born in formerly Daiei town. A famous manga artist, creator of the Detective Conan series. In 2007, a museum dedicated to the series, called the Gosho Aoyama Manga Factory, was opened in his home town.

== In popular culture ==
In honor of manga artist Gosho Aoyama, who was born in the former town of Daiei, the town has various tourist attractions related to his most famous work, Detective Conan (known as Case Closed in the United States), including a Detective Conan-themed train station, and is promoted as Conan Town. Tottori Airport, 25 miles away from Hokuei (and located in the town of Koyama, within the city of Tottori, not Hokuei) was renamed Tottori Sand Dunes Conan Airport (鳥取砂丘コナン空港 Tottori Sakyū Konan Kūkō) in 2015. This has caught the attention of American late night talk show host Conan O'Brien, who discussed the town in his talk show and visited in September 2018, during which he became honorary mayor for one day and served hamburgers to the townspeople.
