= Gosho Aoyama =

Japanese manga artist (born 1963)

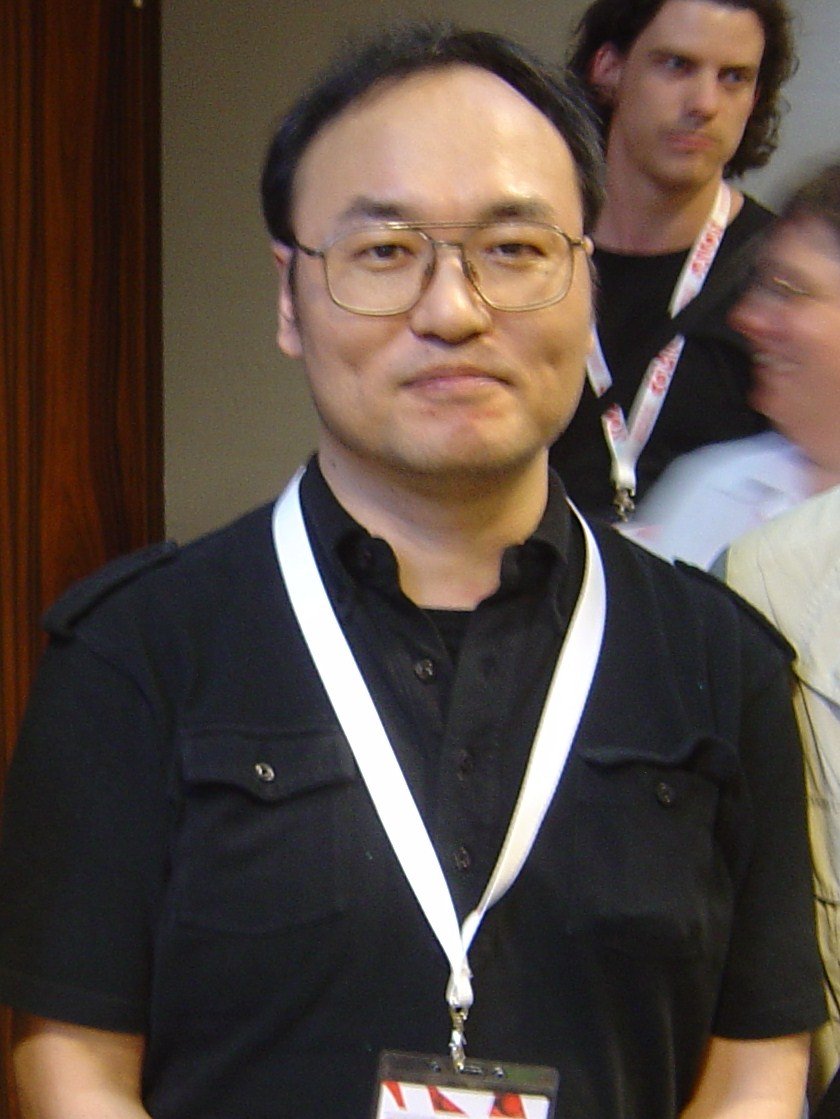
- Aoyama in 2006
- Born: Yoshimasa Aoyama (青山 剛昌, Aoyama Yoshimasa); June 21, 1963 (age 63) Hokuei, Tottori, Japan
- Areas: Manga artist, author
- Pseudonym: Striving Star of Shonen Sunday
- Notable works: Case Closed/Detective Conan; Yaiba; Magic Kaito
- Awards: Shogakukan Manga Award (1993, 2001)
- Spouse: Minami Takayama (m. 2005; div. 2007)

Gosho Aoyama (Japanese: 青山 剛昌, Hepburn: Aoyama Gōshō; born June 21, 1963, real name Yoshimasa Aoyama (Note: The given name in kanji remained the same but reading was changed from kun'yomi to on'yomi.)) is a Japanese manga artist best known for his manga series Case Closed (Detective Conan, 1994–present). As of 2017, his various manga series had a combined 250 million copies in print worldwide. By January 2023, Case Closed alone had over 270 million copies in circulation worldwide.

== Educational background ==
Yoshimasa Aoyama was born in Tottori Prefecture in 1963, to parents Hiromichi and Michiko. He has an older brother who is a scientist and helps him out with the "gimmicks" in Case Closed. He has another brother who is a doctor. Aoyama recalled being fascinated by the Sherlock Holmes story "The Adventure of the Dancing Men" in elementary school. He was talented in drawing from an early age, and eventually quit his school's kendo club to join the art club.

Aoyama graduated from Yuraikuei High School, before going on to study at Nihon University College of Art in Tokyo. In winter of 1986, Aoyama won a comic contest for freshmen students. When he was an art student, Aoyama had a part-time job working at Tokyo Disneyland, where he painted backgrounds for Pirates of the Caribbean.

== Career ==
Aoyama made his professional debut as a manga artist at the age of 23, with Chotto Mattete, which was published in the magazine Weekly Shōnen Sunday in 1987. Shortly after that, he began Magic Kaito in the same magazine.

Between 1988 and 1993, Aoyama created the series Yaiba, which ran for 24 volumes. Later, he would release other manga series in single volumes, such as Yoban Sādo and Aoyama Gōshō Tanpenshū. Aoyama also designed the characters for the "Twilight of Edo Japan" chapter in the 1994 video game Live A Live.

Aoyama began serializing Case Closed in Weekly Shōnen Sunday in January 1994.

== Awards and recognition ==
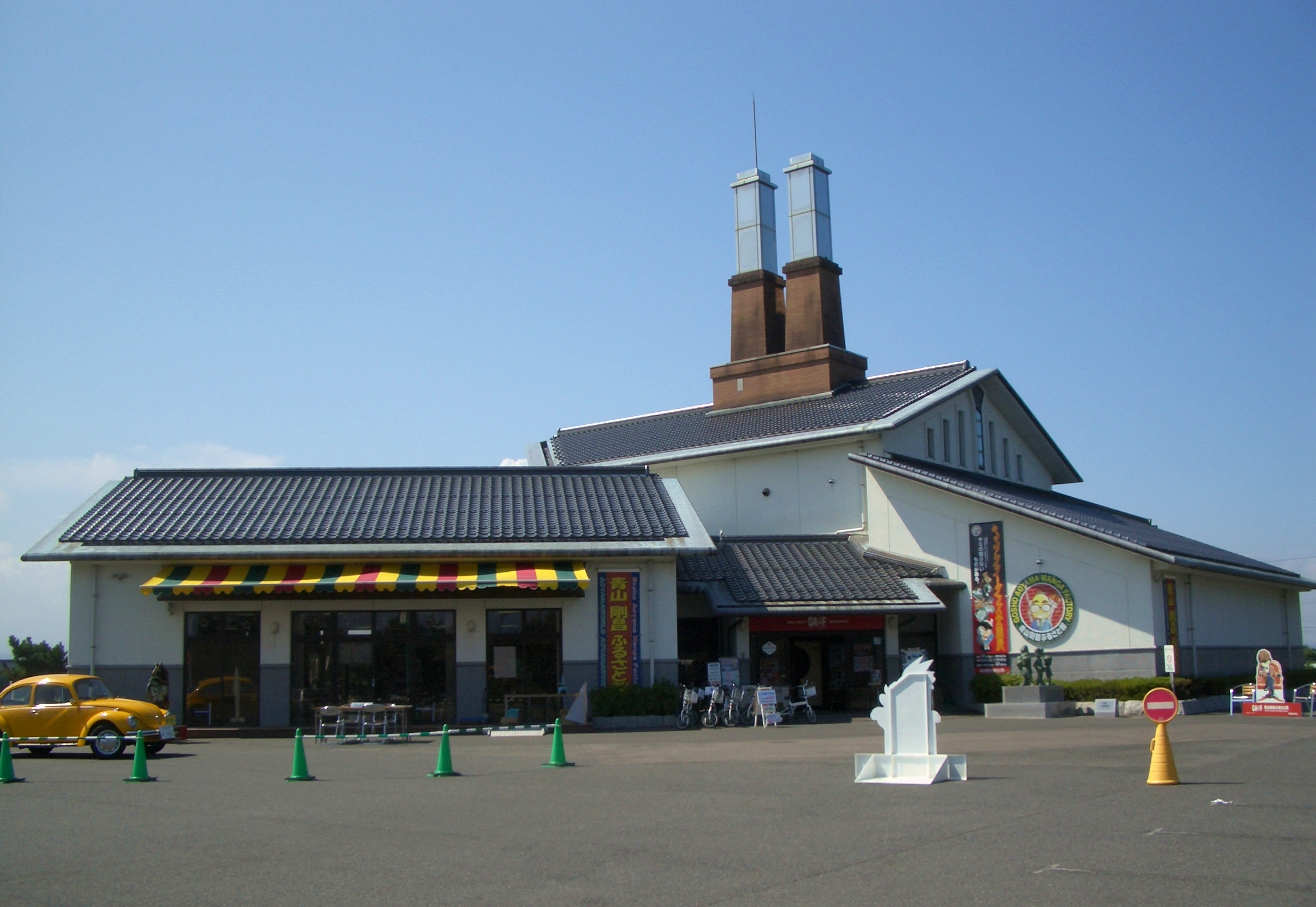
Gosho Aoyama Manga Factory

Aoyama has won two awards for his work as a manga artist. In 1992, he won the Shogakukan Manga Award for shōnen for Yaiba. He would go on to win the same award for a second time in 2001, this time for Case Closed.

Additionally, his hometown Hokuei has undertaken several machi okoshi (town revitalization) projects in honor of his contribution as a manga artist and resident. The first projects were the Conan Bridge across the Yura River and Case Closed statues. On March 18, 2007, the Gosho Aoyama Manga Factory, a museum that celebrates Aoyama's career as a manga artist, was opened.

== Personal life ==
On May 5, 2005, Aoyama married Minami Takayama, the singer of Two-Mix and voice actress for Conan in the anime adaptation of Case Closed. On December 10, 2007, the two divorced. In March 2015, Aoyama was hospitalized for an unspecified surgery, resulting in Case Closed going on its first lengthy hiatus in 21 years.

== Manga works ==
- Chotto Mattete (ちょっとまってて; 'Wait a Minute') (1987)

The story of a boy genius named Yutaka Takai, whose time machine jetpack sends his love interest through time for two years.

- Magic Kaito (まじっく快斗, Majikku Kaito) (1987–present)

A five-volume manga series that tells the adventures of Kaito Kid, a mysterious gentleman thief who uses his skills as illusionist and master of disguise to commit robberies; his secret identity is that of high school student Kaito Kuroba. The first two volumes of the manga series were released in 1988, the third in 1994, the fourth in 2007, and the fifth in 2017; three more chapters were published in 2024. Although the series is currently on hiatus, Kaito Kid still appears regularly in Case Closed.

- Yaiba (1988–1993)

A 24-volume manga series about the adventures of a young samurai named Yaiba Kurogane. It was adapted into a 52-episode anime series which aired between 1993 and 1994.

- Yoban Sādo (4番サード; '3rd Base 4th') (1991–1993)

A one-volume manga that tells the story of a boy named Shigeo Nagashima, a mediocre baseball player on his high school team. One day, he buys a magical bat from a sporting goods store that allows him to hit every pitch. However, he has to pay the mysterious store for each pitch he hits.

- Aoyama Gōshō Tanpenshū (青山剛昌短編集; 'Gosho Aoyama's Collection of Short Stories')

Various short works written over the years:

Play It Again (プレイ イット アゲイン, Purei Itto Agein)
Excalibur (えくすかりばぁ, Ekusukaribā)
Natsu no Santa Claus (夏のサンタクロース; 'Santa Claus in the Summer')
Tantei Jōji no Minimini Daisakusen (探偵ジョージのミニミニ大作戦; 'Detective George's Little Little & Great Operations')
Chotto Mattete
Shōnen Sandē 19(Tō-ku) Show "Samayoeru Akai Chō" (サンデー19show さまよえる赤い蝶; 'Shōnen Sunday 19 (Talk) Show "The Wandering Red Butterfly"')

- Case Closed/Detective Conan (名探偵コナン, Meitantei Konan) (1994–present)

Ongoing series that tells the story of genius high school detective Shinichi Kudo, who one day is turned into a child by mysterious men and assumes the alias of Conan Edogawa. While trying to track down these men, he often encounters complicated mysteries, most of which only he can solve. This series is Aoyama's most well-known creation, and has been collected in 109 volumes as of October 16, 2026.

- ~Watashi ni Uso o Tsuite~ (〜私にウソをついて〜; 'Tell Me a Lie') (2007)

A one-shot about a girl named Terumi Arai (新井輝海, Arai Terumi), who can read people's minds when she looks them in the eyes.
