= Urayasu Station (Tottori) =

Railway station located in Kotoura, Tottori Prefecture, Japan

Urayasu Station 浦安駅
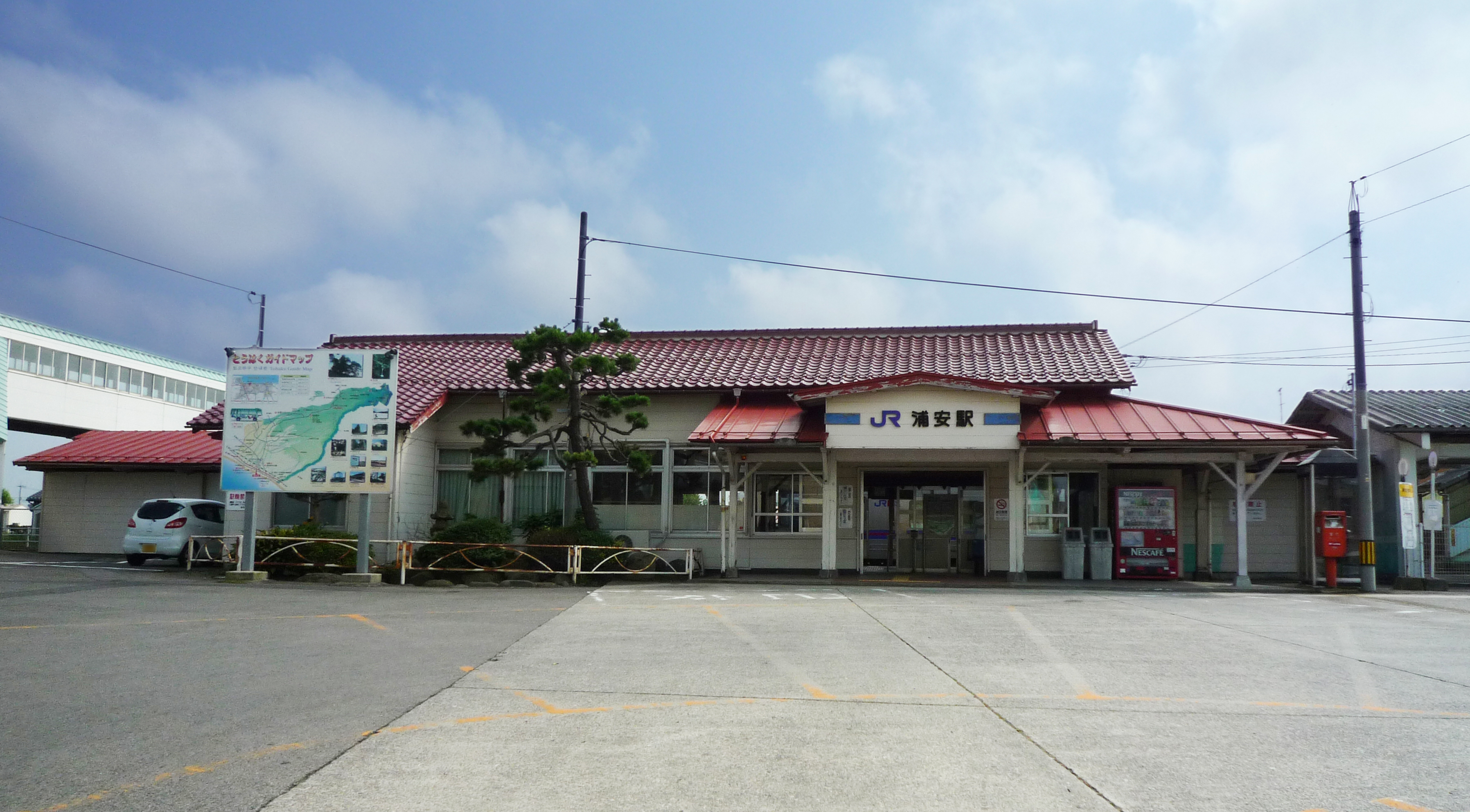
- Urayasu Station, August 2009

General information
- Location: 271, Ōaza Tokuman Aza Ōkubota,, Kotoura-chō, Tōhaku-gun, Tottori-ken 689-2303; Japan
- Coordinates: 35°29′58.8″N 133°41′36.1″E
- Operator: JR West
- Line: San'in Main Line
- Distance: 285.8 km (177.6 miles) from Kyoto
- Platforms: 2 side platforms
- Tracks: 2

Construction
- Structure type: At grade

Other information
- Status: Unstaffed
- Website: Official website

History
- Opened: 28 August 1903
- Former names: Yabase (to 1938); Higashi-Yabase (to 1949)

Passengers
- 2018: 762 daily

Services
Preceding station	JR West	Following station
Yabase towards Yonago	San'in Line Local	Yura towards Kinosaki-Onsen
Akasaki towards Yonago	San'in Line Tottori Liner	Yura towards Kinosaki-Onsen
Location
- Location within Tottori Prefecture Location within Japan

Urayasu Station (浦安駅, Urayasu-eki) is a passenger railway station located in the town of Kotoura, Tottori Prefecture, Japan. It is operated by the West Japan Railway Company (JR West).

== Lines ==
Urayasu Station is served by the San'in Main Line, and is located 285.8 kilometers from the terminus of the line at Kyoto.

== Station layout ==
The station consists of two ground-level opposed side platforms connected by a level crossing to the station building. The station is unattended.

=== Platforms ===
1	■ San'in Main Line	for Kurayoshi and Tottori
2	■ San'in Main Line	for Yonago and Matsue (express)

== History ==
Urayasu Station opened on August 28, 1903 as Yabase Station (八橋駅). It was renamed Higashi-Yabase Station (東八橋駅) on August 20, 1938, and became Urayasu Station on December 15, 1949. With the privatization of the Japan National Railways (JNR) on April 1, 1987, the station came under the aegis of the West Japan Railway Company.

== Passenger statistics ==
In fiscal 2018, the station was used by an average of 762 passengers daily.

== Surrounding area ==
- Kotoura Town Hall
- Kotoura Town Lifelong Learning Center "Manabi Town Tohaku"
- Kotoura Town Library Main Building
- Kotoura Municipal Tohaku Junior High School

== See also ==
- List of railway stations in Japan
