= Kurayoshi Station =

Railway station in Kurayoshi, Tottori Prefecture, Japan

Kurayoshi Station 倉吉駅
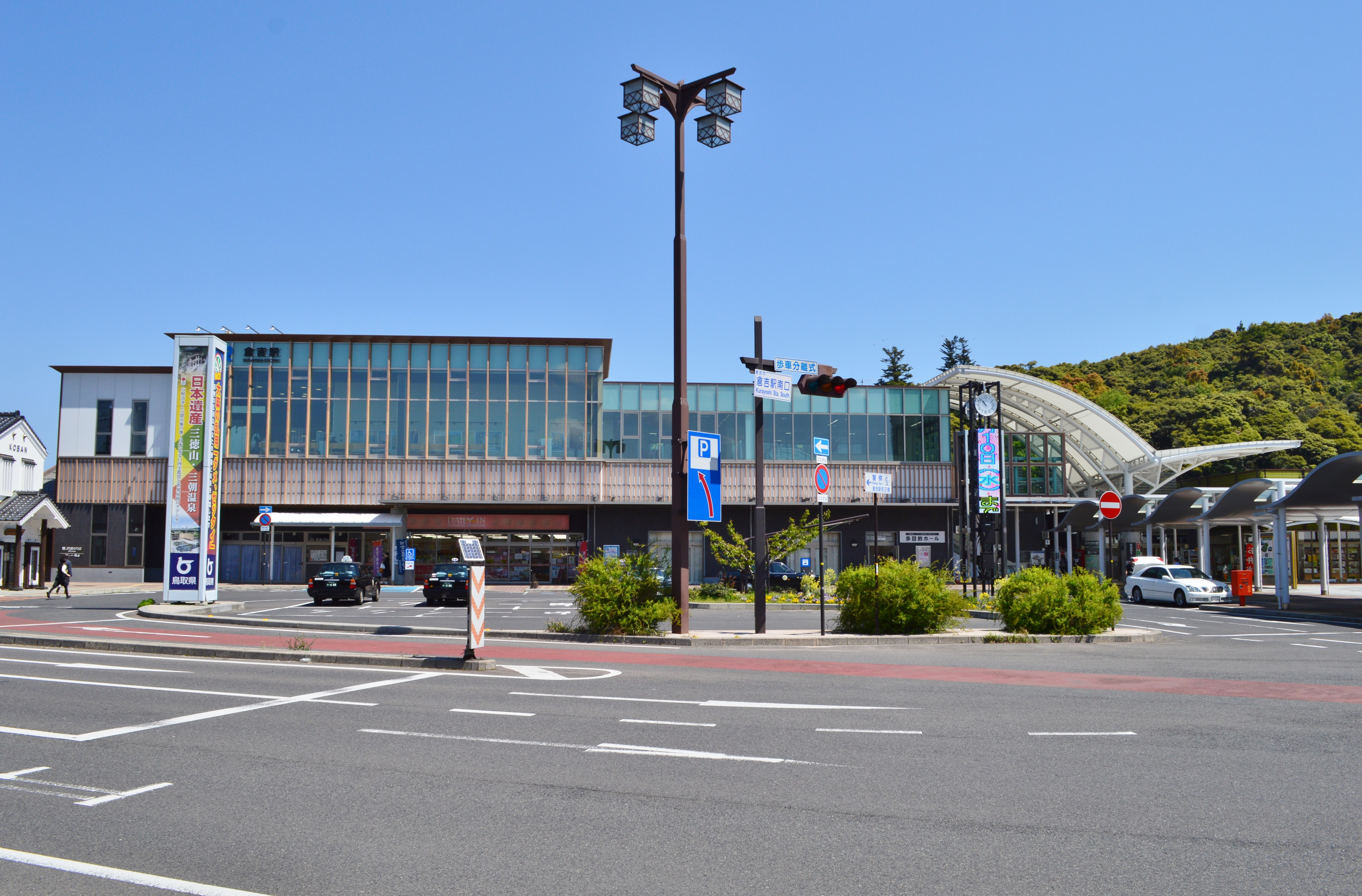
- Kurayoshi Station, April 2017

General information
- Location: 195–3, Agei, Kurayoshi-shi, Tottori-ken682-0021; Japan
- Coordinates: 35°27′16.46″N 133°50′58.34″E
- Operator: JR West
- Line: San'in Main Line
- Distance: 270.1 km (167.8 miles) from Kyoto
- Platforms: 1 side + 1 island platform
- Tracks: 2

Other information
- Status: Staffed Midori no Madoguchi
- Website: Official website

History
- Opened: 20 December 1903
- Former names: Agei (1912 to 1972)

Passengers
- 2018: 4440 daily
Location
- Location within Tottori Prefecture Location within Japan

Kurayoshi Station (倉吉駅, Kurayoshi-eki) is a passenger railway station located in the city of Kurayoshi, Tottori Prefecture, Japan. It is operated by the West Japan Railway Company (JR West).

== Lines ==
Kurayoshi Station is served by the San'in Main Line, and is located 270.1 kilometers from the terminus of the line at Kyoto.

== Station layout ==
The station consists of one ground-level side platform and one island platform connected by an elevated station building. The station has a Midori no Madoguchi staffed ticket office.

=== Platforms ===
1	■ San'in Main Line	for Yonago and Matsue for Tottori and Kyoto
2	■ San'in Main Line	for Tottori and Kyoto
3	■ San'in Main Line	for Yonago and Matsue for Tottori and Kyoto

== Adjacent stations ==
West Japan Railway Company (JR West)

«	Service	»
Sanin Main Line
Tottori	Limited Express Super Hakuto	Terminus
Tottori	Limited Express Super Oki	Yonago
Tottoridaigakumae	Limited Express Super Matsukaze	Hōki-Daisen
Matsuzaki	Express "Tottori Liner"	Shimohōjō
Matsuzaki	Local	Shimohōjō

== History ==
Kurayoshi Station opened on 20 December 1903. It was renamed Agei Station (上井駅) on 1 May 1912, but reverted to its original name on 14 February 1972. With the privatization of the Japan National Railways (JNR) on 1 April 1987, the station came under the aegis of the West Japan Railway Company. A new station building was completed in July 2022.

== Passenger statistics ==
In fiscal 2018, the station was used by an average of 4440 passengers daily.

== Surrounding area ==
- Tottori College of Nursing
- Tottori Junior College
- Tottori Prefectural Kurayoshi General Industrial High School
- Kurayoshi North High School
- Tottori Prefectural Industrial Human Resource Development Center

== See also ==
- List of railway stations in Japan
