= Ōmidō temple ruins =

Archaeological site in Tottori, Japan

- 大御堂廃寺跡 (Japanese)
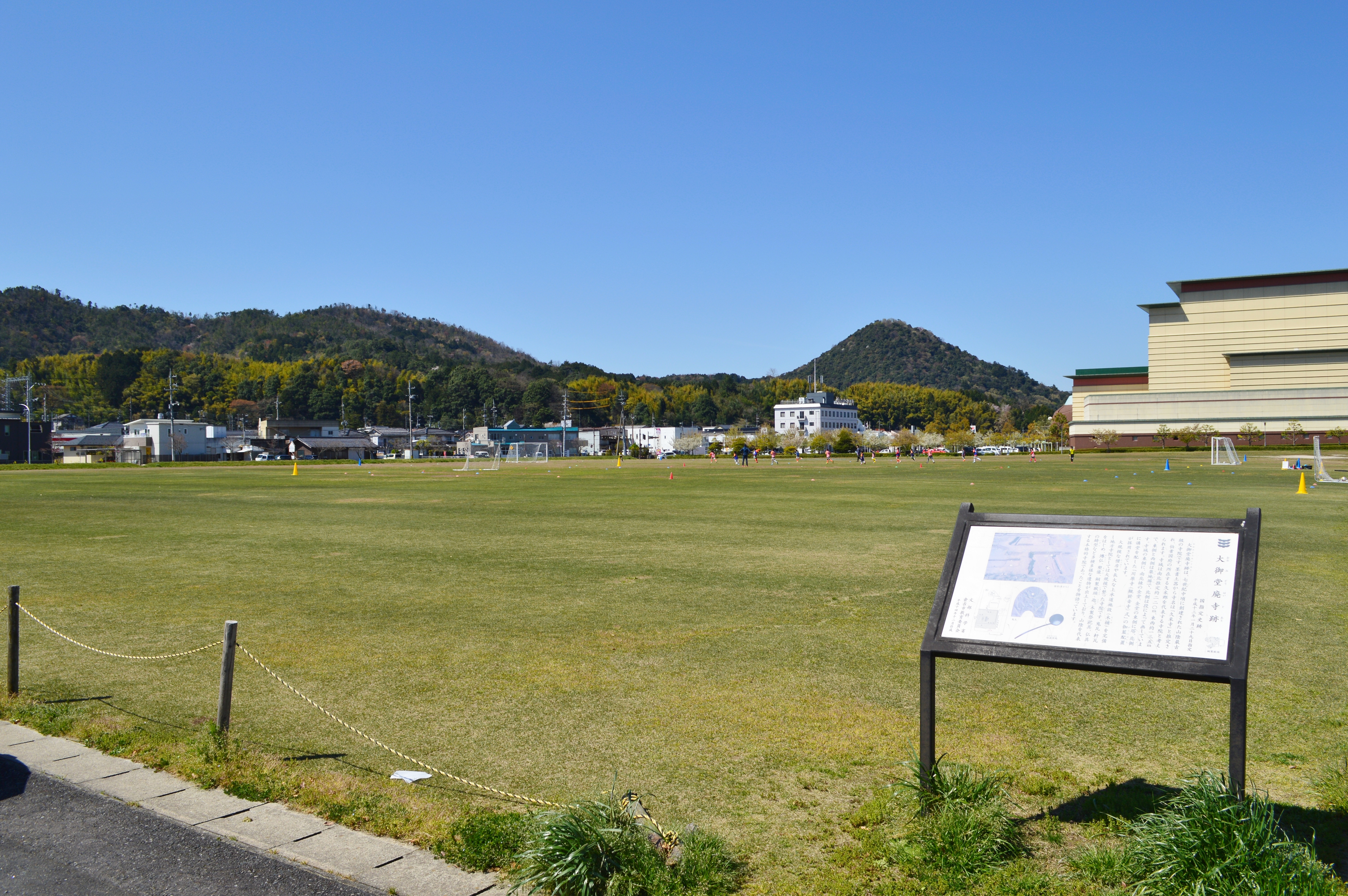
- Ōmidō temple ruins

- Ōmidō temple ruins Ōmidō temple ruins (Japan)
- Interactive map of Ōmidō temple ruins
- 35°25′52.30″N 133°50′18.45″E
- Type: temple ruins
- Periods: Nara period
- Location: Kurayoshi, Tottori, Japan
- Region: San'in region

History
- Built: 7th century AD

Site notes
- Public access: Yes (park)

Ōmidō temple ruins (大御堂廃寺跡, Ōmidō Haiji ato) is an archaeological site with the ruins of a Nara period Buddhist temple located in the Daikyōji- neighborhood of the city of Kurayoshi, Tottori Prefecture, in the San'in region of Japan. It was designated as a National Historic Site in 2001.

== History ==
The Ōmidō ruins are one of the largest temple ruins in the San'in region, and are located near the middle basin of the Ogamo River. Locals had long suspected ancient ruins in the area, and the foundation stones of a Japanese pagoda were found when the site was cleared for a factory in 1952. An archaeological excavation was not conducted until after the factory was closed in 1986, and from 1994 to 2000 subsequent excavations uncovered the foundations of more buildings and the layout of the temple have been clarified. The pagoda foundations correspond to a building 9.6 meters on each side. The foundations of the Main Hall correspond to a building 12.3 x 18.4 meters, and that of the Lecture Hall to a building of 32 x 16 meters. The foundations of the cloister were well preserved on the west side, indicating a width of 6.9 meters. North of the Lecture Hall were two buildings consisting of three rooms each on the east and west sides, believed that have been priest's quarters. The southern end of the site is less clear, but the total grounds of the temple complex were 135 meters east-to-west by 165 meters north-to-south. The layout of the temple appears to have been patterned after Kanzeon-ji, a seventh-century temple in Dazaifu, Fukuoka, with the Main Hall to the west, the pagoda to the east, and the lecture hall and monastic chambers to the north. The temple also had a water supply system with cisterns and wooden gutters. Excavated artifacts included a large quantity of roof tiles, earthenware, and wooden and metal items. In particular, various Buddhist-related relics such as fragments of Buddha statues, stone Bodhisattva statues, copper spoons, copper animal heads, and moulds for Buddhist altar fittings have been found. These artifacts date the temple to the mid-7th century. The roof tiles fall into four chronological periods: their quarter of the 7th century, fourth quarter of the 7th century, first half of the 8th century and 3rd quarter of the 8th century. There were no roof tiles in common with the nearby Hōki Kokubun-ji, indicating that the temple had a complete different status.

Some earthenware is labelled "Kume-dera" (久米寺) in black ink, which may have been the name of the temple as it is located in Kume district of Hōki Province, approximately five kilometers east of the location of the Hōki Provincial Capital; however, the temple does not appear in historical documentation, and its history is unknown. It is speculated that it was the clan temple of the influential ruling family who built the nearby Sanmyōji Kofun. Basad on lack of subsequent artifacts, it be presumed to have been abolished around the 11th century. The site is now maintained as a park.

== See also ==
- List of Historic Sites of Japan (Tottori)
