= Iwai temple ruins =

- 岩井廃寺跡 (Japanese)
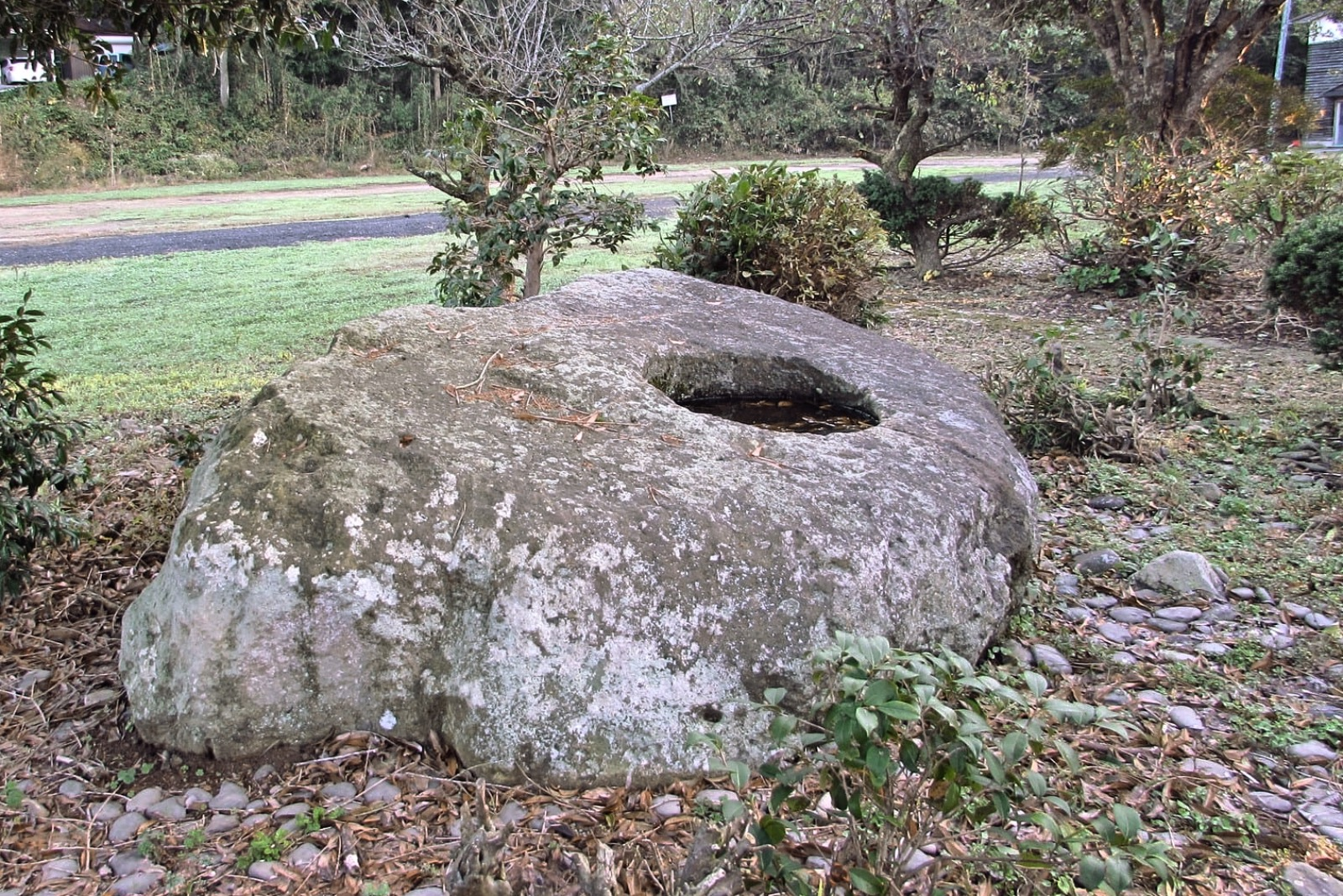
- Iwai temple ruins pagoda foundation stone

- Iwai temple ruins Iwai temple ruins (Japan)
- Interactive map of Iwai temple ruins
- 35°33′25″N 134°22′08″E
- Type: temple ruins
- Periods: Hakuhō period
- Location: Iwami, Tottori, Japan
- Region: San'in region

History
- Built: 6th century AD

Site notes
- Public access: Yes (no facilities)

Iwai temple ruins (岩井廃寺跡, Iwai haiji ato) is an archaeological site with the ruins of a Hakuhō period Buddhist temple located in the Iwai neighborhood of the town of Iwami in the San'in region of Japan. The foundations of a Japanese pagoda were designated as a National Historic Site in 1931.

== History ==
The Iwai ruins are located at the foot of the mountain on the right bank of the Gamo River, in front of the entrance of the former Iwai Elementary School. The above ground remains include a huge tuff stone foundation block, which has been known since antiquity and which locals call the "oni bowl" (demon bowl). This is the central base of a three-storied pagoda. The base has a length of 3.64 meters and length of 2.36 meters with a 1.4 meter deep central hole which once held the central beam of the pagoda. From this size, it can be calculated that the height of the tower was approximately 31meters. In addition, a round eaves roof tiles with a lotus pattern have been unearthed nearby. An archaeological excavation was conducted in 1985, and although the complete layout of the temple could not be confirmed, it is believed to have been patterned after the temple of Hokki-ji in Ikaruga, Nara.

Per historical records, there was once temple at this location called Miroku-ji, which had been founded by Saichō. On his return from Tang China, he stayed at a hot spring in what is now Iwai in Inaba Province and saw a large camphor tree from which he carved three statues of Yakushi Nyorai, the healing Buddha. One of these statues was transferred in the Heian period to the temple of Iwaisan Ensan-ji in Gifu Prefecture, where it is now designated as a National Important Cultural Property.

== See also ==
- List of Historic Sites of Japan (Tottori)
