= Ōtaka Kanga ruins =

Archaeological site in Japan

Ōtakano Kanga ruins
- 大高野官衙遺跡 (Japanese)
- Ōtakano Kanga ruins Ōtaka Kanga ruins (Japan)
- Interactive map of Ōtakano Kanga ruins
- 35°29′43″N 133°41′34″E
- Periods: Nara - Heian period
- Location: Kotoura, Tottori, Japan
- Region: San'in region

History
- Built: 7th-9th century AD

Site notes
- Elevation: 27 m (89 ft)
- Public access: No

The Ōtakano Kanga ruins (大高野官衙遺跡, Ōtakano kanga iseki) is an archaeological site with the ruins of a Nara to Heian period government administrative complex located in what is now the Tsukishita neighborhood of the town of Kotoura in Tottori prefecture in the San'in region of Japan. The site has been protected as a National Historic Site from 2014.

== Overview ==
In the late Nara period, after the establishment of a centralized government under the Ritsuryō system, local rule over the provinces was standardized under a kokufu (provincial capital), and each province was divided into smaller administrative districts, known as (郡, gun, kōri), composed of 2–20 townships in 715 AD. Each of the units had an administrative complex, or kanga (官衙遺跡) built on a semi-standardized layout based on contemporary Chinese design.

The Konda Ōtakano ruins are believed to be the site of the Shōsō (warehouses where tax grains and property were stored) of a local government complex that existed from the end of the 7th century to the latter half of the 9th century. Some 350 meters to the west across the valley from this site is the Saioo temple ruins (Special Historic Site), from the late Asuka period. Archaeological excavations of the site commenced in 1981, including by ground-penetrating radar in 2003, and the traces of numerous structures was confirmed. These included 23 pillared building foundations, three traces of fences and five traces of ditches. Many of the buildings had densely-located support pillars, indicating a raised floor construction with a design to support considerable weight and were located in orderly rows. In addition, the presence of carbonized grains were unearthed has led to this site being identified as the taxation warehouse granary of Yatsuhashi County, Hōki Province.

The main part of the ruins is a rectangular site measuring 105 meters from north-to-south and 130 meters from east-to-west. There is evidence indicating that the site was expanded to the east and south at one pint. Based the ages of the unearthed Sue ware and Haji ware pottery, it is believed that the government office lasted from the end of the 7th century to the latter half of the 9th century, divided into the three periods. Phase I was from the end of the 7th century to the middle of the 8th century. Phase II is from the 8th century to the first half of the 9th century, and consists mainly of foundation stone buildings. Phase III is the latter half of the 9th century, when new ditches were dug and the site was expanded.

The site is located near the Ōtaka Kofun cluster, a group of small-scale kofun burial mounds from the middle to late Kofun period (5th to 7th centuries). However, at present, only Mound No. 4 (round mound) remains at the southern end of the designated historic site, and the tumuli have been destroyed.

== See also ==
- List of Historic Sites of Japan (Tottori)
