= Hajimomoi temple ruins =

Japanese Buddhist temple ruins from the Hakuhō period

- 土師百井廃寺跡 (Japanese)
- Hajimomoi temple ruins Hajimomoi temple ruins (Japan)
- 35°24′26″N 134°13′54″E
- Type: temple ruins
- Periods: Hakuhō period
- Location: Yazu, Tottori, Japan
- Region: San'in region

History
- Built: 6th century AD

Site notes
- Public access: Yes (no facilities)
- National Historic Site of Japan

Hajimomoi temple ruins (土師百井廃寺跡, Hajimomoi Haiji ato) is an archaeological site with the ruins of a Hakuhō period Buddhist temple located in the Hajimomoi neighborhood of the town of Yazu, Tottori Prefecture, in the San'in region of Japan. The foundations of its Japanese pagoda were designated as a National Historic Site in 1931, and the designation expanded to cover then remaining temple ruins in 1980

== History ==
The Hajimomoi ruins are presumed to be the site of Jijū-ji (慈住寺), a temple which, per historical records, was built between the Hakuhō period and the early Nara period. The foundation stones of the ruins of the pagoda have been known for a long time, and roof tiles indicating that it was built in the latter half of the 7th century have been found in the area. As a result of archaeological excavations conducted in 1978 when a field improvement project was started, it was confirmed that the pagoda foundation was a square with dimensions of 16 meters on each side. The foundations of the Main Hall (18 x 18 meters), Lecture Hall (30 x 19 meters), cloister (5.4 meters wide) and South Gate have all been discovered. The layout of the structures was patterned after the temple of Hokki-ji in Ikaruga, Nara with the pagoda on the east and the Main Hall to the west, side-by-side, and the Lecture Hall to the rear. Most of the foundation stones have been preserved in situ. The subsequent history of the temple and when it fell into ruins are uncertain. The site is five minutes by car from Kōge Station on the JR West Inbi Line.

== See also ==
- List of Historic Sites of Japan (Tottori)
