= Ōhara temple ruins =

Japanese Buddhist temple ruins

- 大原廃寺跡 (Japanese)
- Ōhara temple ruins Ōhara temple ruins (Japan)
- Interactive map of Ōhara temple ruins
- 35°25′13″N 133°51′30″E
- Type: temple ruins
- Periods: Hakuhō period
- Location: Kurayoshi, Tottori, Japan
- Region: San'in region

History
- Built: 6th century AD

Site notes
- Public access: Yes (no facilities)

Ōhara temple ruins (大原廃寺跡, Ōhara Haiji ato) is an archaeological site with the ruins of a Hakuhō period Buddhist temple located in the Ohara neighborhood of the city of Kurayoshi, Tottori Prefecture, in the San'in region of Japan. The foundations of its Japanese pagoda were designated as a National Historic Site in 1935.

== History ==
The Ōhara temple ruins are located on a hill on the right bank of the Takeda River. In 1934, the foundation of a large Japanese pagoda was discovered during land reclamation. The central foundation stone is 2.9 x 2.8 meters wide, and has a 65-cm diameter hole in the center, making it one of the largest in the San'in region. A stone wall presumed to be an earthen altar was also found, and roof tiles were unearthed nearby. Based on the style of the roof tiles, it is estimated that the pagoda was built before the latter half of the 8th century. In archaeological excavations starting in 1985, the foundation stones of the Main Hall, and Lecture Hall were discovered. The layout of the temple appears to be based on that of Hokki-ji in Ikaruga, Nara. The pagoda foundations were also confirmed to be about 10 meters on each side. This temple does not appear in any historical record, so its actual name and history are unknown. The artifacts discovered are preserved in the Kurayoshi Museum, and the ruins of the temple are open to the public.

== See also ==
- List of Historic Sites of Japan (Tottori)
