= Mukoeyama Kofun Cluster =

Mukoyama Kofun cluster
- 向山古墳群 (Japanese)
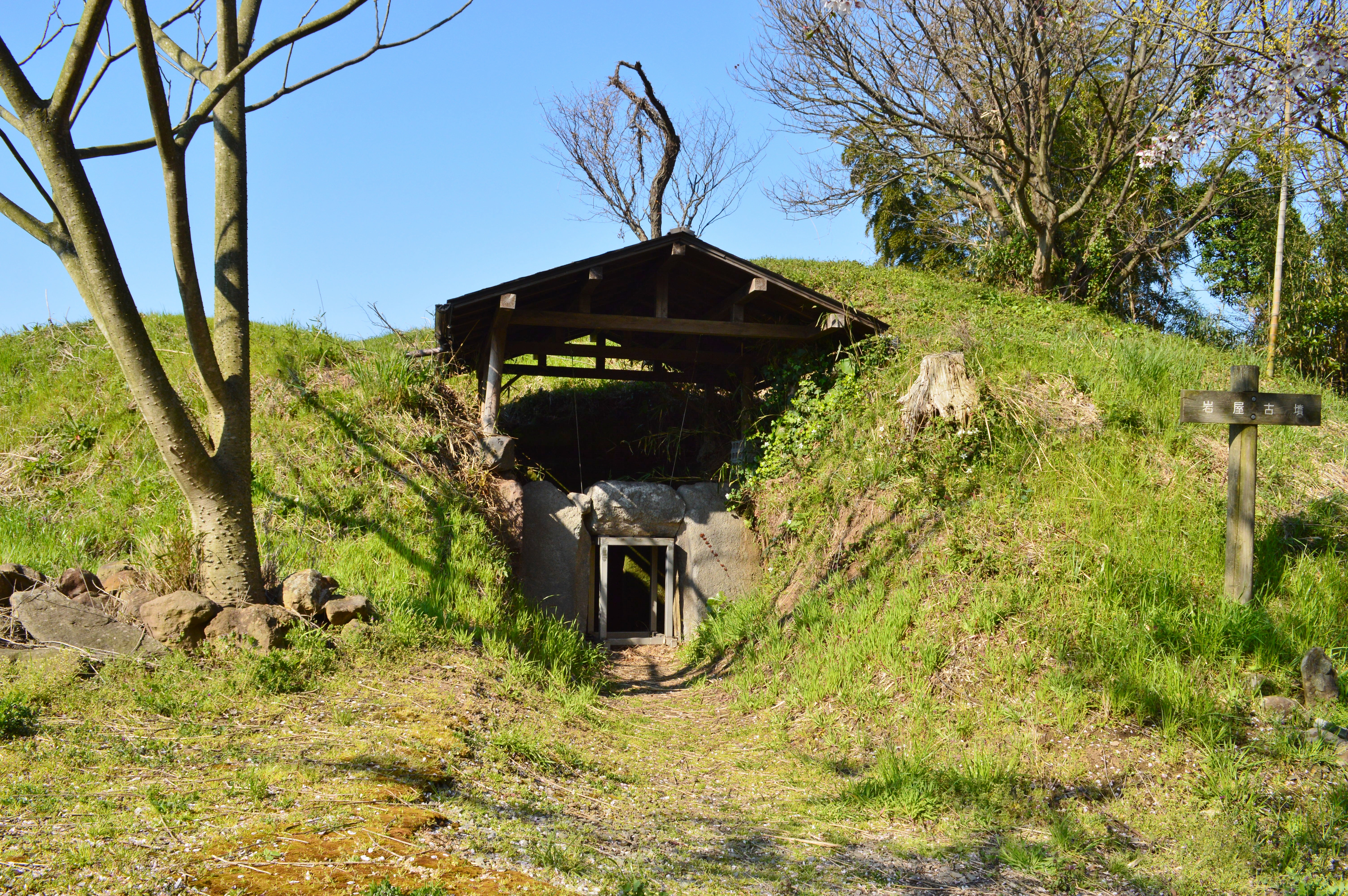
- Iwaya Kofun entrance

- Mukoyama Kofun cluster Mukoeyama Kofun Cluster (Japan)
- Interactive map of Mukoyama Kofun cluster
- 35°27′16.4″N 133°26′25.9″E
- Type: Kofun cluster
- Periods: Kofun period
- Location: Yonago, Tottori, Japan
- Region: San'in region

Site notes
- Public access: Yes (park)

The Mukoyama Kofun cluster (向山古墳群, Mukoyama Kofun-gun) is a cluster of Kofun period burial mounds located in the Yodoe neighborhood of the city of Yonago, Tottori Prefecture, in the San'in region of Japan. It was designated a National Historic Site in 1932, with the area under protection expanded in 1999.

== Overview ==
During the Kofun period, the Yodoe Plain formed a lagoon, and hundreds of burial mounds were constructed in the surrounding hills. The Mukaiyama cluster is located to the east of the lagoon, and consists of a 17 kofun, including nine keyhole-shaped, five circular, and two square burial mounds. Within this group, the Iwaya Kofun (Mukoyama No.1) is a zenpō-kōen-fun (前方後円墳), which is shaped like a keyhole, having one square end and one circular end, when viewed from above, with a length of 54 meters, height of six meters and a stone burial chamber. Its design shows an influence of the Izumo region. In addition to fukiishi, cylindrical haniwa and figurative haniwa (warrior dolls, horse-shaped haniwa, waterfowl-shaped haniwa, etc.) have been found. Grave goods included Iron swords and gilt-bronze harnesses. The tumulus is estimated to have been constructed in the latter half of the 6th century in the late Kofun period. It was designated a National Historic Site in 1932.

From 1985 to 1989, an extensive surveying and archaeological excavation was conducted, and the area of the National Historic Site designation expanded in 1999. Among the kofun constructed from the latter half of the 5th century to the latter half of the 6th century, Mukaiyama No. 3, Mukaiyama No. 4, Ishiumadani, and Iwaya Kofun were typical zenpō-kōen-fun of western Hoki Province. A stone horse found in the Edo period at the Ishiumatani Kofun suggest exchanges with northern Kyushu, and the only other known examples are from that region. It was made the shintai of a nearby Shinto shrine and was designated a National Important Cultural Property in 1959.

Currently, the site is open to the public as Hōki Kodai no Oka Park (伯耆古代の丘公園), located about five minutes by car from Yodoe Station on the JR West San'in Main Line.

== Gallery ==
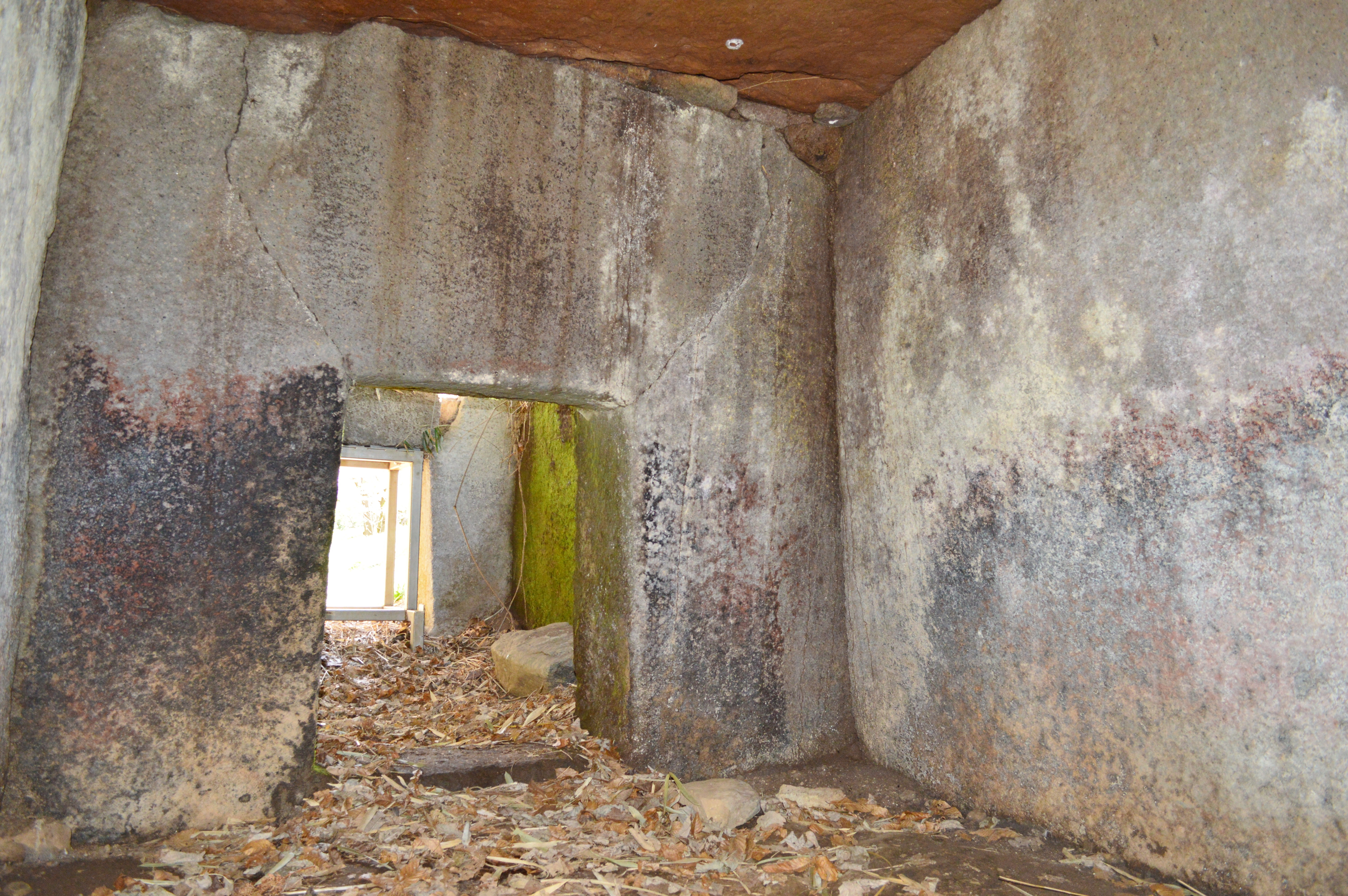
Mukoyama No.1 (Iwaya Kofun) sarcophagus

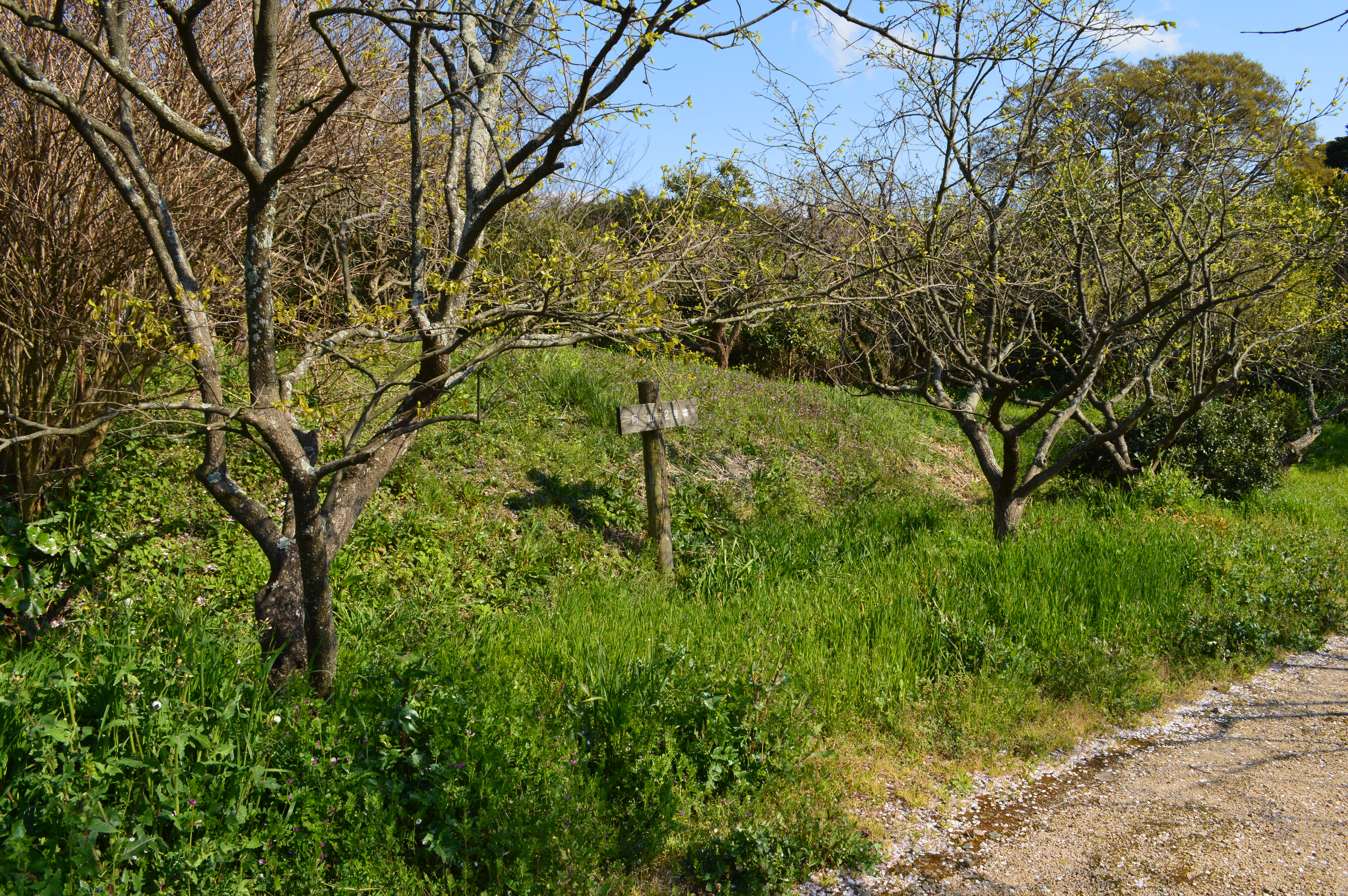
Mukoyama No.3

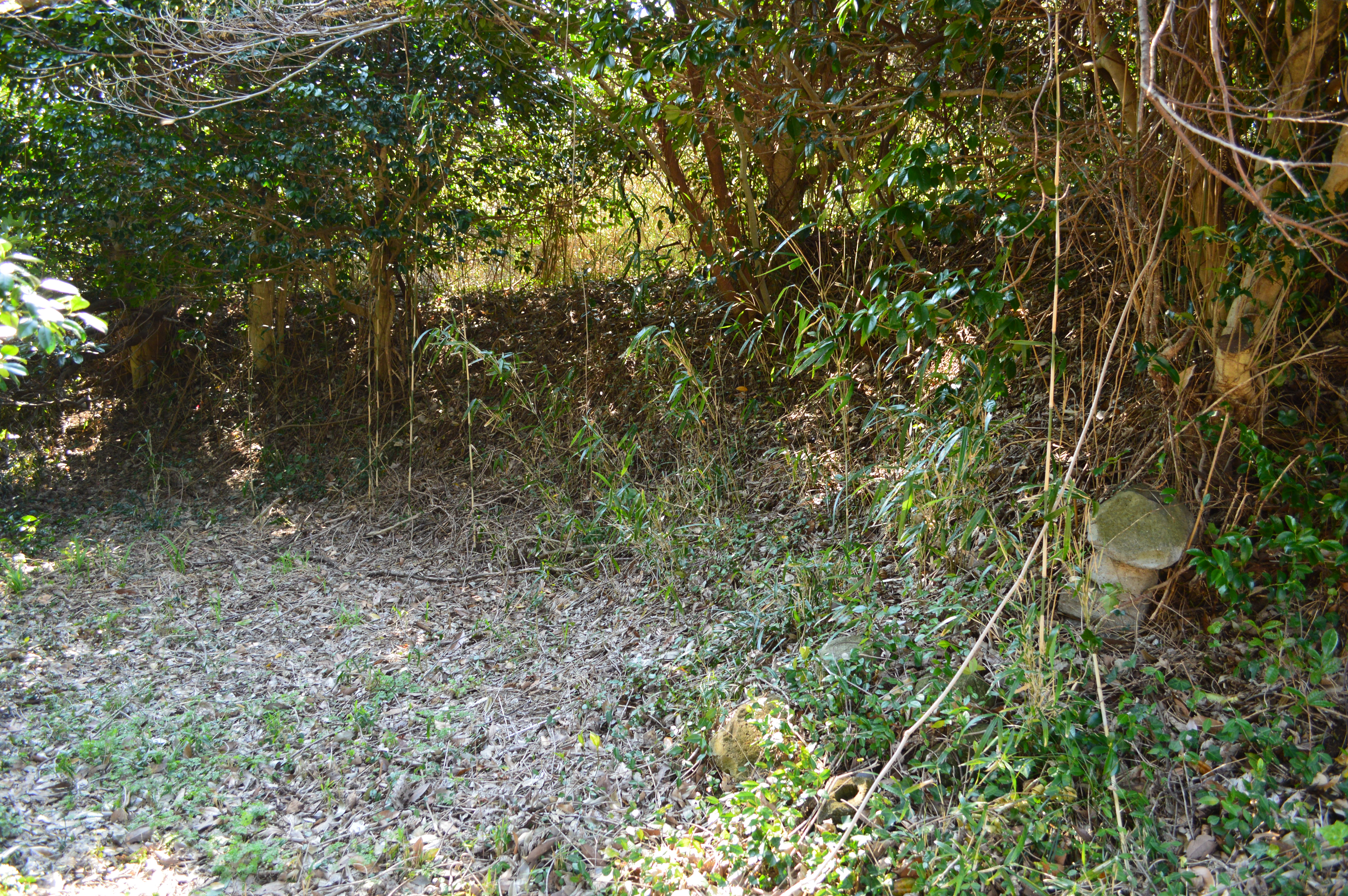
Mukoyama No.3

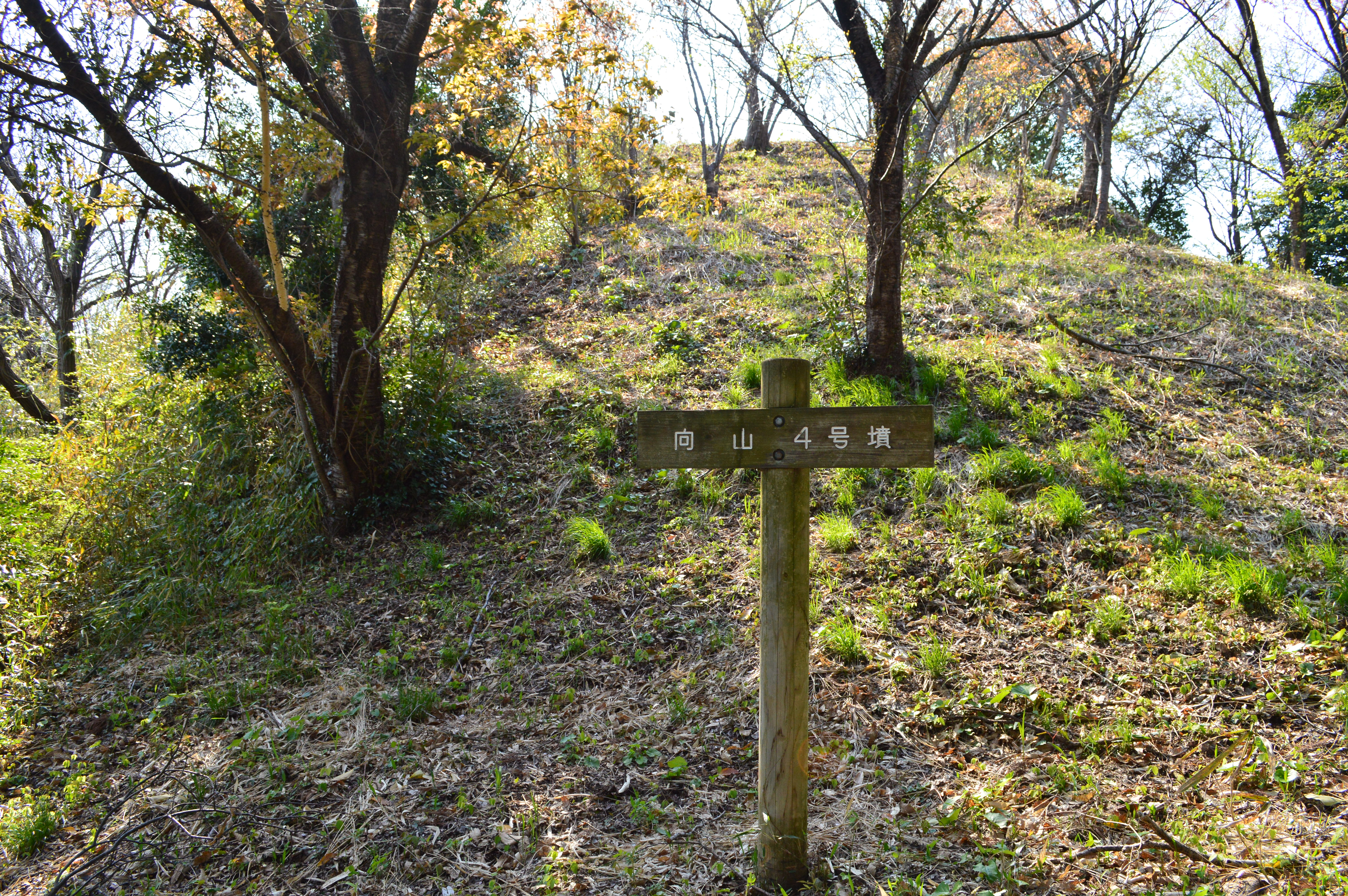
Mukoyama No.4

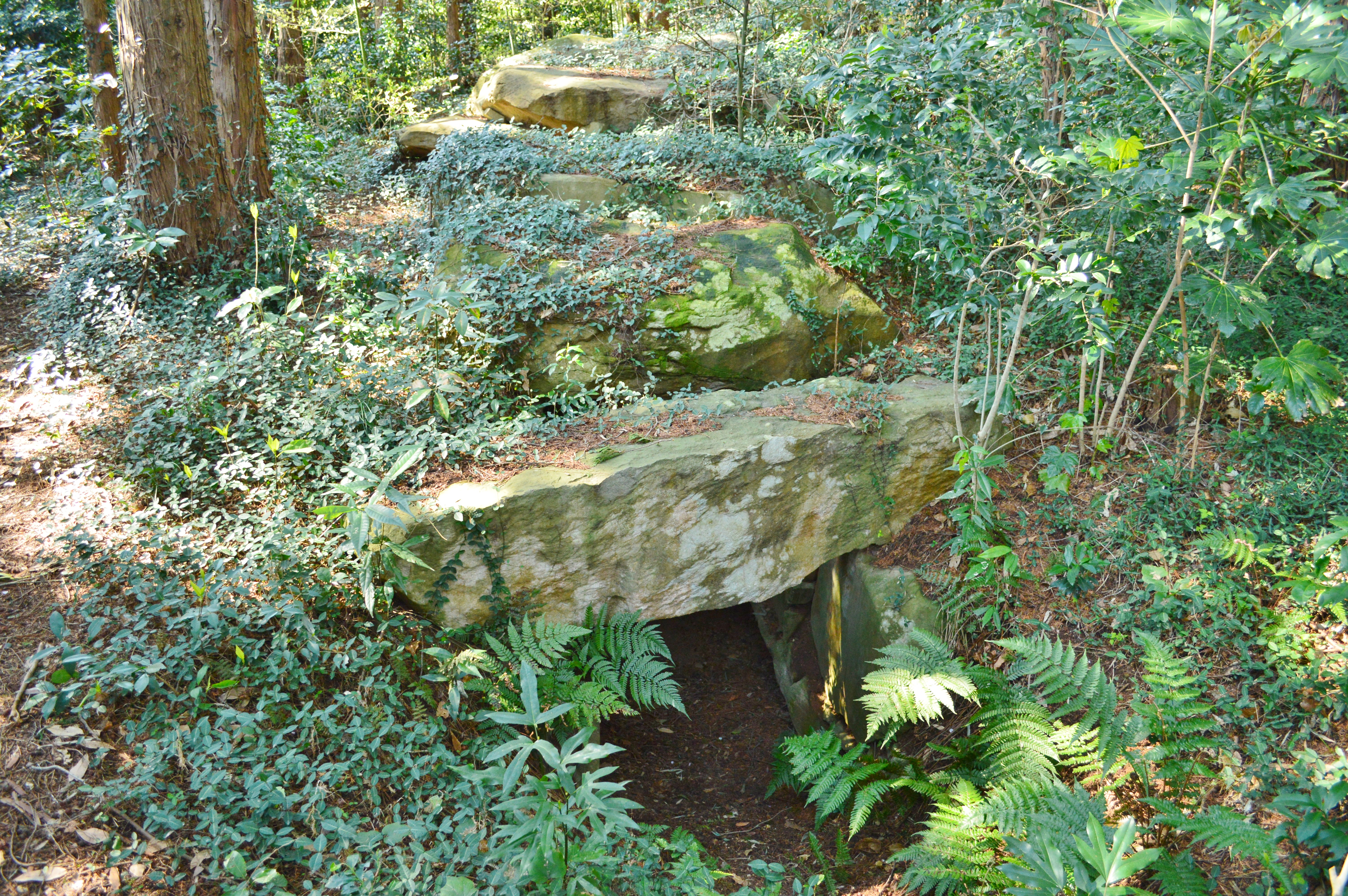
Mukoyama No.5

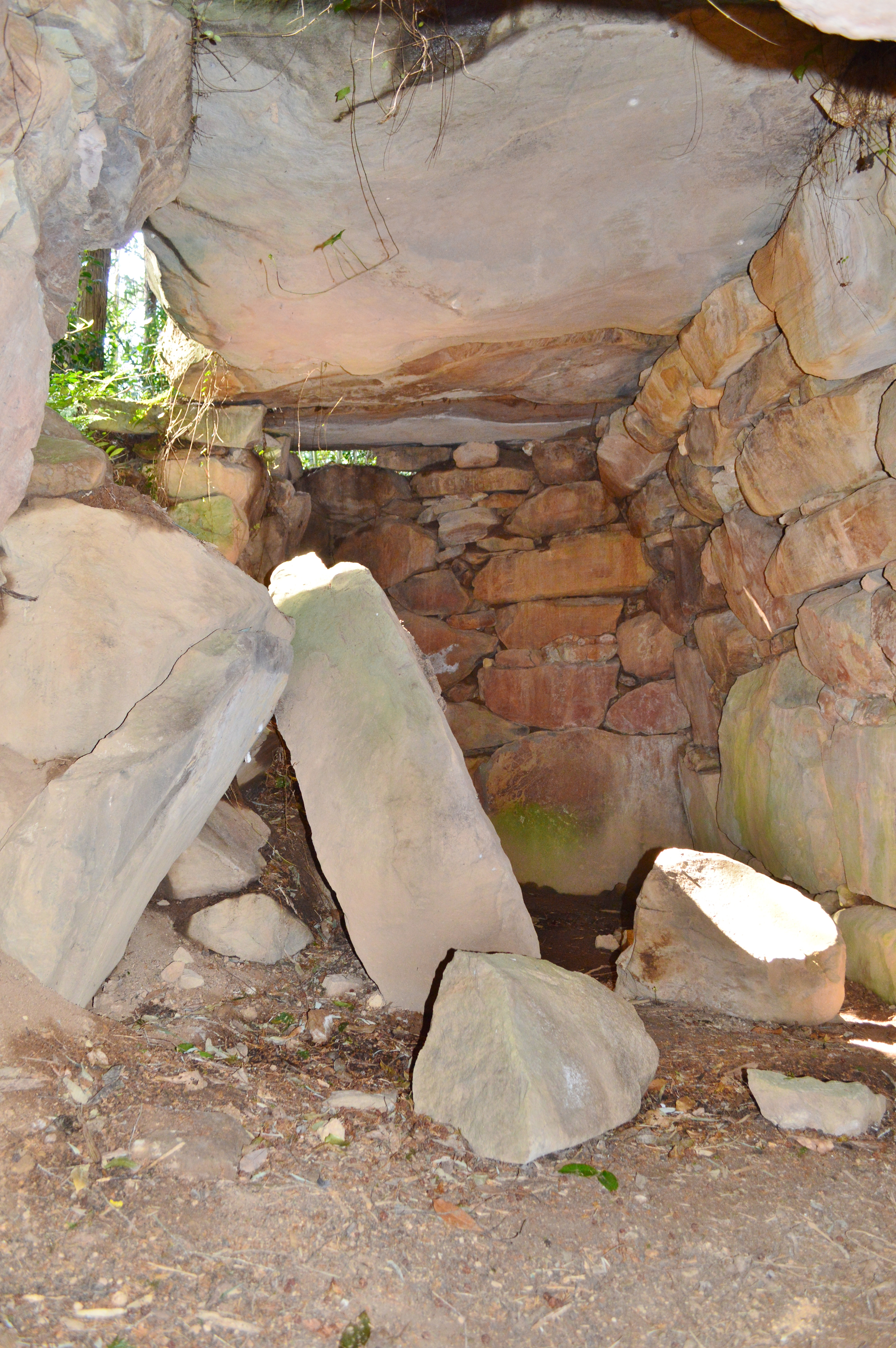
Mukoyama No.5 sarcophagus

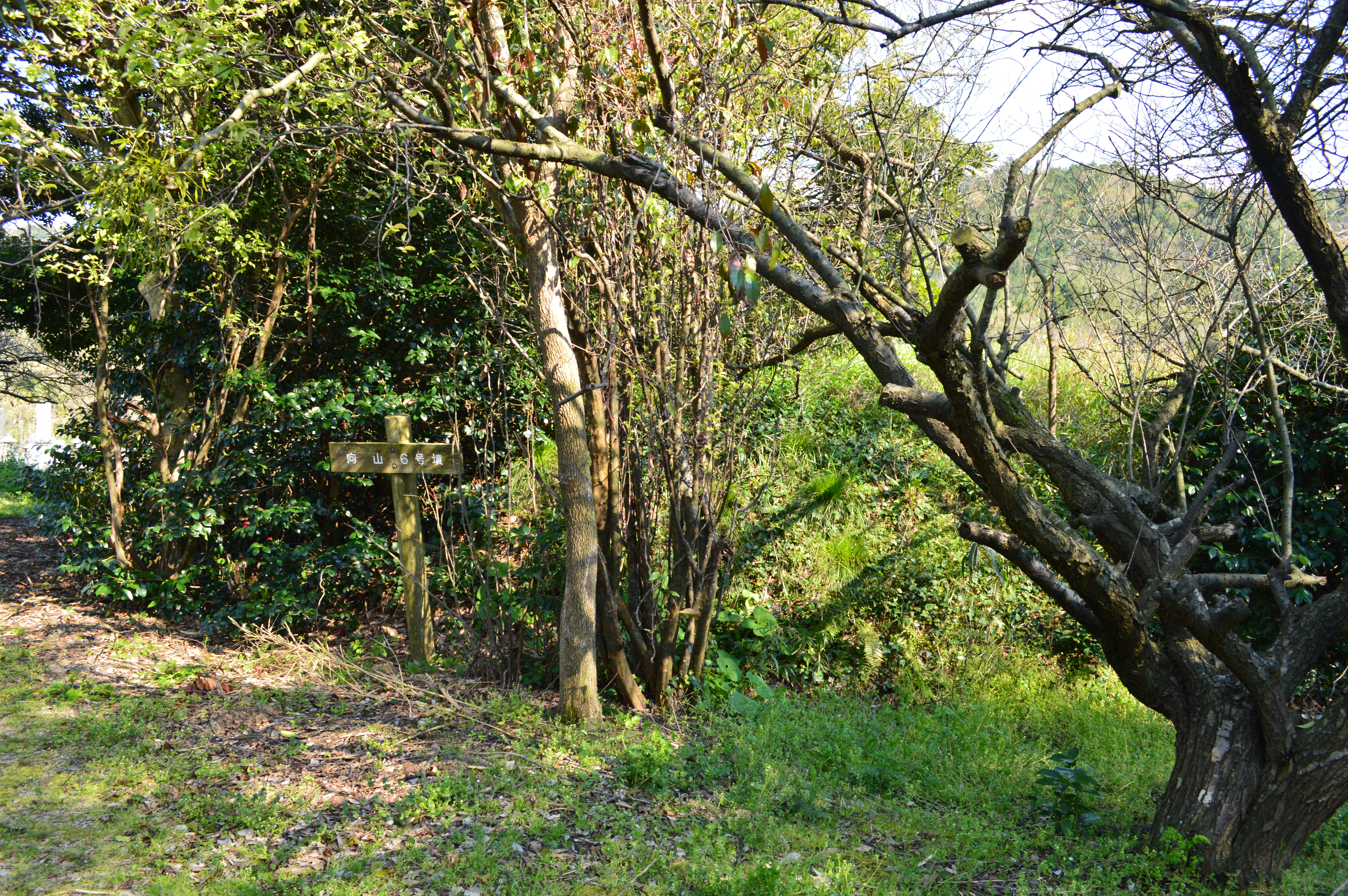
Mukoyama No.6

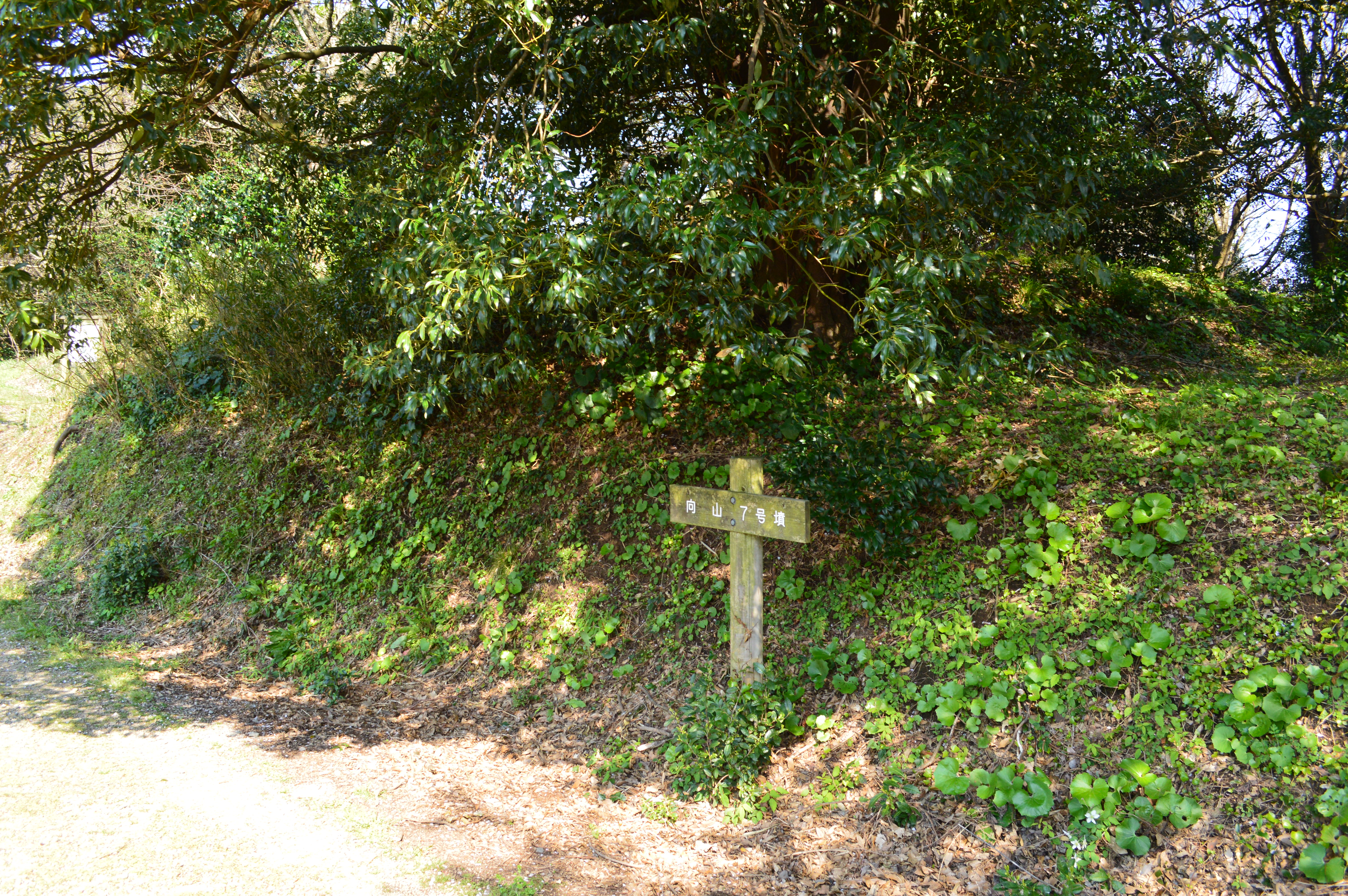
Mukoyama No.7

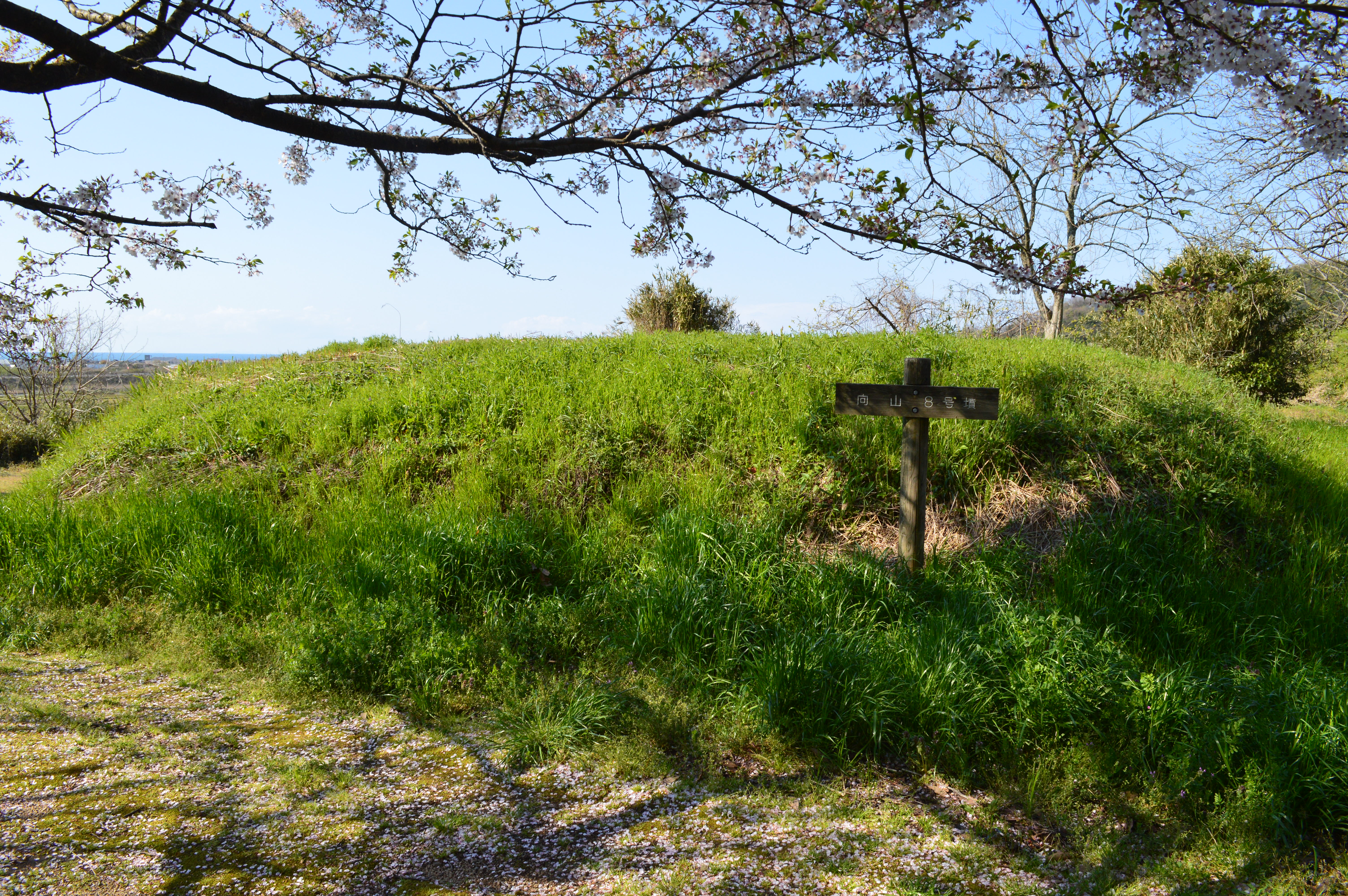
Mukoyama No.8

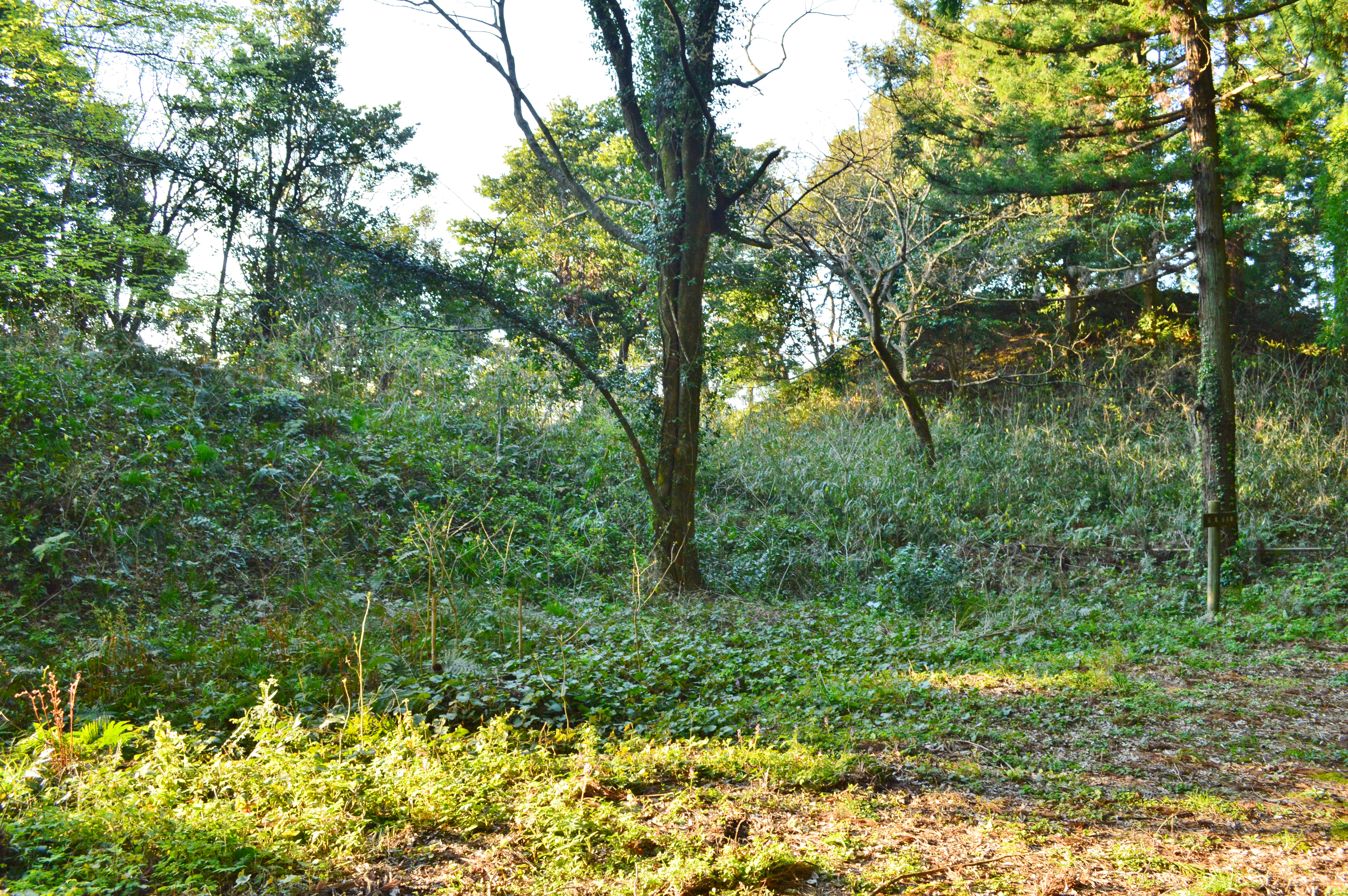
Ishiumadani Kofun

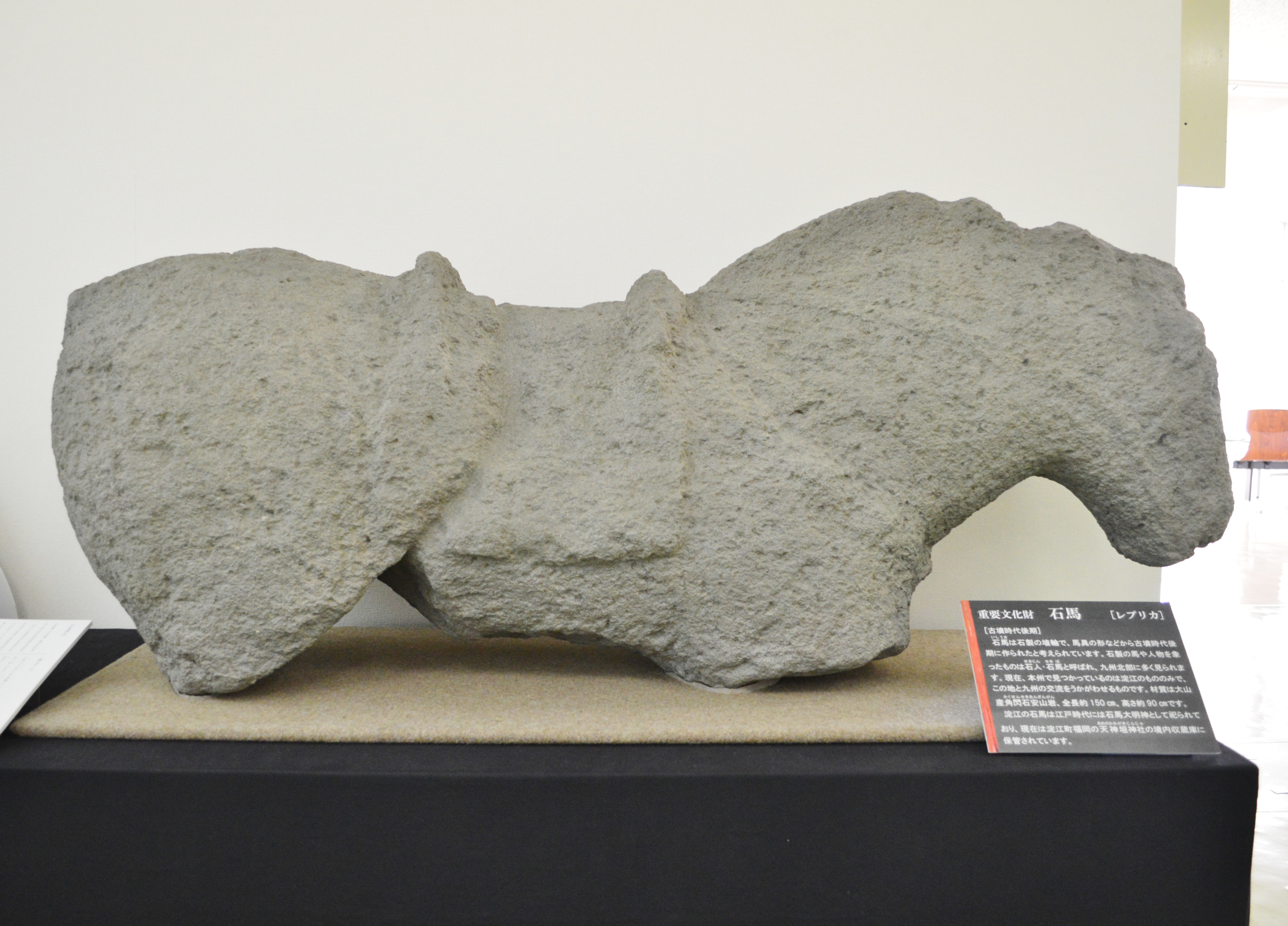
Stone horse (ICP) from Ishiumadani Kofun

== See also ==
- List of Historic Sites of Japan (Tottori)
