= Tochimoto temple ruins =

Archaeological site in Japan

- 栃本廃寺跡 (Japanese)
- Tochimoto temple ruins Tochimoto temple ruins (Japan)
- Interactive map of Tochimoto temple ruins
- 35°28′16″N 134°22′15″E
- Type: Temple ruins
- Periods: Hakuhō period
- Location: Tottori, Tottori, Japan
- Region: San'in region

History
- Built: 6th century AD

Site notes
- Public access: Yes (no facilities)

Tochimoto temple ruins (栃本廃寺跡, Tochimoto Haiji ato) is an archaeological site with the ruins of a Hakuhō period Buddhist temple located in the Kokufucho neighborhood of the city of Tottori, Tottori prefecture, in the San'in region of Japan. The foundations of its Japanese pagodas were designated as a National Historic Site in 1935, and the designation expanded to cover the remaining temple ruins in 2004.

== History ==
The Tochimoto ruins are located on the right bank of the Oishi River, a tributary of the Fukuro River. The temple is unique in the San'in region as its layout was patterned after Yakushi-ji in Nara, with twin pagodas constructed side-by-side. The pagoda foundation stones with pillar holes and reliquary holes are separated by about 27.4 metres (89 ft 11 in). During a four-year archaeological excavation from 1997 revealed that the South Pagoda and Kondo Hall are lined up north to south, the Lecture Hall to the north of them is slightly shifted to the west, and the East Pagoda is located on the east side of the Kondo Hall. The Kondo was a 5 x 4 bay structure measuring 14.8 by 12.4 metres (48 ft 7 in × 40 ft 8 in). The Lecture Hall was also 5 x 4 bays, but slightly larger at 16.0 by 13.6 metres (52 ft 6 in × 44 ft 7 in). The East Pagoda had a base 8.4 metres (27 ft 7 in) square and the West Pagoda had a base 10 metres (32 ft 10 in) square, indicating that the pagodas may not have been identical in height. The total area the site is about 8,400 square metres (2.1 acres). It is believed that the temple was built without roof tiles, probably because it is located in a mountainous area with heavy snowfall.

== See also ==
- List of Historic Sites of Japan (Tottori)
