= Fuse Kofun =

- 布勢古墳 (Japanese)
- Fuse Kofun Fuse Kofun (Japan)
- 35°30′19″N 134°10′38″E
- Type: kofun
- Periods: Kofun period
- Location: Tottori (city), Tottori Prefecture Japan
- Region: San'in region

History
- Built: late 6th century AD

Site notes
- Public access: no facilities
- National Historic Site of Japan

The Fuse Kofun (布勢古墳) is a Kofun period burial mound located in the Fuse neighborhood of the city of Tottori, Tottori Prefecture in the San'in region of Japan. The tumulus was designated a National Historic Site of Japan in 1974.

== Monument ==
The Fuse area of Tottori city, in the vicinity of Lake Koyama in the western part of the Tottori Plain, contains many ancient tombs and archaeological sites, including a place where Yayoi period bronze dotaku have been discovered. The Fuse Kofun is located on the east bank of Lake Koyama, on a hill with an elevation of approximately 30 meters from its surroundings. The tumulus has not been excavated, so details of the burial chamber are unknown. Fragments of haniwa Haji ware and Sue ware pottery, and the shape of the tumulus, date it to the late Kofun period, or the first half of the 6th century.

The mound is a keyhole-shaped zenpō-kōen-fun (前方後円墳) type of kofun, orientated to the west. It is one of the larger tumuli is eastern Tottori Prefecture, with a total length of about 60 meters; the circular portion is approximately 29 meters in diameter and 5 meters high, and the rectangular portion is approximately 21 meters wide. No moat has been detected.

== See also ==
- List of Historic Sites of Japan (Tottori)
