= Aoyakamijichi Site =

Aoyakamijichi site
- 青谷上寺地遺跡 (Japanese)
- Aoyakamijichi site Aoyakamijichi Site (Japan)
- 35°30′48.0″N 133°59′30.0″E
- Type: settlement
- Periods: Yayoi period
- Location: Tottori, Tottori, Japan
- Region: San'in region

History
- Built: 2nd century BC to 2nd century AD

Site notes
- Elevation: 10 m (33 ft)
- Excavation dates: 1998
- Public access: Yes (museum)
- National Historic Site of Japan

The Aoyakamijichi Site (青谷上寺地遺跡, Aoyakamijichi iseki) is an archaeological site with a Yayoi period settlement, located in the Aoya neighborhood of the city of Tottori in the San'in region of Japan. The site was designated a National Historic Site in 2008.

== Overview ==
The Aoyakamijichi site was discovered along with the construction of the Aoya-Hago Road and the Tottori Prefectural Road No. 274 Aoya Station Ide Line. Archaeological excavations since 1998 have revealed that the residential area was about 200 meters in diameter, and that paddy fields extended on the south and west sides for over 700 meters on the long side to about 300 meters on the short side, for a total of total of approximately 55,000 square meters. The settlement area began in the latter half of the early Yayoi period, expanded significantly in the latter half of the middle Yayoi period, continued to the latter period, and suddenly disappeared at the beginning of the early Kofun period. The overlapping foundations of numerous pillar-supported buildings and underground storage pits were found. However, the most unusual feature is a revetment facility made of massive cedar planks from the middle and latter half of the Yayoi period that extends across the southeastern part of the ruins. It was made from huge boards with a length of 260 cm and a width of 70 cm arranged side by side and fixed with stakes. In the later period, a ditch was built to surround the high range of the terrain, and rows of sheet piles were driven in many layers here. Some of these revetment facilities include planks that appear to have been converted from building materials. The site also yielded a very large number of artifacts. In addition to finished and unfinished woodware, bone and horn tools, animal bones, and metalware such as ironware and bronze ware, more than 5,300 human remains were also unearthed. Initial DNA testing on five of these remains revealed that two of the remains had markers of Haplogroup C-M8, which are mostly unique to Japanese populations. One of the remains belonged to Haplogroup D, another typically Japanese haplogroup presumed to derive from Jōmon period populations of the archipelago, and another one of the remains belonged to haplogroup O-M175. The Y-DNA haplogroup of the fifth specimen could not be determined. Subsequently, five more male specimens were tested; of these, two were assigned to Y-DNA haplogroup D (one of these more precisely to haplogroup D1b), two were assigned to haplogroup O1b2a1 (O-K10/O-F1204, one of which was assigned more precisely to the typically Japanese subclade O1b2a1a1), and the Y-DNA haplogroup of the last specimen could not be determined. Not only the Y-DNA, but also the mtDNA of specimens from Aoyakamijichi is similar to that of present-day Japanese: B4b1a1b x1, B4c1a1a1a x1, B4f x1, B5b1a2 x1, C1a x1, D4a1a1 x1, D4a2a x1, D4b2b1 x5, D4b2a2 x4, D4b2 x1, D4c1b1 x1, D4c1b2 x1, D4c2 x1, D4g1a x1, D4g1c x1, D5a1a1 x1, G1a1a2 x1, M7a1a1a x1, M7b1a1a1 x4 or x5 (one has been confidently determined only so far as M7b1a1), M9a1a1 x1, N9a2a x3, N9a2d x1, N9b x2. The mtDNA haplogroups of three samples have been indeterminable, though one of these may most likely belong to haplogroup M7b1a. Among the late Yayoi period bones found in a ditch on the east side of the site, 110 had wound marks. In addition, two bones are found to have lesions caused by vertebral caries, making these the oldest known tuberculosis case in Japan. Three skulls were found to contain organic materials that are the remnants of brain material. Another important find was a 120-cm fragment of a wooden shield made from momi fir, which had been painted green. This is the earliest known use of green pigment in East Asia. As many as 35 coprolites were unearthed, which also provides important knowledge for restoring the lives of people in the Yayoi period. Many of the relics indicate a relationship with the Asian continent, hinting at trade and cultural exchange during the Yayoi period across then Sea of Japan.

The site is open to the public, but the ruins have been backfilled. The excavated items are stored and exhibited at the Yayoi Museum Aoya Kamijichi Ruins Exhibition Hall located ten minutes on foot from Aoya Station on the JR West San'in Main Line. These artifacts were collective designated an Important Cultural Property in 2019.

== See also ==
- List of Historic Sites of Japan (Tottori)
