= Amidaji Kofun Cluster =

Group of Yayoi period burial mounds in Japan

Amidaji Kofun cluster
- 阿弥大寺古墳群 (Japanese)
- Amidaji Kofun cluster Amidaji Kofun Cluster (Japan)
- 35°25′24″N 133°45′13″E
- Type: kofun
- Periods: Yayoi period
- Location: Kurayoshi, Tottori, Tottori Prefecture Japan
- Region: San'in region

History
- Built: c. 3rd century AD

Site notes
- Public access: No facilities
- National Historic Site of Japan

The Amidaji Kofun cluster (阿弥大寺古墳群) is a group of three late Yayoi period burial mounds located in the Shimofukuda neighborhood of the city of Kurayoshi, Tottori Prefecture in the San'in region of Japan. The tumulus group was designated a National Historic Site of Japan in 1981.

== Overview ==
The Amidaji Kofun cluster is located on the side of a hill overlooking Kokubugawa River. The cluster consists of three Yosumi-tosshutsu-gata (四隅突出形)-style tumuli. This is a variation of the hōfun (方墳)-style square tumulus with polygonal-shaped protrusions on each of its four corners. This style is unique to the Kibi, San'in and San'yō regions of Japan. Tumulus No. 1 is about 17.8 meters long, including protrusions, Tumulus No. 2 is 8.8 meters long, and Tumulus No. 3 is 7.8 meters long. Parts of the slopes and protrusions were protected by river stones, similar to fukiishi. Archaeological excavations were conducted in 1979 and 1980. Yayoi pottery, both ceremonial and for everyday use, was found around the protruding portions, but the burial chambers were not excavated. Currently, the site is backfilled for preservation, and the excavated artifacts are stored in the Kurayoshi Museum.

The site is located a ten-minute walk from "Kamifukuda" bus stop on the Hinomaru Bus from Kurayoshi Station on the JR West San'in Main Line.

== See also ==
- List of Historic Sites of Japan (Tottori)
