= Kitayama Kofun =

- 北山古墳 (Japanese)
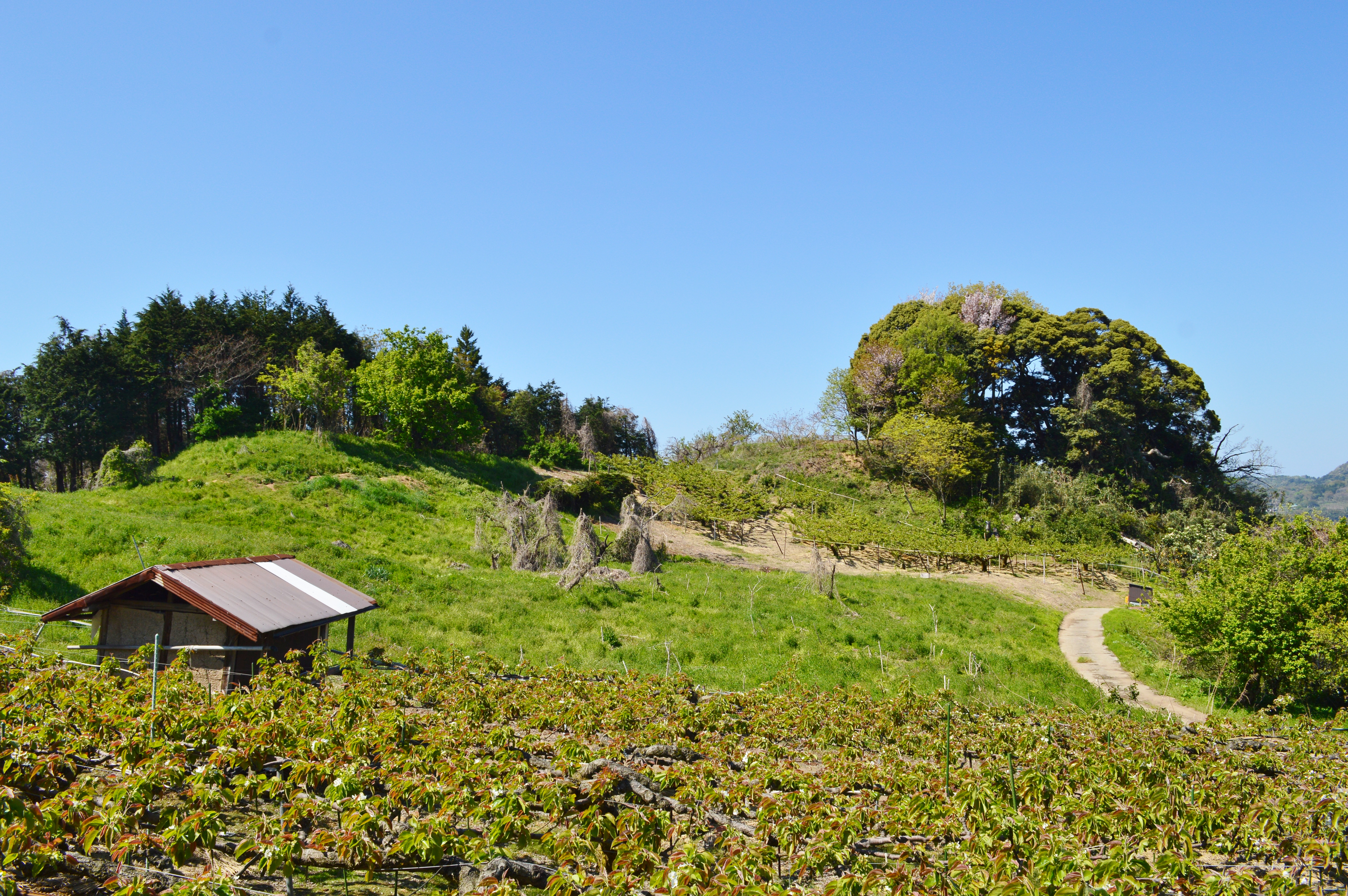
- Kitayama Kofun

- Kitayama Kofun Kitayama Kofun (Japan)
- Interactive map of Kitayama Kofun
- 35°27′50.72″N 133°53′6.56″E
- Type: kofun
- Periods: Kofun period
- Location: Yurihama, Tottori, Tottori Prefecture Japan
- Region: San'in region

History
- Built: early 5th century AD

Site notes
- Public access: Yes (no facilities)

The Kitayama Kofun (北山古墳) is a Kofun period burial mound located in the Nohana Kitayama neighborhood of the town of Yurihama, Tōhaku District, Tottori Prefecture in the San'in region of Japan. The tumulus was designated a National Historic Site of Japan in 1980. It is the largest burial mound in Tottori Prefecture and is estimated to have been built in the first half of the 5th century (middle of the Kofun period).

== Overview ==
The area around Lake Tōgō, located in the central part of Tottori Prefecture, is an area where many of the largest burial mounds in the San'in region are located and was a center of Kofun period culture. Located near the tip of the Kitayama hills that extend along the southern shore of Lake Tōgō, The Kitayama Kofun is the largest keyhole-shaped tumulus in the San'in region, with a total length of 110 meters, and is orientated to the west-southwest. It is a zenpō-kōen-fun (前方後円墳), which is shaped like a keyhole, having one square end and one circular end, when viewed from above. During an archaeological excavation in 1966, a pit-style stone burial chamber was confirmed in the posterior circular portion; this chamber had a 6.2-meter-long, 4.4-meter-wide gravel bed and a drainage ditch, but had been robbed in antiquity and no artifacts were discovered. There was a second burial in a stone sarcophagus two meters to the south of the burial chamber. This sarcophagus measures 1.7 meters in length, 0.5 meters in width, and 0.5 meters in depth and was intact. In addition to human bones, many grave goods such as bronze mirror, iron swords, and magatama were excavated. A third possible burial location was found three meters north of the burial chamber and a number of artifacts were recovered from this spot. On the exterior of the tumulus, many fragments of various haniwa (cylindrical, figurative, "morning-glory" shaped, etc.) from the early middle Kofun period were excavated from the mound, along with fukiishi and it is estimated that the tumulus was built around the beginning of the middle Kofun period.

The site is located about five minutes by car from Matsuzaki Station on the JR West San'in Main Line.

Overall length
110 meters
Posterior circular portion
70 meter diameter x 12 meters high
Anterior rectangular portion
62 meters long x 5.5 to 9.5meters high
"neck" portion
43 meters wide

== See also ==
- List of Historic Sites of Japan (Tottori)
