= List of historic sites of Japan (Tottori) =

This list is of the historic sites of Japan located within the Prefecture of Tottori.

== National Historic Sites ==
As of 3 January 2026, thirty-seven Sites have been designated as being of national significance (including one *Special Historic Site); the San'indō spans the prefectural borders with Shimane.

| Site | Municipality | Comments | Image | Coordinates | Type | Ref. |
|---|---|---|---|---|---|---|
| *Sainoo temple ruins 斎尾廃寺跡; Sainoo Haiji ato | Kotoura | Asuka period temple ruins | | 35°28′54″N 133°42′41″E | 3 | |
| Amidaji Kofun Cluster 阿弥大寺古墳群; Amidaji kofun-gun | Kurayoshi | Kofun period tumulus cluster | | 35°25′24″N 133°45′13″E | 1 | |
| Ifukibe no Tokotari grave 伊福吉部徳足比売墓跡; Ifukibe Tokotari hime no haka ato | Tottori | Asuka period court lady's grave | | 35°28′54″N 134°16′30″E | 7 | |
| Inaba Provincial Capital ruins 因幡国庁跡; Inaba koku-chō ato | Tottori | Nara-Heian period provincial capital ruins | | 35°28′31″N 134°15′57″E | 2 | |
| Kajiyama Kofun 梶山古墳; Kajiyama kofun | Tottori | painted Kofun | | 35°27′05″N 134°17′41″E | 1 | |
| Iwai temple ruins Pagoda Site 岩井廃寺塔跡; Iwai Haiji tō ato | Iwami | Hakuho period temple ruins | | 35°33′25″N 134°22′08″E | 3 | |
| Hashizu Kofun Cluster 橋津古墳群; Hashizu kofun-gun | Yurihama | Kofun period tumuli cluster | | 35°30′16″N 133°52′55″E | 1 | |
| Mukoeyama Kofun Cluster 向山古墳群; Mukoeyama kofun-gun | Yonago | Kofun period tumuli cluster | | 35°30′16″N 133°52′55″E | 1 | |
| Mukibanda Site 妻木晩田遺跡; Mukoeyama kofun-gun | Yonago/Daizen | Yayoi period settlement ruins | | 35°27′40″N 133°27′21″E | 1 | |
| Mount Mitoku 三徳山; Mitoku-san | Misasa | also a Place of Scenic Beauty; the Nagaire-dō of Sanbutsu-ji is a National Treasure | | 35°23′51″N 133°57′30″E | 3 | |
| Sanmyōji Kofun 三明寺古墳; Sanmyōji kofun | Kurayoshi | Kofun period tumulus | | 35°26′27″N 133°49′56″E | 1 | |
| Wakasa Oniga Castle ruins 若桜鬼ヶ城跡; Wakasa Oniga-jō ato | Wakasa | Sengoku period castle ruins | | 35°20′17″N 134°23′49″E | 2 | |
| Kamiyodo temple ruins 上淀廃寺跡; Kamiyodo Haiji ato | Yonago | Asuka period temple ruins | | 35°27′16″N 133°26′46″E | 3 | |
| Aoyakamiji Site 青谷上寺地遺跡; Aoyakamiji chiiseki | Tottori | Yayoi period settlement traces | | 35°30′51″N 133°59′35″E | 1 | |
| Aoki Site 青木遺跡; Aoki iseki | Yonago | Yayoi period settlement trace | | 35°23′52″N 133°22′05″E | 1 | |
| Senjōsan Temporary Palace Site 船上山行宮跡; Senjōsan angū ato | Kotoura | Kamakura period ruins | | 35°25′27″N 133°35′11″E | 2, 3 | |
| Ōhara temple ruins Pagoda Site 大原廃寺塔跡; Ōhara Haiji tō ato | Kurayoshi | Asuka period temple ruis | | 35°25′13″N 133°51′30″E | 3 | |
| Ōmidō temple ruins 大御堂廃寺跡; Ōmidō Haiji ato | Kurayoshi | Asuka period temple ruins | | 35°25′53″N 133°50′18″E | 3 | |
| Ōtaka Kanga ruins 大高野官衙遺跡; Ōtaka no kanga iseki | Kotoura | Heian period local government office ruins | | 35°29′43″N 133°41′34″E | 2 | |
| Chizu Road-Shitosaka Pass 智頭往来 志戸坂峠越; Chizu-ōrai Shitosaka-tōgekoe | Chizu | ancient highway traces | | 35°12′33″N 134°19′43″E | 6 | |
| Tottori Castle Site 鳥取城跡附太閤ヶ平; Tottori-jō ato tsuketari Taikōganaru | Tottori | Edo period castle | | 35°30′37″N 134°14′30″E | 2 | |
| Tottori Domain Ikeda clan cemetery 鳥取藩主池田家墓所; Tottori-han-shu Ikeda-ke bosho | Tottori | Edo period daimyō cemetery | | 35°29′04″N 134°16′10″E | 7 | |
| Tottori Domain Battery Sites 鳥取藩台場跡; Tottori-han daiba ato | Sakaiminato, Hokuei, Yurihama, Yonago, Iwami | Bakumatsu period fortifications; designation includes the sites of the Yura (由良台場跡), Sakai (境台場跡), Yodoe (淀江台場跡), Hashizu (橋津台場跡), and Uratomi (浦富台場跡) Batteries | | 35°30′20″N 133°52′23″E | 2 | |
| Hajimomoi temple ruins 土師百井廃寺跡; Hajimomoi Haiji ato | Yazu | Asuka period temple ruins | | 35°24′26″N 134°13′54″E | 3 | |
| Tochimoto temple ruins 栃本廃寺跡; Tochimoto Haiji ato | Tottori | Asuka period temple ruins | | 35°28′16″N 134°22′15″E | 3 | |
| Hōki Ichinomiya Sutra Mound 伯耆一宮経塚; Hōki Ichinomiya kyōzuka | Yurihama | Heian period sutra mount with excavated artifacts designated a National Treasure | | 35°29′21″N 133°54′14″E | 3 | |
| Hōki Provincial Capital ruins 伯耆国府跡; Hōki kokufu ato | Kurayoshi | designation includes the sites of the Hōki Provincial Offices (国庁跡), Hokkeji-bata Site (法華寺畑遺跡), and Funioka Site (不入岡遺跡) | | 35°25′55″N 133°47′07″E | 2 | |
| Hōki Kokunbun-ji ruins 伯耆国分寺跡; Hōki Kokunbunji ato | Kurayoshi | Nara period provincial temple of Hōki Province | | 35°25′57″N 133°47′23″E | 3 | |
| Fuse Kofun 布勢古墳; Fuse kofun | Tottori | Kofun period tumulus | | 35°30′19″N 134°10′38″E | 1 | |
| Fukuichi Site 福市遺跡; Fukuichi iseki | Yonago | Yayoi - Kofun period settlement trace | | 35°24′10″N 133°22′04″E | 1 | |
| Yonago Castle Site 米子城跡; Yonago-jō ato | Yonago | Edo period castle ruins | | 35°25′29″N 133°19′27″E | 2 | |
| Kitayama Kofun 北山古墳; Kitayama kofun | Yurihama | Kofun period tumulus | | 35°27′51″N 133°53′04″E | 1 | |
| San'indō 山陰道; San'indō | Iwami | remains of the Edo-period road; designation includes the Kamō Pass (蒲生峠越), Toku-jō Pass (徳城峠越), and Nosaka Pass (野坂峠越), and an area of Tsuwano in Shimane Prefecture | | 35°31′23″N 134°24′23″E | 6 | |
| Daisen-ji Old Precinct 大山寺旧境内; Daisenji kyū-keidai | Daisen | | | 35°23′28″N 133°32′06″E | 3 | |
| Odaka Castle Site 尾高城跡; Odaka-jō ato | Yonago | | | 35°25′16″N 133°24′44″E | 2 | |
| Inaba Province San'indō Site 因幡国山陰道跡; Inaba-no-kuni San'in-dō ato | Tottori | | | | | |
| Ueshi - Jūmanji - Banjiro Castle Sites 羽衣石城跡 附 十万寺城跡 番城城跡; Ueshi-jō ato tsuketari Jūmanji-jō ato Banjiro-jō ato | Yurihama | | | 35°26′14″N 133°53′55″E | 2 | |

== Prefectural Historic Sites ==
As of 1 May 2025, twenty Sites have been designated as being of prefectural importance.

| Site | Municipality | Comments | Image | Coordinates | Type | Ref. |
|---|---|---|---|---|---|---|
| Sorayama No. 2 Kofun 空山２号古墳; Sorayama ni-gō kofun | Tottori | | | 35°26′31″N 134°14′32″E | | |
| Sorayama No. 10 Kofun 空山10号古墳; Sorayama jū-gō kofun | Tottori | | | 35°26′31″N 134°14′32″E | | |
| Sorayama No. 15 Kofun 空山15号古墳; Sorayama jūgo-gō kofun | Tottori | | | 35°26′31″N 134°14′32″E | | |
| Sorayama No. 16 Kofun 空山16号古墳; Sorayama jūroku-gō kofun | Tottori | | | 35°26′31″N 134°14′32″E | | |
| Bōgazuka Kofun 坊ヶ塚古墳; Bōgazuka kofun | Tottori | | | 35°27′00″N 134°14′48″E | | |
| Yamagahana Kofun 山ヶ鼻古墳; Yamagahana kofun | Tottori | | | 35°29′26″N 134°11′58″E | | |
| Fukuba Kofun 福庭古墳; Fukuba kofun | Kurayoshi | | | 35°27′55″N 133°51′15″E | | |
| Sagiyama Kofun 鷺山古墳; Sagiyama kofun | Tottori | | | 35°28′46″N 134°16′45″E | | |
| Akoyama No. 22 Kofun 阿古山２２号古墳; Akoyama nijūni-gō kofun | Tottori | | | 35°30′31″N 134°00′43″E | | |
| Idekamiiwa Kofun 出上岩屋古墳; Idekamiiwa kofun | Kotoura | | | 35°30′08″N 133°37′35″E | | |
| Iwayanaru Kofun 岩屋平ル古墳; Iwayanaru kofun | Daisen | | | 35°30′10″N 133°35′50″E | | |
| Takata No. 26 Tumulus 高田２６号墳; Takata nijūroku-gō fun | Daisen | | | 35°28′28″N 133°28′47″E | | |
| Ishizuka Haiji Pagoda Site 石塚廃寺塔跡; Ishizuka Haiji tō ato | Kurayoshi | | | 35°23′52″N 133°46′41″E | | |
| Tenjinyama Castle Site 天神山城跡; Tenjinyama-jō ato | Tottori | | | 35°30′35″N 134°10′35″E | | |
| Dainichiji Kofun Cluster 大日寺古墓群; Dainichiji kofun-gun | Kurayoshi | | | 35°25′30″N 133°42′39″E | | |
| Kaneda Tile Kiln Site 金田瓦窯跡; Kaneda kawara kama ato | Nanbu | | | 35°20′53″N 133°22′40″E | | |
| Futagamiyama Castle Site 二上山城跡; Futagamiyama-jō ato | Iwami | | | 35°32′26″N 134°19′09″E | | |
| Ueshi Castle Site 羽衣石城跡; Ueshi-jō ato | Yurihama | | | 35°26′14″N 133°53′54″E | | |
| Nii Mishima Valley Tumulus 新井三嶋谷墳丘墓; Nii Mishima-tani funkyū haka | Iwami | | | 35°33′46″N 134°20′05″E | | |
| Tsugōyama Tatara Site 都合山たたら跡; Tsugōyama tatara ato | Hino | | | 35°10′22″N 133°21′41″E | | |

== Municipal Historic Sites ==
As of 1 May 2025, a further one hundred and twenty Sites have been designated as being of municipal importance.

== See also ==
- Cultural Properties of Japan
- Hōki Province
- Inaba Province
- Tottori Prefectural Museum
- List of Cultural Properties of Japan - paintings (Tottori)
- List of Places of Scenic Beauty of Japan (Tottori)
