= Sanmyōji Kofun =

- 三明寺古墳 (Japanese)
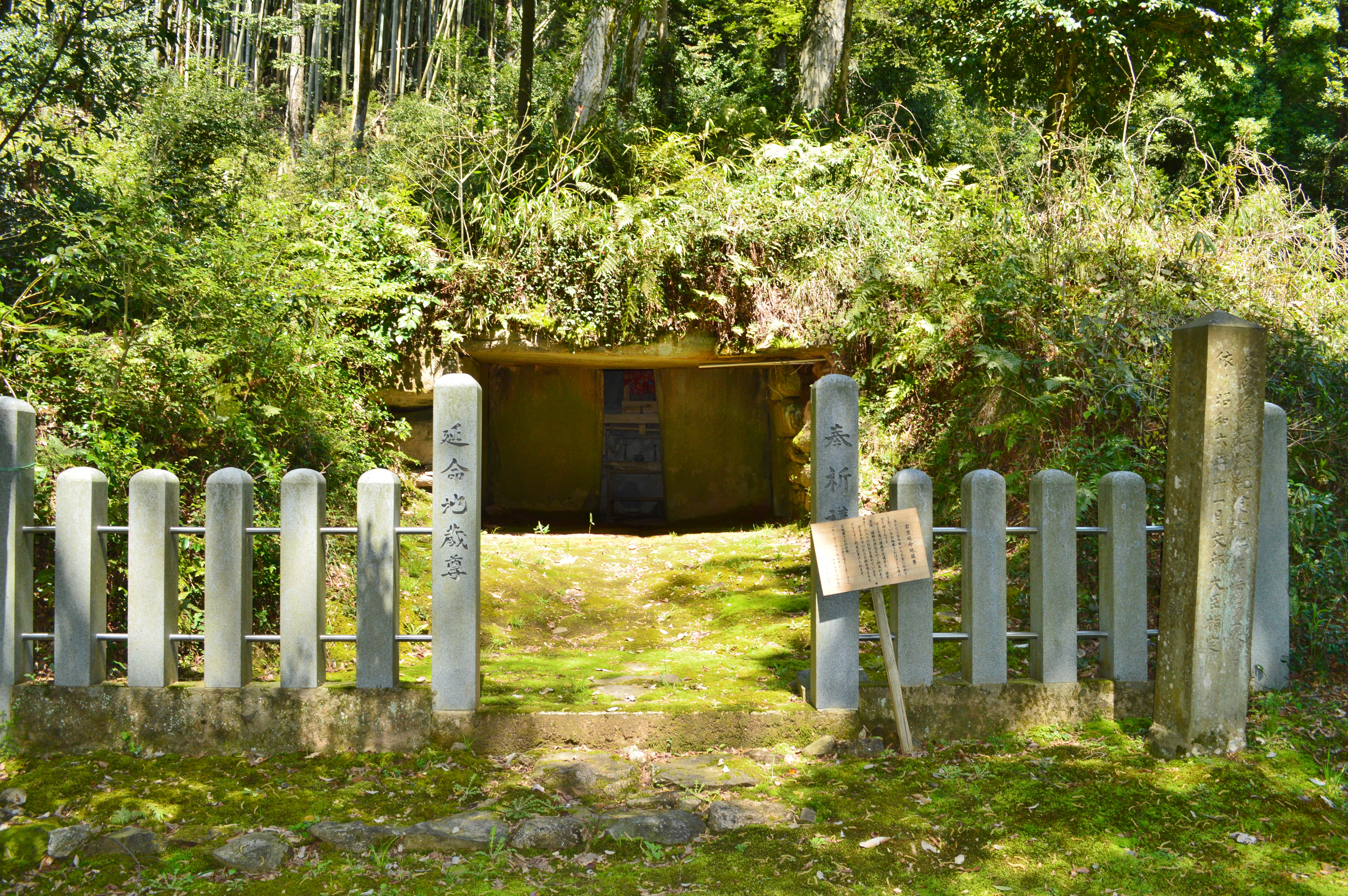
- Sanmyōji Kofun entry

- Sanmyōji Kofun Sanmyōji Kofun (Japan)
- Interactive map of Sanmyōji Kofun
- 35°26′27.30″N 133°49′55.95″E
- Type: kofun
- Periods: Kofun period
- Location: Kurayoshi, Tottori, Tottori Prefecture Japan
- Region: San'in region

History
- Built: late 6th to early 7th century AD

Site notes
- Public access: Yes (no facilities)

The Sanmyōji Kofun (三明寺古墳) is a Kofun period burial mound located in the Iwaojō neighborhood of the city of Kurayoshi, Tottori Prefecture in the San'in region of Japan. The tumulus was designated a National Historic Site of Japan in 1931. One of the burial mounds in the Mukaiyama Kofun Cluster.

== Overview ==
The Sanmyōji Kofun is located on the south side of the Mukaiyama Hills that spreads out to the north of central Kurayoshi. It is believed to be an empun (円墳)-style circular mound, although it has been scraped away and deformed and may possibly have originally been a hōfun (方墳)-style square mound, or even polygonal-shaped. It has a diameter of 18 meters and a height of six meters. The stone burial chamber is 8.3 meters in length, 3.7 meters in depth, and 3.1 meters in height with a huge monolith forming the rear wall. In addition, there is an enclosure made of stone slabs adjacent to the back wall of the burial chamber. This antechamber construction is more commonly found in the Kyushu region of Japan. At the time of construction, it is presumed that there was a cover stone on top of the stone enclosure, and that the floor was covered with small pebbles. The burial chamber is known to have been open since ancient times, so no grave goods have been recovered. Based on the structure of the stone chamber, the tumulus is believed to have been built around the end of the 6th century or the beginning of the 7th century, or at the end of the Kofun period.

The tumulus is located a ten-minute car from Kurayoshi Station on the JR West San'in Main Line.

== Gallery ==
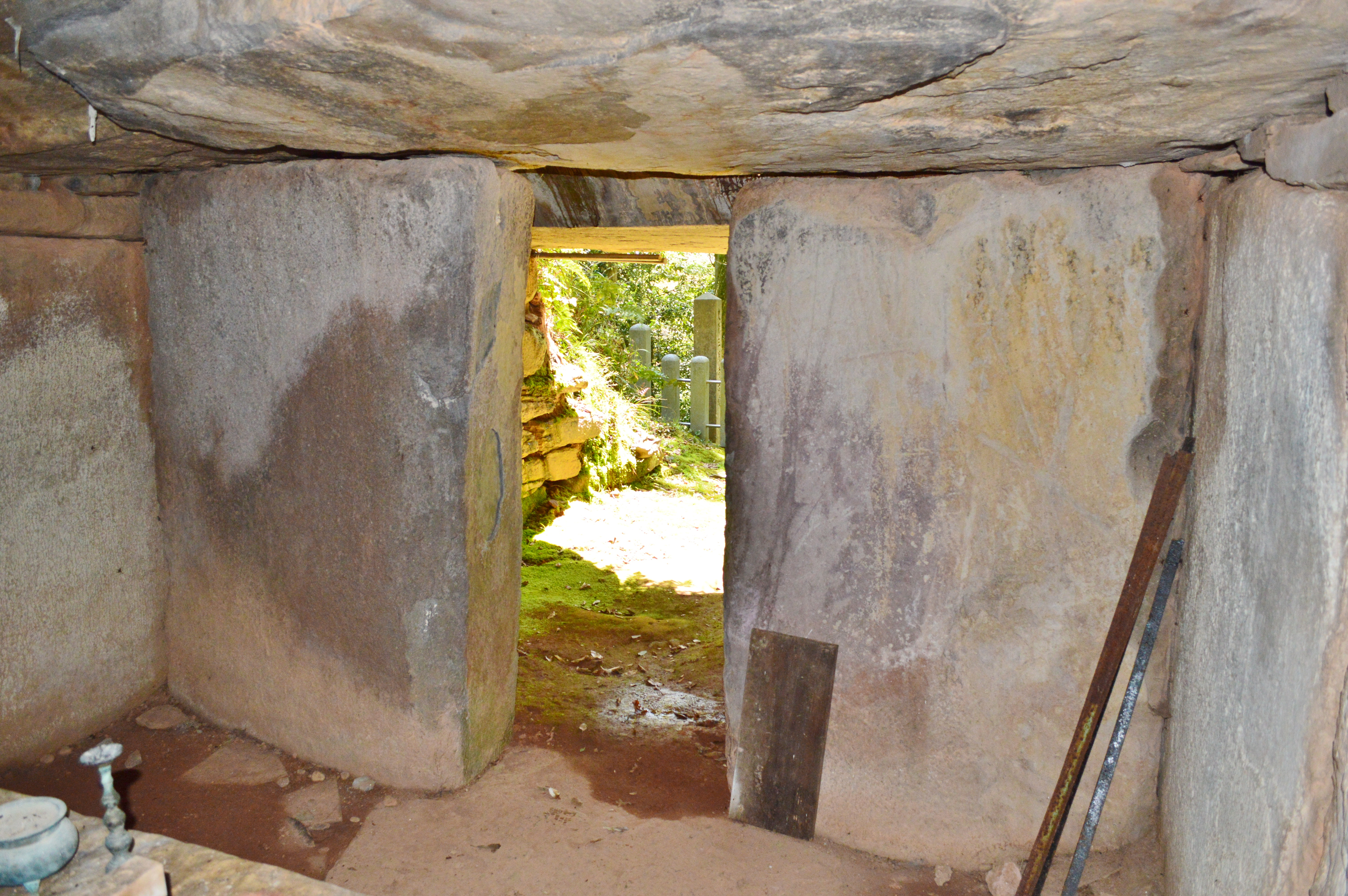
Entry

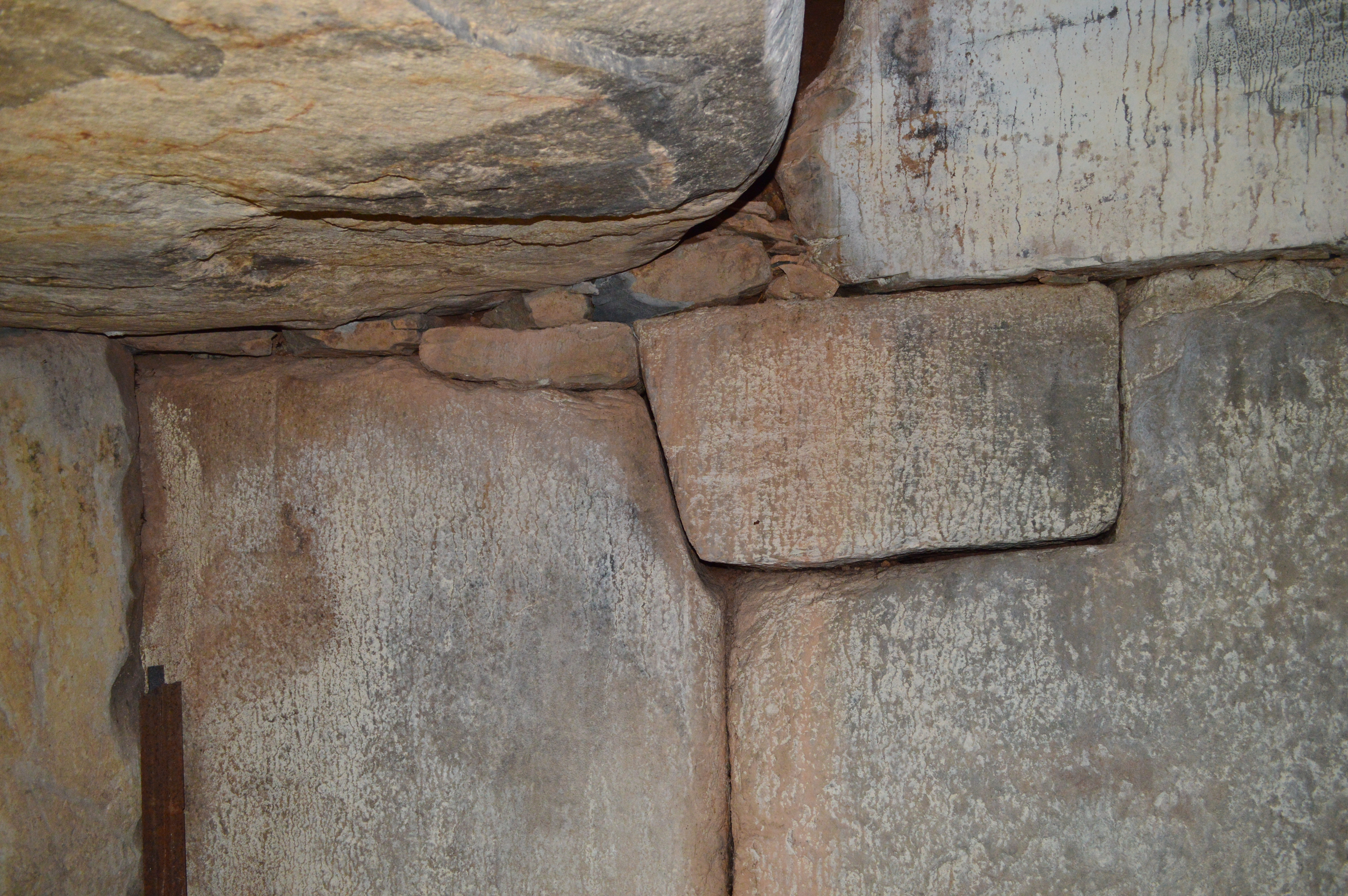
Burial chamber construction

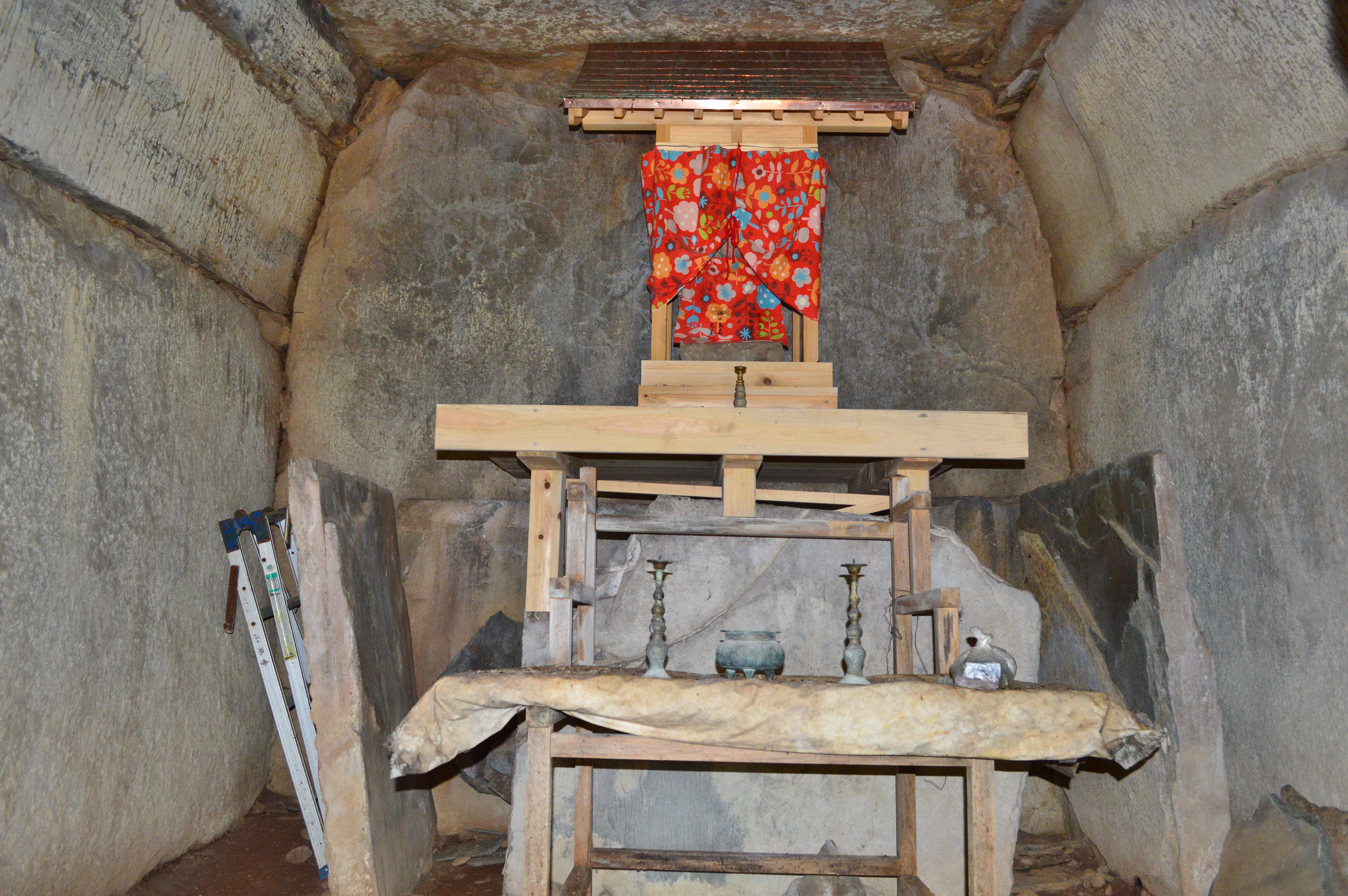
'Monolithic rear wall and remnants of sarcophagus

== See also ==
- List of Historic Sites of Japan (Tottori)
