= Hōki Kokunbun-ji =

Japanese Buddhist Temple

Hōki Kokubun-ji 伯耆国分寺
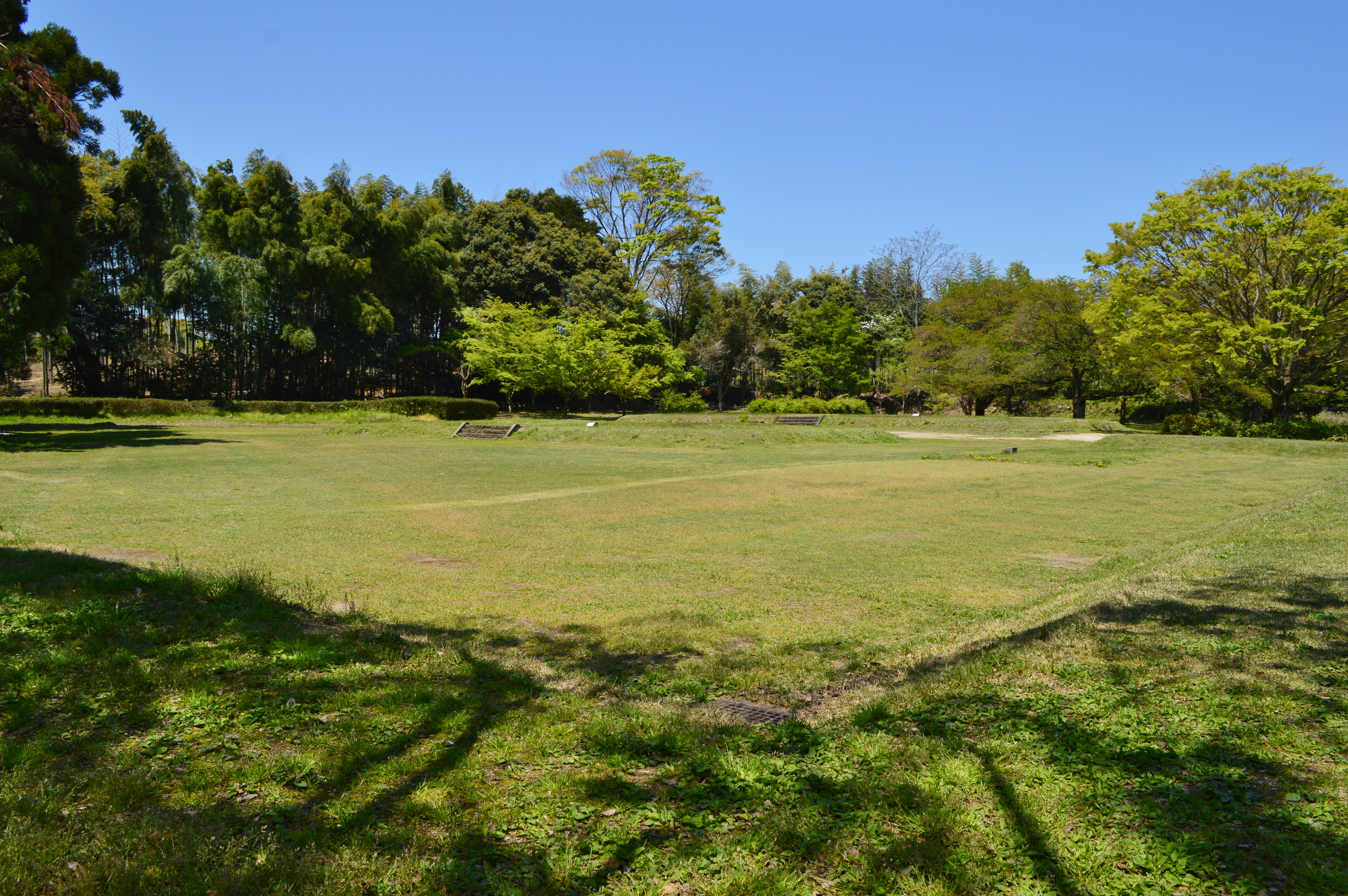
- Hōki Kokubun-ji

- Hōki Kokubun-ji Hōki Kokunbun-ji (Japan)

Religion
- Affiliation: Buddhist
- Rite: Shingon

Location
- Location: Kurayoshi, Tottori
- Country: Japan
- Coordinates: 35°25′57.2″N 133°47′23.3″E

Architecture
- Founder: Emperor Shōmu
- Completed: c.741
- National Historic Site of Japan

Hōki Kokubun-ji (伯耆国分寺) was a Buddhist temple located in the Kokubunji neighborhood of the city of Kurayoshi, Tottori, Tottori Prefecture, Japan. It was one of the provincial temples established by decree of Emperor Shōmu during the Nara period (710 – 794). The temple longer exists, but its ruins were designated as a National Historic Site in 1974.

== History ==
The Shoku Nihongi records that in 741, as the country recovered from a major smallpox epidemic, Emperor Shōmu ordered that a monastery and nunnery be established in every province, the kokubunji (国分寺). These temples were built to a semi-standardized template, and served both to spread Buddhist orthodoxy to the provinces, and to emphasize the power of the Nara period centralized government under the Ritsuryō system.

Hōki Kokubun-ji was located on a hill on the left bank of the Kokufu River. Roof tiles have been found at the end of the hill for many years, and fragments of earthen walls and moats remained on the west and north sides of the temple precincts, so it was known that it this was the site of Hōki Kokubun-ji since ancient times. Modern archaeological excavations revealed that the Nara-period temple complex measured 182 meters from east-to-west and 160 meters from north-to-south. It was surrounded by moats and an earthen rampart. The style of roof tiles used at time of construction have a unique pattern not found in other temples in the area, The foundation stones for structures such as the South Gate, Main Hall, and Lecture Hall were found in the western part of the temple area, and the remains of a Pagoda near the southeast corner were confirmed. The temple was destroyed by fire in 948.

The site is currently maintained as an archaeological park and is adjacent to the ruins of the Hōki Provincial Capital ruins.

== See also ==
- List of Historic Sites of Japan (Tottori)
- provincial temple
