= Hōki Provincial Capital =

Hōki Provincial Capital Site
- 伯耆国庁跡 (Japanese)
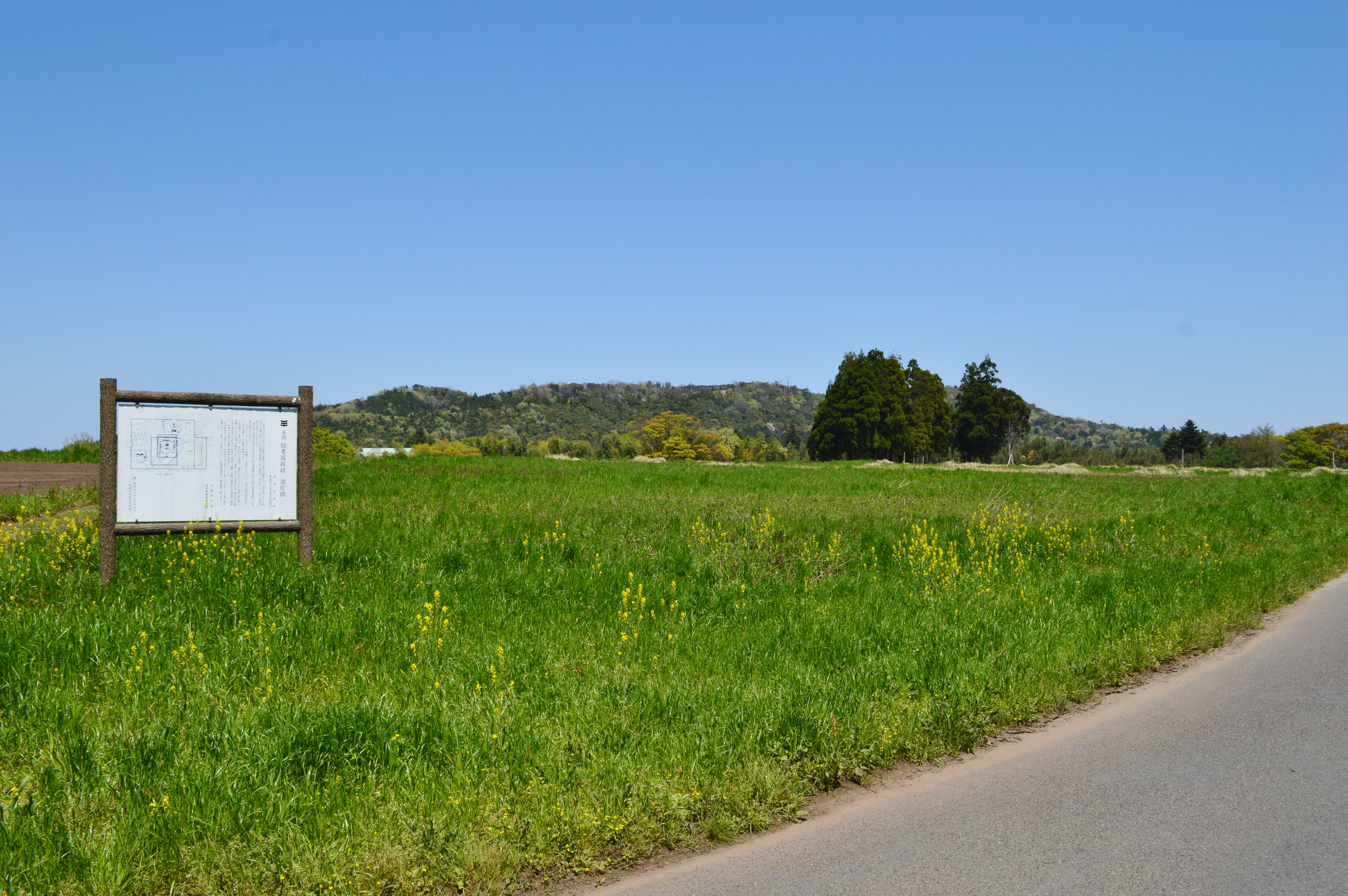
- Hōki Provincial Capital Site

- Hōki Provincial Capital Site Hōki Provincial Capital (Japan)
- 35°28′30.4″N 134°15′58.0″E
- Type: Kokufu ruin
- Location: Kurayoshi, Tottori, Japan
- Region: San'in region

History
- Built: Heian period

Site notes
- Condition: ruins
- Public access: Yes (park and museum)

The Hōki Provincial Capital Site (伯耆国庁跡, Hōki Kokucho ato) is an archaeological site consisting of the ruins of the Nara period to early Heian period Provincial Capital of Hōki Province, located in the Kokufu, Kokubunji, neighborhood of the city of Tottori, Tottori Prefecture in the San'in region of Japan. The site was designated a National Historic Site of Japan in 1985 with the area under production expanded in 2000.

== Overview ==
Following the Taika Reform (645 AD) which aimed at a centralization of the administration following the Chinese model (ritsuryō), provincial capitals were established in the various provinces, headed by an official titled kokushi, who replaced the older Kuni no miyatsuko. With a square layout, the provincial capitals were patterned after the Capital of Japan, first Fujiwara-kyō and then Heijō-kyō, which in turn were modelled on the Tang capital Chang'an, but on a much, much smaller scale. Each had office buildings for administration, finance, police and military and the official building of the governor, as well as granaries for tax rice and other taxable produce. In the periphery there was the provincial temple (kokubun-ji), and nunnery (kokubun-niji) and the garrison. This system collapsed with the growth of feudalism in the Late Heian period, and the location of many of the provincial capitals is now lost.

The Hōki Provincial Capital was located on a hill with an elevation of about 40 meters, on the western outskirts of Kurayoshi city. On the east side of the same hill are the Hōki Kokunbun-ji ruins and the provincial nunnery ruins, and the area is thought to have been the political, economic, and cultural center of Hōki Province at the time. Archaeological excavations beginning in 1969 and continued from 1973 through 1978 confirmed that the site measures 273 meters from east-to-west, 227 meters from north-to-south, and was surrounded by two-meter wide moats on all sides, and that it was divided into an inner enclosure (government area) where ceremonies were held and an outer enclosure (kanga area) where practical work was conducted. In addition, the east side had an overhang of 51 meters east-to-west and 149 meters north-to-south with rice fields. The inner enclosure had a south gate, front hall, main hall, and rear hall, while the outer enclosure has several buildings on the north and west sides, and had been rebuilt four times between the late 8th century and the 10th century.

In 1971, the foundations of a large building were excavated along with a large amount of roof tiles and wooden strips. There is a theory that it was the site of Kokubun-niji Temple and another theory that it was the site of some kind of government office attached to the national government office. Named the Hokkejibata site (法華寺畑遺跡) was added to the National Historic Site designation in 2000.

Also, in 1993, ten huge dug-standing pillar buildings were excavated in the Funioka neighborhood of Kurayoshi, on a separate site measuring 40 meters east-to-west and 150 meters north-to-south. This site is believed to have been a group of warehouses for collection of taxes. This Funioka site (不入岡遺跡) was added to the National Historic Site designation in 2000.

The site is currently maintained as a historical park.

== See also ==
- List of Historic Sites of Japan (Tottori)
