= Ifukube no Tokotari =

Ifukube no Tokotari 伊福吉部徳足
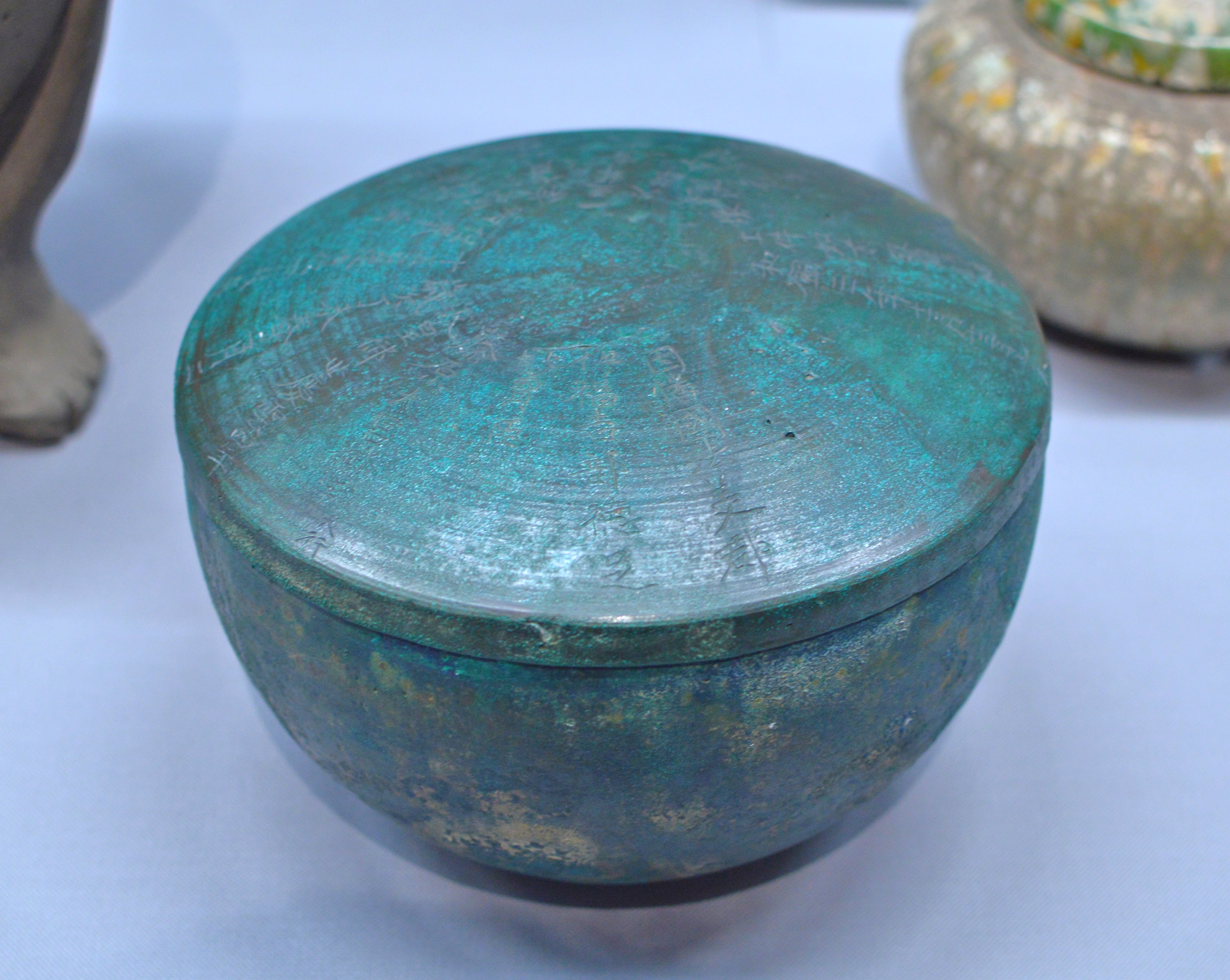
- funerary urn of Ifukube no Tokotari
- Born: unknown Inaba Province, Japan
- Died: 708 AD; Fujiwara-kyo, Japan

Ifukube no Tokotari-hime (伊福吉部徳足比売) (year of birth unknown - July 22, 708 AD), was a woman in Asuka period Japan. Her name is also transliterated as "Ifukibe" or "Iokibe". She served as a maid of honor (uneme) in the court of Emperor Mommu and held the court rank of Junior Seventh Rank, Lower Grade. Her inscription and epitaph engraved on her cremation urn containing her ashes is one of the 16 surviving gold and stone inscriptions from before the Nara period. Her gravesite in the city of Tottori was designated as a National Historic Site in 1924.

Ifukube no Tokotari was the daughter of the kuni no miyatsuko of Inaba Province. That title was held by the local Ifukube clan, and based on the date of her death, it is assumed that she was either the daughter of Ifukube Tsumuji or his son, Ifukube Kunitari. Nothing is known of her life other than that she was promoted to the rank of Junior Seventh Rank, Lower Grade in 707. This was rare for a daughter of a provincial aristocrat. She died of illness in Fujiwara-kyo in 708. After three years of mourning, her body was cremated in 711, the practice of which was just gaining in popularity with the spread of Buddhism.

Her cenotaph and burial mound was discovered in 1774 on a hillside behind the temple of Muryoko-ji in Tottori. The tumulus contained a stone ossuary caved from two blocks of tuff, 86-cm wide by 47-cm thick, and contained an funerary urn made of cast copper with a height of 16.5-cm and diameter of 26.4-cm. The lid had an inscription consisting of 16 lines with 108 kanji giving a few details of her career and the funeral process. At the time of its discovery, it is said that there was something like ashes in the container. This burial vessel is currently stored at the Tokyo National Museum and is designated a National [Important Cultural Property. The epitaph are the oldest characters discovered in former Inaba Province.

== See also ==
- List of Historic Sites of Japan (Tottori)
