= Inaba Province =

Former province of Japan

Map of Japanese provinces (1868) with Inaba Province highlighted

Inaba Province (因幡国, Inaba no Kuni; Japanese pronunciation: [í.nä̀.bä̀ (nò̞ kɯ̈̀.ɲ̟ì)]) was a former province in the area that is today the eastern half of Tottori Prefecture in the San'in region of Japan. Inaba was bordered by Hōki, Mimasaka, Harima and Tajima Provinces. Its abbreviated form name was Inshū (因州). In terms of the Gokishichidō system, Inaba was one of the provinces of the San'indo circuit. Under the Engishiki classification system, Inaba was ranked as one of the 35 "superior countries" (上国) in terms of importance, and one of the "near countries" (近国) in terms of distance from the capital. The provincial capital was located in what is now the city of Tottori. The ichinomiya of the province is the Ube shrine also located in the city of Tottori.

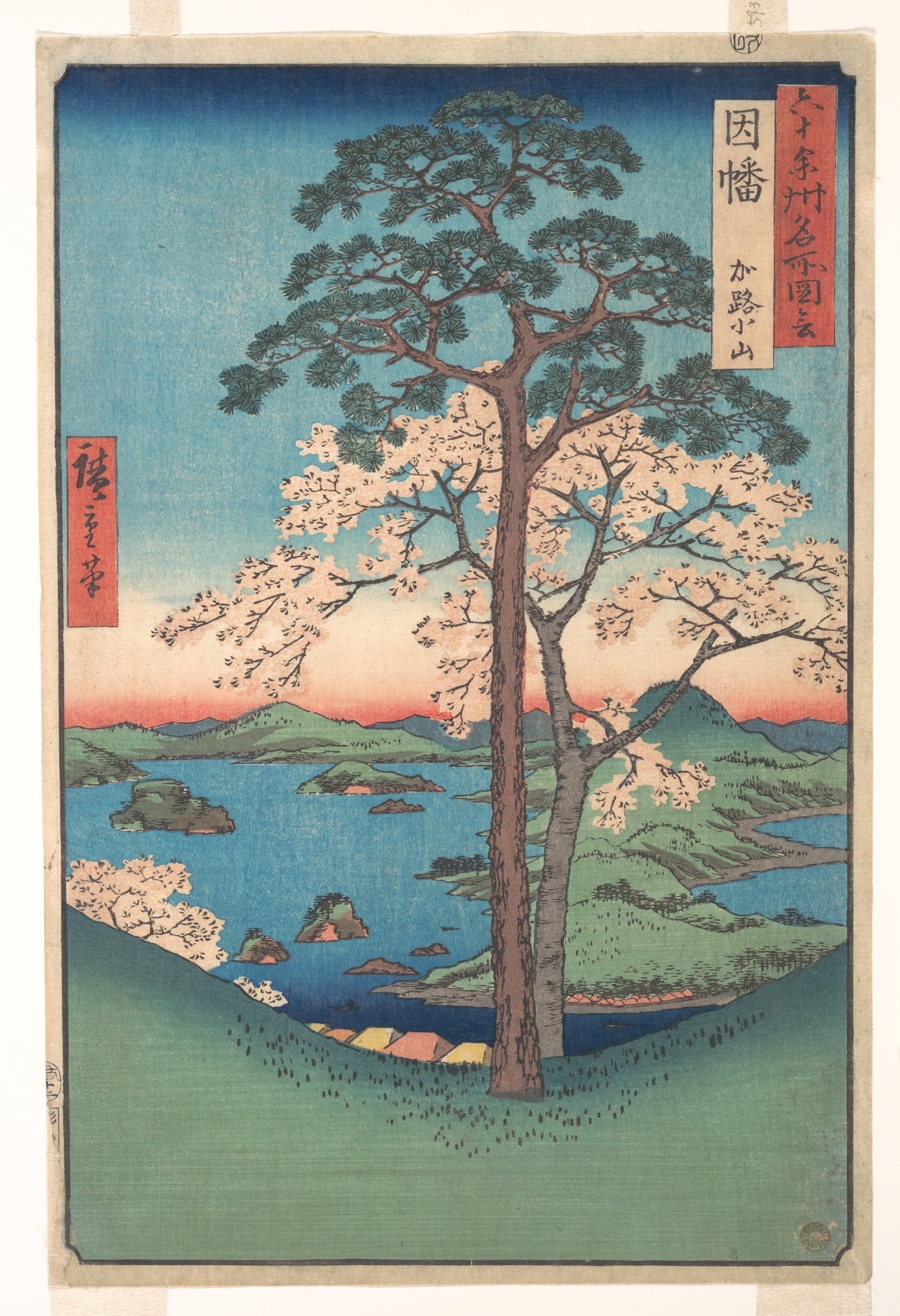
Hiroshige ukiyo-e "Inaba" in "The Famous Scenes of the Sixty States" (六十余州名所図会), depicting Kajikoyama

== History ==
"Inaba" has been written in a variety of kanji. The ancient Kojiki uses "稲羽", whereas the Kujiki uses "稲葉" to name only a couple of examples. Inaba has been settled since the Japanese Paleolithic and the remains of Yayoi and Kofun period settlements and burial mounds have been found in several locations. During the late Kofun period to Asuka period, the Inaba kuni no miyatsuko was the Ifukube clan. A princess from this clan (Ifukube no Tokotari) served as maid of honor at the court of Emperor Mommu and her grave in what is now the city of Tottori is a National Historic Site. During the Muromachi period, the Yamana clan were nominally shugo of the province; however, their control over the province was very weak, and local warlords and aggressive neighbors often usurped Yamana authority. In the Sengoku period, the province was a contested area between the Mōri clan and Oda Nobunaga, with Nobunaga's general, Hashiba Hideyoshi eventually seizing control. In the Edo period, the entire province was ruled by a branch of the Ikeda clan as part of the 320,000 koku Tottori Domain centered on Tottori Castle.

Following the Meiji restoration and the abolition of the han system in 1871, Inaba became part of Tottori Prefecture on August 29,1871. However, Tottori was merged into Shimane Prefecture on August 21, 1876. It was separated back out on September 12, 1881.

Per the early Meiji period Kyudaka kyuryo Torishirabe-chō (旧高旧領取調帳), an official government assessment of the nation’s resources, the province had 565 villages with a total kokudaka of 193,336 koku.

Bakumatsu period domains
| Name | Clan | Type | kokudaka |
|---|---|---|---|
| Tottori | Ikeda clan | Shinpan equivalent | 320,000 koku |

Districts of Inaba Province
| District | kokudaka | Villages | |Notes | |
|---|---|---|---|---|
| Chizu District (智頭郡) | 16,613 koku | 98 villages | Chizu, part of Tottori | merged with Hattō and Yakami Districts to become Yazu District (八頭郡) on March 29, 1896 |
| Hattō District (八東郡) | 26,005 koku | 91 villages | Wakasa, Yazu | merged with Chizu and Yakami Districts to become Yazu District on March 29, 1896 |
| Hōmi District (法美郡) | 20,439 koku | 62 villages | Tottori | merged with Iwai and Ōmi Districts to become Iwami District (岩美郡) on March 29, 1896 |
| Iwai District (岩井郡) | 22,258 koku | 51 villages | Iwami | merged with Hōmi and Ōmi Districts to become Iwami District on March 29, 1896 |
| Keta District (気多郡) | 26,923 koku | 83 villages | Tottori | merged with Takakusa District to become Ketaka District (気高郡) on March 29, 1896 |
| Ōmi District (邑美郡) | 17,807 koku | 35 villages | Tottori | merged with Hōmi and Iwai Districts to become Iwami District on March 29, 1896 |
| Takakusa District (高草郡) | 39,865 koku | 82 villages | Tottori | merged with Keta District to become Ketaka District on March 29, 1896 |
| Yakami District (八上郡) | 23,423 koku | 63 villages | Tottori, part of Yazu | merged with Chizu and Hattō Districts to become Yazu District on March 29, 1896 |
