= San'in region =

Historical region of Japan

San'in region 山陰地方
- Region
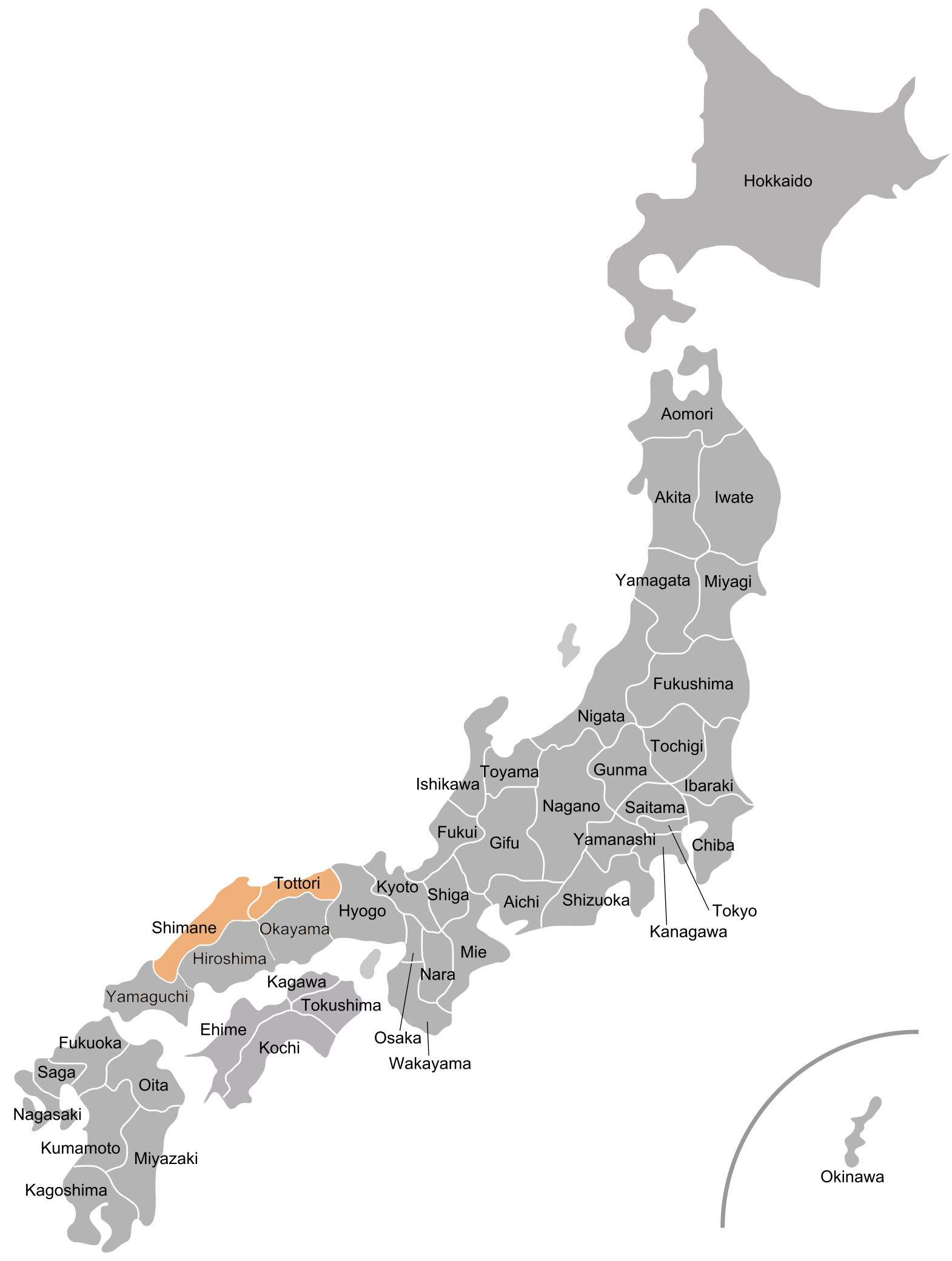
- Map of the San'in Region
- Country: Japan

Area
  - Total: 11,680.73 km^{2} (4,509.96 sq mi)

Population (1 October 2020)
  - Total: 1,240,143
  - Density: 106.1700/km^{2} (274.9790/sq mi)
- Time zone: UTC+9 (JST)

The San'in Region (山陰地方, San'in Chihō) is an area in the southwest of Honshū, the main island of Japan. It consists of the northern part of the Chūgoku region, facing the Sea of Japan. Specifically, it is the two prefectures of Shimane and Tottori.

== Etymology ==
The name San'in in the Japanese language is formed from two kanji characters. The first, 山, "mountain", and the second, 陰 represents the "yin" of yin and yang. The name means the northern, shady side of the mountains in contrast to the yang "southern, sunny" San'yō region to the south.

== History ==
=== Early history ===
The San'in region has numerous Paleolithic and Jōmon period (14,000 – 300 BC) remains, but its Yayoi period (300 BC – 250 AD) remains are the largest in Japan. The Mukibanda Yayoi remains in the low foothills of Mount Daisen in the cities of Daisen and Yonago, Tottori Prefecture are the largest in Japan. The site is still only partially excavated, but indicates that the San'in was a regional center of power in the period. The mythology of the Shinto religion is largely based in the Izumo area of the region, and the Izumo-taisha, or Izumo Grand Shrine in Izumo, Shimane Prefecture, is one of the most ancient and important Shinto shrines in Japan. The eastern part of Shimane Prefecture also had cultural and economic connections to the Asian mainland from an early period.

=== San'indō ===
The San'in region corresponds to San'indō (山陰道), one of the gokishichidō, or five provinces and seven circuits established in the Asuka period (538–710) under the Ritsuryō legal system. San'indō refers not only to the ancient geographic region, but also the main road through the region that connected it to the capital in Kyoto. The San'in encompassed the pre-Meiji provincial areas of Tanba, Tango, Tajima, Inaba, Hōki, Izumo, Iwami and Oki.

=== San'indō route ===
While the San'indō route was used for military logistics in numerous conflicts after the Asuka period, it more importantly served as a route for the transport of good to and from the region. The route reached its highest period of importance in the Edo period (1603–1867) when the Tokugawa shogunate formalized its route and shukuba post stations. The daimyō regional rulers used the San'indō for their sankin-kōtai mandatory journeys to Edo (modern Tokyo).

=== Modern usage ===
The San'in region now has no administrative authority. In modern Japanese usage it generally refers to the prefectures of Shimane, Tottori and northern area of Yamaguchi. The northern areas of Hyōgo and Kyōto prefectures are sometimes included in the region as well. Japan Route 9, the San'in Expressway, and the JR West San'in Main Line follow the historical route of the San'indō, and remnants of the shukuba, some well preserved, remain throughout the region.

== Geography ==
The San'in Region has a long coastline along the Japan Sea that dramatically sweeps south to the Chūgoku Mountains along the length of the region. The area is primarily mountainous with few plains. While the climate of the San'in region is not as harsh as that of the Hokuriku region to the north, winters are characterized by heavy snow and rainfall typical of areas on the Japan Sea.

== Demographics ==
The San'in subregion is a subregion of Chūgoku region that composes of the prefectures of Shimane, Tottori, and sometimes the northern portion of Yamaguchi Prefecture. The northern portion of Yamaguchi Prefecture composes of Abu, Hagi, and Nagato. The San'yo subregion is composed of the prefectures of Hiroshima, Okayama, and Yamaguchi in its entirety.

Per Japanese census data, and, San'in subregion has had continual negative population growth since 1992.

Historical population
Year	Pop.	±%
1920	1,170,000	—
1930	1,229,000	+5.0%
1940	1,225,000	−0.3%
1950	1,513,000	+23.5%
1960	1,488,000	−1.7%
1970	1,342,575	−9.8%
1980	1,388,795	+3.4%
1990	1,397,021	+0.6%
2000	1,374,792	−1.6%
2010	1,306,064	−5.0%
2020	1,240,143	−5.0%

== Economy ==
The San'in region is far from the industrial and cultural heartlands of Japan, and the region is consequently economically undeveloped compared to the other regions of Japan. The landscape remains rural and unindustrialized, and the urban areas of the region are decentralized. Tottori and Shimane are the least populated prefectures in Japan, and the population is aging at a rate faster than the rest of Japan. Cities in the region with a population of over 100,000 remain only the prefectural capitals of Tottori and Matsue, the more recently industrialized Yonago, and Izumo, a city formed from numerous smaller cities and villages after World War II. The agricultural output of the San'in region, however, remains very high. Its broad coastal and mountainous areas are protected as national, prefectural, and municipal parks, and these areas are now popular tourist destinations.

== Transportation ==
The San'in region is connected by several JR West rail lines and some highways, but transportation is relatively undeveloped compared to other regions of Japan. Projects to connect the region to the wider highway network of Japan continue.

== See also ==
- Gokishichidō
- Hokurikudō
- Nankaidō
- Saikaidō
- San'indō
- San'yōdō
- Tōkaidō
- Tōsandō
