= Hawai Onsen =

Hot spring in Yurihama, Tottori Prefecture, Japan

- はわい温泉
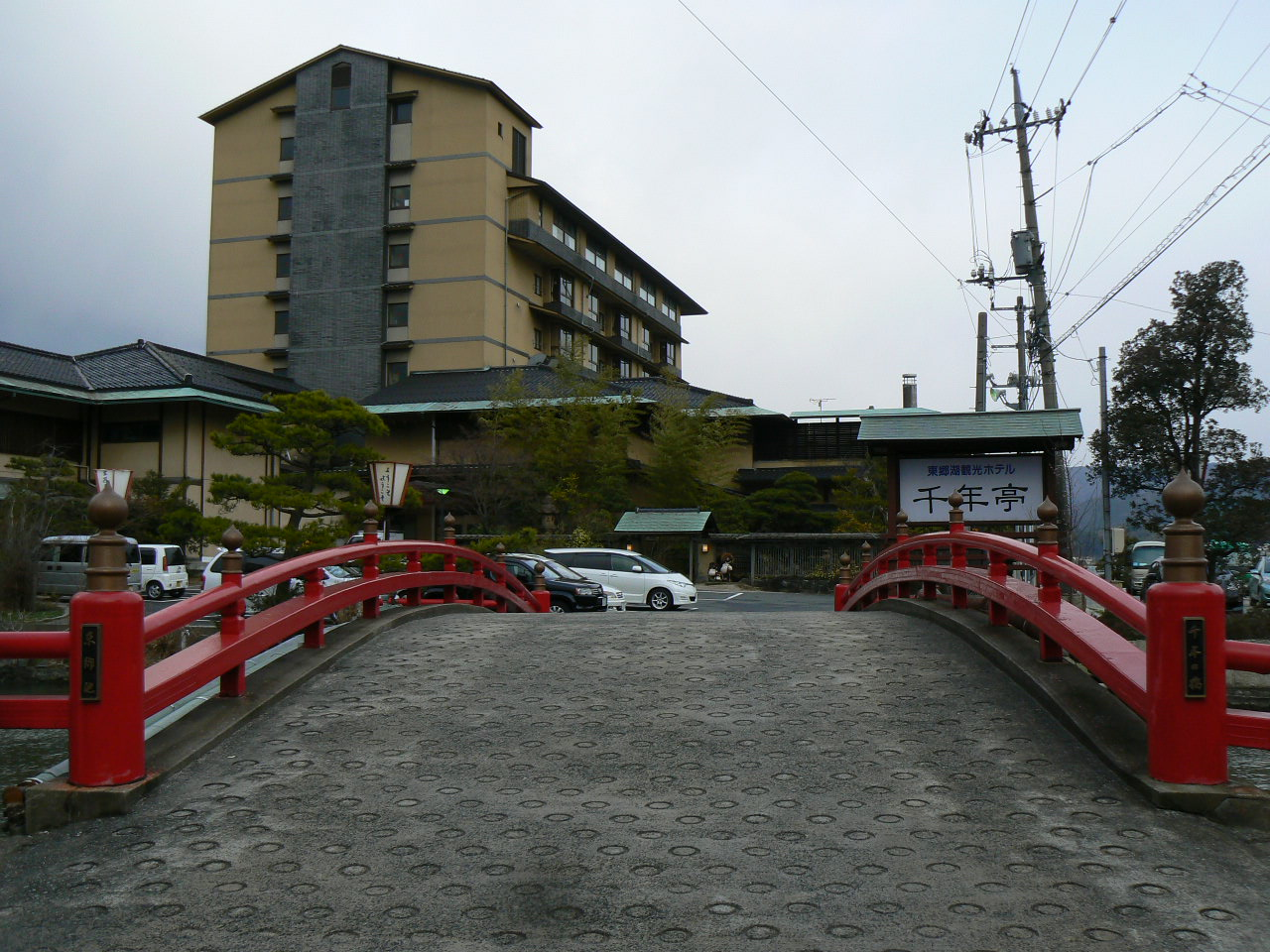
- A ryokan at Hawai Onsen

- Location within Japan
- Interactive map of Hawai Onsen
- Location: Yurihama, Tottori Prefecture, Japan
- Coordinates: 35°28′41.1″N 133°52′57.58″E

Hawai Onsen (はわい温泉) is an onsen in the town of Yurihama, Tōhaku District, in Japan's Tottori Prefecture. In recent years, it is the fourth most popular onsen in the prefecture, following Kaike Onsen, Misasa Onsen, and Yoshioka Onsen. It forms part of Misasa-Tōgōko Prefectural Natural Park, and some of the onsen district's lakeside area sits within Lake Tōgō Hawai Seaside Park.

Hawai Onsen was featured in a television commercial for Softbank, in which Japanese celebrity Reina Triendl plays the role of an exchange student from Hawai Town.

== Hot spring type ==
Hawai Onsen is classified as a chloride and sulfate type hot spring. This is the same classification as Tōgō Onsen, which is across Tōgō Lake on a separate shore.

In 1984, Hawai Onsen produced 1,500 liters of hot spring water every minute, with a source temperature of roughly 50 degrees Celsius. High-temperature water comes out through a gap in the granite bedrock at Hawai Onsen, which can be reached by digging through a layer of alluvium roughly 30 to 60 meters thick, as well as a 40-meter thick layer of diluvium. More than 30 hot spring sources have been dug so far, but many of those have already dried up. Currently, the hot spring waters for Hawai Onsen come from several shared sources.

Originally, Hawai Onsen's hot spring water flowed out from the bottom of Tōgō Lake. However, because the onsen district is built over the lake on reclaimed land, the current onsen waters are sourced from excavated parts of the lake bottom.

== Description ==
The onsen district is built upon a filled in part of the lake, forming a cape; when viewed from other areas, it appears that the Japanese ryokan inns are floating over the lake's surface. Hawai Onsen is distinct due to the construction of a bath built over Tōgō Lake's surface, the ability to drop a fishing line out a ryokan room window directly into the lake, and other features. The bath built over the lake is connected to the shore by a wooden bridge; at night, votive lights are lit on this bridge, elevating the onsen bath atmosphere. It is said that fog often hangs over the surface of the lake, due to the hot spring water coming out of the lake bottom.

The development of seven onsen facilities, associated with the Seven Lucky Gods, were originally planned for the onsen district. Development began with Fukurokuju no yu, an ashiyu footbath. Following this, four more ashiyu were constructed at Hawai Onsen, with two more at Tōgō Onsen; these collectively form the “Baths of the Seven Lucky Gods”.

According to a report that tracked the amount of bath tax collected by Tottori Prefecture, there were around 190,000 visitors to Hawai Onsen's baths in 1998. In 2017, this number had fallen to less than 120,000. For both years, the number of visitors was fourth largest in the prefecture, following Kaike Onsen, Misasa Onsen, and Yoshioka Onsen. However, local government reports estimated that the popularity of Hawai Onsen reached its peak in the late 1990s, with over 570,000 visitors in 1996. According to these figures, Hawai Onsen had around 10,000 visitors per year in 1954, the lowest for any onsen district in the prefecture. In contrast, Tōgō Onsen had three times as many visitors. However, Hawai Onsen rapidly gained popularity in the 1980s, eventually surpassing its neighbor; at the start of the 1990s, Hawai Onsen was one of the most popular onsen districts in Tottori.

== History ==
=== Origins of the name "Hawai" ===
Hawai Onsen is written in Japanese as はわい温泉 (Hawai onsen); this was changed from the characters 羽合温泉 (Hawai onsen) to the current name in 1998 by Hawai Town. The origins of the name Hawai can be traced back to at least the Kamakura period. One historical document written in 1258 details a peace settlement that divided the land in central Tottori, and it refers to the area of modern-day Hawai Town as “Hawaida” (伯井田). These characters were later changed to 羽合田 ("Hawaida"). For example, Kikkawa Motoharu referred to the area this way in a letter written around 1580, during the Sengoku period.

=== Early discovery and development of the onsen ===
The discovery of hot spring waters at Hawai Onsen was first recorded in 1843. Fishermen discovered that hot spring water flowed out from the bottom of Tōgō Lake, so local villagers requested permission from the Tottori Domain to use it. At the time, using hot spring water reduced the need to gather firewood for water heating. Thus, the domain anticipated that this onsen water would cause an increase in farming efficiency, so it granted permission to the villagers. This was the beginning of Hawai Onsen.

The onsen’s development was pioneered by Kōsuke Yumura, a man from Iwami Province who is said to be a descendant of a samurai family. In 1866, Yumura inserted bamboo tubes into the bottom of Tōgō Lake, extracting the hot spring water and funneling it into barrels in a boat. This water was used to make a bath on the surface of the lake, which was known as “Aozora yuba”, and it existed until the start of the Meiji Period. It fell out of use in 1880 due a variety of issues, such as rough waves rocking the boats and drifting them away. Around 1886, Yumura filled in parts of the lakeshore area and excavated some of this reclaimed land. He successfully located a hot spring source, and subsequently opened his own ryokan with an onsen attached. This ryokan was built in the former village of Asozu, so the area was referred to as “Asozu Onsen” and “Osōzu Onsen”.

=== Modern development of the onsen ===
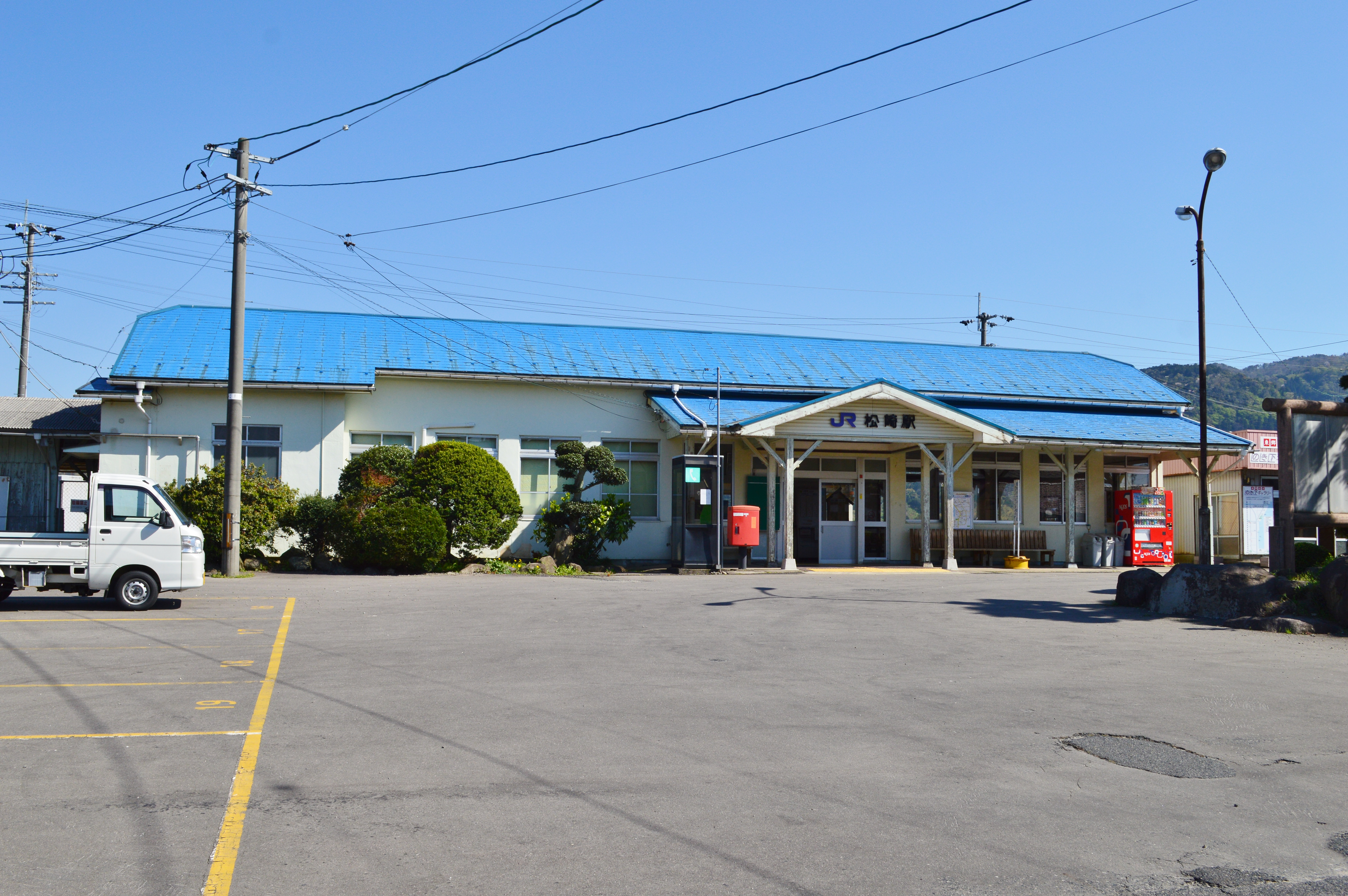
Matsuzaki Station

The San'in Main Line was completed in Tottori Prefecture during the late Meiji Period. As a result, greater numbers of people from the Kansai region of Japan began to visit the prefecture as onsen tourists. This led to an increase in visitors to onsen districts that were close to the train line. Tōgō Onsen became one of the most popular onsen districts in the prefecture due to its convenient location by Matsuzaki Station.

In contrast, Asozu Onsen was comparatively inconvenient to reach, being on a separate shore of Tōgō Lake away from Matsuzaki Station and Tōgō Onsen. However, soon a boat route transporting visitors to Asozu Onsen was created, leading to increased development of the onsen district there during the Taishō period. In 1927, Asozu Onsen was renamed Shin-Tōgō Onsen (“New Tōgō Onsen”).

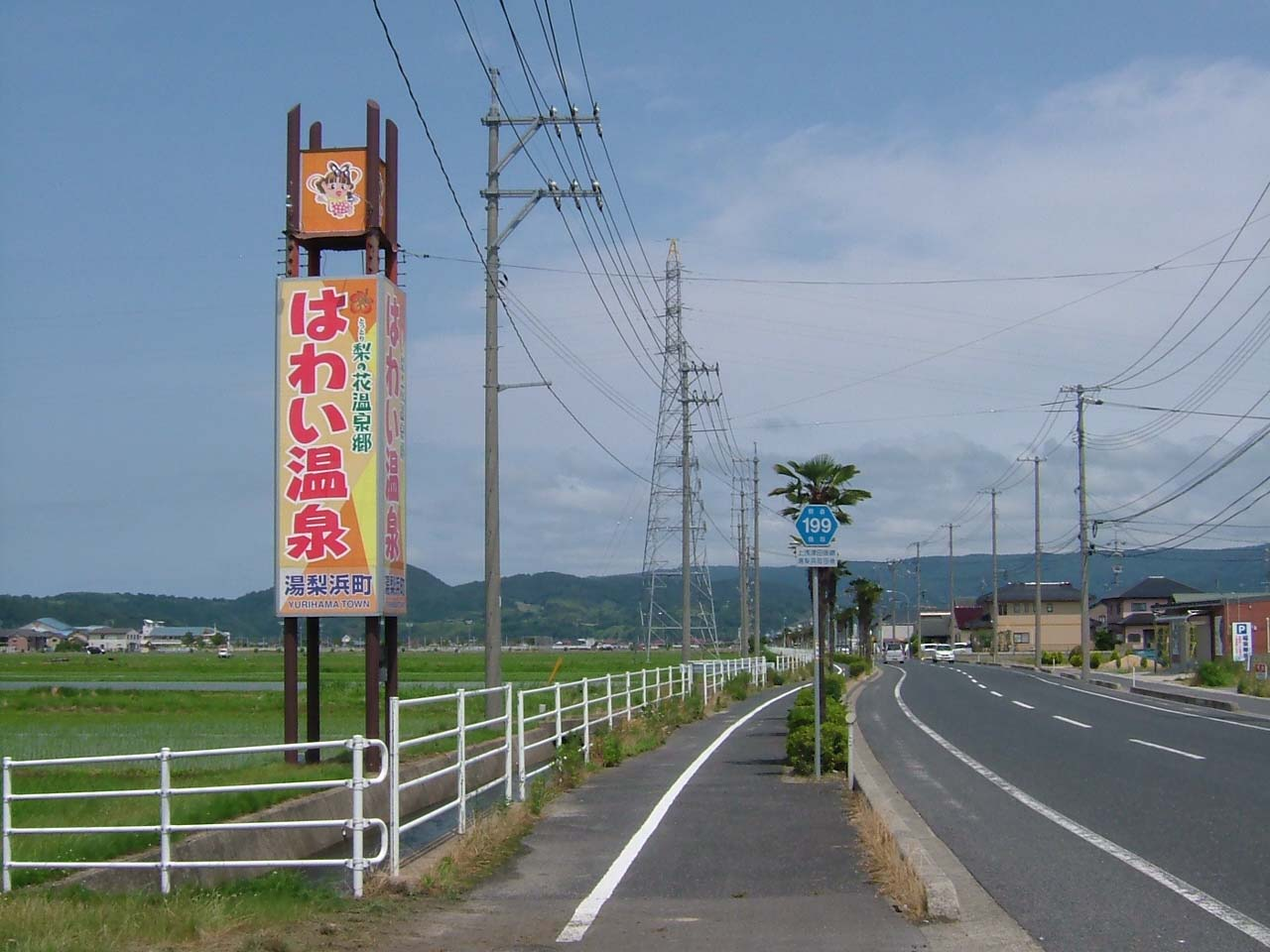
A sign for Hawai Onsen on Prefectural Road 199

Motorization after the end of the Pacific War led to a rapid increase in visitors to Shin-Tōgō Onsen. This was due to its proximity to National Route 9, which brought groups of travelers to the area via bus. From 1954 to 1980, the number of visitors to Shin-Tōgō Onsen increased 24-fold, and larger multi-story inns and hotels were built. More hot spring sources were also developed, which meant that private homes in the area also had access to this hot water supply. During this time, the tourism sector began to rapidly grow in nearby Hawai Town, which originally relied solely on agriculture. In 1978, Shin-Tōgō Onsen was renamed to Hawai Onsen (羽合温泉) to commemorate the 25th anniversary of Hawai Town's founding.

In 1998, the written characters for Hawai Onsen were officially changed to はわい温泉. In October 2004, Hawai Town merged with the neighboring Tōgō Town and Tomari Village. The new town's name, Yurihama (湯梨浜), includes a reference to Hawai Onsen and Tōgō Onsen, as the town's first character, 湯, means “hot water”.
