= Shitori Shrine (Tottori) =

Shinto shrine in Tottori Prefecture, Japan

Shitori Jinja 倭文神社
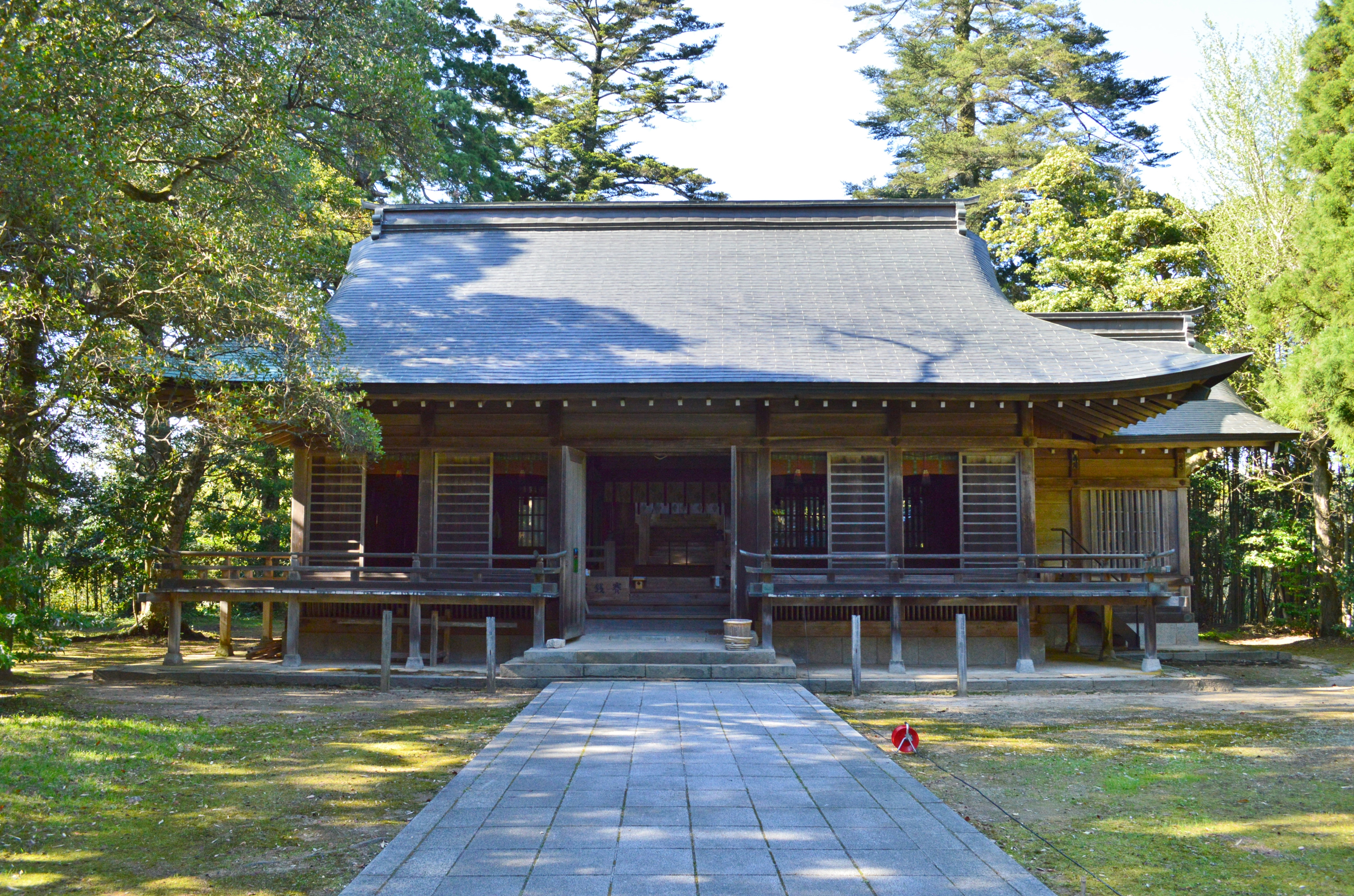
- Haiden of Shitori Jinja Shrine

- Location within Tottori Prefecture Location within Japan

Religion
- Affiliation: Shinto
- Deity: Takehazuchi-no-Mikoto
- Festival: 1 May

Location
- Location: 754 Miyauchi, Yurihama-cho, Tohaku-gun, Tottori-ken
- Interactive map of Shitori Jinja 倭文神社
- Coordinates: 35°29′25.34″N 133°54′10.68″E

Architecture
- Style: Nagare-zukuri
- Established: unknown

Website
- Official website

Shitori Shrine (倭文神社) is a Shinto shrine in the Miyauchi neighborhood of the town of Yurihama in Tottori Prefecture, Japan, on the east bank of Lake Tōgō. It is the ichinomiya of former Hōki Province. The main festival of the shrine is held annually on 1 May.

== Enshrined kami ==
The kami enshrined at Shitori Shrine are:

- Takehazuchi-no-Mikoto (建葉槌命)
- Shitateruhime-no-Mikoto (下照姫命)
- Takeminakata (建御名方命)
- Ame-no-wakahiko (天稚彦命)
- Kotoshironushi (事代主命)
- Sukunabikona (少彦名命)
- Ajisukitakahikone (味耜高彦根命)

== History ==
The origins of Shitori Shrine are unknown. Although there is no documentary evidence, it is believed that it began as the family shrine for the Shitori clan (倭文氏) of Kofun period craftsmen who weavers, who regarded Takehazuchi-no-Mikoto as their ancestor. However, the shrine's legends are all centered around Shitateruhime-no-Mikoto, whom the shrine legend claims arrived in this location from Izumo by boat. She established her residence on the mountain behind this shrine, and after her death, she was buried in a kofun constructed in the shrine's precincts.

The earliest this shrine appears in documentary records is in the AD 808 medical text Daido-ruishu-ho (大同類聚方). During the Sengoku period, the shine was laid to waste, but it was reconstructed by the Amago clan and was later supported by the Ikeda clan, the daimyō of Tottori Domain. During the Meiji period era of State Shinto, the shrine was rated as a National shrine, 3rd rank (国幣中社, Kokuhei Shosha) under the modern system of ranked Shinto Shrines.

=== Hōki Ichinomiya Sutra Mound ===
Until the early 20th century, Shitateruhime-no-Mikoto was regarded as the primary deity of this shrine. However, in 1915 an archaeological excavation discovered that the purported empun-style circular burial mound was actually a sutra mound. The mound had a diameter of 16-meters and height of 1.6 meters. It contains a rectangular stone box that was 1.2 x 0.9 x 0.5 meters made of andesite flat stones. The inside was covered with coarse sand, and contained copper sutra cylinder with inscriptions. The inscription was dated 1103 and was inscribed by monk named Kyoson of the Hōki Ichinomiya. In addition to the sutra cylinder, the box contained a gilt-bronze statue of Kannon Bosatsu, an image of Miroku Bosatsu engraving on a copper plate, a bronze mirror, a cypress fan, a short sword, beads, and copper coins. The sutra tube was buried in 1103 (Kōwa 5) and marked as "2052 years after the death of the Buddha Sakyamani". The sutra mounds are valuable in considering the burial memorial service in the Heian period. The sutra mound was designated as a National Historic Site in 1935. All excavated items are stored at the Tokyo National Museum.

== Location ==
The shrine is located a 35-minute walk from Matsuzaki Station on the JR West San'in Main Line.

== Cultural Properties ==
=== National Treasures ===
- Hoki Ichinomiya Sutra Mound Excavated Items (伯耆一宮経塚出土品)

== Gallery ==
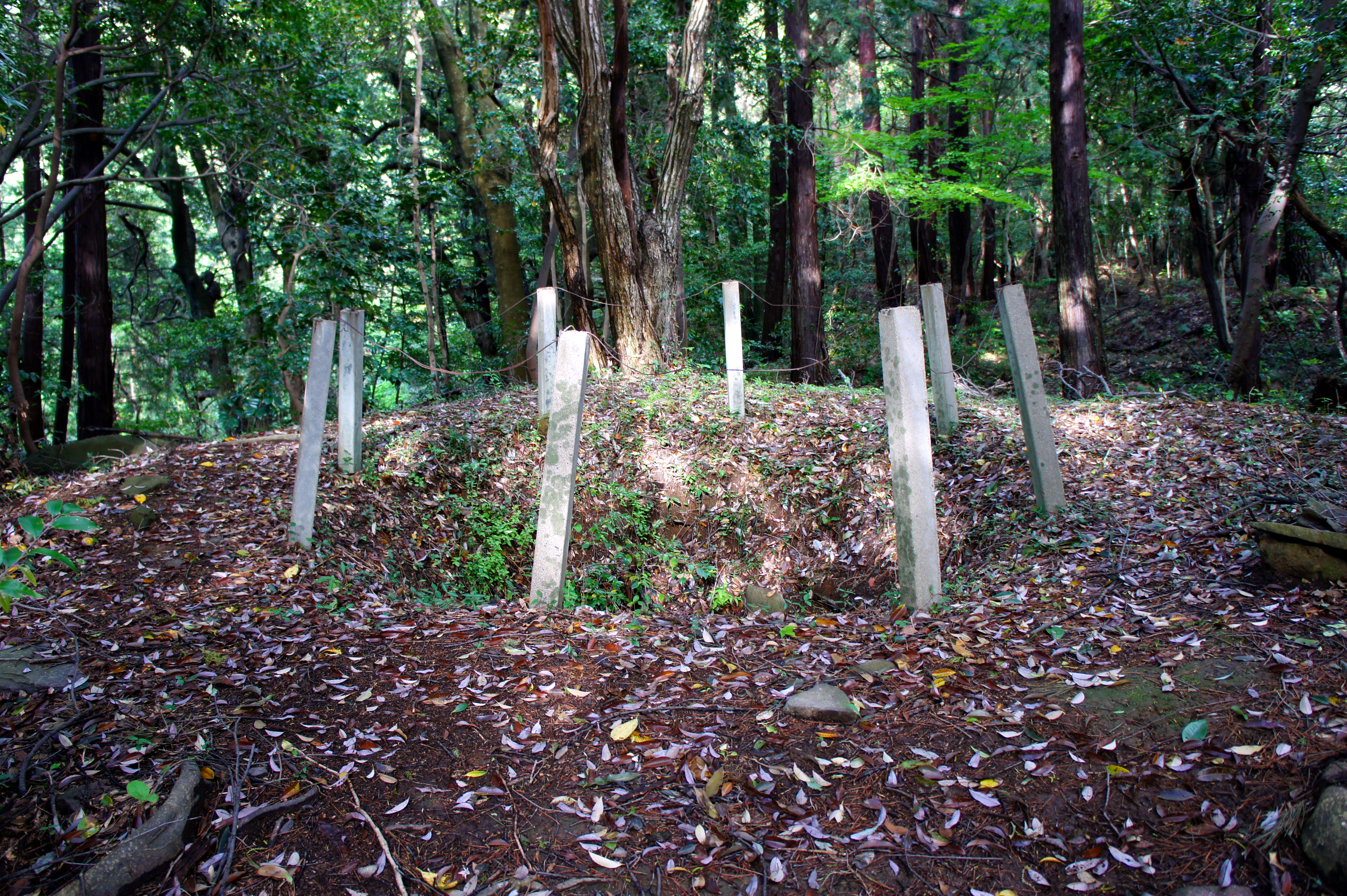
Sutra Mound

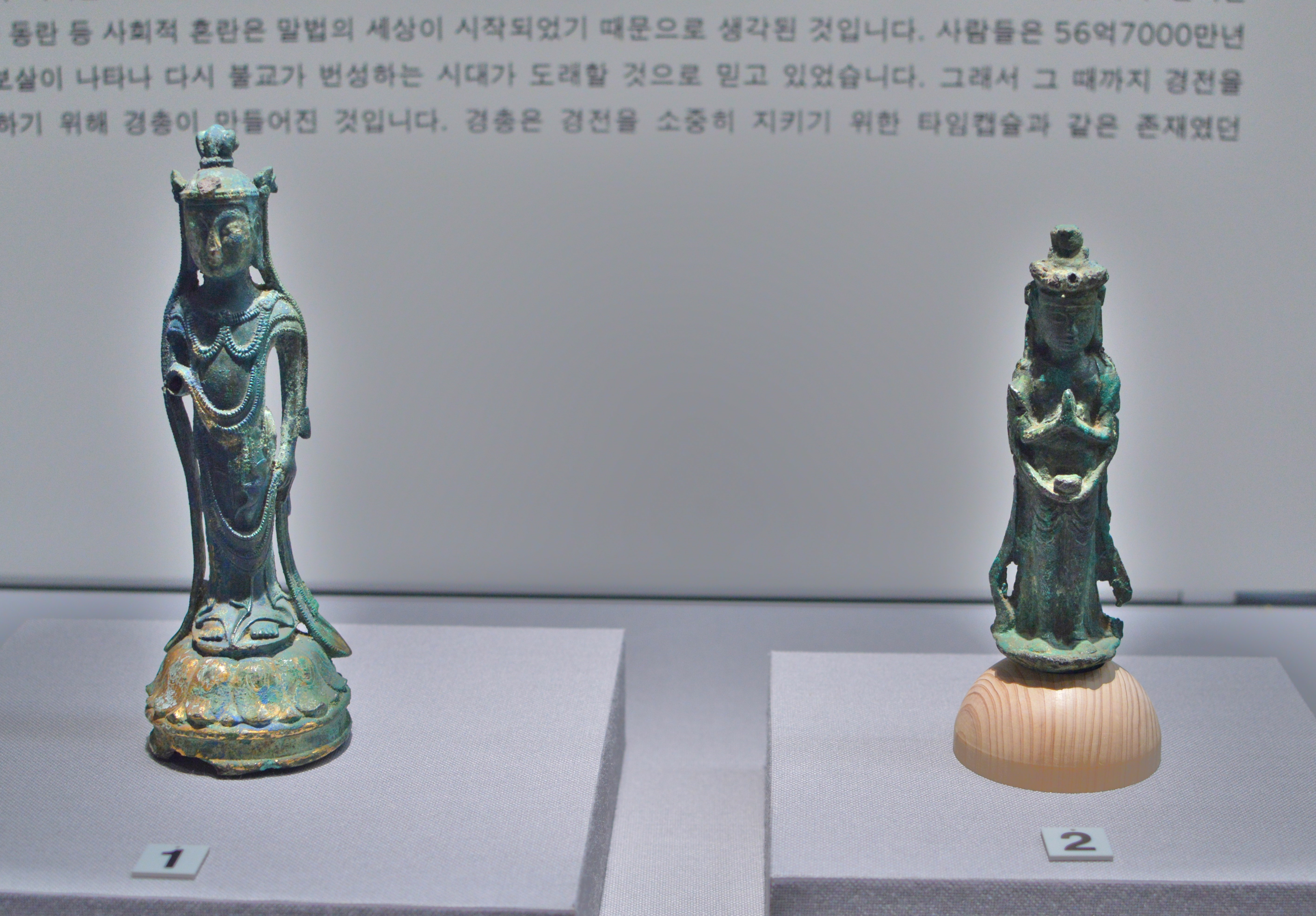
Recovered artifacts from the Sutra Mound

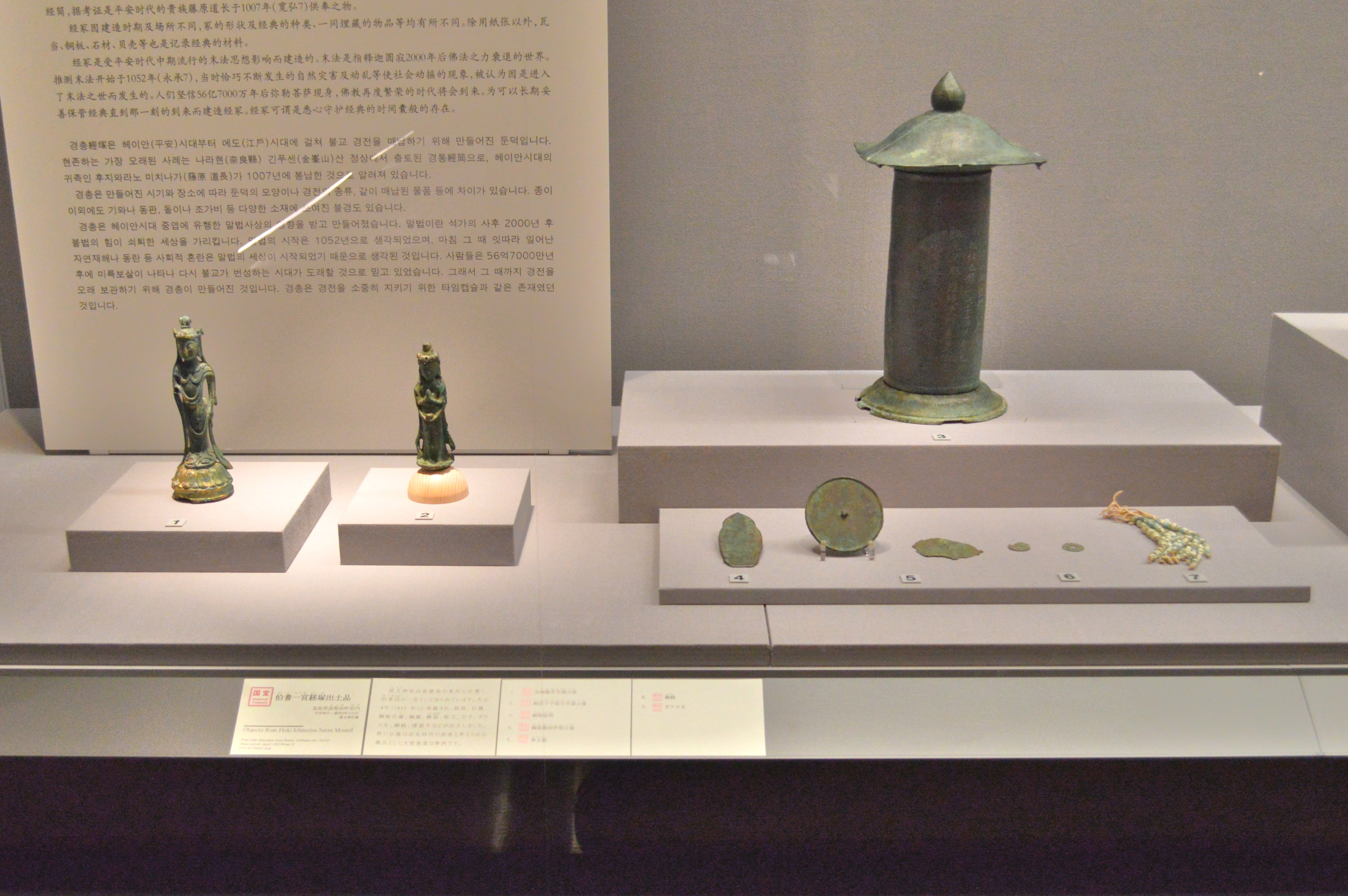
Recovered artifacts from the Sutra Mound

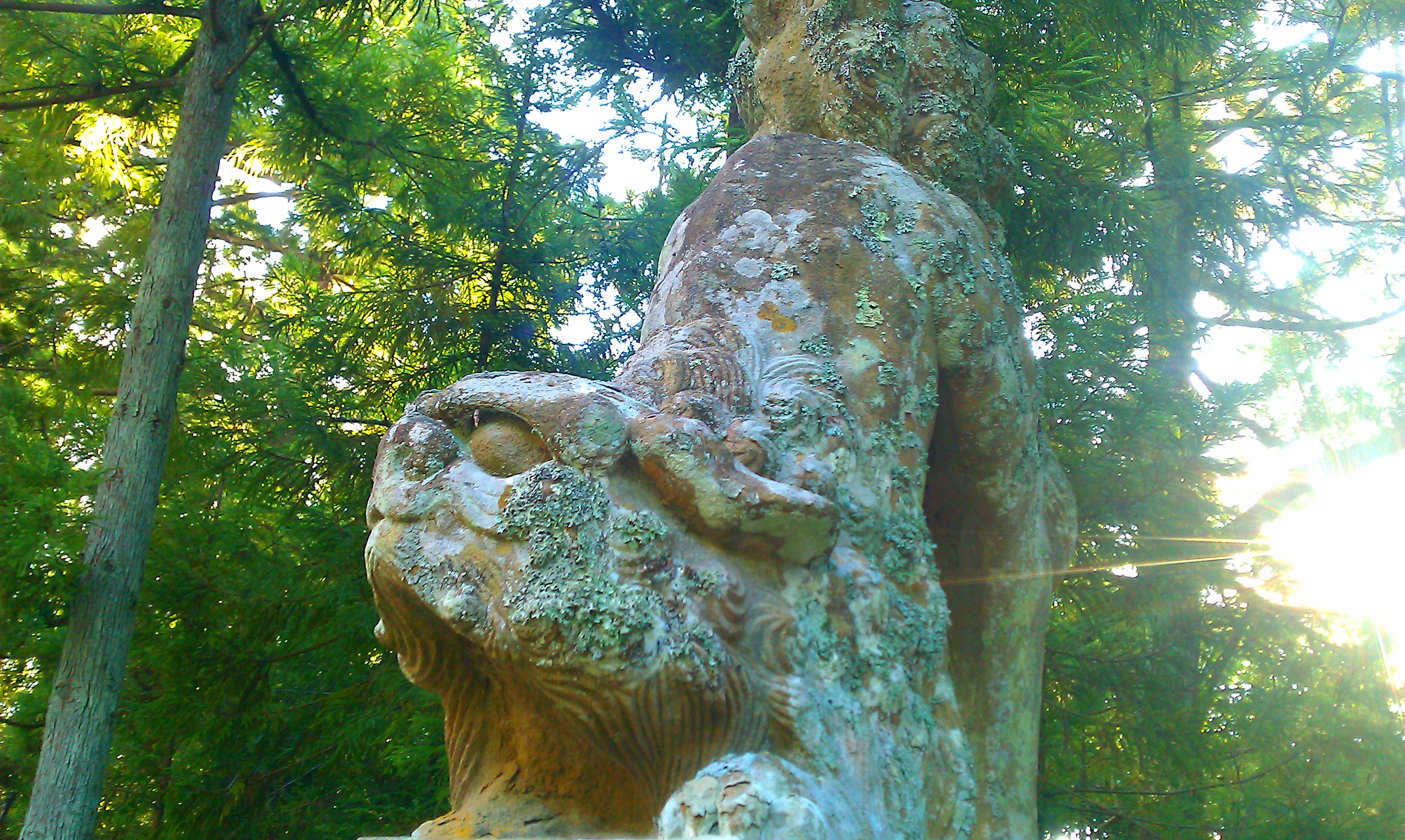
Komainu

== See also ==
- List of Shinto shrines
- List of Historic Sites of Japan (Tottori)
- List of National Treasures of Japan (archaeological materials)
- Ichinomiya
