= Daiei (disambiguation) =

Daiei may refer to:

- Daiei, a Japanese supermarket chain
- Daiei (era), a Japanese historical era
- Daiei Film, a Japanese film studio that went bankrupt and was acquired by Kadokawa Pictures
- Daiei Unions (大映ユニオンズ), a baseball team owned by Daiei Film
- Daiei Television (大映テレビ), a company formerly belonging to Daiei Film
- Daiei, Tottori, a town in Tottori Prefecture
