= Tōgō Onsen =

Hot spring in Yurihama, Tottori Prefecture, Japan

- 東郷温泉
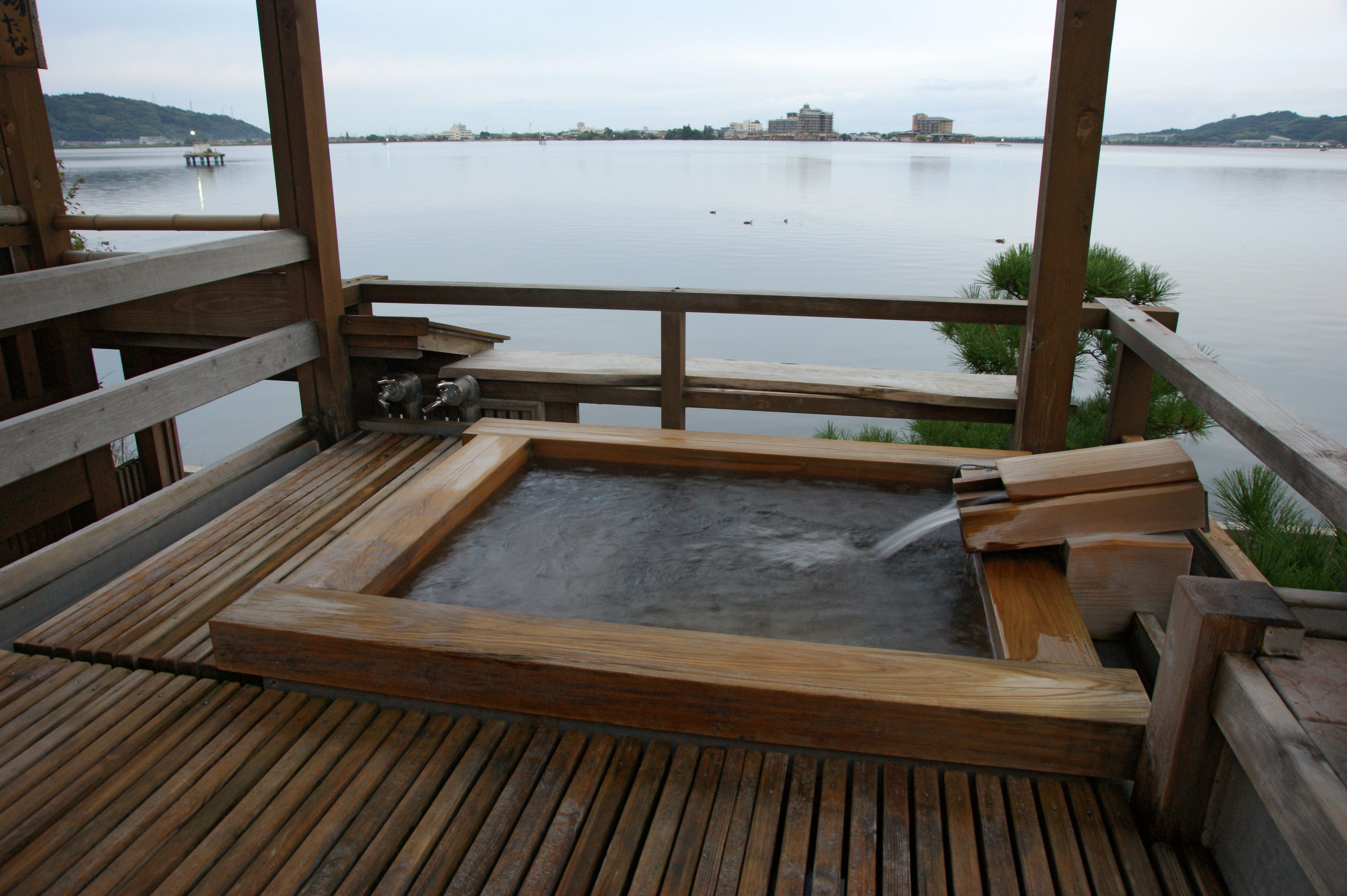
- Tōgō Onsen

- Location within Japan
- Interactive map of Tōgō Onsen
- Location: Yurihama, Tottori Prefecture, Japan
- Coordinates: 35°29′N 133°52′E

Tōgō Onsen (東郷温泉) is an onsen in the town of Yurihama in Tottori Prefecture, Japan. It was the second most popular onsen area in Tottori Prefecture during the beginning of the Shōwa era.

== Hot spring type ==
Tōgō Onsen is classified as a chloride and sulfate type hot spring, with a spring source temperature of 85 to 94 degrees Celsius.

Tōgō Onsen’s hot spring waters can be found near Matsuzaki station. Here, there is a 300-meter deep cavity in the layer of granite bedrock. This cavity is filled in with conglomerate sedimentary rock, called the Oshikagawa pyroclastic layer, along with diluvium and alluvium layers on top of it. Tōgō Onsen’s water originates from the granite, Oshikagawa, and diluvium layers, and its heat source is thought to be waste heat from the granite layer.

== Description ==
There is a large multipurpose health resort at the edge of Tōgō Lake. Nearby is Japan’s largest Chinese garden, Enchō-en. The main hot spring resort area is to the east, where several Japanese ryokan inns operated up until and during Shōwa period. Currently, only two establishments, Yōshōkan and the town-managed Suimeisō, are in operation. Hot spring water flows out of the central part of the lake, causing steam to hang over its surface.

There are two ashiyu footbaths in the area, which are free for anyone to use. At Tōgō-Hawai Seaside Park, there is a hot water fountain that can be used to create boiled eggs, known as onsen tamago. The other footbath is at Lake Tōgō Lakeside Park, which also has a station for making onsen tamago. According to figures reported by the local government, Tōgō Onsen reached its peak number of visitors from the early to mid-1970’s, with more than 350,000 visitors per year. In contrast, most other hot spring areas within Tottori Prefecture reached their peak visitor count from the late 1980’s to 1993.

== History ==
The existence of the hot spring was referenced in a document written in 1749. At the time, hot spring water was drawn out by bamboo tubes inserted into the bottom of the lake, in conjunction with bamboo gates. Other documents show that the residents of Kami-Asozu village in modern-day Yurihama received permission from the Tottori Domain to draw water from the hot spring in 1843; during the Ansei Period, the hot spring water was used to treat low back pain.

=== The origins of Tōgō Onsen ===
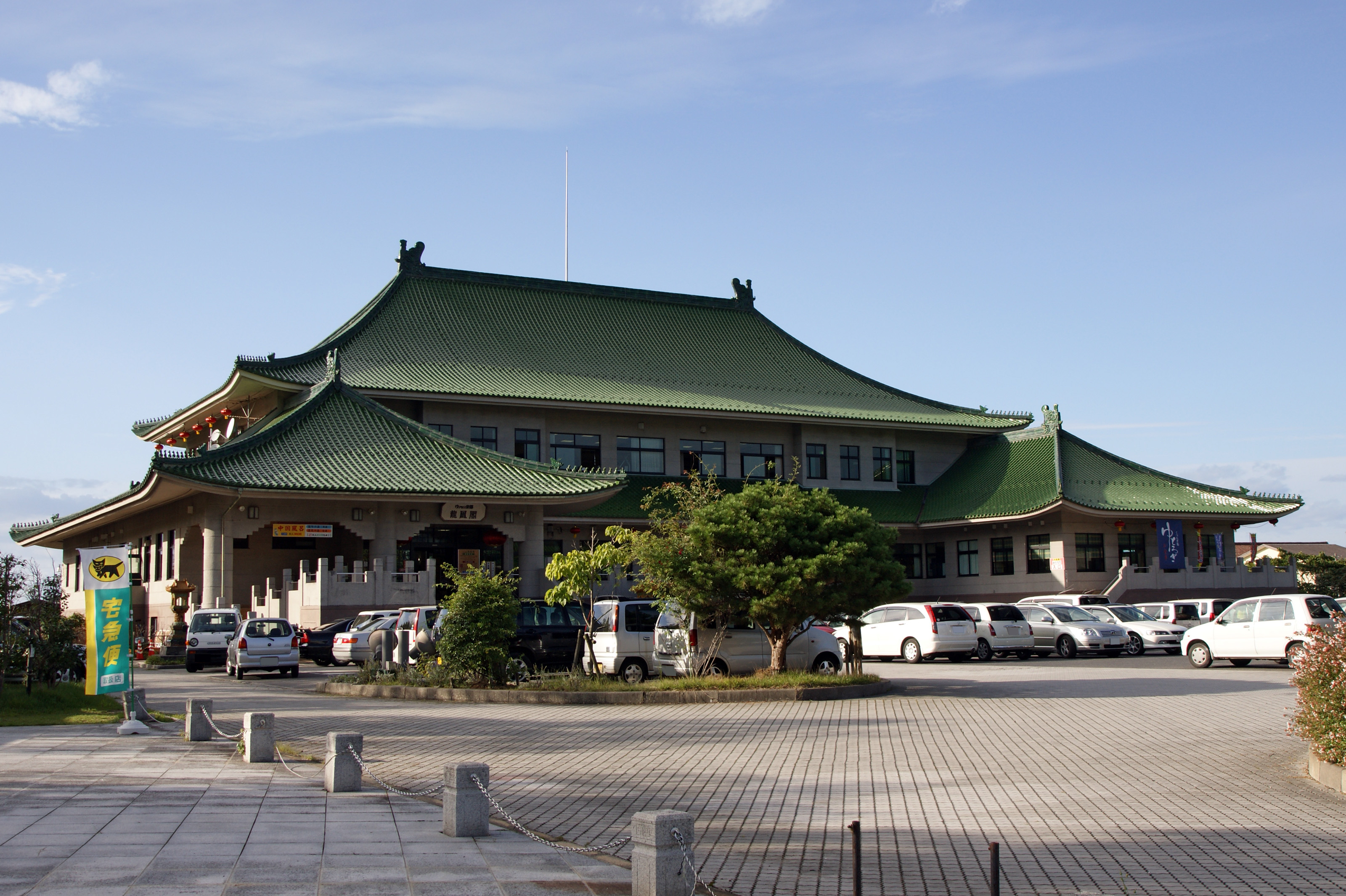
Tōgō Yu-asis Ryūhōkaku

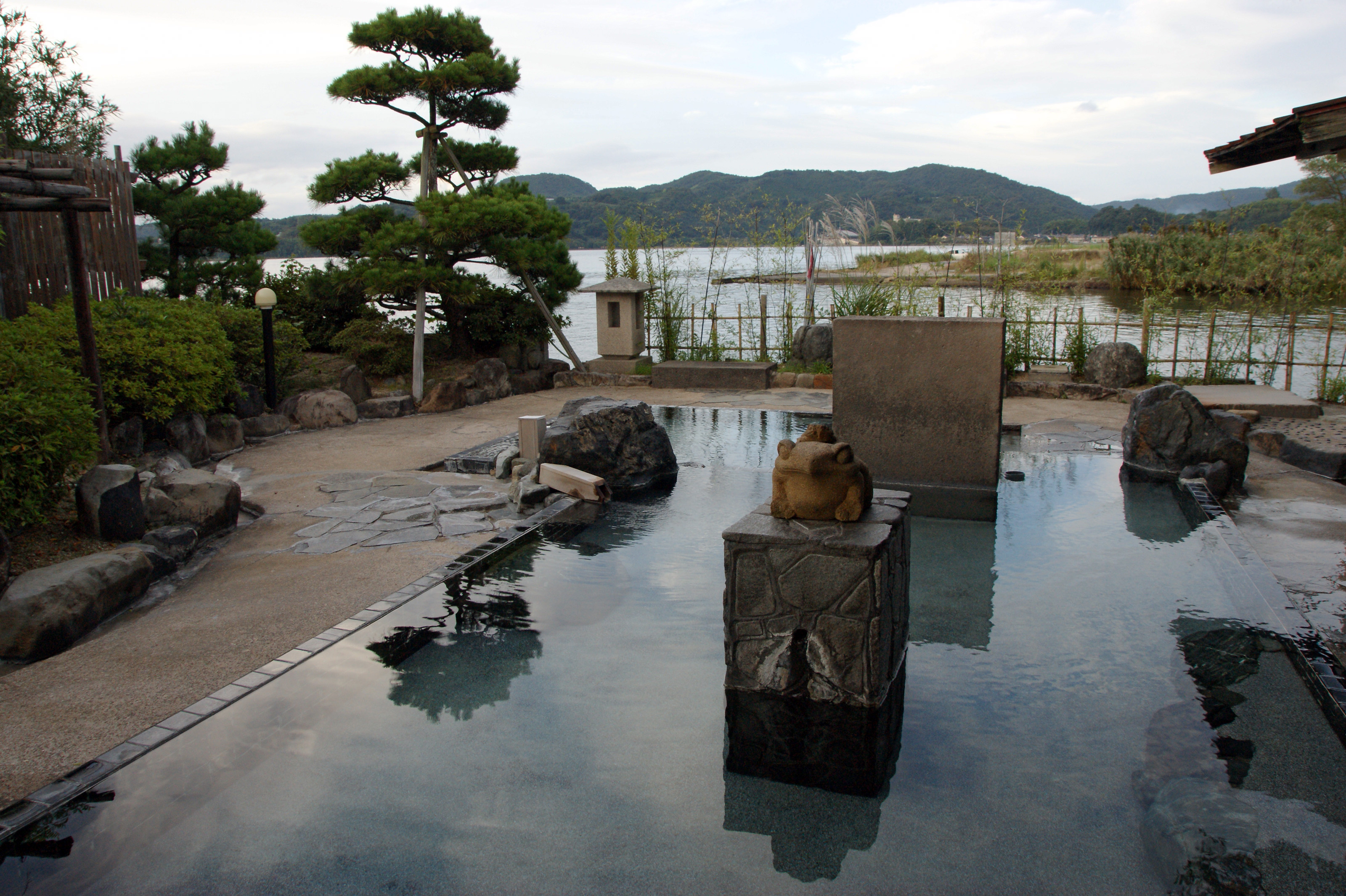
A view of Tōgō Lake from an outdoor onsen

Use of the hot springs for bathing began in 1868, at the start of the Meiji Period; in 1872, a large bath tub was constructed on Ryūyu-tō Island, which was located on the lake. A wealthy local farmer created a well for drawing spring water on the western bank of Tōgō River, as well as a separate building called the Yōshōkan, and gave access to the villagers. In 1884, this building began operating as a ryokan business. With the opening of the San'in Main Line and Matsuzaki station at the end of the Meiji Period, the number of yearly visitors reached 10,000 and the name Tōgō Onsen was given to the area. Japanese novelist Naoya Shiga once visited the Yōshōkan, and he mentions it in his short story collection Tottori. The Yōshōkan is still operating today.

=== The origins of Matsuzaki Onsen ===
At the start of the Taishō period, other areas near Matsuzaki station experienced an increase in onsen excavation. Around this time, many books about travel such as Japanese novelist Katai Tayama’s Nihon Isshū (“A trip round Japan”) were being published, and public interest towards domestic travel was growing. Scientific surveys for onsen were also being conducted; this led to the discovery of a new hot spring source during the late Taishō period, located near Matsuzaki station in Tōgō River. As a result, many new inns were built. These inns became collectively known as “Matsuzaki Onsen”, and soon the names Tōgō Onsen and Matsuzaki Onsen began to appear in documents.

=== Consolidation into Tōgō Onsen ===
Soon after Matsuzaki Onsen was created, it was formed into an association with Tōgō Onsen. According to the Nihon onsen taikan (Japan Onsen Encyclopedia) published in 1939, the total number of yearly lodging guests to the association’s seven inns at the time was 62,000. This made it the second most-visited onsen district in Tottori Prefecture, following Misasa Onsen’s 80,000 guests per year to its 20 inns. During the Edo Period, the narrow lakeshore on the eastern bank of the Tōgō River was a strategically important location for military and transportation purposes, so there was a lodge there. During the Meiji Period, the area had grown to become Matsuzaki Village, and had its own local government. Similarly, Tōgō Onsen and the surrounding areas formed Tōgō Village. In 1951, Matsuzaki Village and Tōgō Village merged to become Tōgō-Matsuzaki Town; in 1953, this entity merged with surrounding villages to form Tōgō Town. After this, the names of the hot springs were consolidated into “Tōgō Onsen”.

From the Meiji Period to the Shōwa Period, many famous people visited Tōgō Onsen, such as politicians Shigenobu Ōkuma, Shinpei Gotō, Yukio Ozaki, and Hiroshi Shimomura. Besides the aforementioned Katai Tayama and Naoya Shiga, writers such as Lafcadio Hearn, Shungetsu Ikuta, Rohan Kōda, and others have also visited.
