= Hashizu Kofun Cluster =

- 橋津古墳群 (Japanese)
- Hashizu Kofun Cluster Hashizu Kofun Cluster (Japan)
- Interactive map of Hashizu Kofun Cluster
- 35°30′16″N 133°52′55″E
- Type: kofun
- Periods: Kofun period
- Location: Yurihama, Tottori, Tottori Prefecture Japan
- Region: San'in region

History
- Built: 4th century AD

Site notes
- Public access: Yes (no facilities)

The Hashizu Kofun Cluster (橋津古墳群) is a group of Kofun period burial mounds located in the Hashizu neighborhood of the town of Yurihama, Tottori Prefecture in the San'in region of Japan. The tumulus group was designated a National Historic Site of Japan in 1957.

== Overview ==
The Hashizu Kofun Cluster is located on the Umanoyama Hill, between the Sea of Japan and Lake Tōgō at an elevation of 107 meters above sea level. The cluster consists of five zenpō-kōen-fun (前方後円墳), which are shaped like a keyhole, having one square end and one circular end, when viewed from above and 19 round (empun (円墳)) tumuli dating from the early to late Kofun period. The site is therefore also called the Umanoyama Kofun Cluster (馬ノ山古墳群). Of the 24 tumuli, 14 are covered in the National Historic Site designation.

Of the keyhole-shaped burial mounds, Tumulus No. 4, which was built in the early Kofun period (around the middle of the 4th century) and which a total length of about 100 meters, is the largest, and includes a pit-style stone burial chamber and a cylindrical haniwa-style coffin. The interior was filled with red clay, and the exterior covered in plate-like stones and cylindrical haniwa. Grave goods recovered include triangular-rimmed divine beast bronze mirrors, jade magatama and jasper cylindrical beads. Tumulus No.4 is presumed to be one of the earliest keyhole-shaped kofun in the eastern portion of Hōki Province.

The tumulus cluster is located 30-minutes by car from Kurayoshi Station on the JR West San'in Main Line.

== See also ==
- List of Historic Sites of Japan (Tottori)
