= Tomari Station (Tottori) =

Railway station in Yurihama, Tottori Prefecture, Japan

Tomari Station 泊駅
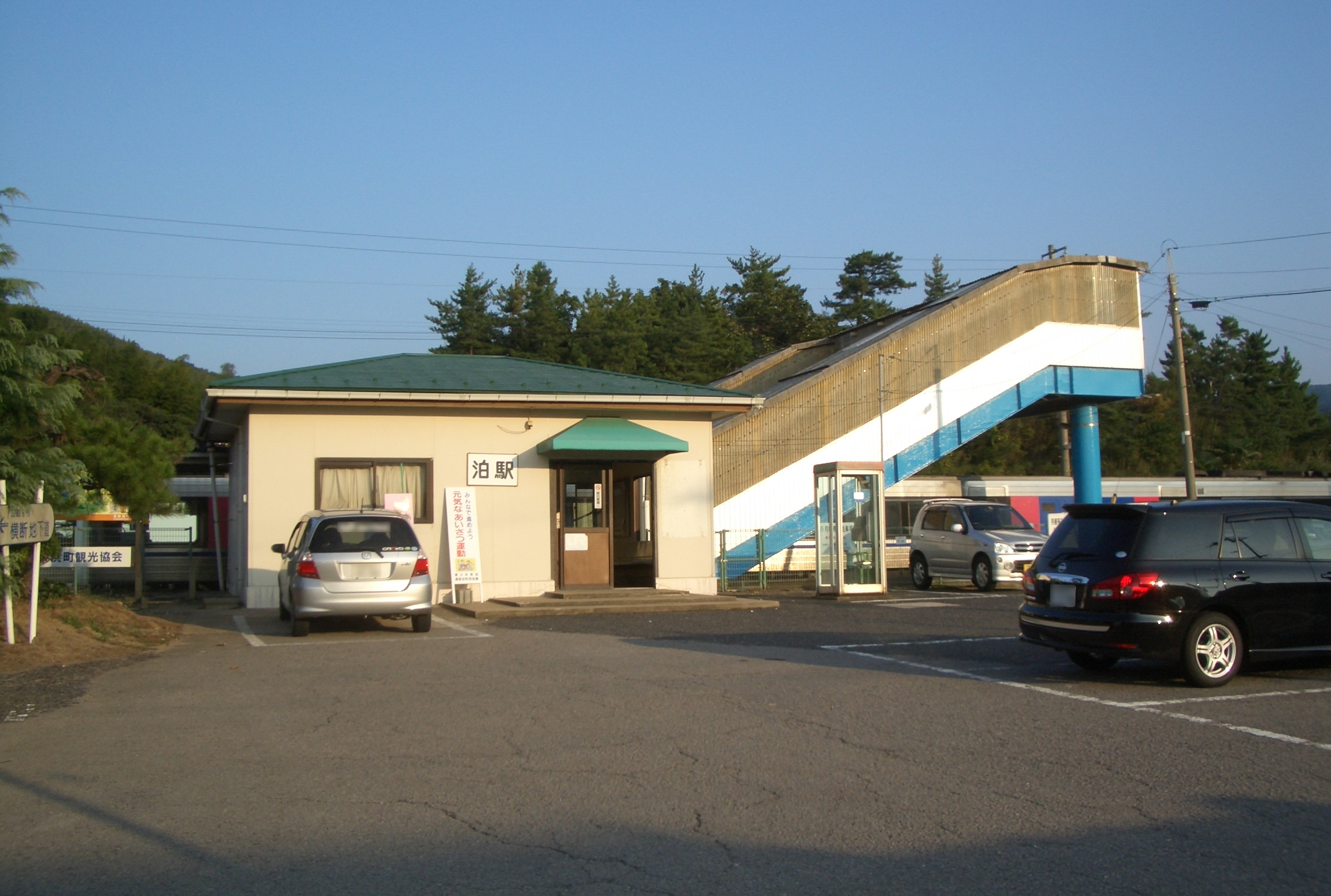
- Tomari Station

General information
- Location: Sono, Yurihama-cho, Tōhaku-gun, Tottori-ken 689-0605; Japan
- Coordinates: 35°30′33.67″N 133°56′11.06″E
- Operator: JR West
- Line: San'in Main Line
- Distance: 258.9 km (160.9 miles) from Kyoto
- Platforms: 1 side + 1 island platform
- Tracks: 3

Construction
- Structure type: At grade

Other information
- Status: Unstaffed
- Website: Official website

History
- Opened: 15 May 1905

Passengers
- 2018: 204 daily

Services
| Preceding station | JR West | Following station |
|---|---|---|
| Matsuzaki towards Yonago | San'in Line Local | Aoya towards Kinosaki-Onsen |
| Matsuzaki towards Yonago | San'in Line Tottori Liner | Aoya towards Kinosaki-Onsen |
Location
- Location within Tottori Prefecture Location within Japan

Tomari Station (泊駅, Tomari-eki) is a passenger railway station located in the town of Yurihama, Tōhaku District, Tottori Prefecture, Japan. It is operated by the West Japan Railway Company (JR West).

== Lines ==
Tomari Station is served by the San'in Main Line, and is located 258.9 kilometers from the terminus of the line at Kyoto.

== Station layout ==
The station consists of one ground-level side platform and one island platform connected by a footbridge to the station building. The station is unattended.

=== Platforms ===
| 1 | ■ San'in Main Line | for Hamasaka and Tottori |
| 2 | ■ San'in Main Line | for Kurayoshi and Yonago |
| 3 | ■ San'in Main Line | shunt for local trains in both directions to permit express trains to pass |

== History ==
Tomari Station opened on May 15, 1905. With the privatization of the Japan National Railways (JNR) on April 1, 1987, the station came under the aegis of the West Japan Railway Company. A new station building was completed in July 2022.

== Passenger statistics ==
In fiscal 2018, the station was used by an average of 204 passengers daily.

== Surrounding area ==
- Yurihama Town Office Tomari Office

== See also ==
- List of railway stations in Japan
