= Enchō-en =

Coordinates: 35°27′57″N 133°53′35″E

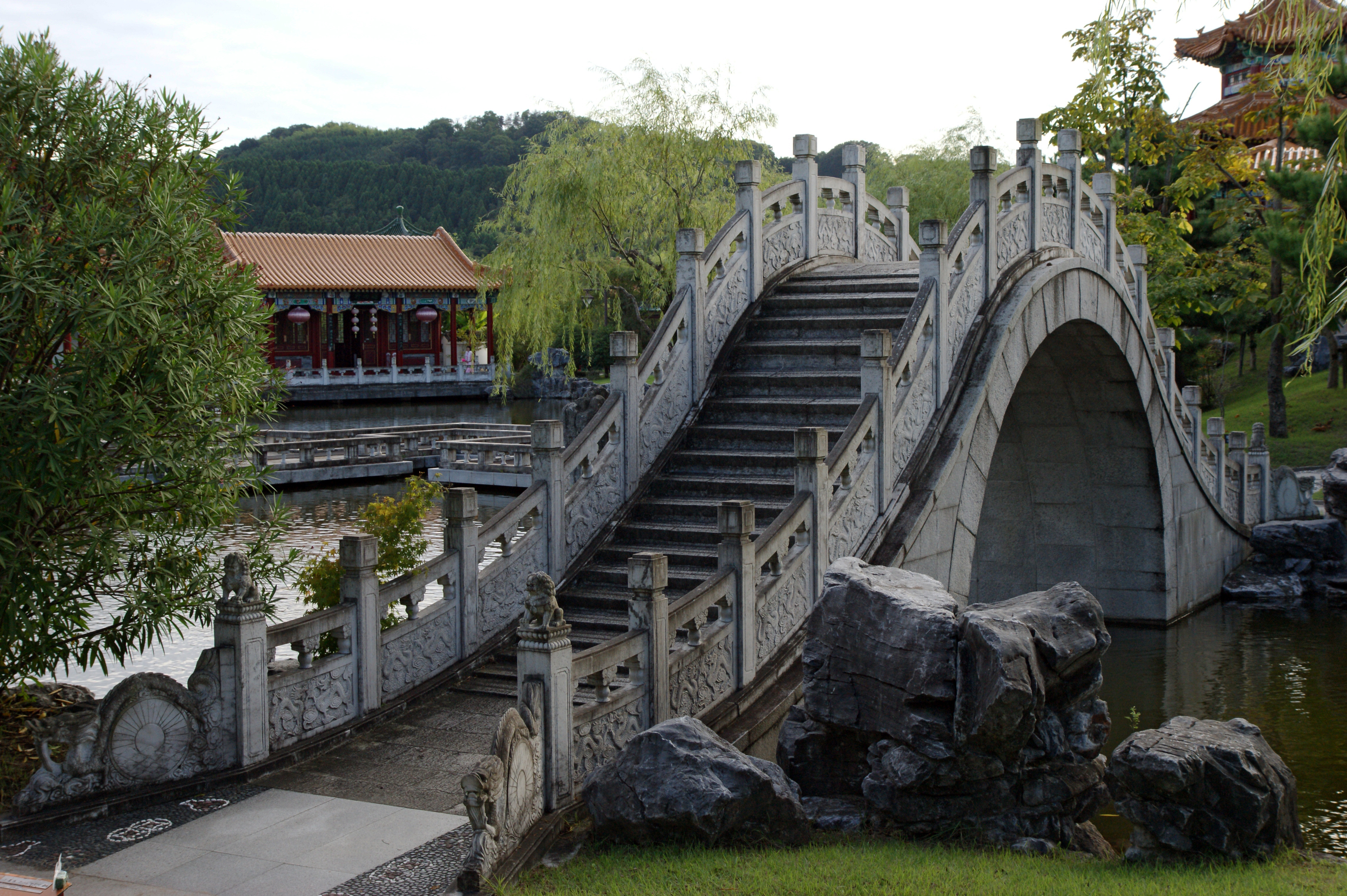
Nanahoshi-hashi (Seven Stars Bridge), Enchō-en

The gardens of Enchō-en (燕趙園) are located in Yurihama, Tottori Prefecture, Japan. They are one of the largest Chinese-style gardens in Japan and a symbol of friendship between Tottori Prefecture and Hebei Province.

== Background ==
Tottori and Hebei are each domestic leaders in the cultivation of pears. From this shared bond a friendship agreement between the two was signed in 1986, leading to cooperation in the fields of agriculture and science. To celebrate the tenth anniversary of the "sister-province" relationship, Enchō-en opened in 1996.

== Gardens ==
Enchō-en occupies an area of 10,000 m^{2} on the southern shore of Lake Tōgō, against the backdrop of the local mountains. The gardens were designed by an architect from Hebei in imitation of an imperial Chinese garden, incorporating materials and trees sourced from China. The gardens feature twenty-eight celebrated views, including a miniature mountain made of stone from Yanshan, a lotus pond, bridges, gates, and pavilions. The roof tiles are yellow, a colour formerly reserved for the Chinese Emperor, and the walls painted with Chinese dragons and decorative motifs. There is also a hall for performances of Peking Opera and exhibitions of Chinese Art.

== Environs ==
Adjoining Enchō-en is a miniature Chinatown, with a peony garden and Chinese restaurants. Several times a year cosplay enthusiasts gather and dress competitively in Chinese style.

== See also ==
- Classical Gardens of Suzhou
- Tottori Nijisseiki Pear Museum
- Borrowed scenery
