= Hōjō, Tottori =

Dissolved municipality in Tottori prefecture, Japan

Hōjō (北条町, Hōjō-chō) was a town located in Tōhaku District, Tottori Prefecture, Japan.

As of 2003, the town had an estimated population of 7,770 and a density of 371.41 persons per km^{2}. The total area was 20.92 km^{2}.

On October 1, 2005, Hōjō, along with the town of Daiei (also from Tōhaku District), was merged to create the town of Hokuei.
