= Tōgō, Tottori =

Dissolved municipality in Tottori prefecture, Japan

Tōgō (東郷町, Tōgō-chō) was a town located in Tōhaku District, Tottori Prefecture, Japan.

As of 2003, the town had an estimated population of 6,461 and a density of 137.26 persons per km^{2}. The total area was 47.07 km^{2}.

On October 1, 2004, Tōgō, along with the town of Hawai, and the village of Tomari (all from Tōhaku District), was merged to create the town of Yurihama.
