= Yurihama, Tottori =

Yurihama 湯梨浜町
- Town
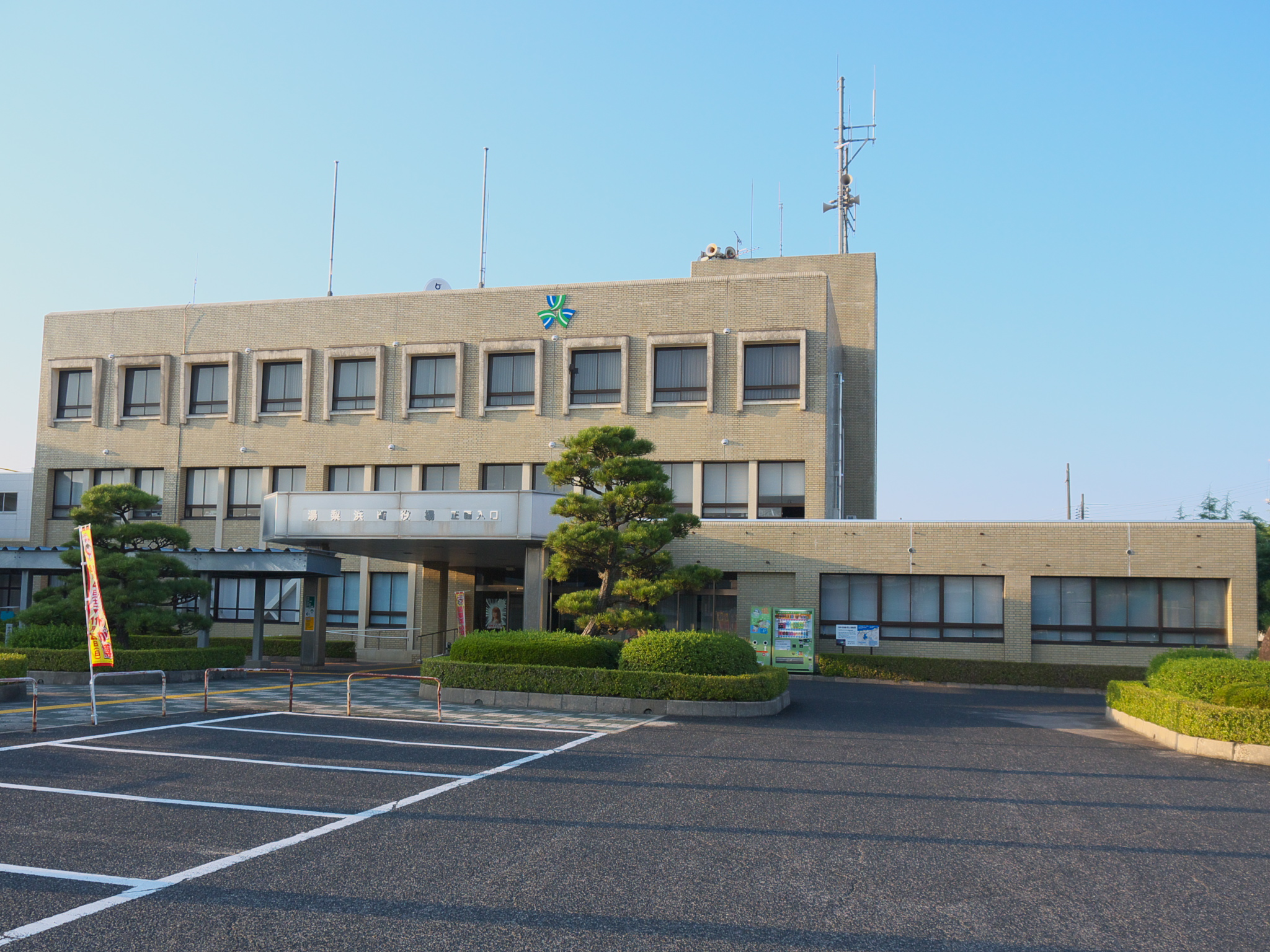
- Yurihama town office

- Flag Emblem
- Location of Yurihama in Tottori Prefecture
- Location in Japan
- Coordinates: 35°29′N 133°52′E
- Country: Japan
- Region: Chūgoku; San'in
- Prefecture: Tottori
- District: Tōhaku

Area
  - Total: 77.94 km^{2} (30.09 sq mi)

Population (December 31, 2022)
  - Total: 16,515
  - Density: 211.9/km^{2} (548.8/sq mi)
- Time zone: UTC+09:00 (JST)
- City hall address: 19-1 Hisadome, Yurihama-chō, Tōhaku-gun, Tottori-ken 682-0723
- Website: Official website
- Symbols
- Bird: Sankōchō
- Flower: Touteiran
- Tree: Nashi pear

Yurihama (湯梨浜町, Yurihama-chō) is a town located in Tōhaku District, Tottori Prefecture, Japan. As of 31 December 2022, the town had an estimated population of 16,515 in 6452 households and a population density of 210 persons per km^{2}. The total area of the town is 77.94 square kilometres (30.09 sq mi).

== Geography ==
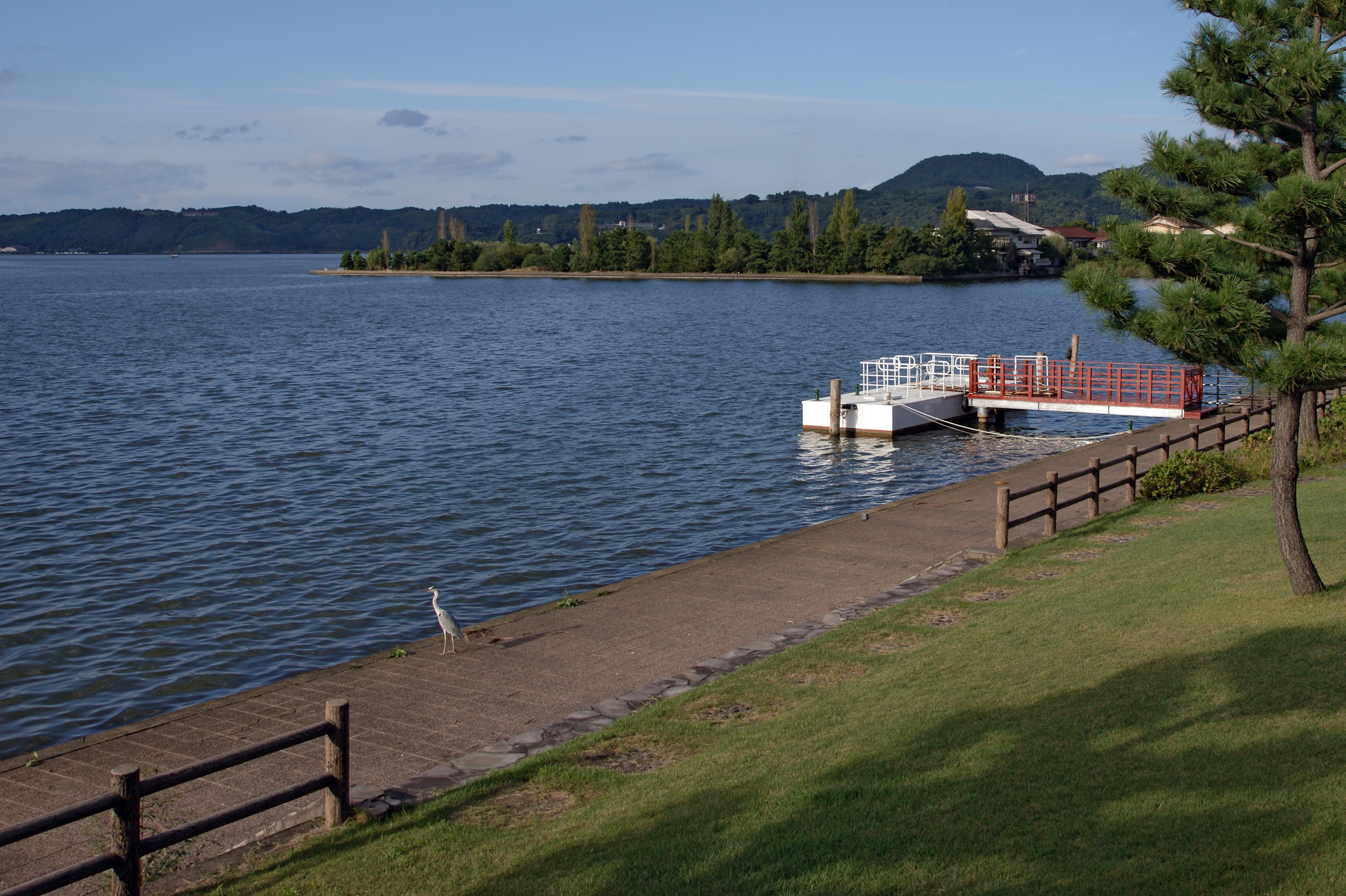
The bank of Tōgō Lake

Yurihama is located in central Tottori Prefecture, bordered by the Sea of Japan to the north. It is designated as a heavy snowfall area. The Hawai Plain lies within Yurihama, near the coastline and is a flat section of land stretching from the eastern bank of the Tenjin River to the environs of Lake Tōgō, and forms part of the greater Kurayoshi Plain. Many of the town's rice farming plots are located on the Hawai Plain. Besides this section of land, much of the inland areas within the town are mountainous.

Lake Tōgō Lake is a brackish lagoon, formed due to the sedimentation of the Tenjin River and the development of the Hōjō sand hills, cutting it off from the ocean. Natural hot springs with various temperatures occur in and around the lake itself.

=== Neighboring municipalities ===
Tottori Prefecture

- Hokuei
- Kurayoshi
- Misasa
- Tottori

== Climate ==
The climate in Yurihama is similar to other areas of Tottori and the wider Chugoku region. Summers are very warm and humid, with the town experiencing Japan's rainy season from early June to mid-July. This is followed by cooler autumn weather, and tropical cyclones occasionally pass close to the Chugoku region. Winters are typically cool; some years also bring heavy snowfall. Spring begins around March, and the daily temperature and sunlight hours gradually increase over the course of roughly three months. Yurihama is classified as a Humid subtropical climate (Köppen Cfa) characterized by warm summers and cold winters with heavy snowfall. The average annual temperature in Yurihama is 13.2 °C. The average annual rainfall is 2228 mm with September as the wettest month. The temperatures are highest on average in August, at around 24.7 °C, and lowest in January, at around 2.4 °C.

== Demography ==
Per Japanese census data, the population of Yurihama has been as follows. The population has been relatively steady since the 1970s.

Historical population
Year	Pop.	±%
1920	16,541	—
1930	17,598	+6.4%
1940	16,947	−3.7%
1950	21,741	+28.3%
1960	20,447	−6.0%
1970	17,776	−13.1%
1980	17,488	−1.6%
1990	17,309	−1.0%
2000	17,381	+0.4%
2010	17,037	−2.0%

== History ==
=== Early history ===
Numerous artifacts including haniwa clay figures and everyday items dated to the Kofun period were unearthed in the Nagase-Takahama area in modern-day Yurihama. Within the Nagase-Takahama archaeological site, the ruins of 200 homes, warehouses, and other structures, as well as over 300 kofun burial mounds were found. The haniwa figures uncovered here are recognized as Important Cultural Properties in Japan.

=== Later history ===
The land of modern-day Yurihama became part of Hōki Province in 645, as a result of the Taika reforms. Sometime after this, Shitori Shrine near Lake Tōgō was made ichinomiya of the province. Artifacts excavated from the shrine's Sutra mound date to the year 1103, and are collectively designated as a National Treasure.

Throughout the Sengoku Period, control of the region changed several times. In 1366, Ueshi Castle (ja) was built by the founder of the Nanjō clan in the south of modern-day Yurihama. The castle and surrounding areas were an important part of the eastern Hōki during this period, facing invasions by the Amago clan from the neighboring Izumo, among others. The castle frequently changed ownership for nearly 300 years before being abandoned in 1600 around the end of the Sengoku Period. Its ruins lay on a hill in Yurihama, and the area is now designated as a Prefectural Historic Site.

As with all of Hōki Province, the area was part of the holdings of a branch of the Ikeda clan, daimyō of Tottori Domain under the Edo period Tokugawa shogunate. Following the Meiji restoration, the area was organized into villages within Tōhaku District, Tottori Prefecture on April 1, 1896. Yurihama was created on October 1, 2004, after a merger of the towns of Hawai and Tōgō, and the village of Tomari.

=== Etymology ===
The name "Yurihama" (湯梨浜) highlights three features of the town. The first kanji character, 湯 (yu), means "hot water" and refers to the hot springs around Lake Tōgō. The second character, 梨 (ri), means "pear", for the Nashi pears grown in the area. The last character, 浜 (hama), means "beach" and refers to Yurihama's sandy beaches.

== Government ==
Yurihama has a mayor-council form of government with a directly elected mayor and a unicameral town council of 12 members. Yurihama, collectively with the other municipalities of Tōhaku District, contributes three members to the Tottori Prefectural Assembly. In terms of national politics, the town is part of Tottori 1st district of the lower house of the Diet of Japan.

== Economy ==
The economy of Yurihama is based agriculture and commercial fishing. A large volume of Nashi pears and other agricultural products are produced in Yurihama; in 2006, it was one of the top ten largest exporters of pears in Japan.

== Education ==
Yurihama has three public elementary schools and two public junior high schools operated by the town government, and one public high school operated by the Tottori Prefectural Board of Education.

== Transportation ==
=== Railway ===
JR West - San'in Line

- Tomari - Matsuzaki

=== Highways ===
- National Route 9
- National Route 179

== Sister cities ==
- Hawaii County, Hawaii, United States, since 1996

== Local attractions ==
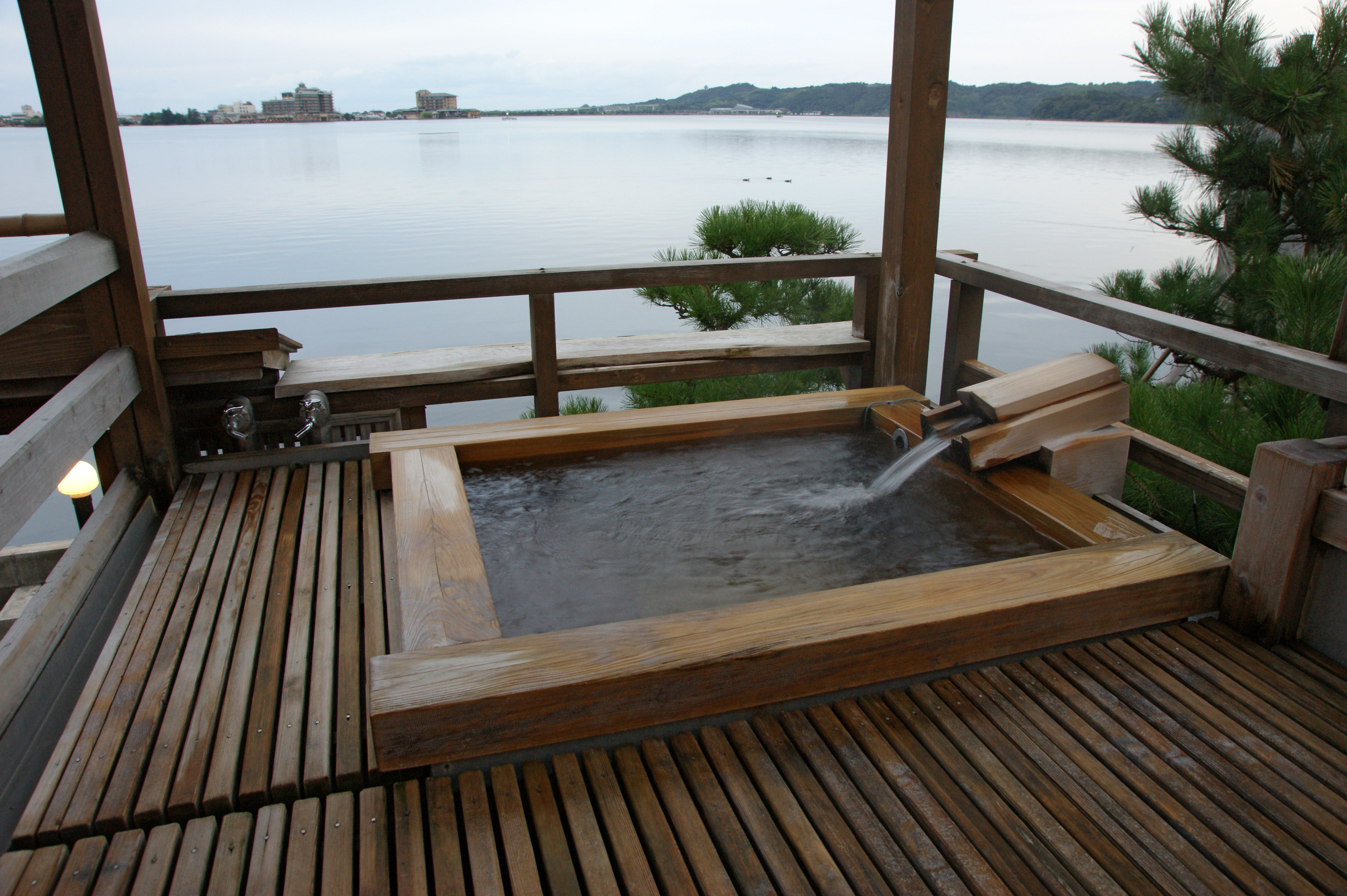
Tōgō Onsen

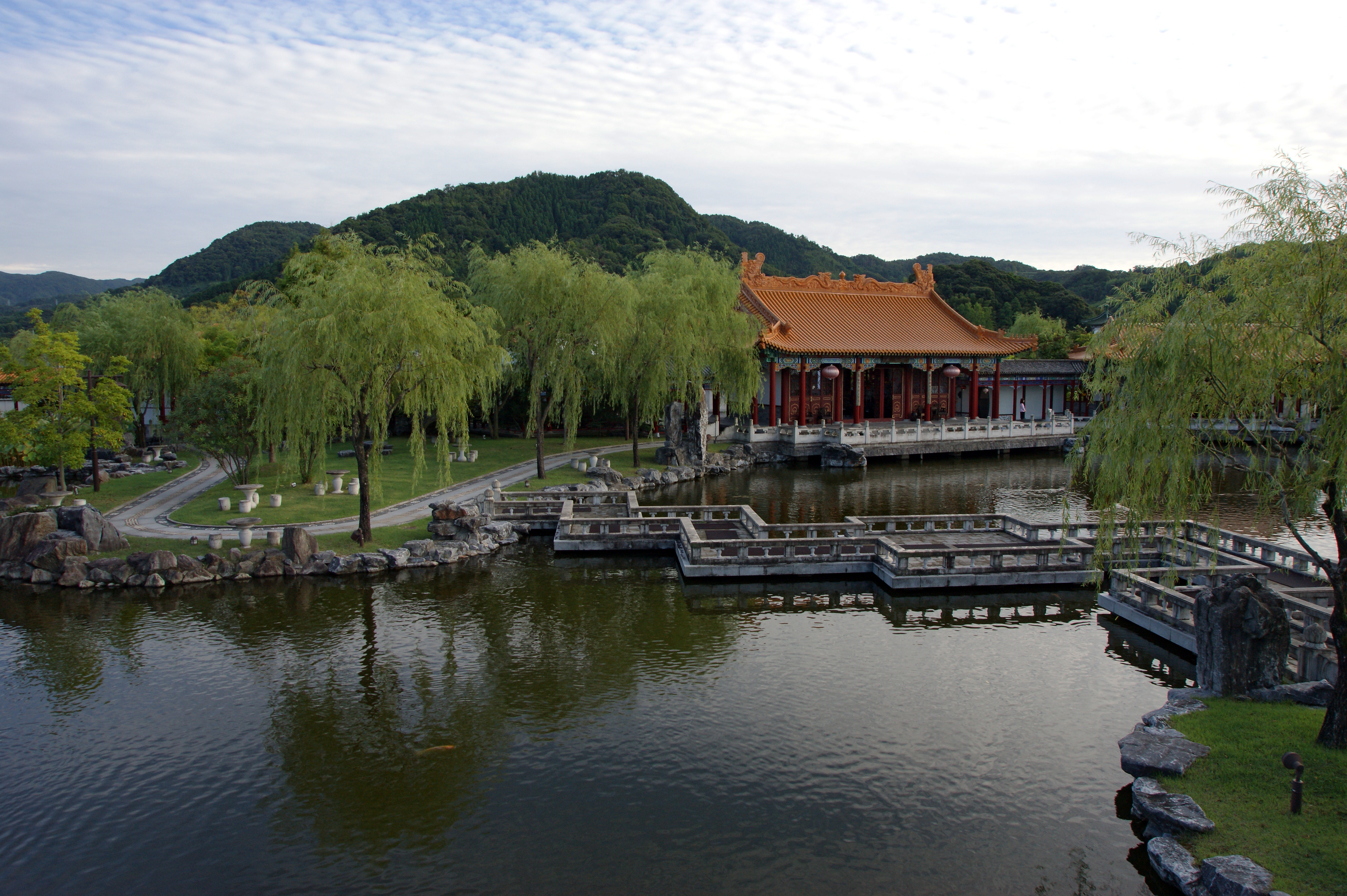
Enchō-en Chinese Garden

- Enchō-en Chinese Garden

A large Chinese garden constructed as a gesture of friendship between Tottori Prefecture and Hebei Province in China. It was built in China, then brought to Yurihama in several pieces before being remade by Chinese craftsmen.

- Fudō-taki (waterfall)

A 32-meter high natural waterfall.

- Hawai Onsen

A popular onsen hot spring resort area near Lake Tōgō with roughly 122,000 visitors per year.

- Tōgō Onsen

Another popular hot spring destination near Lake Tōgō, with roughly 26,000 visitors per year to its hotels and baths.

- Shitori Shrine (Shinto shrine)
- Ueshi-jō (castle ruins)

=== Festivals and events ===
Yurihama holds several events which attract participants from across Japan and from overseas. One example is the Hawaiian Festival, which celebrates Hawaiian culture and the sister city relations between Hawaii County and Yurihama. The Festival includes a hula tournament with participating groups from across Japan, as well as performances and cultural workshops by artists from Hawaii. A similar event is the Aloha Carnival, which features Hawaii-inspired food stalls, standup paddle boarding, raffles, and more.

Yurihama is also the venue for the annual Lake Tōgō Dragon Canoe Tournament, one of several dragon boat races held in Japan. Participants row eleven-meter long canoes decorated with colorful dragon heads.

== Sports ==
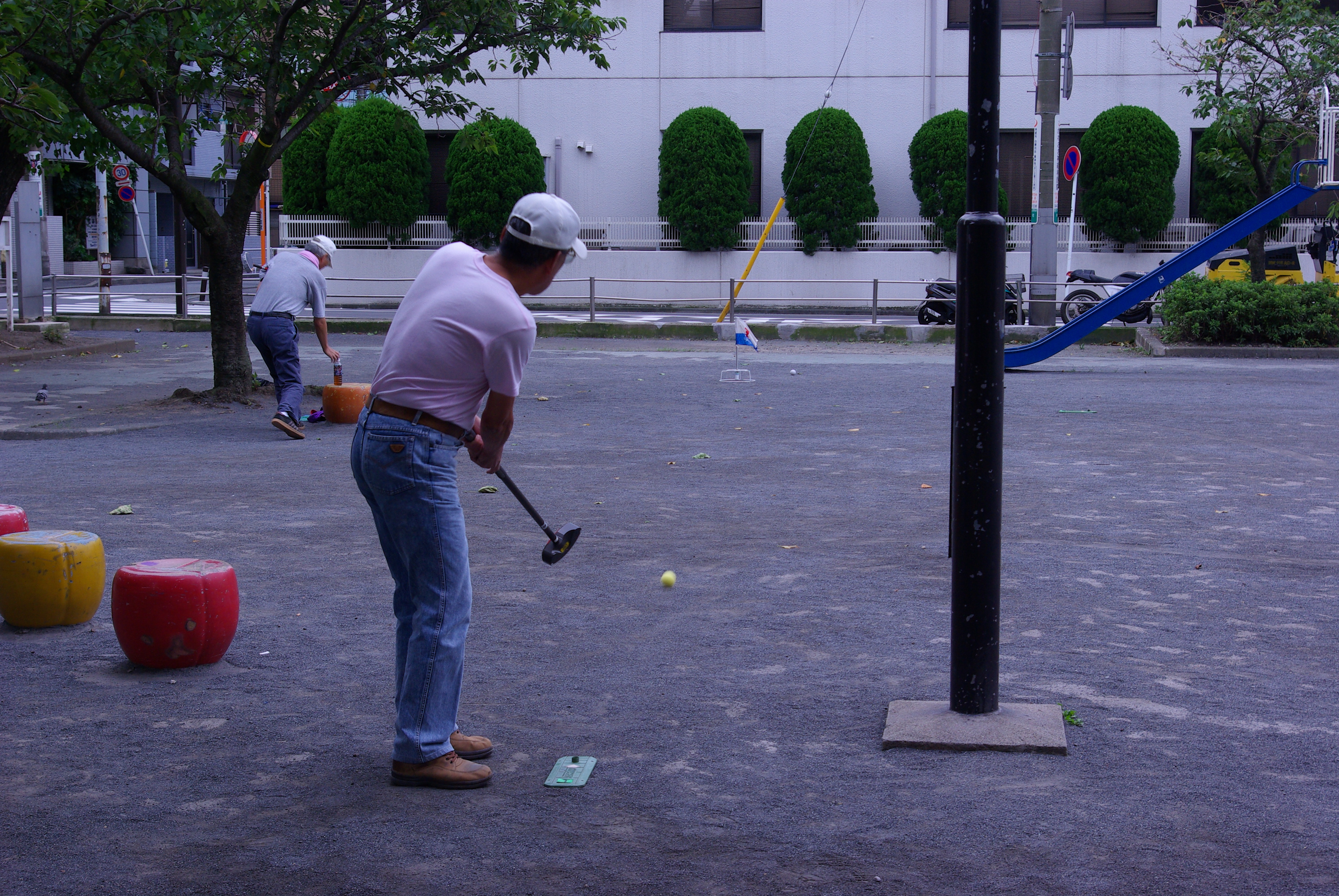
Ground golf

=== Ground golf ===
Ground golf was invented in Yurihama (specifically, in the pre-merger village of Tomari) in 1982. It is a sport similar to miniature golf. Ground golf now has over 155,000 players registered to clubs throughout Japan, and is also played abroad. Yurihama hosts international ground golf tournaments annually, and in 2019 the tournament attracted participants from eight different countries.
