= Matsuzaki Station (Tottori) =

Railway station in Yurihama, Tottori Prefecture, Japan

Matsuzaki Station 松崎駅
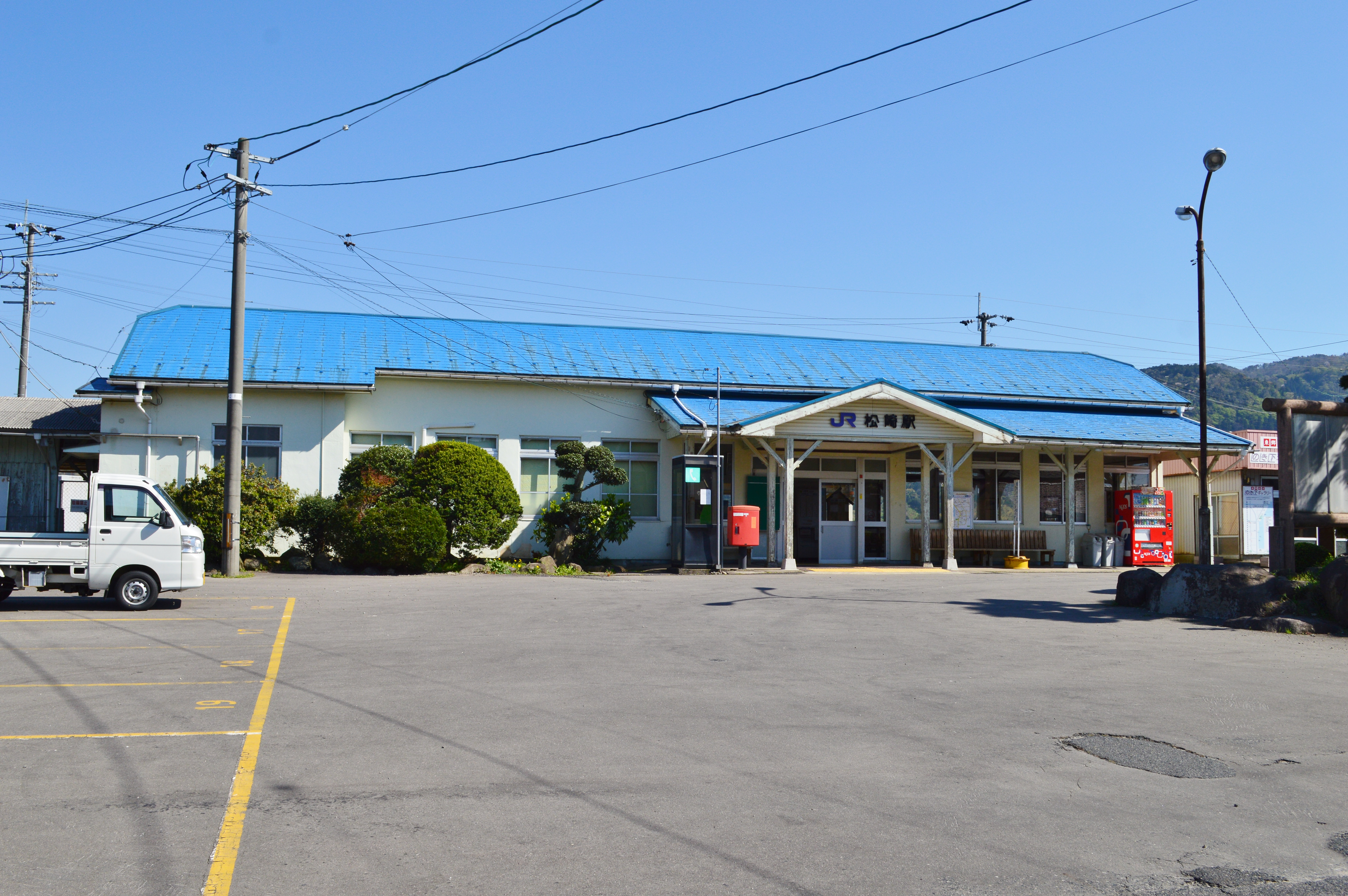
- Matsuzaki Station, April 2017

General information
- Location: 388, Ōaza Chūkōji Aza Matsubara, Yurihama-cho, Tōhaku-gun, Tottori-ken 689-0712; Japan
- Coordinates: 35°28′7.63″N 133°54′7.16″E
- Operator: JR West
- Line: San'in Main Line
- Distance: 264.6 km (164.4 miles) from Kyoto
- Platforms: 2 side platforms
- Tracks: 2

Construction
- Structure type: At grade

Other information
- Status: Unstaffed
- Website: Official website

History
- Opened: 15 March 1904

Passengers
- 2018: 420 daily

Services
Preceding station	JR West	Following station
Kurayoshi towards Yonago	San'in Line Local	Tomari towards Kinosaki-Onsen
Kurayoshi towards Yonago	San'in Line Tottori Liner	Tomari towards Kinosaki-Onsen
Location
- Location within Tottori Prefecture Location within Japan

Matsuzaki Station (松崎駅, Matsuzaki-eki) is a passenger railway station located in the town of Yurihama, Tōhaku District, Tottori Prefecture, Japan. It is operated by the West Japan Railway Company (JR West).

== Lines ==
Matsuzaki Station is served by the San'in Main Line, and is located 264.6 kilometers from the terminus of the line at Kyoto.

== Station layout ==
The station consists of one ground-level side platform and one island platform connected by a footbridge to the station building. However, from 2003 the outer track (Track 3) on the island platform was removed, making the station effectively a two side platform configuration. Platform 2 on the former island platform is used only for passing limited express trains, and as a general rule, trains that stop in both directions use Platform 1 on the side of the station building. The station is unattended.

=== Platforms ===
1	■ San'in Main Line	for Hamasaka and Tottori for Kurayoshi and Yonago
2	■ San'in Main Line	for Kurayoshi and Yonago

== History ==
Matsuzaka Station opened on March 15, 1904. With the privatization of the Japan National Railways (JNR) on April 1, 1987, the station came under the aegis of the West Japan Railway Company. A new station building was completed in July 2022.

== Passenger statistics ==
In fiscal 2018, the station was used by an average of 420 passengers daily.

== Surrounding area ==
- Lake Tōgō
- Yurihama Town Office Tōgō Office

== See also ==
- List of railway stations in Japan
