= Daiei, Tottori =

Daiei 大栄町 だいえいちょう
- Town
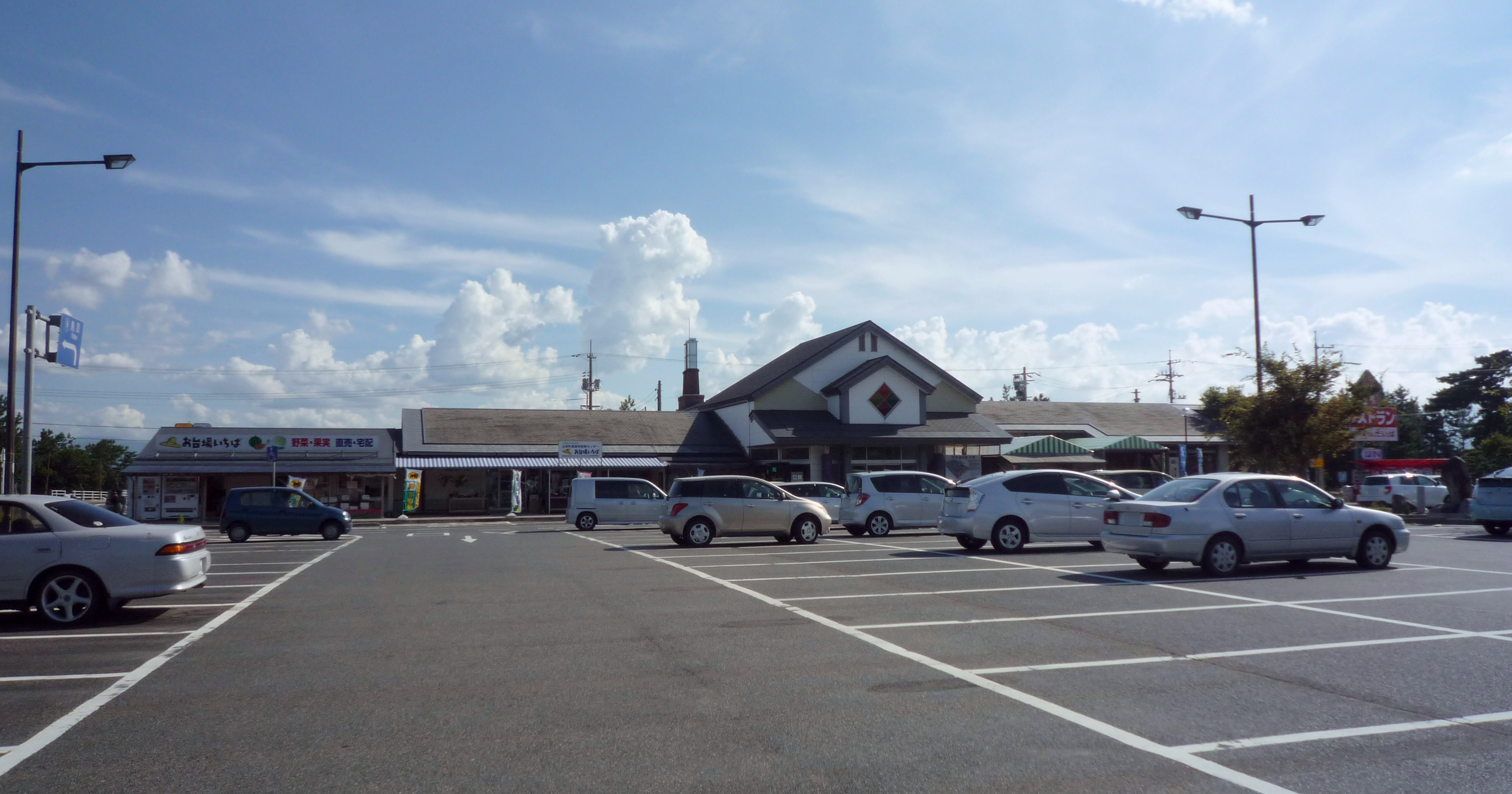
- Daiei Roadside Station

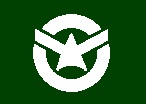
- Flag Seal
- Interactive map of Daiei
- Country: Japan
- Region: Chūgoku (San'in)
- Prefecture: Tottori
- District: Tōhaku
- Merged: October 1, 2005

Area
  - Total: 36.23 km^{2} (13.99 sq mi)

Population (2004)
  - Total: 9,026
  - Density: 249.1/km^{2} (645.2/sq mi)

Daiei (大栄町, Daiei-chō) was a town located in Tōhaku District, Tottori Prefecture, Japan.

As of 2003, the town had an estimated population of 8,800 and a population density of 242.89 per km^{2}. The total area was 36.23 km^{2}.

On October 1, 2005, Daiei, along with the town of Hōjō (also from Tōhaku District), was merged to create the town of Hokuei.

Daiei is also the hometown of Japanese manga artist Gosho Aoyama, best known for his manga series Case Closed.
