= Tomari, Tottori =

Dissolved municipality in Tottori prefecture, Japan

Tomari (泊村, Tomari-son) was a village located in Tōhaku District, Tottori Prefecture, Japan.

As of 2003, the village had an estimated population of 3,036 and a density of 208.52 persons per km^{2}. The total area was 14.56 km^{2}.

On October 1, 2004, Tomari, along with the towns of Hawai and Tōgō (all from Tōhaku District), was merged to create the town of Yurihama.
