= Hawai, Tottori =

Dissolved municipality in Tōhaku district, Tottori prefecture, Japan

Hawai (羽合町, Hawai-chō) was a town located in Tōhaku District, Tottori Prefecture, Japan.

As of 2003, the town had an estimated population of 8,011 and a population density of 655.03 persons per km^{2}. The total area was 12.23 km^{2}.

On October 1, 2004, Hawai, along with the town of Tōgō, and the village of Tomari (all from Tōhaku District), was merged to create the town of Yurihama.
