= Tōhaku District =

District in Tottori Prefecture, Japan

Coordinates: 35°29′N 133°46′E

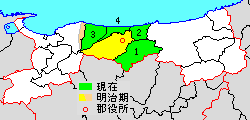
Location of Tōhaku District in Tottori Prefecture

Tōhaku (東伯郡, Tōhaku-gun) is a district located in Tottori Prefecture, Japan.

As of 2003, the district has an estimated population of 65,944 and a density of 109.54 persons per km^{2}. The total area is 602.02 km^{2}.

== Towns and villages ==
- Hokuei
- Kotoura
- Misasa
- Yurihama

== Mergers ==
- On September 1, 2004, the towns of Tōhaku and Akasaki merged to form the new town of Kotoura.
- On October 1, 2004, the towns of Hawai and Tōgō and the village of Tomari merged to form the new town of Yurihama.
- On March 22, 2005, the town of Sekigane merged into the city of Kurayoshi.
- On October 1, 2005, the towns of Daiei and Hōjō merged to form the new town of Hokuei.
