= Lake Tōgō =

Lake in Japan

Lake Tōgō 東郷池
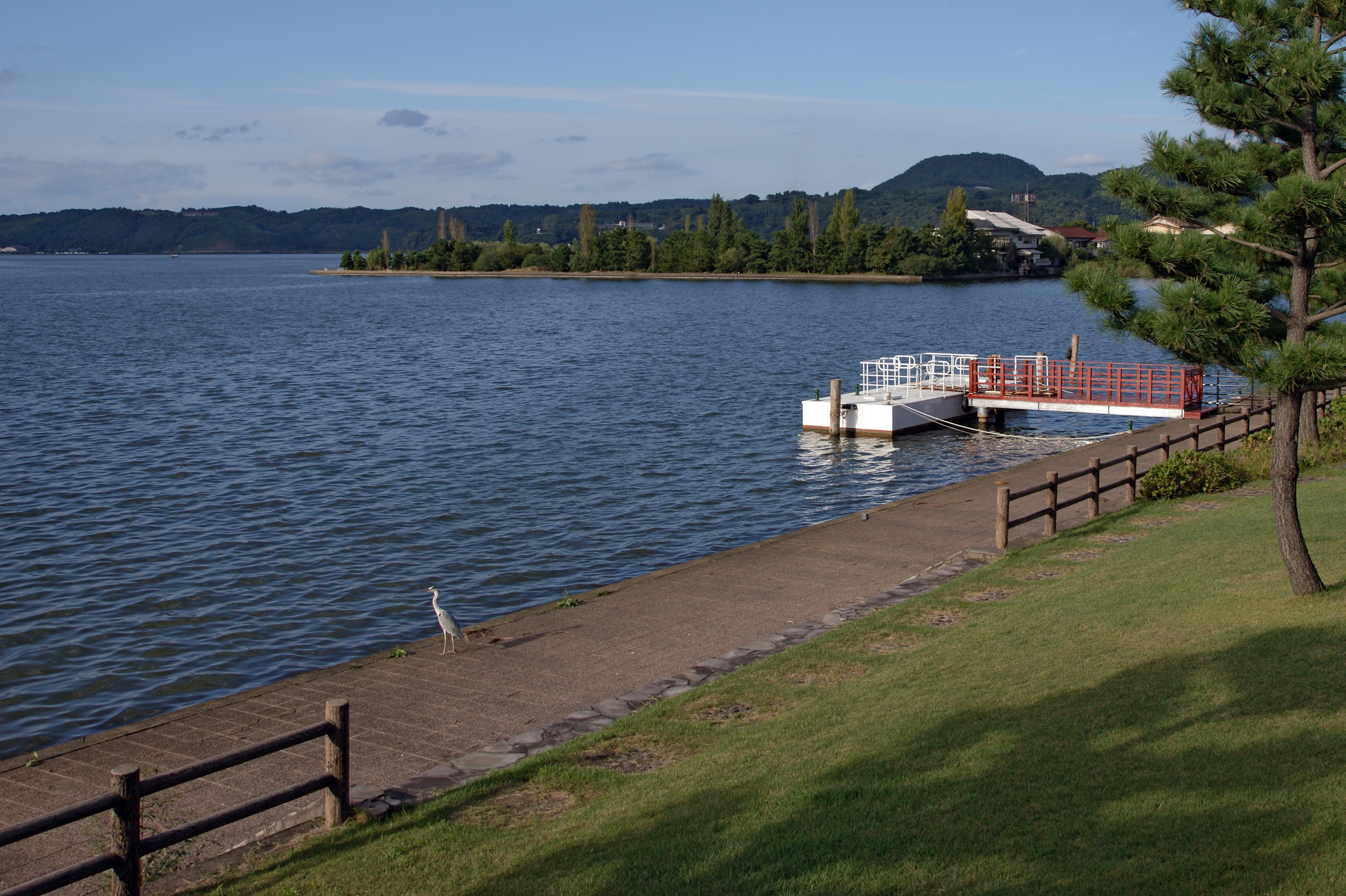
- Lake Tōgō

- Location within Tottori Prefecture Location within Japan
- Coordinates: 35.4764°N 133.8939°E
- Basin countries: Japan
- Surface area: 4.1 km^{2} (1.6 sq mi)
- Max. depth: 2.5 m (8 ft 2 in)
- Shore length^{1}: 10.1 km (6.3 mi)
- Surface elevation: 0 km (0 mi)
- Settlements: Yurihama, Tottori Prefecture
- ^{1} Shore length is not a well-defined measure.

Lake Tōgō (東郷池, Tōgō-ike) is a brackish lake located in the town of Yurihama, Tottori Prefecture in the San'in Region of Japan. It has a circumference of 12 kilometers and is separated from the Sea of Japan by a narrow coastal strip.

Lake Tōgō was a cove in ancient Japan that gradually became separated from the sea by sedimentation to become a lake. It is now connected to the Sea of Japan through Hashizu River, which is about 2 kilometers long. The lake has a number of hot springs on its bed and around its circumference. The area has been inhabited since prehistoric times, and the Hashizu Kofun Cluster located between the lake and the sea is believed to have belonged to the local ruling family that ruled the port during the Kofun period. Also in the area are a number of onsen resorts.
