= List of mergers in Tottori Prefecture =

This is a list of municipal mergers in Tottori Prefecture, Japan since the Heisei era. These mergers were part of the "Great Heisei mergers".

== Mergers from April 1, 1999 to Present ==
- On September 1, 2004 - the towns of Akasaki and Tōhaku (both from Tōhaku District) were merged to create the town of Kotoura.
- On October 1, 2004 - the towns of Aimi and Saihaku (both from Saihaku District) were merged to create the town of Nanbu.
- On October 1, 2004 - the towns of Hawai and Tōgō, and the village of Tomari (all from Tōhaku District) were merged to create the town of Yurihama.
- On November 1, 2004 - the town of Kokufu, the village of Fukube (both from Iwami District), the towns of Aoya, Ketaka and Shikano (all from Ketaka District), the towns of Kawahara and Mochigase and the village of Saji (all from Yazu District) were merged into the expanded city of Tottori. Ketaka District was dissolved as a result of this merger.
- On January 1, 2005 - the town of Mizokuchi (from Hino District), and the town of Kishimoto (from Saihaku District) were merged to create the town of Hōki (in Saihaku District).
- On March 22, 2005 - the town of Sekigane (from Tōhaku District) was merged into the expanded city of Kurayoshi.
- On March 28, 2005 - the towns of Nakayama and Nawa (both from Saihaku District) were merged into the expanded town of Daisen.
- On March 31, 2005 - the towns of Funaoka, Hattō and Kōge (all from Yazu District) were merged to create the town of Yazu.
- On March 31, 2005 - the town of Yodoe (from Saihaku District) was merged into the expanded city of Yonago.
- On October 1, 2005 - the towns of Daiei and Hōjō (both from Tōhaku District) were merged to create the town of Hokuei.
