= Nishi Inaba Prefectural Natural Park =

Natural park of Tottori prefecture, Japan

- 西因幡県立自然公園
- Location within Japan
- Location: Tottori Prefecture, Japan
- Coordinates: 35°02′04″N 134°00′28″E
- Area: 21.55 km^{2} (8.32 sq mi)
- Established: 8 May 1984

Nishi Inaba Prefectural Natural Park (西因幡県立自然公園, Nishi Inaba kenritsu shizen kōen) is a Prefectural Natural Park in Tottori Prefecture, Japan. Established in 1984 and expanded in 1987, the park comprises part of the coast and three inland areas of the expanded city of Tottori (former towns of Aoya, Ketaka, and Shikano).

== See also ==
- National Parks of Japan
