= Ketaka District, Tottori =

Former district in Tottori prefecture, Japan

Ketaka (気高郡, Ketaka-gun) was a district located in Tottori Prefecture, Japan.

As of 2003, the district had an estimated population of 22,283 and a density of 143.75 persons per km^{2}. The total area was 155.01 km^{2}.

== Former towns and villages ==
- Aoya
- Ketaka
- Shikano

== Merger ==
- On November 1, 2004 - the towns of Aoya, Ketaka and Shikano, along with the town of Kokufu, the village of Fukube (both from Iwami District), the towns of Kawahara and Mochigase and the village of Saji (all from Yazu District) were merged into the expanded city of Tottori. Ketaka District was dissolved as a result of this merger.
