= Inshū dialect =

Japanese dialect of the Inaba region

- 因州弁
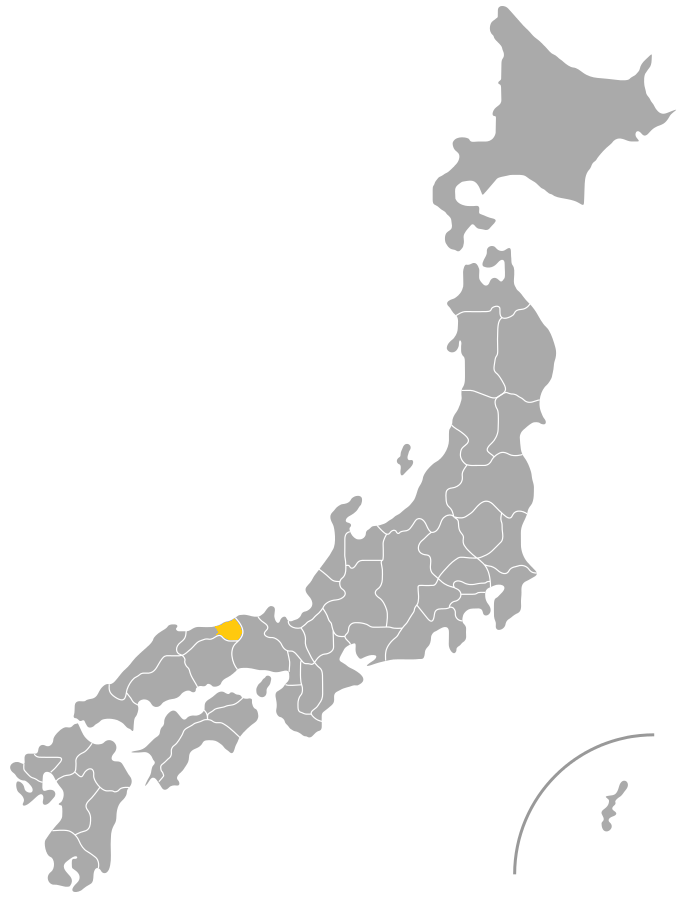
- Inshū dialect area.
- Native to: Japan
- Region: Tottori Prefecture
- Language family: Japanese: Western; Chūgoku; East San'in; Inshū dialect

Language codes
- ISO 639-3: –
- Glottolog: tott1237

The Inshū dialect (Japanese: 因州弁 inshū-ben) is a dialect of Japanese spoken in eastern Tottori Prefecture, southwest Japan. It is also called the Tottori dialect (Japanese: 鳥取弁 tottori-ben), although this can also refer generally to any dialect spoken in Tottori, of which there are several. It is similar to certain neighbouring dialects, such as the Kurayoshi dialect, and also to the Japanese spoken in parts of northern Hyogo. It takes its name from Inshu, the former province where the dialect emerged.

== History and classification ==
The Inshu dialect area formed based around Inshu (formally Inaba Province) which became modern Tottori Prefecture in the late 19th century.

It is part of the Chugoku group of dialects, spoken across southwestern Japan. It is specifically an East San'in dialect, related to the Kurayoshi, Tango and Tajima dialects.

== Phonology ==
In the San’in area (including Tottori) the long o (お) sound derived from the au (あう) diphthong of the Heian and Kamakura periods has morphed to a long a (あぁ). Consequently, the volitional/persuasive ikō (行こう let’s go) is pronounced ikā (行かあ) and the conjecture-expressing ~ darō (～だろう) becomes ~ darā (～だらあ). Although usually said as kauta (買うた) in San’yō dialects, katta (買った bought) becomes kāta (買あた) or simply remains the same. It's pitch accent is the chūrin (中輪 ‘middle ring’) Tokyo standard, a trait that can also be seen in the Kurayoshi dialect.

Although diphthong merging is virtually absent in Tottori City, it does occur in the former districts of Yazu and Iwami. In Yazu, the diphthong ai (あい) merges to an ē (えぇ) like in akai (赤い red) → akē (あけえ). In Iwami, ai merges instead to yā (ゃあ) like in akai (赤い red) → akyā (あきゃあ). Although almost non-existent elsewhere in Tottori, in the town of Chizu there is a phenomenon of merging the diphthong oi (おい) to ē (えぇ) like in kuroi (黒い black) → kure (くれえ).

In contrast to most other Western Japanese dialects and in kind with more distant groups such as the Kanto dialects, across Tottori there is frequent silencing of vowels. When unaccented, voiceless consonants (shi (し), ki (き), etc.) become silent.

== Grammar ==
As a San'in dialect, Inshū dialect speakers use ~ da (～だ) (as opposed to ~ja (～じゃ) in the San'yō dialects) as their copula. Nevertheless, in some towns that are close to Okayama Prefecture, such as Chizu and Wakasa, ~ja (～じゃ) is used instead. Within Tottori, the conjunctive forms of u-ending Godan verbs experience geminate consonant (small tsu っ) insertion, with euphonic change to u (う) only occurring in Chizu. For reason and cause, ~ (da) ke (～(だ)けー) is used as an equivalent to ~ (da) kara (～(だ)から because, so ). Like other San’in region dialects, ongoing actions and completed actions are expressed separately with ~yoru (～ょーる) and ~toru (～とる), respectively.
