= Tottori Domain Ikeda clan cemetery =

Cemetery in Tottori Prefecture, Japan

Coordinates: 35°29′5.9″N 134°16′9.0″E

- 鳥取藩主池田家墓所
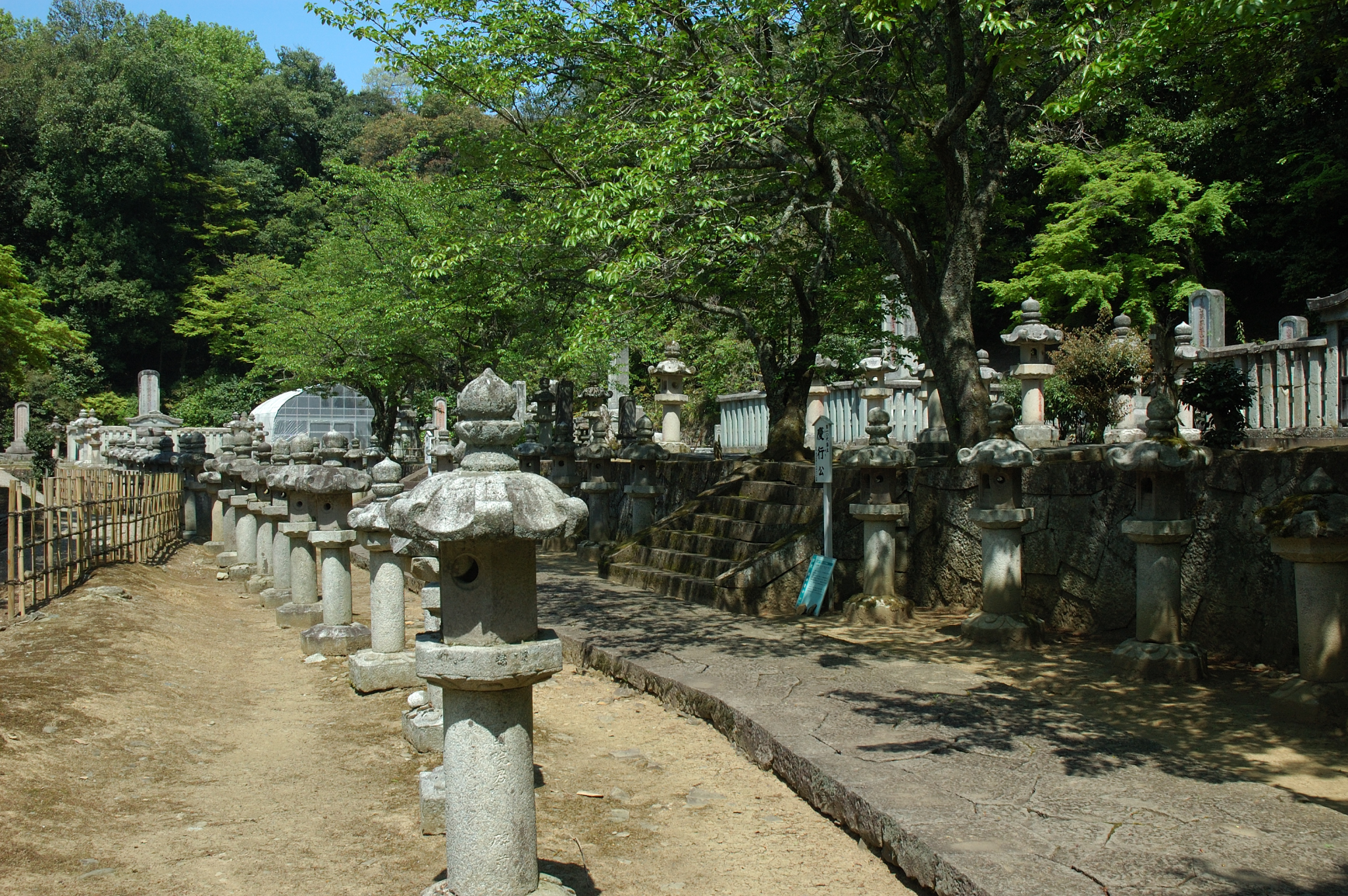
- Tottori Ikeda clan cemetery

Details
- Established: 1693
- Location: Tottori, Tottori Prefecture
- Country: Japan
- Type: daimyō cemetery
- Footnotes: National Historic Site of Japan
- Tottori Domain Ikeda clan cemetery (Tottori Prefecture) Tottori Domain Ikeda clan cemetery (Japan)

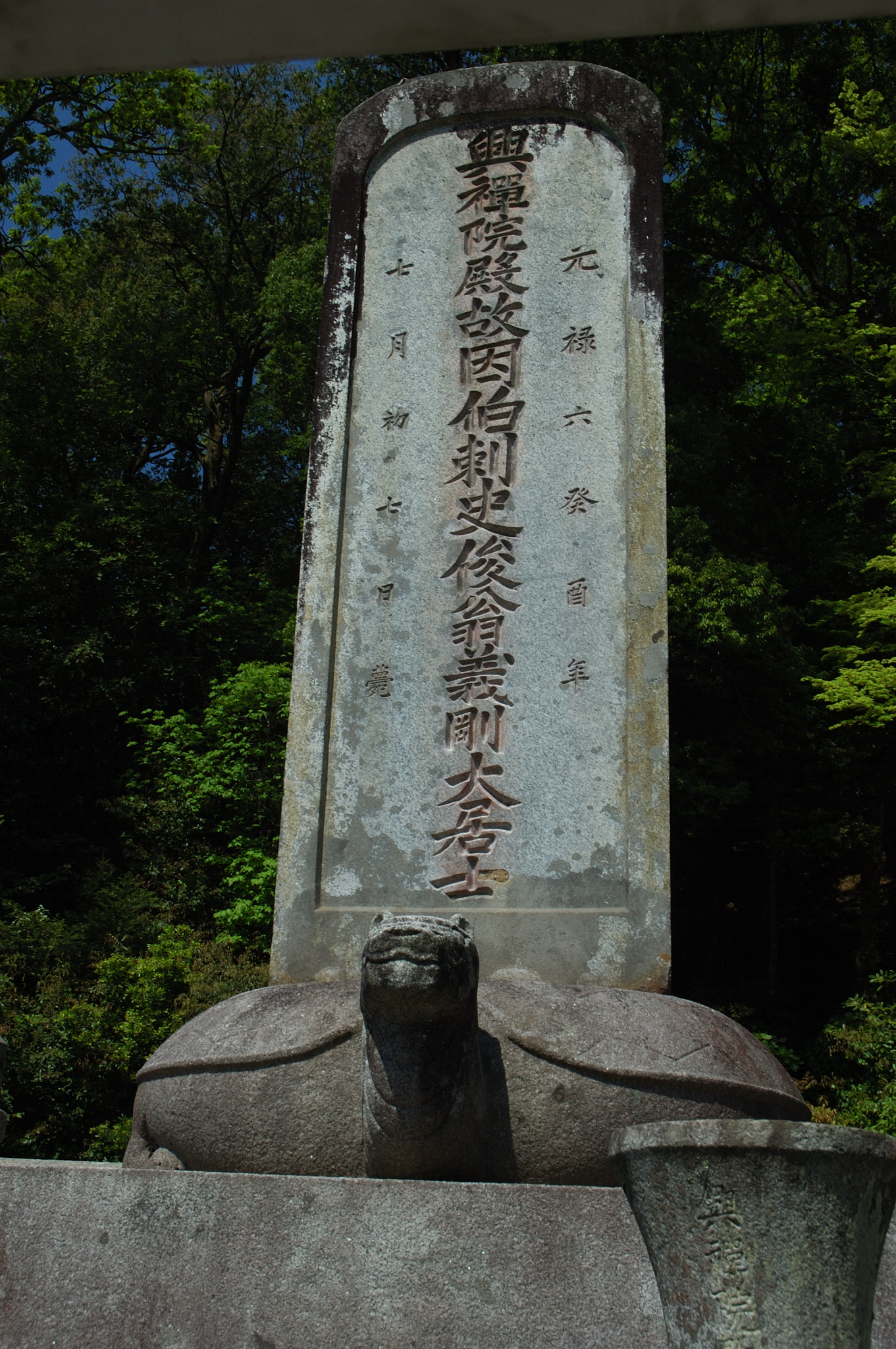
Grave of 1st daimyō, Ikeda Mitsunaka

The Tottori Domain Ikeda clan cemetery (鳥取藩主池田家墓所, Tottori-han-shu Ikeda-ke bosho) is located in the Kokufu neighborhood of the city of Tottori, Tottori Prefecture, Japan. The cemetery contains the graves of the successive daimyō of Tottori Domain. The cemetery was designated a National Historic Site in 1981.

== Overview ==
The Ikeda clan had been senior retainers of the Tokugawa clan and 1616 Ikeda Mitsumasa (the eldest son of Ikeda Toshitaka, the son of Ikeda Terumasa) was transferred from Himeji Domain to an expanded Tottori Domain (325,000 koku) which now included most of Inaba Province as well as Hōki Province. During his 16-year tenure, he built the foundations of the castle town of Tottori. In 1632, when his uncle Ikeda Tadao, of Okayama Domain died, Mitsumasa exchanged Tottori for Okayama and the clan chieftaincy. Ikeda Tadao's son, Ikeda Mitsunaka became daimyō of Tottori at the age of two, and his descendants would continue to rule the domain to the end of the Edo period. Although the Ikeda clan of Tottori was reduced to a branch of the clan, it was Ikeda Tadao's lineage which was in direct descent from Ikeda Terumasa and Tokuhime, Tokugawa Ieyasu's second daughter, so the Ikeda clan of Tottori was regarded by the Tokugawa shogunate as a kunimochi daimyō clan independent of the head of the Ikeda family of Okayama Domain. Although technically a tozama daimyo clan, this connection gave the Tottori-Ikeda clan status equivalent to a (shinpan clan.

When Ikeda Mitsunaka, died in 1693 at the age of 64 and was buried in this graveyard, which is near the ichinomiya of Inaba Province, Ube Jinja. All successive daimyō of Tottori followed, with the exception of the final daimyō, Ikeda Yoshihide, who was buried in Tokyo. In addition, the graves of concubines and branch families were collected from temples in the city at the beginning of the twentieth century, and the cemetery contains 78 graves of various sizes and many stone lanterns arranged in an orderly manner. These include the daimyō of the sub-domains of Shikano Domain and Wakasa Domain.

The tombs of each daimyō is surrounded by a tuff fence and takes the form of the bixi a tortoise-shaped base stone and a flat monument, both made of granite. Each is about 4.6 meters tall. As a general rule, only the name is engraved on the tombstone, although that of Ikeda Mitsunaka has his achievements written on the back of the stone. The other daimyō had their achievement engraved on a copper plate which was entombed with their body. One exception is that of the 2nd daimyō Ikeda Tsunekiyo, whose monument lacks the tortoise base. It is said that this was done out of consideration of Tokugawa Tsunayoshi's infamous "Shōrui Awaremi no Rei" laws forbidding cruelty to animals.

The cemetery was initially under the control of a Buddhist chapel called Sengaku-an. It was subsequently elevated to a temple and renamed Seigen-ji, and was a branch of Kozen-ji, the bodaiji of the Tottori-Ikeda clan. The temple was abandoned at the start of the Meiji period. Each of the daimyō graves also had a karamon gate and memorial chapel, but these were also removed in the early Meiji period due to deterioration.

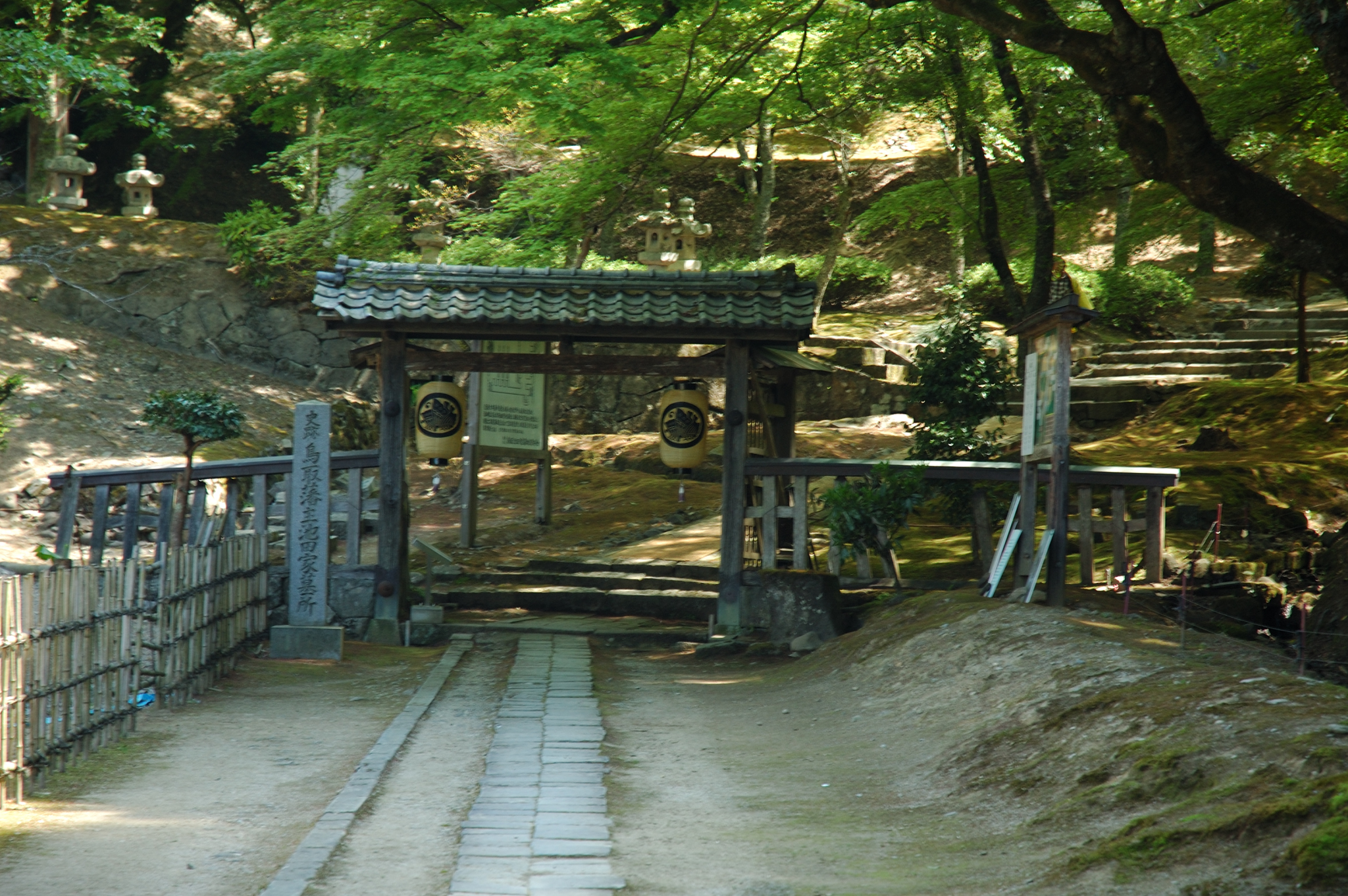
Entrance

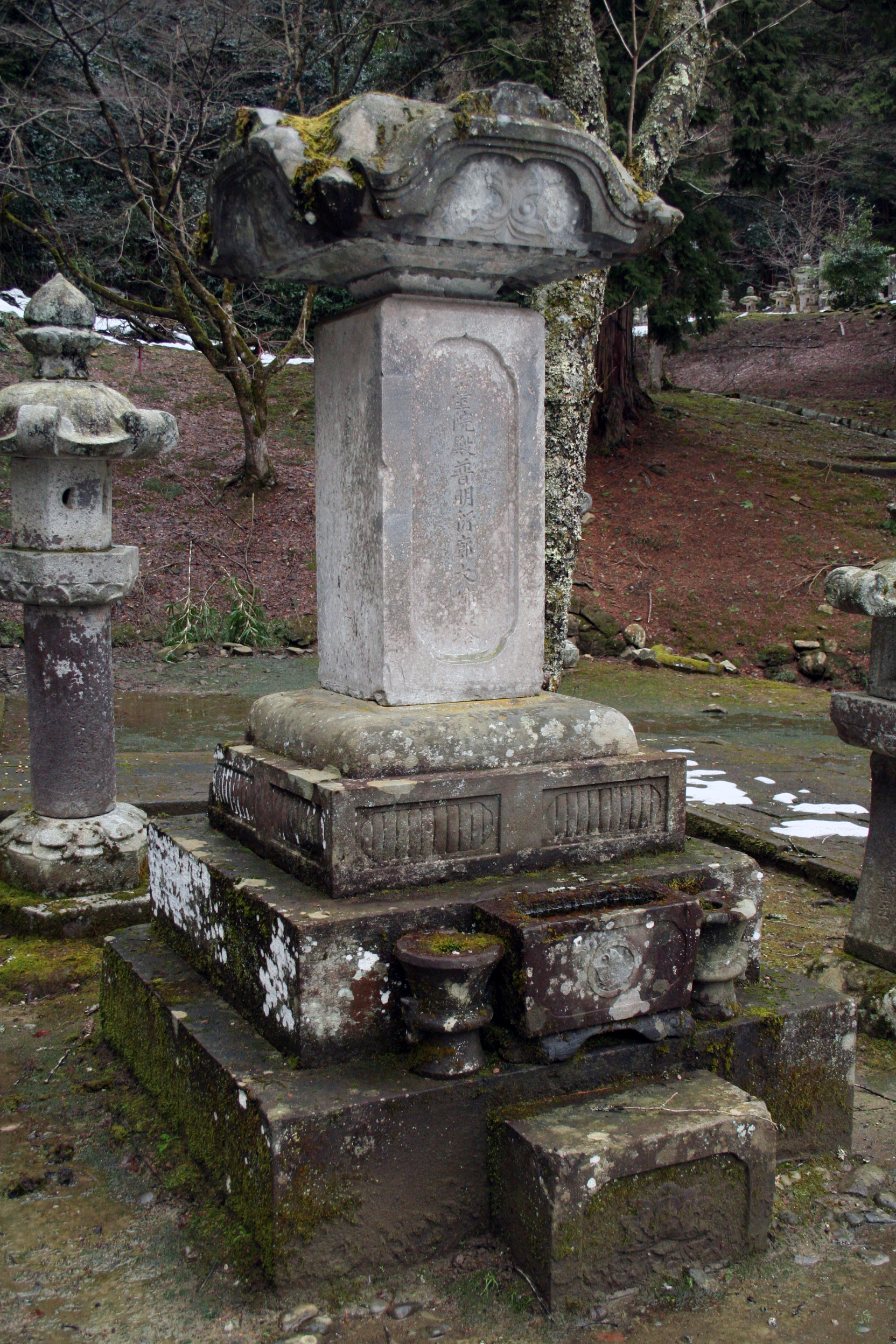
Grave of Takahime, wife of Ikeda Yoshiyasu Ikeda, 3rd daimyō

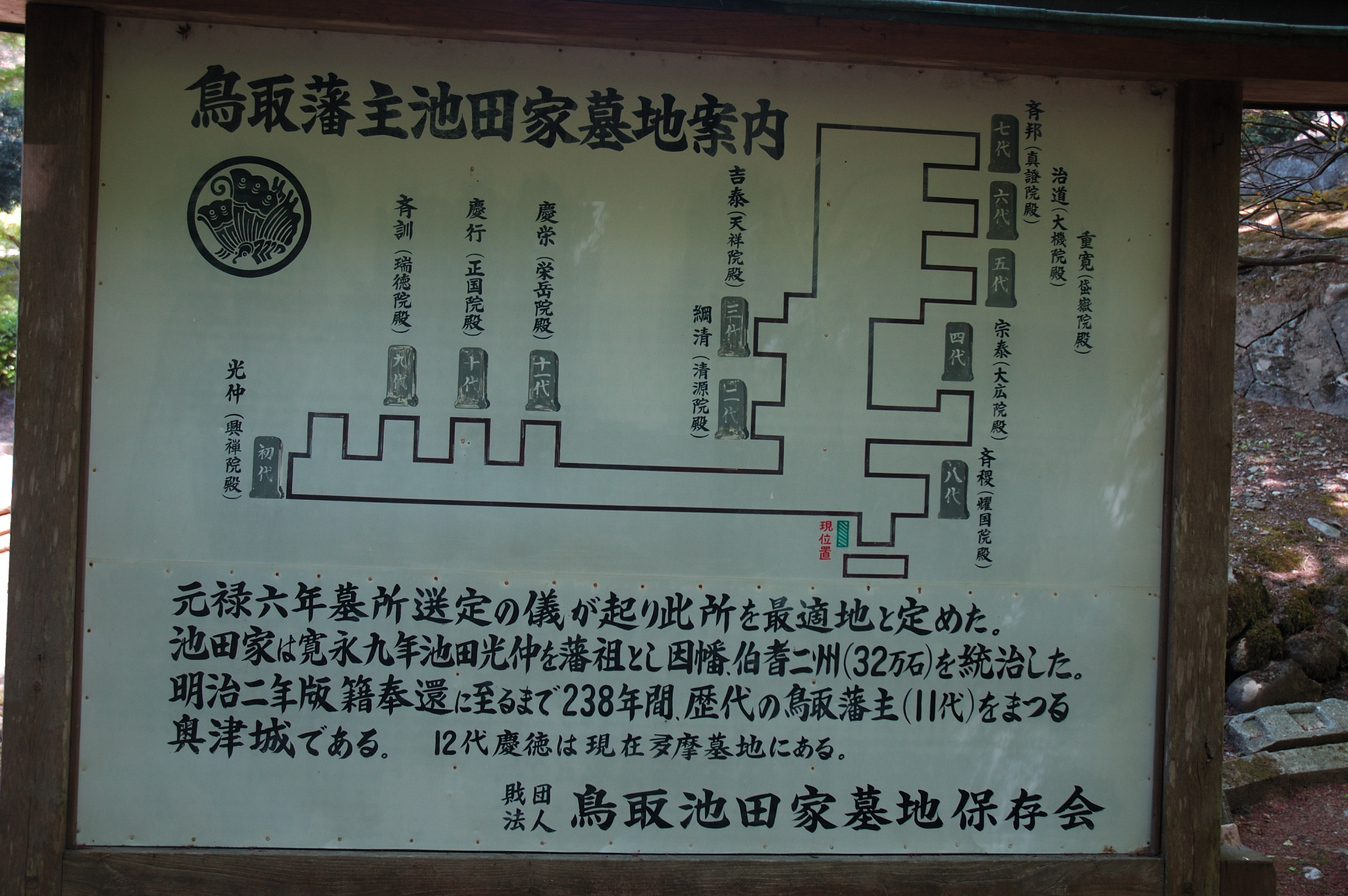
Layout map

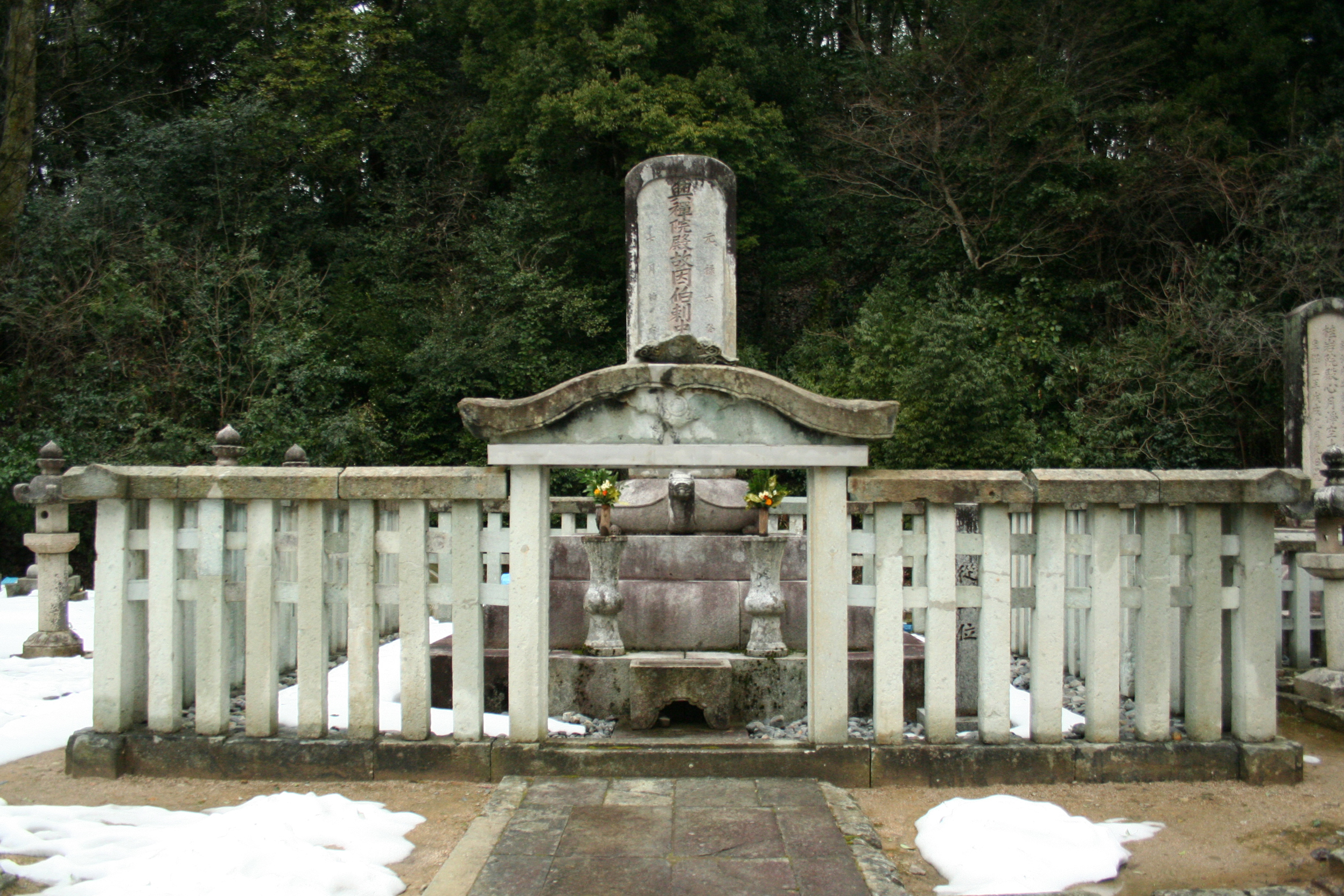
Grave of 1st daimyō, Ikeda Mitsunaka

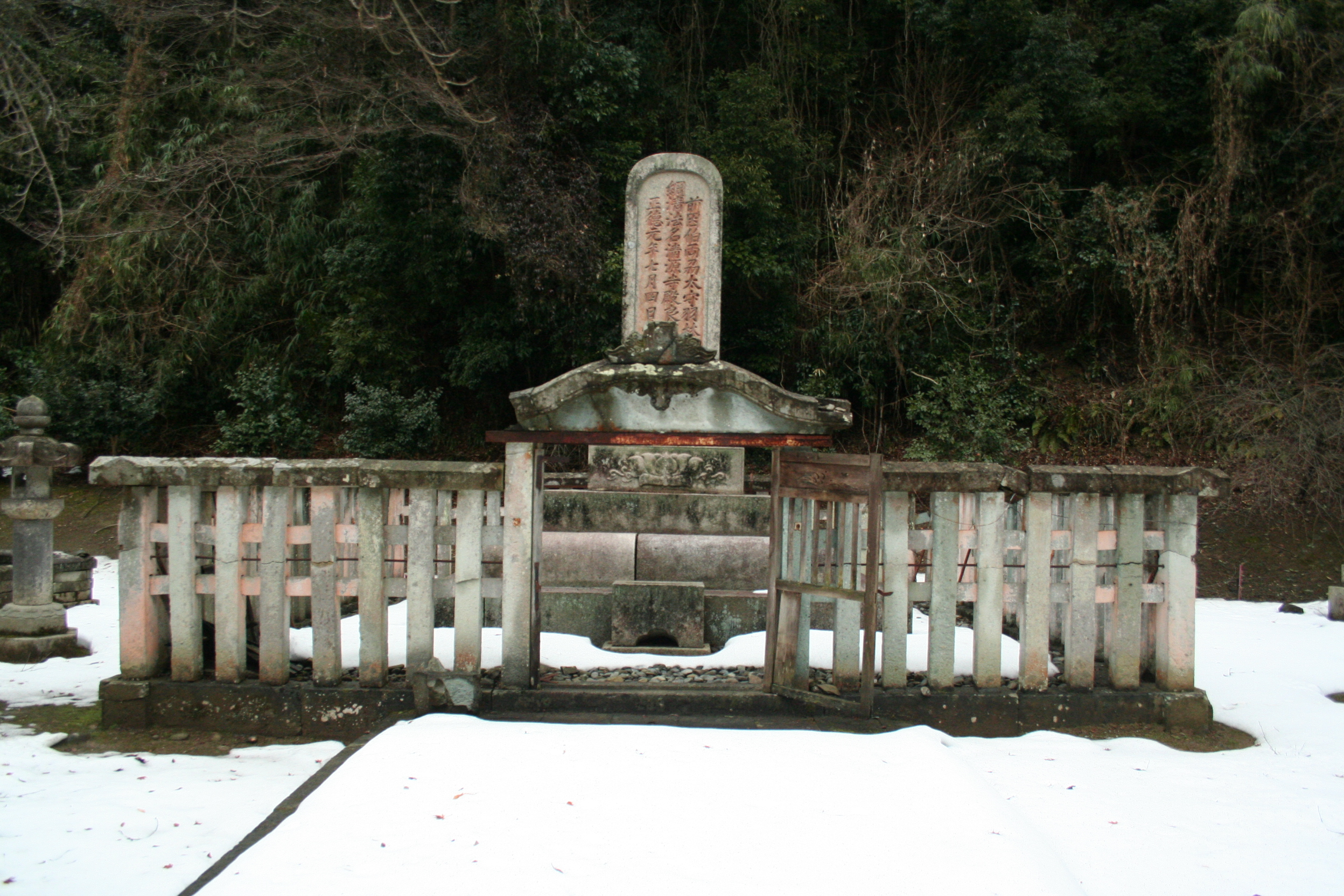
Grave of 2nd daimyō, Ikeda Tsunakiyo

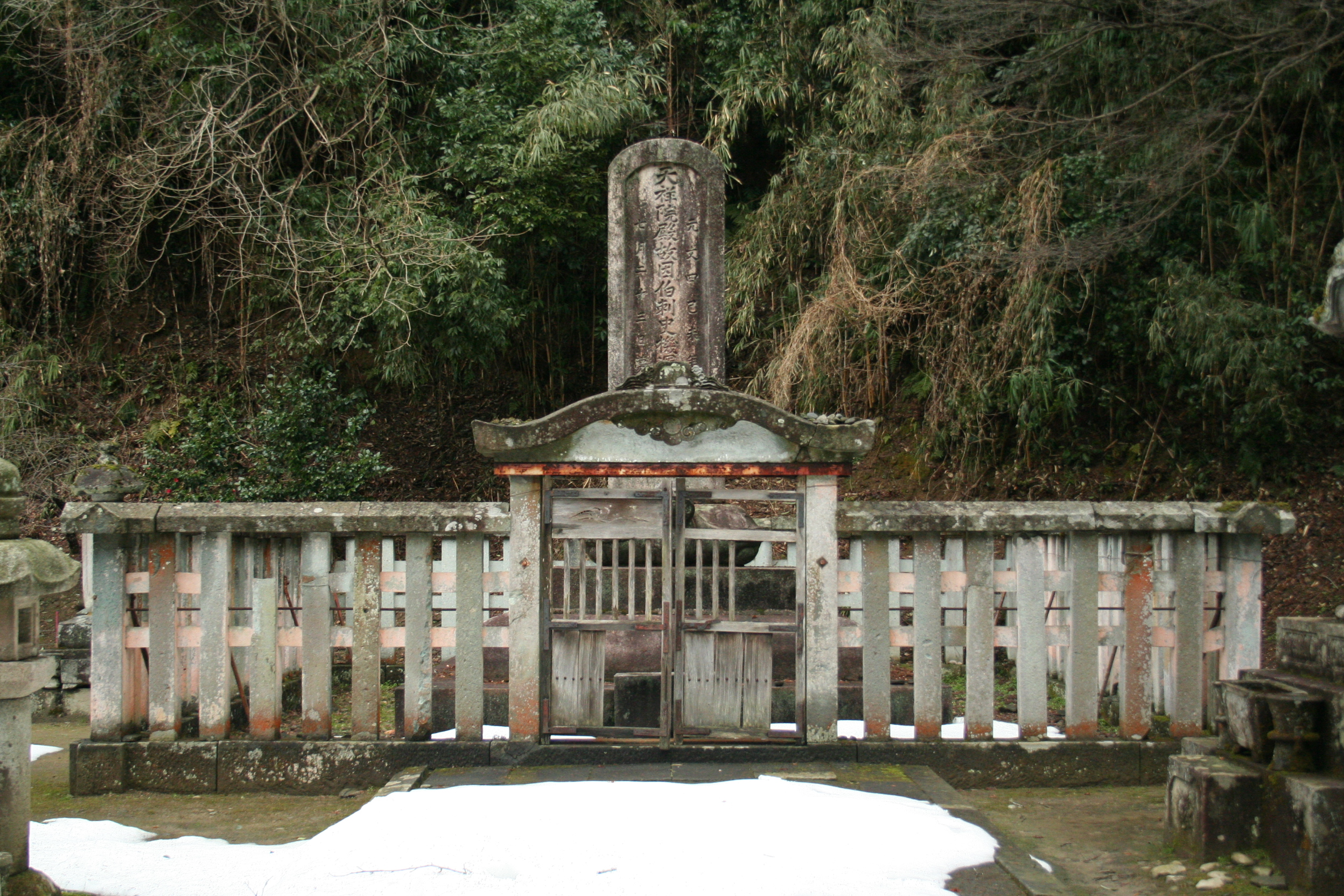
Grave of 3rd daimyō, Ikeda Yoshiyasu

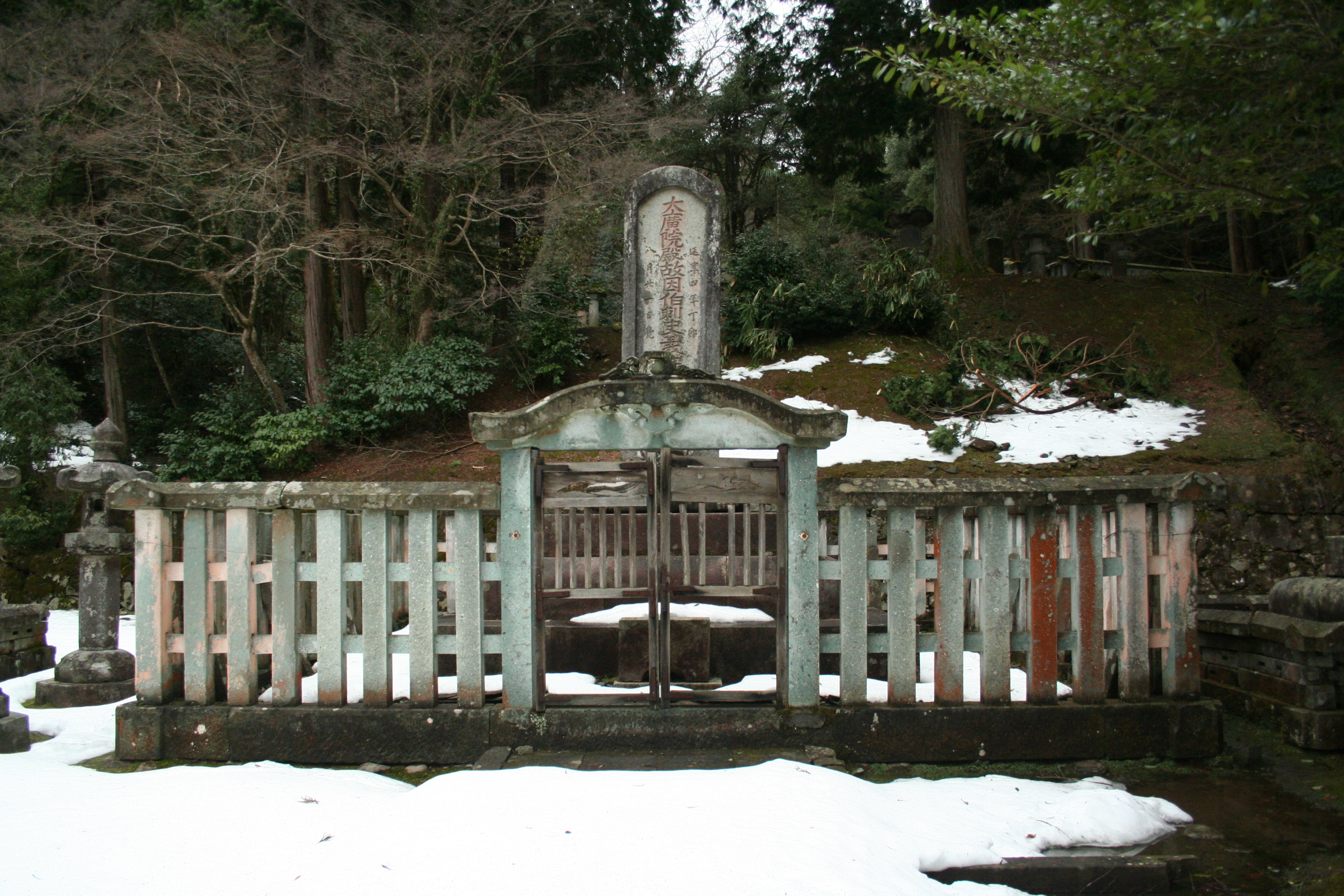
Grave of 4th daimyō, Ikeda Muneyasu

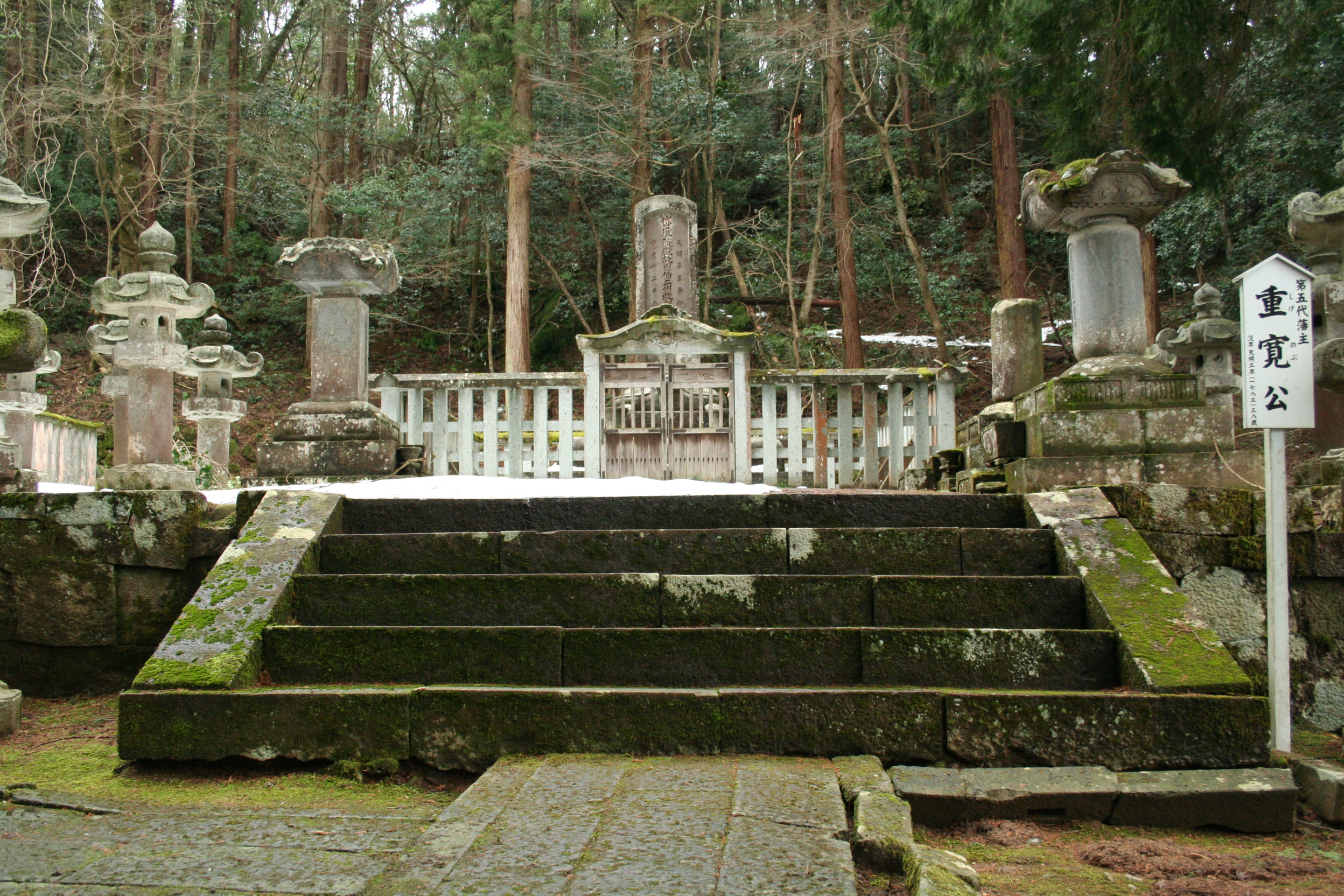
Grave of 5th daimyō, Ikeda Shigenobu

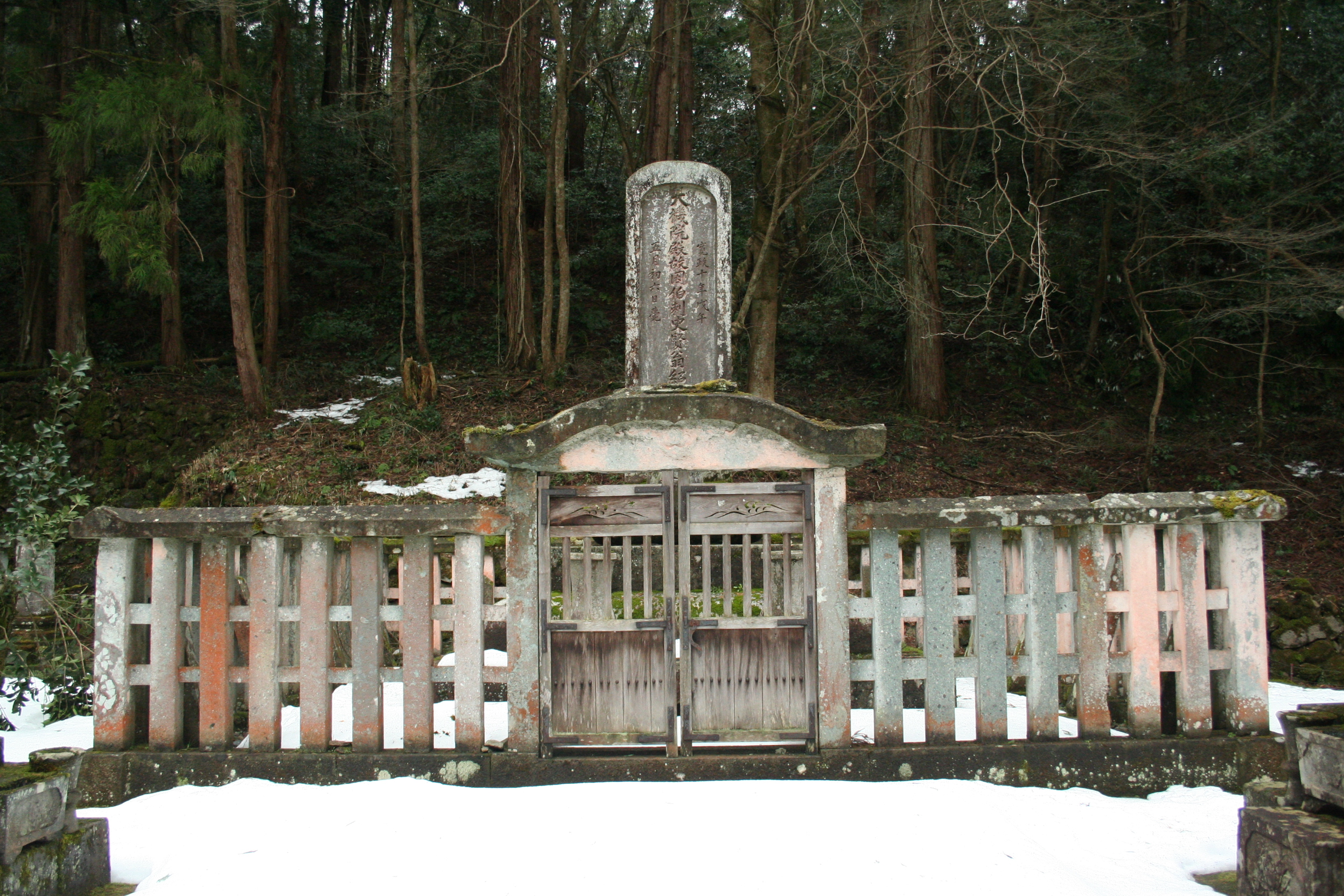
Grave of 6th daimyō, Ikeda Harumichi

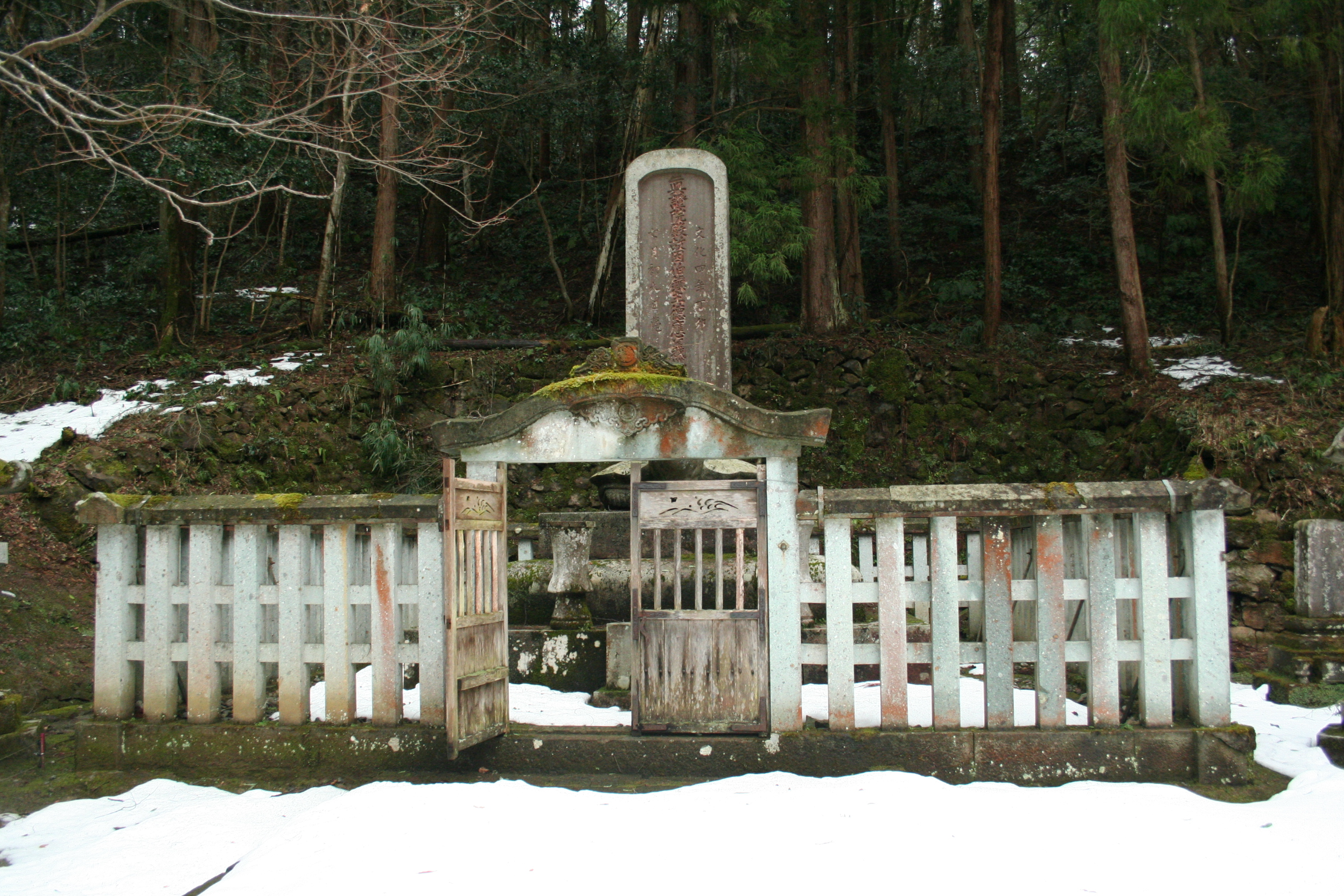
Grave of 7th daimyō, Ikeda Narikuni

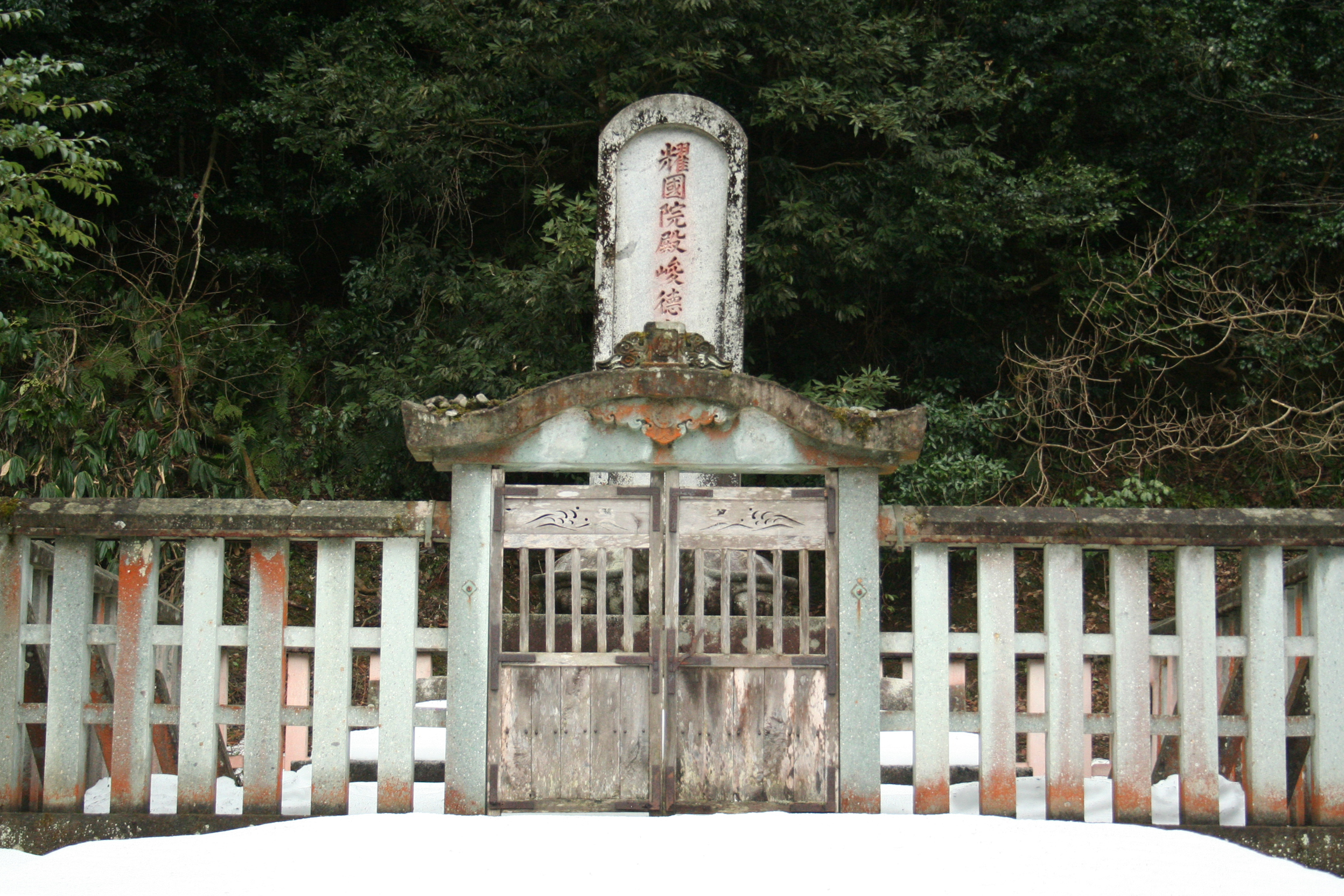
Grave of 8th daimyō, Ikeda Naritoshi

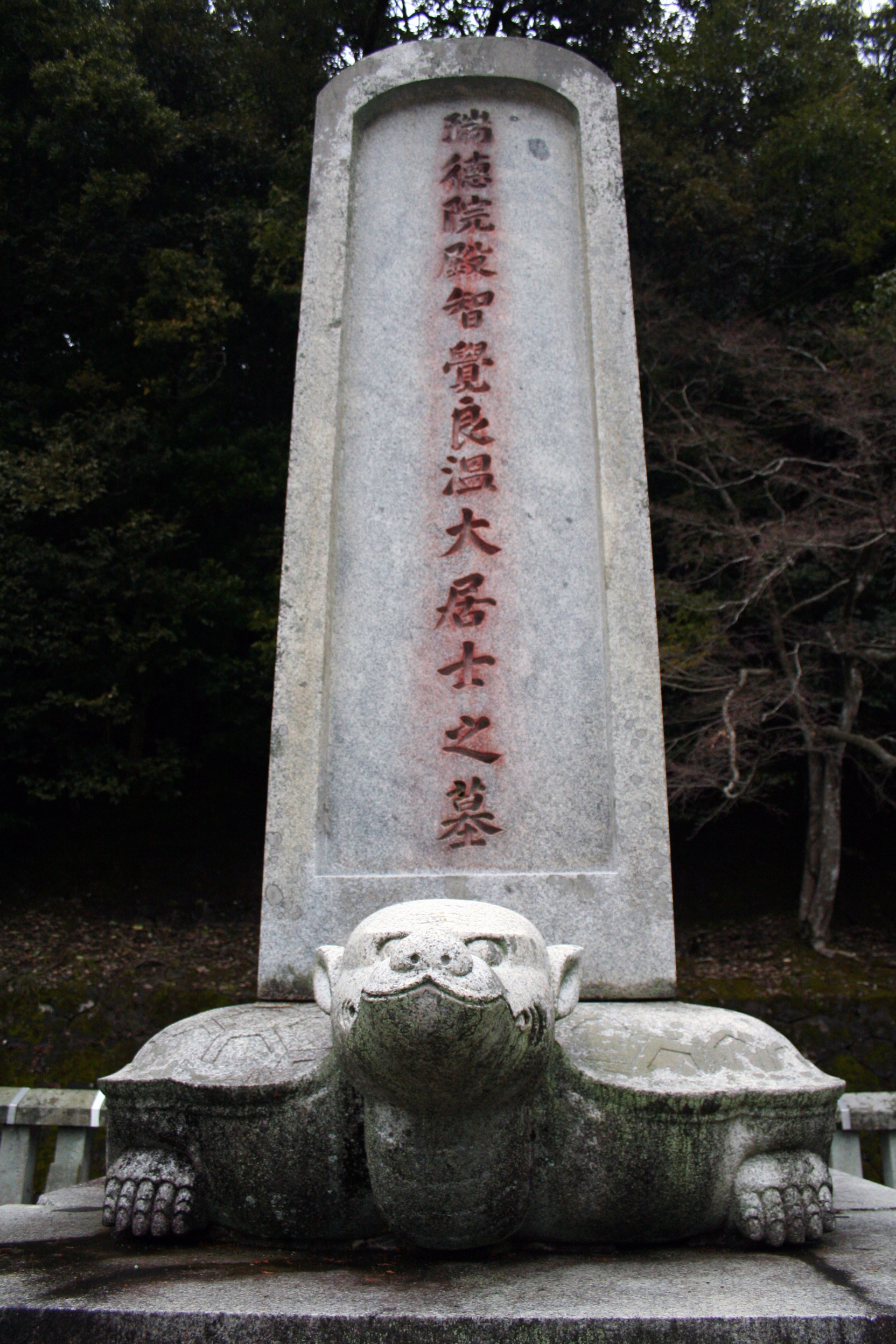
Grave of 9th daimyō, Ikeda Narimichi

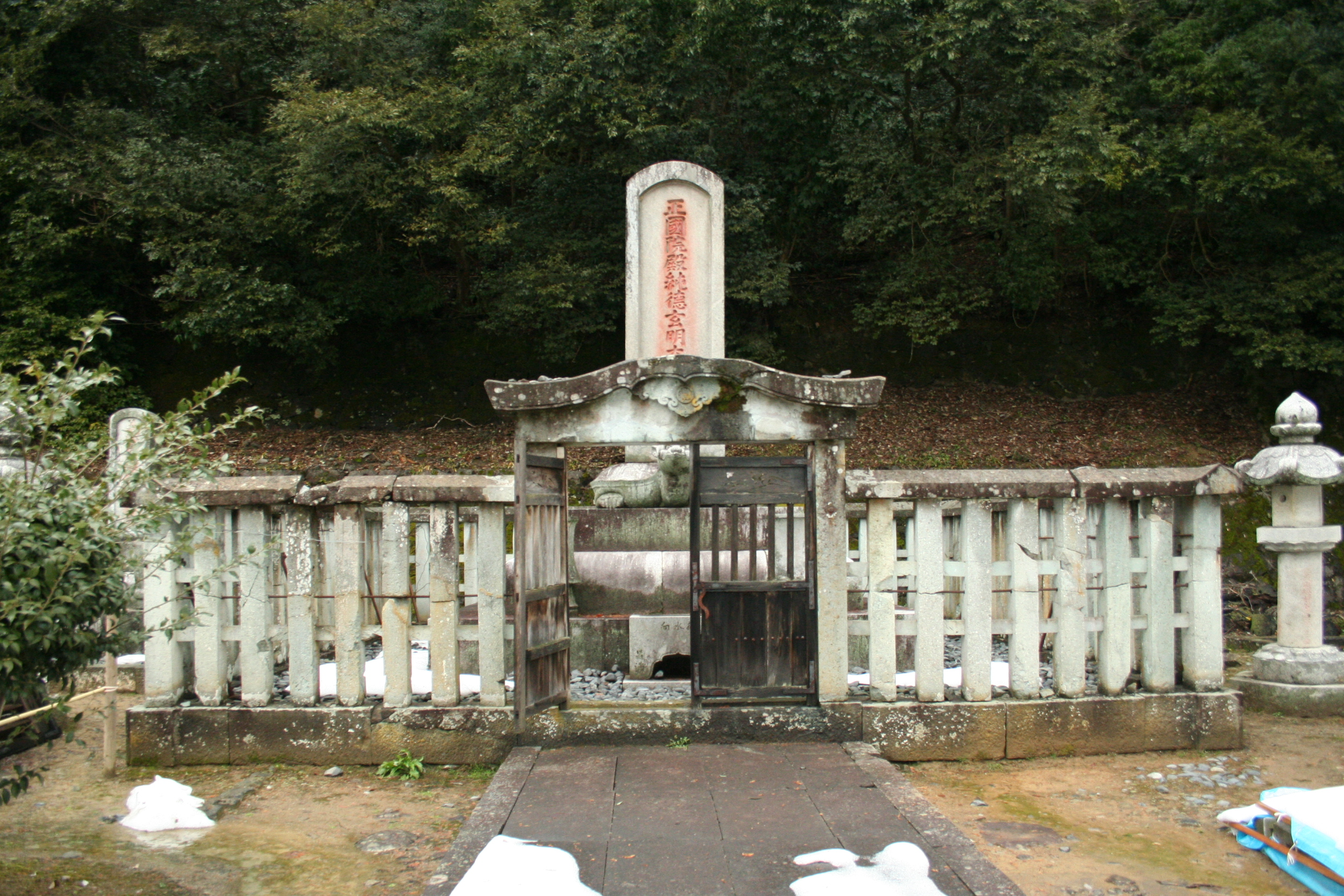
Grave of 10th daimyō, Ikeda Yoshiyuki

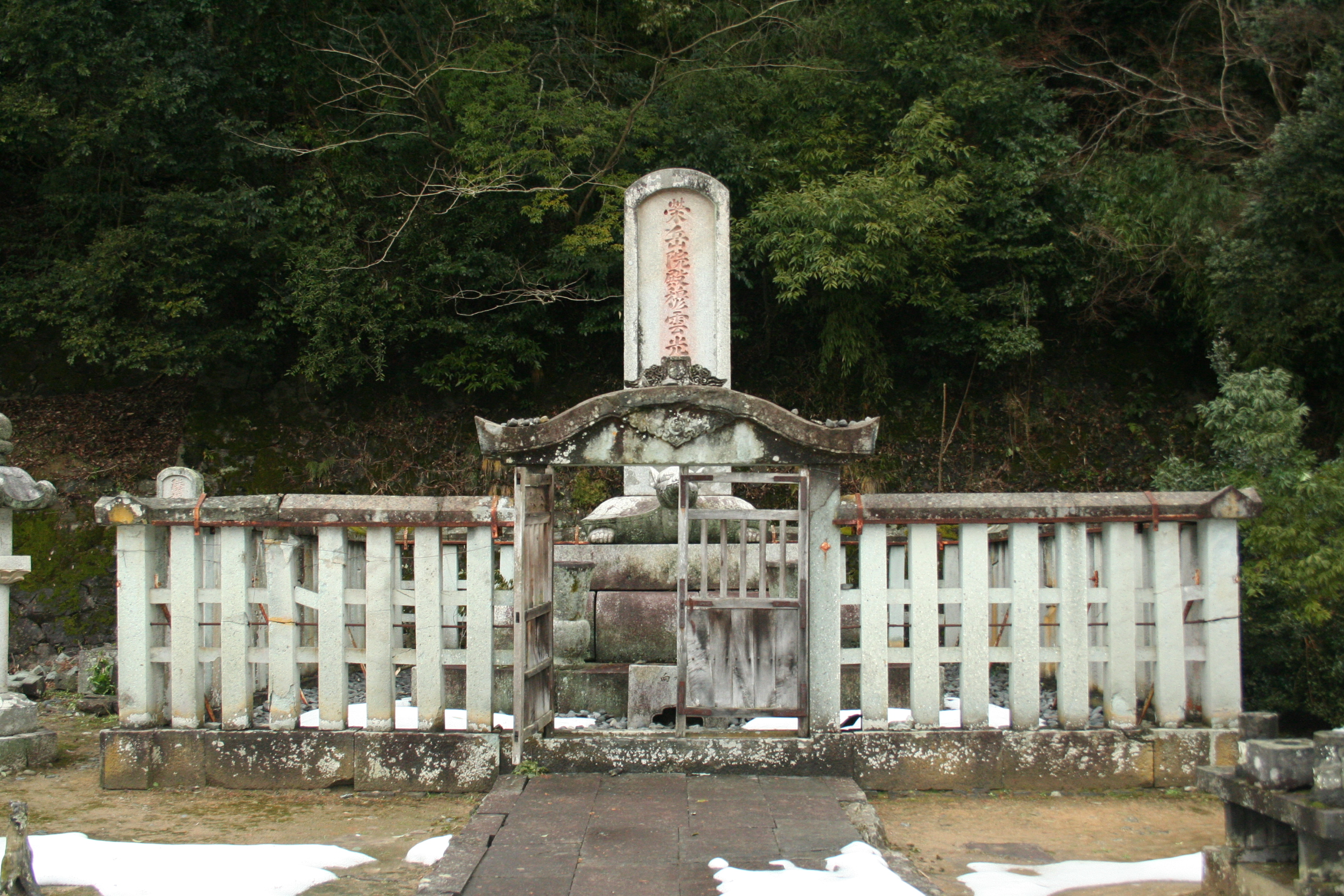
Grave of 11th daimyō, Ikeda Yoshitaka

== See also ==
- List of Historic Sites of Japan (Tottori)
