= Shikano, Tottori =

Dissolved municipality in Tottori prefecture, Japan

Shikano (鹿野町, Shikano-chō) was a town located in Ketaka District, Tottori Prefecture, Japan.

As of 2003, the town had an estimated population of 4,567 and a density of 86.55 persons per km^{2}. The total area was 52.77 km^{2}.

On November 1, 2004, Shikano, along with the town of Kokufu, the village of Fukube (both from Iwami District), the towns of Aoya and Ketaka (all from Ketaka District), the towns of Kawahara and Mochigase, and the village of Saji (all from Yazu District), was merged into the expanded city of Tottori.
