= Aoya, Tottori =

Dissolved municipality in Tottori prefecture, Japan

Aoya (青谷町, Aoya-chō) was a town located in Ketaka District, Tottori Prefecture, Japan.

As of 2003, the town had an estimated population of 7,847 and a density of 115.52 persons per km^{2}. The total area was 67.93 km^{2}.

On November 1, 2004, Aoya, along with the town of Kokufu, the village of Fukube (both from Iwami District), the towns of Ketaka and Shikano (all from Ketaka District), the towns of Kawahara and Mochigase, and the village of Saji (all from Yazu District), was merged into the expanded city of Tottori.
