= Kawahara, Tottori =

Dissolved municipality in Tottori prefecture, Japan

Kawahara (河原町, Kawahara-chō) was a town located in Yazu District, Tottori Prefecture, Japan.

As of 2003, the town had an estimated population of 8,137 and a density of 97.31 persons per km^{2}. The total area was 83.62 km^{2}.

On November 1, 2004, Kawahara, along with the town of Kokufu, the village of Fukube (both from Iwami District), the towns of Aoya, Ketaka and Shikano (all from Ketaka District), the town of Mochigase, and the village of Saji (all from Yazu District), was merged into the expanded city of Tottori.
