= Mount Misumi =

Mount Misumi (三角山 or みすみやま) can refer to:

- Mount Misumi (Tottori), a mountain within Tottori, Tottori Prefecture, Japan
- Mount Misumi (Fukuoka), a mountain in Moji-ku, Kitakyūshū, Fukuoka Prefecture, Japan
