= Fukube, Tottori =

Dissolved municipality in Tottori prefecture, Japan

Fukube (福部村, Fukube-son) was a village located in Iwami District, Tottori Prefecture, Japan.

As of 2003, the village had an estimated population of 3,399 and a density of 97.28 persons per km^{2}. The total area was 34.94 km^{2}.

On November 1, 2004, Fukube, along with the town of Kokufu (from Iwami District), the towns of Aoya, Ketaka and Shikano (all from Ketaka District), the towns of Kawahara and Mochigase, and the village of Saji (all from Yazu District), was merged into the expanded city of Tottori.
