= Saji, Tottori =

Dissolved municipality in Tottori prefecture, Japan

Saji (佐治村, Saji-son) was a village located in Yazu District, Tottori Prefecture, Japan.

As of 2003, the village had an estimated population of 2,689 and a density of 33.66 persons per km^{2}. The total area was 79.89 km^{2}.

On November 1, 2004, Saji, along with the town of Kokufu, the village of Fukube (both from Iwami District), the towns of Aoya, Ketaka and Shikano (all from Ketaka District), and the towns of Kawahara and Mochigase (all from Yazu District), was merged into the expanded city of Tottori.
