= Ketaka, Tottori =

Dissolved municipality in Tottori prefecture, Japan

Ketaka (気高町, Ketaka-chō) was a town located in Ketaka District, Tottori Prefecture, Japan.

As of 2003, the town had an estimated population of 9,869 and a density of 287.64 persons per km^{2}. The total area was 34.31 km^{2}.

On November 1, 2004, Ketaka, along with the town of Kokufu, the village of Fukube (both from Iwami District), the towns of Aoya and Shikano (all from Ketaka District), the towns of Kawahara and Mochigase, and the village of Saji (all from Yazu District), was merged into the expanded city of Tottori.
