= Kōge, Tottori =

Dissolved municipality in Tottori prefecture, Japan

Kōge (郡家町, Kōge-chō) was a town located in Yazu District, Tottori Prefecture, Japan.

As of 2003, the town had an estimated population of 10,163 and a density of 118.82 persons per km^{2}. The total area was 85.53 km^{2}.

On March 31, 2005, Kōge, along with the towns of Funaoka and Hattō (all from Yazu District), was merged to create the town of Yazu.
