= Hattō, Tottori =

Human settlement in Japan

Hattō (八東町, Hattō-chō) was a town located in Yazu District, Tottori Prefecture, Japan.

As of 2003, the town had an estimated population of 5,299 and a density of 78.49 persons per km^{2}. The total area was 67.51 km^{2}.

On March 31, 2005, Hattō, along with the towns of Funaoka and Kōge (all from Yazu District), was merged to create the town of Yazu.

Hattō was known for its lively fish markets.
