= Okuhino Prefectural Natural Park =

Coordinates: 35°12′16″N 133°18′49.8″E

- 奥日野県立自然公園
- Interactive map of Okuhino Prefectural Natural Park
- Location: Tottori Prefecture, Japan
- Area: 48.23 km^{2} (18.62 sq mi)
- Established: December 1994

Okuhino Prefectural Natural Park (奥日野県立自然公園, Okuhino kenritsu shizen kōen) is a Prefectural Natural Park in southwest Tottori Prefecture, Japan. Established in 1994, the park spans the municipalities of Hino and Nichinan.

== See also ==
- National Parks of Japan
