= Misasa-Tōgōko Prefectural Natural Park =

Natural park of Tottori prefecture, Japan

Coordinates: 35°27′54.5″N 133°53′30″E

- 三朝東郷湖県立自然公園
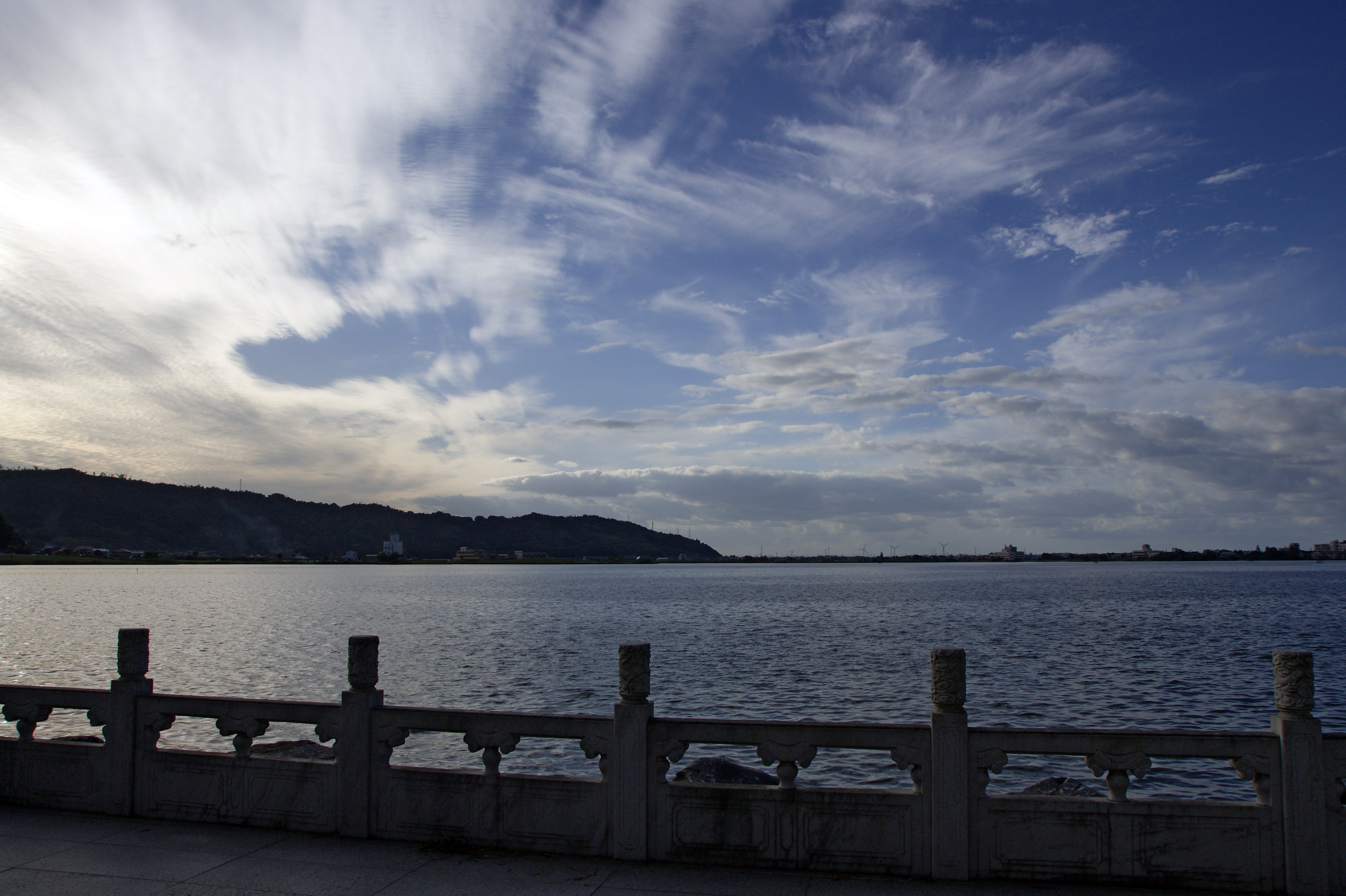
- Lake Tōgō
- Interactive map of Misasa-Tōgōko Prefectural Natural Park
- Location: Tottori Prefecture, Japan
- Area: 150.67 km^{2} (58.17 sq mi)
- Established: December 1994

Misasa-Tōgōko Prefectural Natural Park (三朝東郷湖県立自然公園, Misasa-Tōgōko kenritsu shizen kōen) is a Prefectural Natural Park in Tottori Prefecture, Japan. Established in 1994, the park spans the municipalities of Kurayoshi, Misasa, and Yurihama.

== See also ==
- National Parks of Japan
