= Mochigase, Tottori =

Dissolved municipality in Tottori prefecture, Japan

Mochigase (用瀬町, Mochigase-chō) was a town located in Yazu District, Tottori Prefecture, Japan.

As of 2003, the town had an estimated population of 4,143 and a density of 50.77 persons per km^{2}. The total area was 81.60 km^{2}.

On November 1, 2004, Mochigase, along with the town of Kokufu, the village of Fukube (both from Iwami District), the towns of Aoya, Ketaka and Shikano (all from Ketaka District), the town of Kawahara, and the village of Saji (all from Yazu District), was merged into the expanded city of Tottori.

Mount Misumi is located within the former boundaries of Mochigase.
