= Bingo dialect =

Japanese dialect of the Bingo Region

- 備後弁
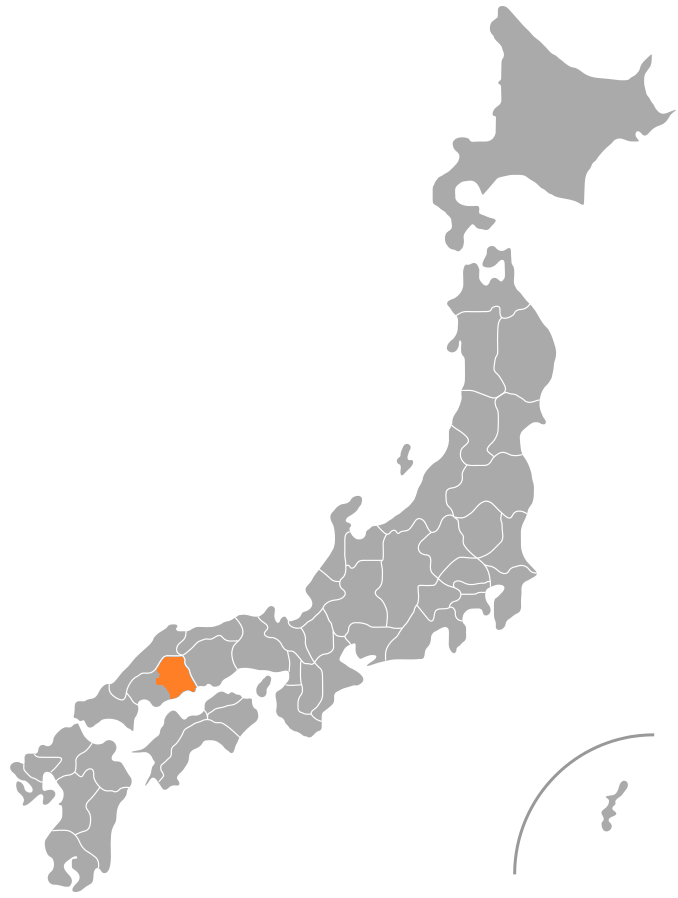
- Bingo dialect area.
- Native to: Japan
- Region: Hiroshima Prefecture
- Language family: Japanese: Western; Chūgoku; San'yō; Bingo dialect

Language codes
- ISO 639-3: –

The Bingo dialect (Japanese: 備後弁 bingo-ben) is a Japanese dialect spoken in the Bingo Region (formerly Bingo Province) of eastern Hiroshima Prefecture. It is part of the Chūgoku dialect group.

== Classification ==
The dialects of Hiroshima Prefecture are broadly divided into that of the former Asano region, which included the former Aki Province and northern Bingo, and the dialect of the former Fukuyama region, which controlled south-eastern Bingo. The former is commonly treated as the Hiroshima (or Aki) dialect, whilst the Bingo dialect is considered the latter. More so than to the Hiroshima dialect, the Bingo dialect is similar to the neighbouring Okayama dialect, and is sometimes included along with it in a wider San'yō dialect. Due to being under the historical influence of Fukuyama, the vernacular of some cities that are located within Okayama Prefecture in the present day, such as Kasaoka and Ibara, is similar to that of the Bingo dialect.

== Phonology ==
The Bingo dialect has a Tokyo standard (specifically otsushu (乙種 ‘second grade’) pitch accent. A large section of Hiroshima Prefecture that includes the northern part of Bingo has a so-called chuurin (中輪 ‘middle-ring’) Tokyo standard pitch accent. In the former Fukuyama area, however, second-class single-mora nouns like hi (日 day) become pronounced with a rising pitch (hi ga (ひが)), giving it a so-called nairin (内輪 ‘inner ring’) Tokyo standard pitch accent, much like the majority of Okayama Prefecture. In Fukuyama and Onomichi, the first section of a word has a rising pitch, such as in yama ga (やまが mountain retreat).

Diphthongs are frequently merged, with ai (あい) becoming a lengthened intermediate sound between a and e (aē (あえぇ)) (or ā (あぁ) in northern Bingo). In Fukuyama City, however, other than when starting a word, ai becomes yā (ャー), such as in akai (赤い red) → akyā (あきゃあ). This differs from the Aki dialect or Yamaguchi dialect (where ai becomes ā) and is a trait that extends to the Okayama dialect. Outside of Fukuyama however this merging is only found in the older generation. Other changes to diphthongs include oi (おい) becoming ē (えぇ) and ui (うい) becoming ii (いい).

Like other parts of Western Japan, the vowel sound u (う) is pronounced with the lips rounded and brought together horizontally.
