= Chūgoku dialects =

Group of Japanese dialects spoken in Chūgoku, Japan

Chūgoku Japanese
- Native to: Japan
- Region: Chūgoku
- Language family: Japonic: Japanese; Western Japanese; Chūgoku Japanese

Language codes
- ISO 639-3: –
- Glottolog: chug1253
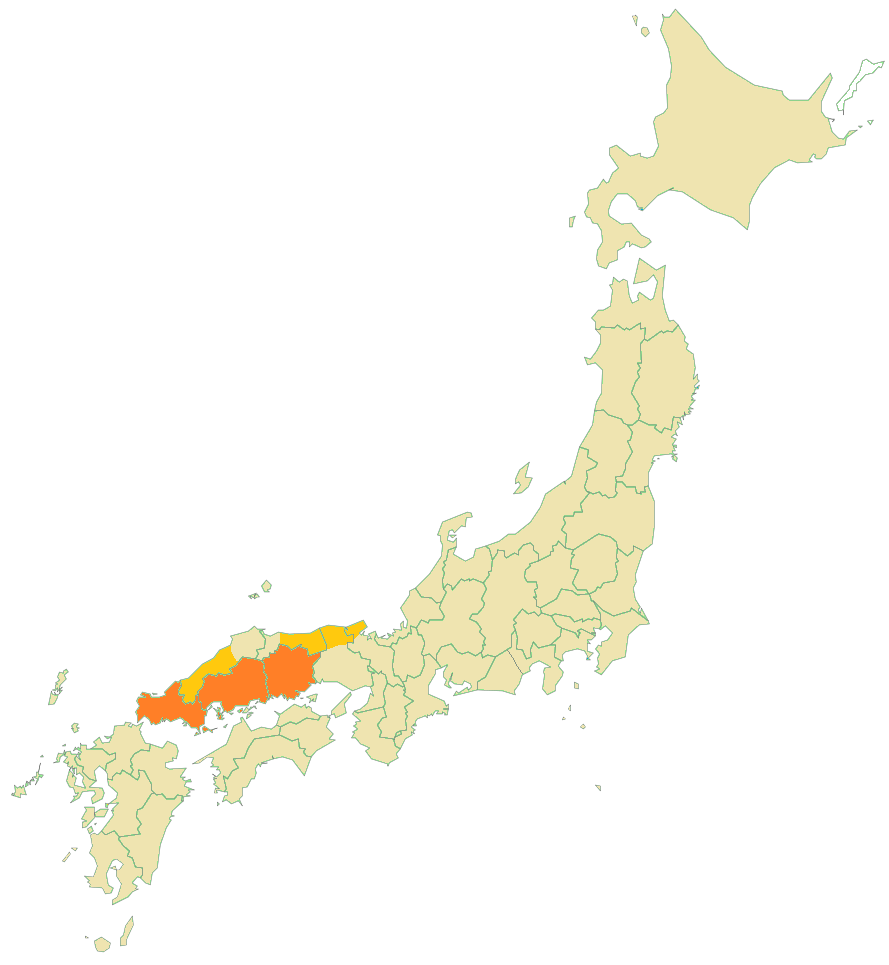
- Chūgoku dialect area. Yellow: da dialects. Orange: ja dialects.

The Chūgoku dialect (中国方言, Chūgoku hōgen) is a group of the Japanese dialects spoken in most of the Chūgoku region and in the northwestern Kansai region. It may be separated into two groups according to the form of the copula.

- copula ja group (San'yō region)
  - Aki also known as Hiroshima dialect (western Hiroshima Prefecture, formerly known as Aki Province)
  - Bingo dialect (eastern Hiroshima Prefecture, formerly known as Bingo Province)
    - Fukuyama dialect (Fukuyama)
  - Okayama dialect (Okayama Prefecture)
  - Yamaguchi also known as Chōshū dialect (Yamaguchi Prefecture)
- copula da group (parts of San'in region)
  - Iwami dialect (western Shimane Prefecture, formerly known as Iwami Province)
    - ja is also used in western Iwami region.
  - Inshū, also known as Tottori dialect (eastern Tottori Prefecture, formerly known as Inaba Province)
  - Tajima dialect (northern Hyōgo Prefecture, formerly known as Tajima Province)
  - Tango dialect (northernmost of Kyoto Prefecture, formerly known as Tango Province except Maizuru)

Although Kansai dialect uses copula ya, Chūgoku dialect mainly uses ja or da. Chūgoku dialect uses ken or kee instead of kara meaning "because". ken is also used in Umpaku dialect, Shikoku dialect, Hōnichi dialect and Hichiku dialect. In addition, Chūgoku dialect uses -yoru in progressive aspect and -toru or -choru in perfect. For example, Tarō wa benkyō shiyoru (太郎は勉強しよる) means "Taro is studying", and Tarō wa benkyō shitoru (太郎は勉強しとる) means "Taro has studied" while standard Japanese speakers say Tarō wa benkyō shiteiru (太郎は勉強している) in both situations. -Choru is used mostly in Yamaguchi dialect.

Pitch accent of Chūgoku dialect is similar to the Tokyo accent and is a contrast to Kansai dialect and Shikoku dialect.
