= Kokufu, Tottori =

Dissolved municipality in Tottori prefecture, Japan

Kokufu (国府町, Kokufu-chō) was a town located in Iwami District, Tottori Prefecture, Japan.

As of 2003, the town had an estimated population of 8,629 and a density of 92.39 persons per km^{2}. The total area was 93.40 km^{2}.

On November 1, 2004, Kokufu, along with the village of Fukube (also from Iwami District), the towns of Aoya, Ketaka and Shikano (all from Ketaka District), the towns of Kawahara and Mochigase, and the village of Saji (all from Yazu District), was merged into the expanded city of Tottori.
