= Funaoka, Tottori =

Dissolved municipality in Tottori prefecture, Japan

Funaoka (船岡町, Funaoka-chō) was a town located in Yazu District, Tottori Prefecture, Japan.

As of 2003, the town had an estimated population of 4,413 and a density of 82.22 persons per km^{2}. The total area was 53.67 km^{2}.

On March 31, 2005, Funaoka, along with the towns of Hattō and Kōge (all from Yazu District), was merged to create the town of Yazu.
