= Mount Misumi (Tottori) =

Mountain in Tottori, Japan

- Mount Tokin, Mount Tokkin
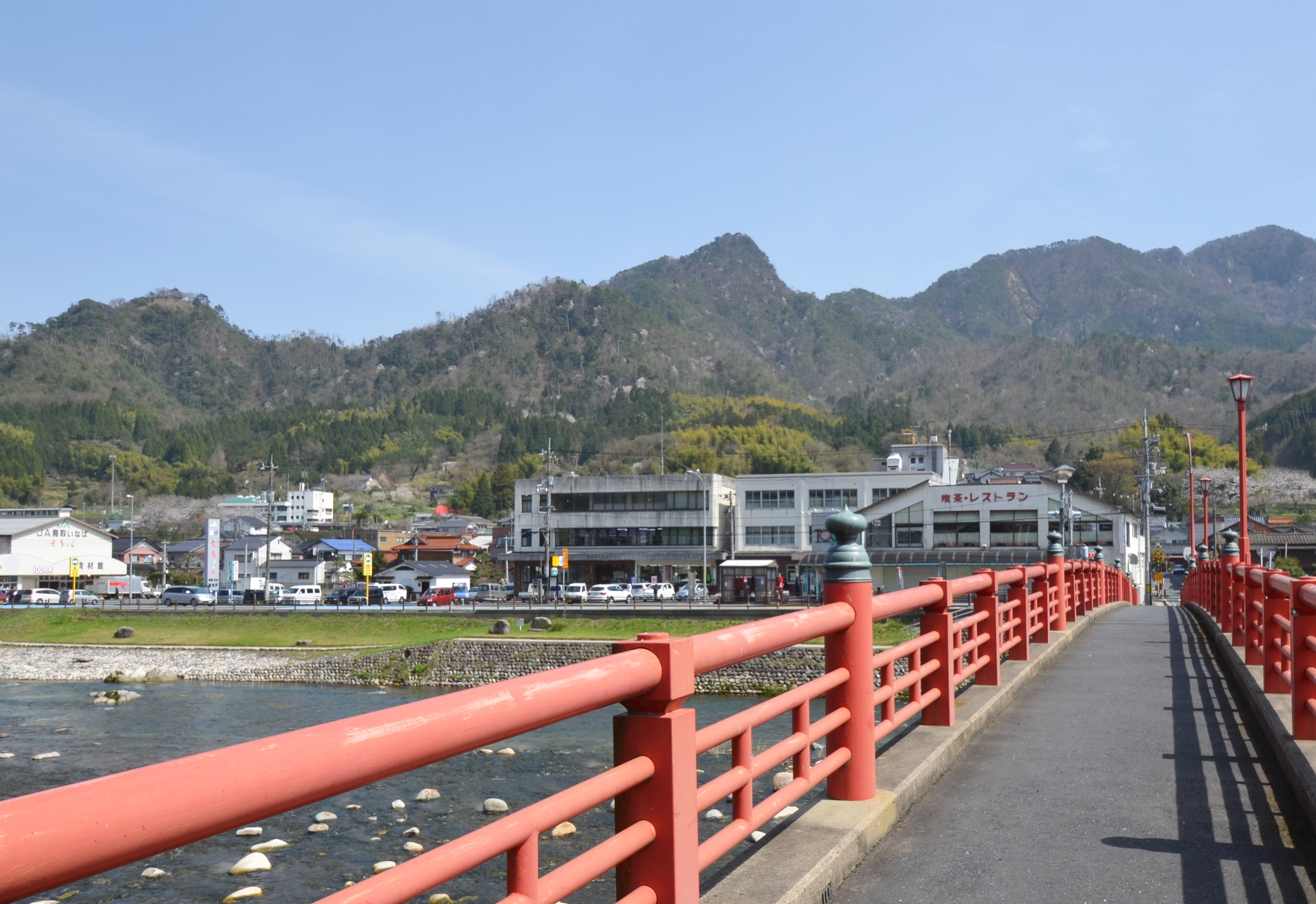
- View of Mount Misumi from a bridge over the Sendai River.

Highest point
- Elevation: 516 m (1,693 ft)
- Coordinates: 35°20′17.2″N 134°13′8.5″E

Naming
- Native name: 三角山 (Japanese); 頭巾山 (Japanese); 襟巾山 (Japanese)

Geography
- Location within Tottori Prefecture Location within Japan
- Country: Japan
- Prefecture: Tottori
- Parent range: Chūgoku Mountains

Mount Misumi (三角山, Misumi-yama), also known as Mount Tokin (頭巾山, Tokin-yama) or Mount Tokkin (襟巾山, Tokkin-zan), is a mountain in Tottori (formerly Mochigase), Tottori Prefecture, Japan. It is one of the 100 Famous Mountains of Chūgoku and stands 516 metres (1,693 ft) tall.

Mt. Misumi is a granite mountain with a sharply pointed triangular summit. It was a holy mountain in the Shugendō faith, and was believed in legend to be the residence of the kami Sarutahiko.

Misumi Shrine is found at the base of the mountain. The main hall of the shrine is a designated cultural asset of the city of Tottori.
