= Yazu District, Tottori =

District in Tottori prefecture, Japan

Coordinates: 35.311°N 134.363°E

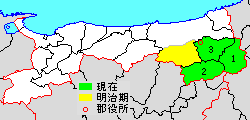
Location of Yazu District in Tottori Prefecture

Yazu (八頭郡, Yazu-gun) is a district located in Tottori Prefecture, Japan.

As of 2003, the district has an estimated population of 48,540 and a density of 55.43 persons per km^{2}. The total area is 875.74 km^{2}.

== Towns and villages ==
- Chizu
- Wakasa
- Yazu

== Mergers ==
- On November 1, 2004, the towns of Kawahara and Mochigase, and the village of Saji merged into the city of Tottori.
- On March 31, 2005, the towns of Kōge, Funaoka and Hattō merged to form the new town of Yazu.
