= Iwami District, Tottori =

District in Tottori prefecture, Japan

Coordinates: 35.534°N 134.381°E

Location of Iwami District in Tottori Prefecture

Iwami (岩美郡, Iwami-gun) is a district located in Tottori Prefecture, Japan.

As of 2003, the district has an estimated population of 25,607 and a density of 102.13 persons per km^{2}. The total area is 250.72 km^{2}.

== Towns and villages ==
- Iwami

== Merger ==
- On November 1, 2004 the town of Kokufu, and the village of Fukube merged into the city of Tottori.
