= Tottori Prefecture =

Prefecture of Japan

Tottori Prefecture 鳥取県
- Prefecture

Japanese transcription(s)
  - Japanese: 鳥取県
  - Rōmaji: Tottori-ken
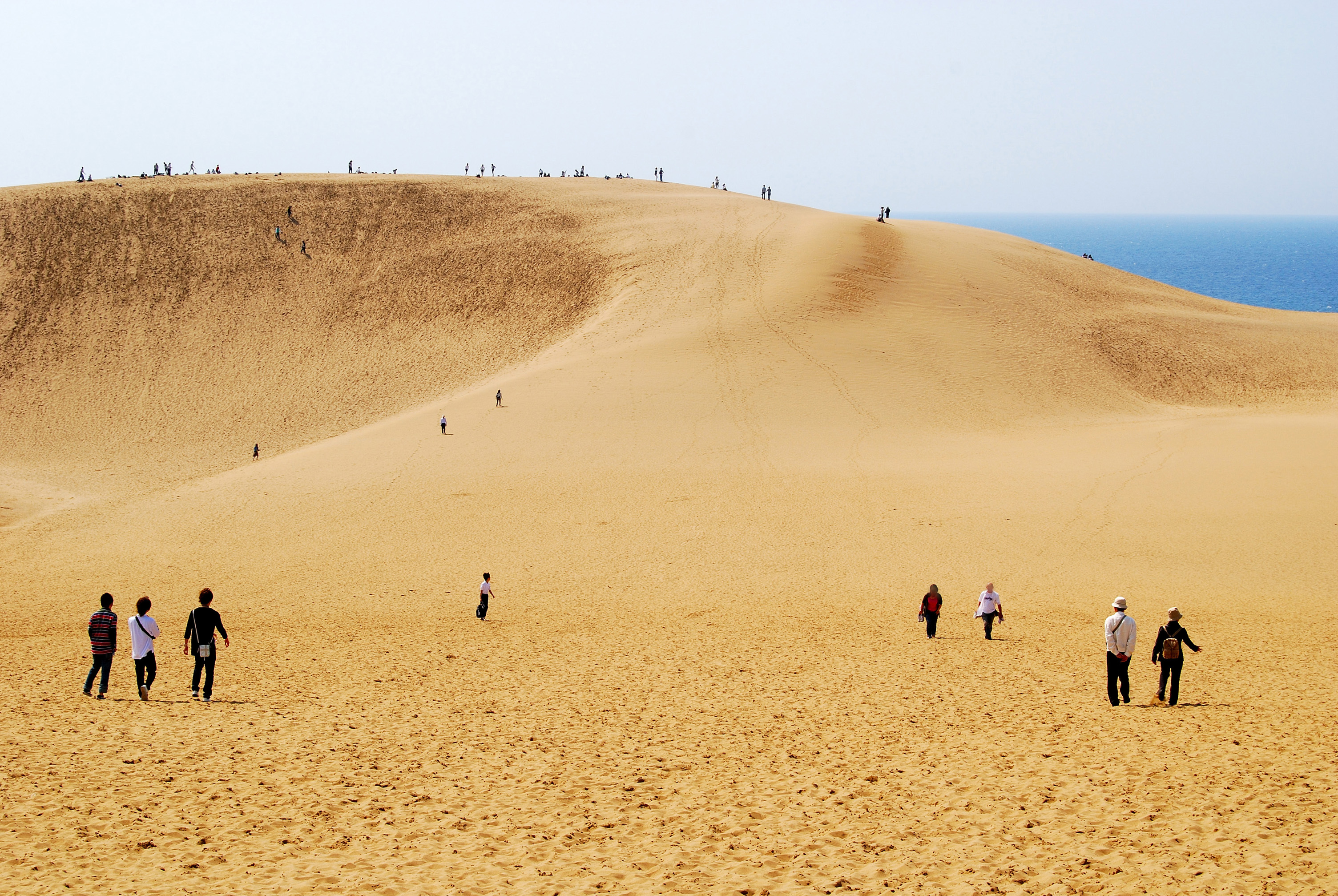
- Tottori Sand Dunes near Tottori City, a popular tourist attraction in Tottori Prefecture

- Flag Symbol
- Anthem: Wakiagaru chikara
- Coordinates: 35.449°N 133.766°E
- Country: Japan
- Region: Chūgoku (San'in)
- Island: Honshu
- Capital: Tottori
- Subdivisions: Districts: 5, Municipalities: 19

Government
  - Governor: Shinji Hirai

Area
  - Total: 3,507.13 km^{2} (1,354.11 sq mi)
  - Rank: 41st

Population (July 1, 2023)
  - Total: 538,525
  - Rank: 47th
  - Density: 154/km^{2} (400/sq mi)
  - Dialects: Inshū・Kurayoshi・West Hōki

GDP
  - Total: JP¥ 1,912 billion US$ 14.1 billion (2022)
- ISO 3166 code: JP-31
- Website: www.pref.tottori.lg.jp
- Symbols of Japan
- Bird: Mandarin duck (Aix galericulata)
- Flower: Nijisseiki nashi pear blossom (Pyrus pyrifolia)
- Tree: Daisenkyaraboku (Taxus cuspidata)

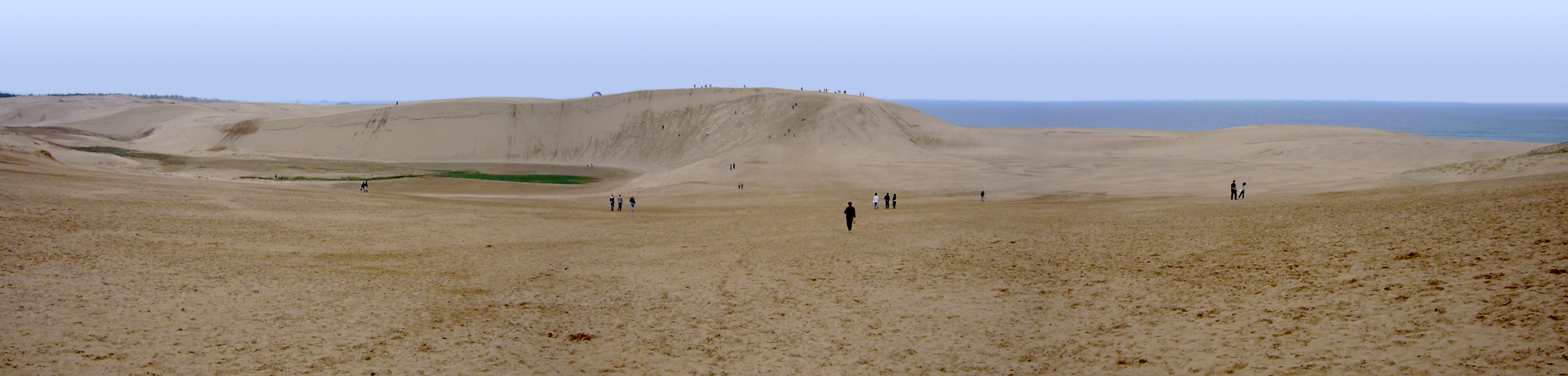
The Tottori Sand Dunes

Tottori Prefecture (鳥取県, Tottori-ken; Japanese pronunciation: [tò̞t̚.tó̞.ɾʲí(.kè̞ɴ̀)]) is a prefecture of Japan located in the Chūgoku region of Honshu. Tottori Prefecture is the least populous prefecture of Japan at 516,273 (2026) and has a geographic area of 3,507.13 square kilometres (1,354.11 mi^{2}). Tottori Prefecture borders Shimane Prefecture to the west, Hiroshima Prefecture to the southwest, Okayama Prefecture to the south, and Hyōgo Prefecture to the east.

Tottori is the capital and largest city of Tottori Prefecture, with other major cities including Yonago, Kurayoshi, and Sakaiminato. Tottori Prefecture is home to the Tottori Sand Dunes, the largest sand dunes system in Japan, and Mount Daisen, the highest peak in the Chūgoku Mountains. Tottori prefecture has the lowest amount of population, yet it is the biggest coffee consumer per household in Japan.

== Etymology ==
The word "Tottori" in Japanese is formed from two kanji characters. The first, 鳥, means "bird" and the second, 取 means "to get". Early residents in the area made their living catching the region's plentiful waterfowl. The name first appears in the Nihon shoki in the 23rd year of the Emperor Suinin (213 AD) when Yukuha Tana, an elder from the Izumo, visits the emperor. The imperial Prince Homatsu-wake was unable to speak, despite being 30 years of age.

"Yukuha Tana presented the swan to the emperor. Homatsu-wake no Mikoto played with this swan and at last learned to speak. Therefore, Yukaha Tana was liberally rewarded, and was granted the title of Tottori no Miyakko." (Aston, translation)

== History ==
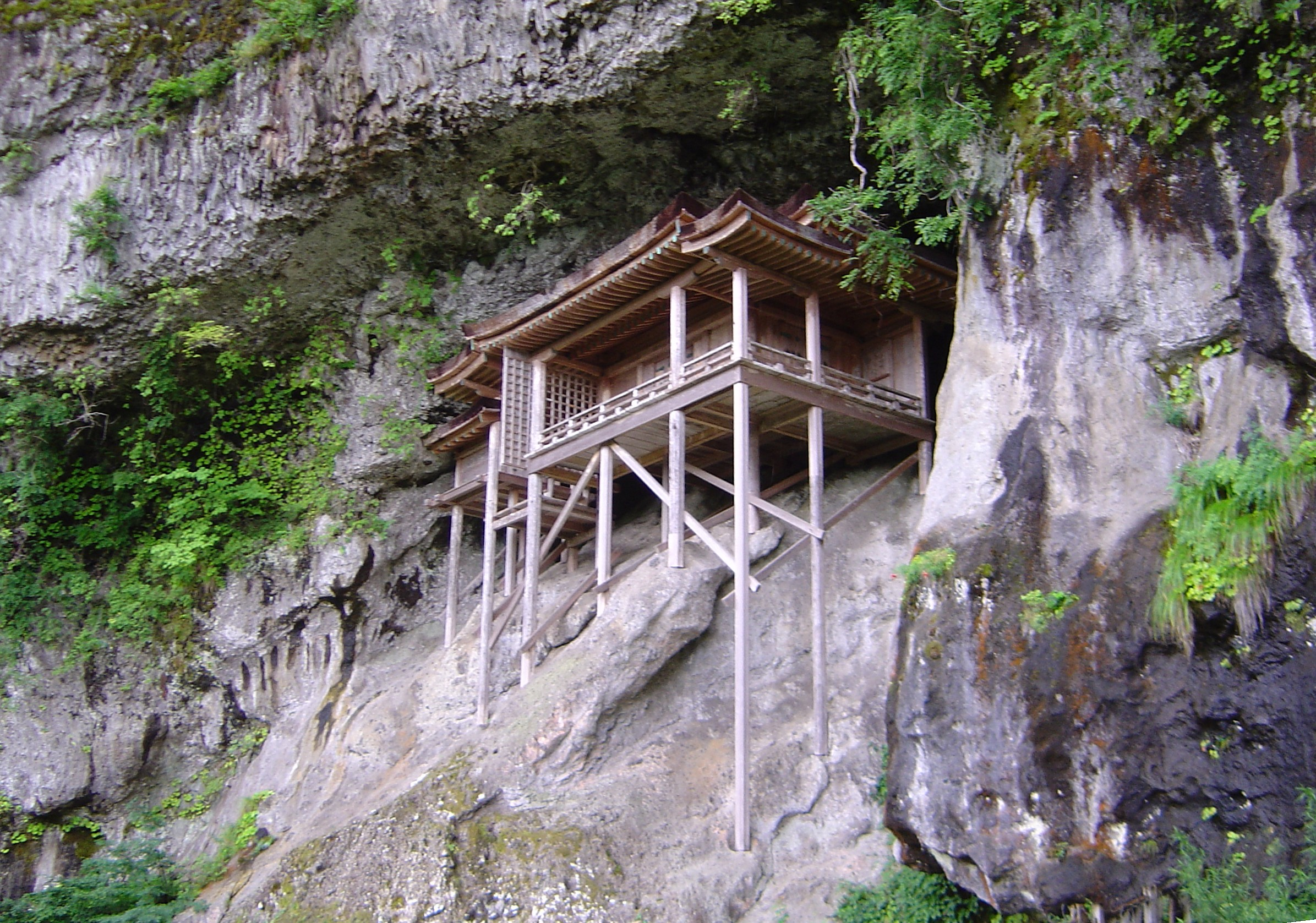
Sanbutsu-ji

=== Early history ===
Tottori Prefecture was settled very early in the prehistoric period of Japan, as evidenced by remains from the Jōmon period (14,000 – 300 BC). The prefecture has the remains of the largest known Yayoi period (300 BC – 250 AD) settlement in Japan, the Mukibanda Yayoi remains, located in the low foothills of Mount Daisen in the cities of Daisen and Yonago. Numerous kofun tumuli from the Kofun period (250 – 538) are located across the prefecture. In 645, under the Taika reforms, the area in present-day Tottori Prefecture became two provinces, Hōki and Inaba.

=== Later history ===
During the Genpei War (1180–1185) between the Taira and Minamoto clans in the late-Heian period, Tottori became a base for anti-Taira forces, specifically at two temples, Daisen-ji and Sanbutsu-ji. By the beginning of the Kamakura period (1185–1333) shōen estates were established to directly support the Imperial court and various temples. Successive clans controlled the region during the Sengoku period (15th to 17th century), most notably the Yamana clan, but after the Battle of Sekigahara in 1600 the region was pacified. The Tokugawa shogunate installed the Ikeda clan at Tottori Castle. The clan retained control of the area until throughout the Edo period (1603–1868) and the resources of the area financially and materially supported the shogunate.

=== Modern history ===
The two provinces remained in place until the Meiji Restoration in 1868, and the boundaries of Tottori Prefecture were established in 1888. After the occupation of Korea and Taiwan in the 20th century, and the establishment of the Manchukuo puppet state in 1932, Tottori's harbors on the Japan Sea served as an active transit point for goods between Japan and the colonial areas. Before the end of World War II the prefecture was hit by a massive magnitude 7.2 earthquake, the 1943 Tottori earthquake, which destroyed 80% of the city of Tottori, and greatly damaged the surrounding area. In the postwar period land reform was carried out in the prefecture, resulting in a great increase of agricultural production.

== Geography ==
Map of Tottori Prefecture City Town Village

Cities in Tottori Prefecture
1 Kurayoshi
2 Sakaiminato
3 Tottori(capital)
4 Yonago

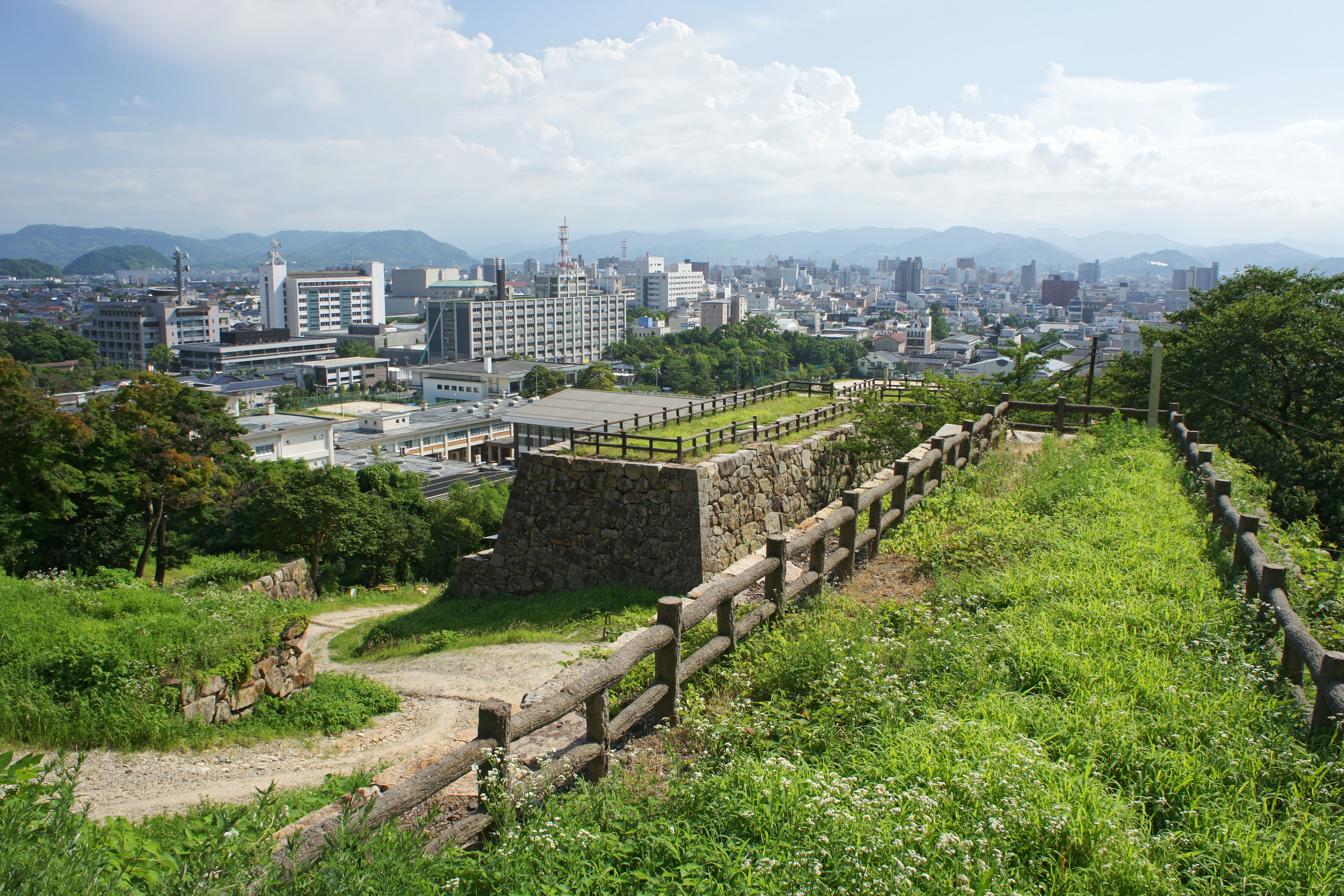
Tottori City

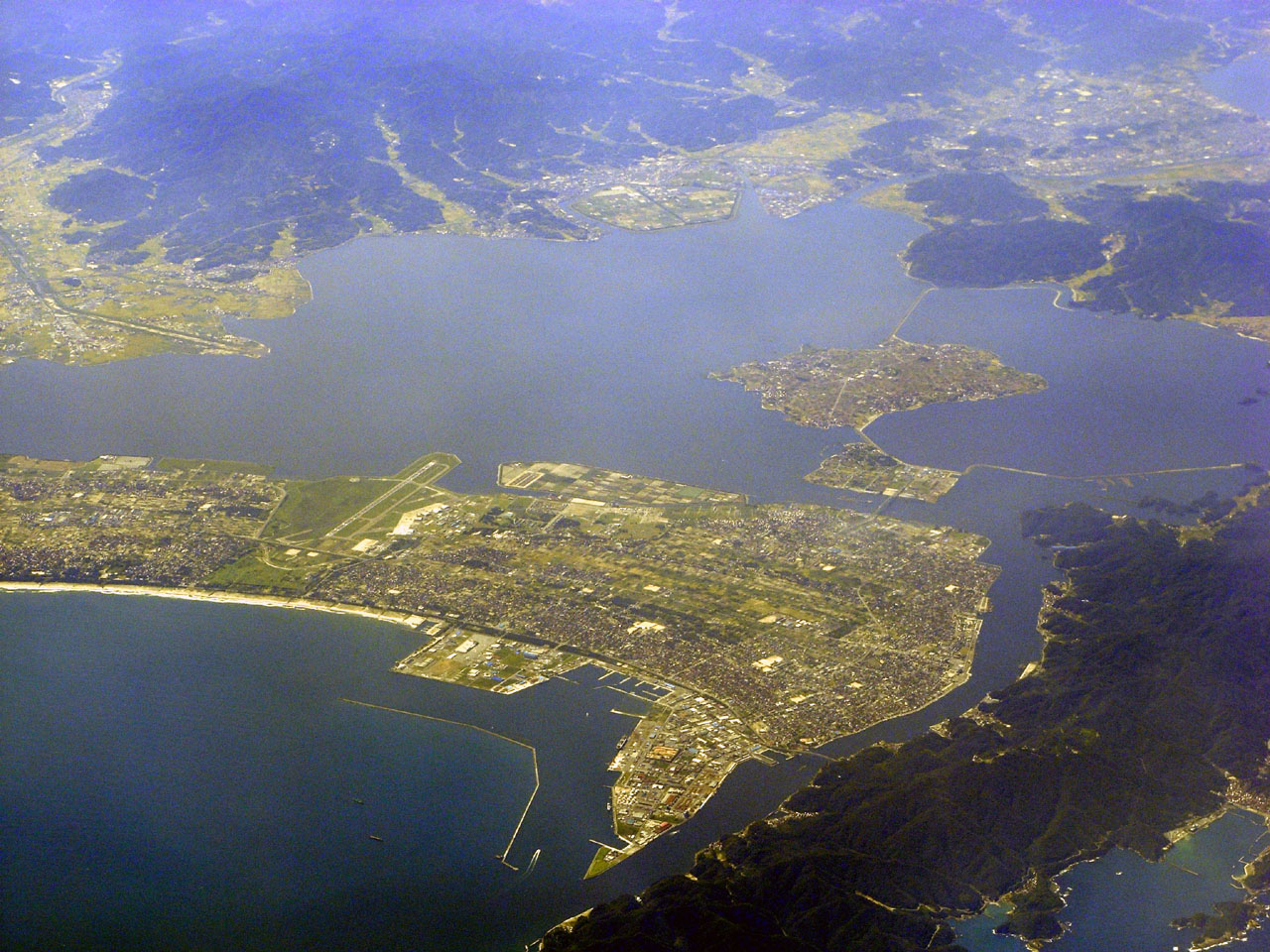
Sakaiminato

Tottori is home to the Tottori Sand Dunes, Japan's only large dune system. As of 1 April 2012, 14% of the total land area of the prefecture was designated as Natural Parks, namely the Daisen-Oki and Sanin Kaigan National Parks; Hiba-Dōgo-Taishaku and Hyōnosen-Ushiroyama-Nagisan Quasi-National Parks; and Misasa-Tōgōko, Nishi Inaba, and Okuhino Prefectural Natural Parks.

Mount Misumi is located within the former area of Mochigase that was merged into the city of Tottori in 2004.

=== Cities ===
Four cities are located in Tottori Prefecture:

Name		Area (km^{2})	Population	Map
Rōmaji	Kanji	Area (km^{2})	Population	Map
Kurayoshi	倉吉市	272.06	48,558	
Sakaiminato	境港市	29.02	33,888	
Tottori (capital)	鳥取市	765.31	192,912	
Yonago	米子市	132.42	148,720	

=== Towns and villages ===
These are the towns and villages in each district:

Name		Area (km^{2})	Population	District	Type	Map
Rōmaji	Kanji	Area (km^{2})	Population	District	Type	Map
Chizu	智頭町	224.61	7,031	Yazu District	Town	
Daisen	大山町	189.83	16,357	Saihaku District	Town	
Hiezu	日吉津村	4.2	3,439	Saihaku District	Village	
Hino	日野町	133.98	2,649	Hino District	Town	
Hōki	伯耆町	139.44	11,071	Saihaku District	Town	
Hokuei	北栄町	56.94	14,718	Tōhaku District	Town	
Iwami	岩美町	122.32	11,382	Iwami District	Town	
Kōfu	江府町	124.52	2,950	Hino District	Town	
Kotoura	琴浦町	139.97	17,219	Tōhaku District	Town	
Misasa	三朝町	233.52	6,407	Tōhaku District	Town	
Nanbu	南部町	114.03	10,888	Saihaku District	Town	
Nichinan	日南町	340.96	4,665	Hino District	Town	
Wakasa	若桜町	199.31	3,209	Yazu District	Town	
Yazu	八頭町	206.71	16,985	Yazu District	Town	
Yurihama	湯梨浜町	77.94	16,837	Tōhaku District	Town	

== Demographics ==
Tottori prefecture population pyramid in 2020

Per Japanese census data, Tottori is the least populated prefecture in Japan.

Historical population
Year	Pop.	±%
1920	455,000	—
1930	489,000	+7.5%
1940	484,000	−1.0%
1950	600,000	+24.0%
1960	599,000	−0.2%
1970	569,000	−5.0%
1980	604,000	+6.2%
1990	616,000	+2.0%
2000	613,289	−0.4%
2010	588,667	−4.0%
2020	560,517	−4.8%

== Economy ==
Tottori Prefecture is heavily agricultural and its products are shipped to the major cities of Japan. Some of the famous products are the nashi pear, nagaimo yam, Japanese scallion, negi, and watermelon. The prefecture is also a major producer of rice.

== Language ==
Historically, the region had extensive linguistic diversity. While the standard Tokyo dialect of the Japanese language is now used in Tottori Prefecture, several other dialects are also used. Many of them are grouped with Western Japanese, and include the Chugoku and Umpaku dialects.

== Sports ==
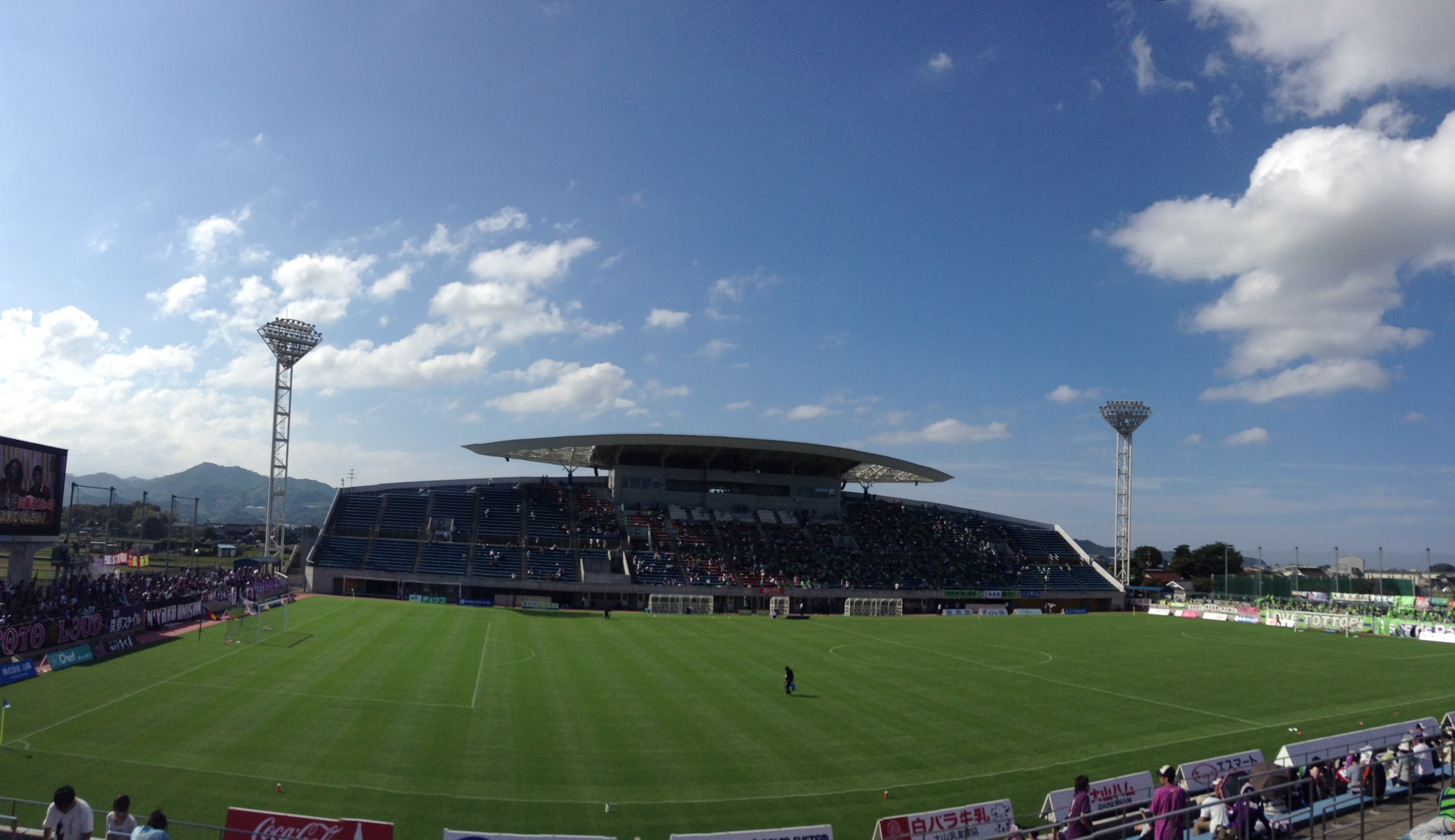
Axis Bird Stadium.

The sports teams listed below are based in Tottori.

- Football (soccer)
  - Gainare Tottori (Yonago)

== Education ==
=== Universities ===
- Tottori University
- Tottori University of Environmental Studies

=== Colleges ===
- Tottori College
- Tottori College of Nursing

== Noted places ==
=== Tottori City ===
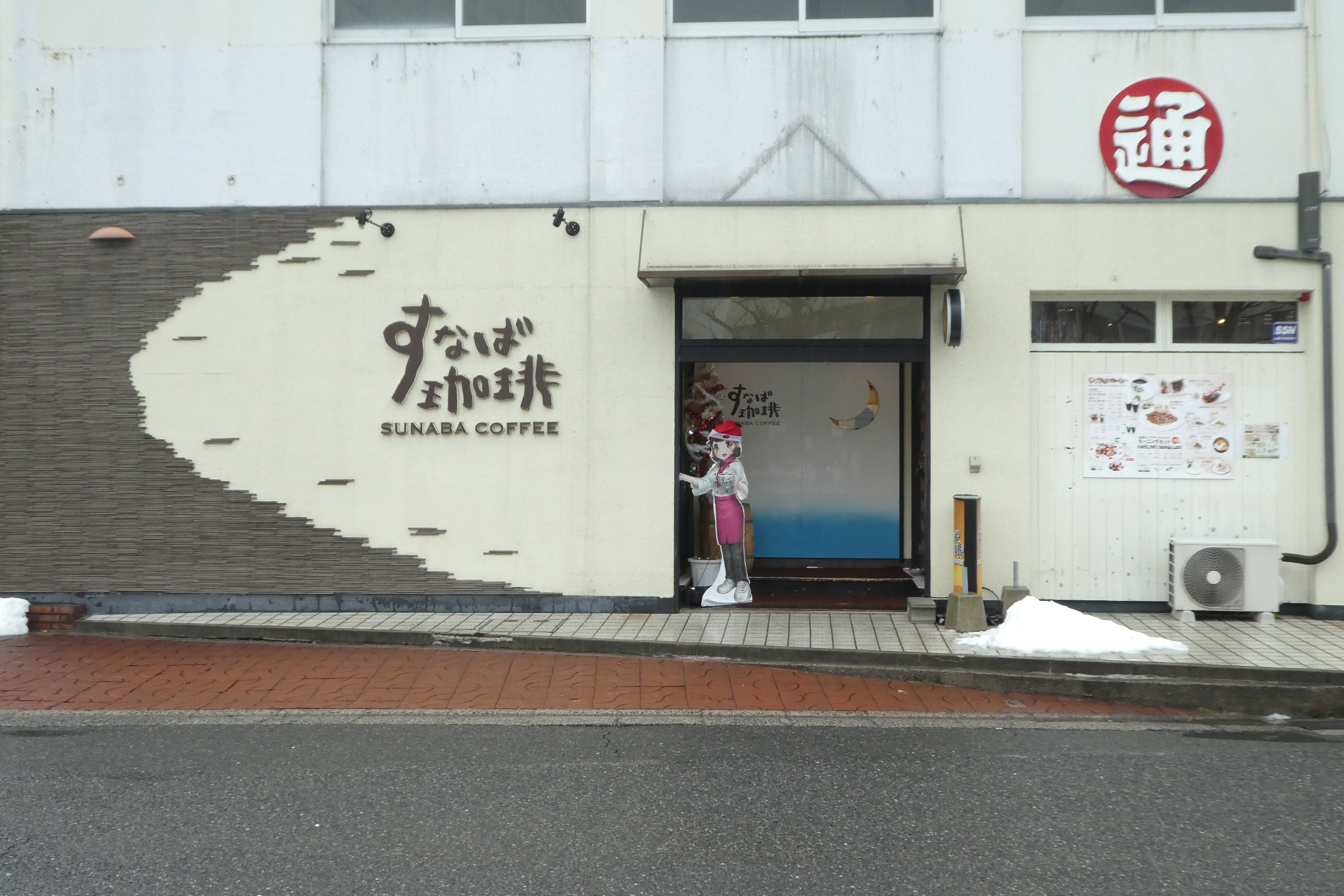
Sunaba Coffee House, a well known Coffeehouse in Tottori

- Jinpūkaku, a late Meiji period residence
- Tottori Sand Dunes

=== Daisen ===
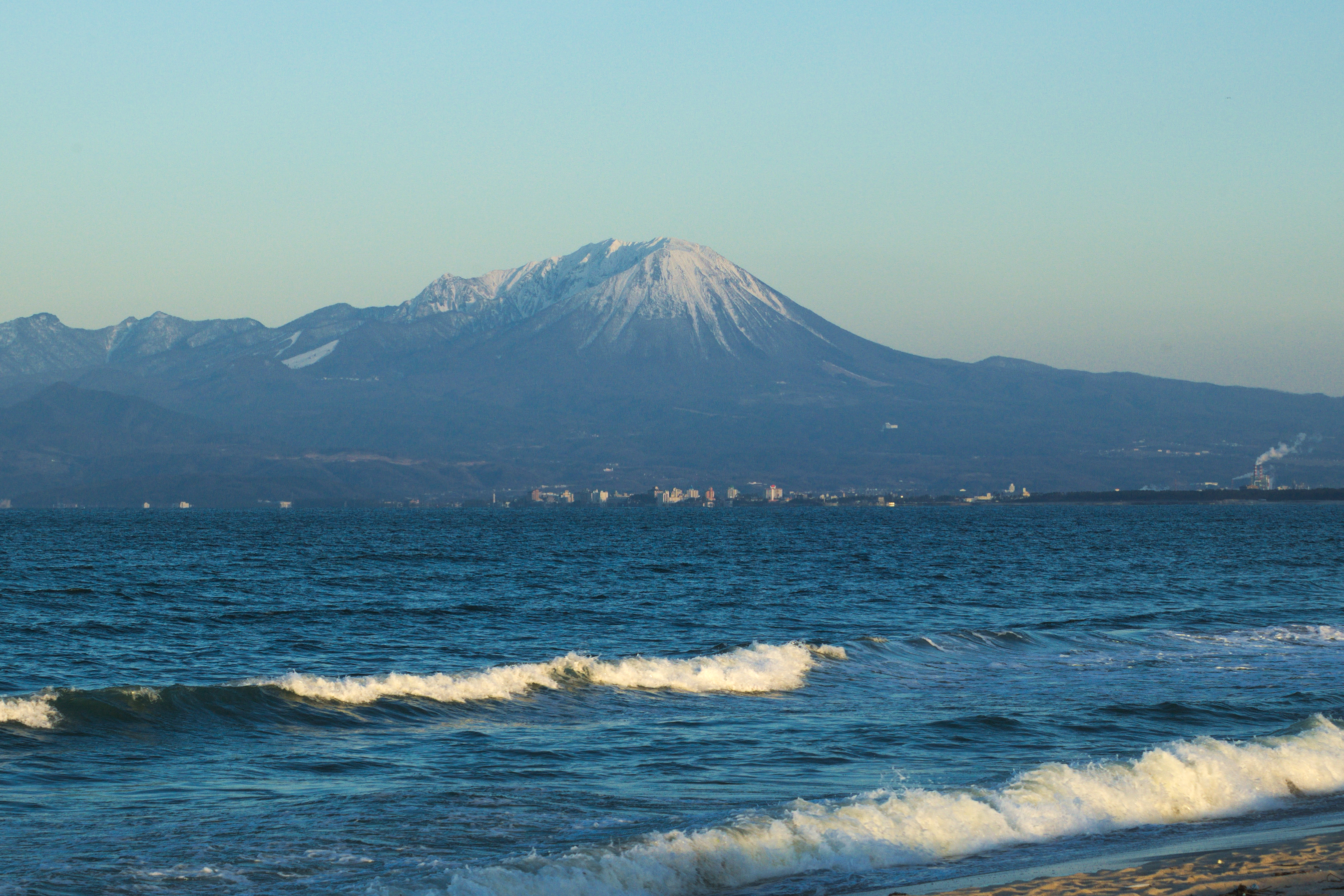
Panoramic view of Mount Daisen, Yonago

- Daisen, the highest of the Chūgoku Mountains, 1,729 m (5,673 ft)

=== Daisen and Yonago ===
- Mukibanda Yayoi remains, the largest site of Yayoi period settlement in Japan

=== Yonago and Sakaiminato ===
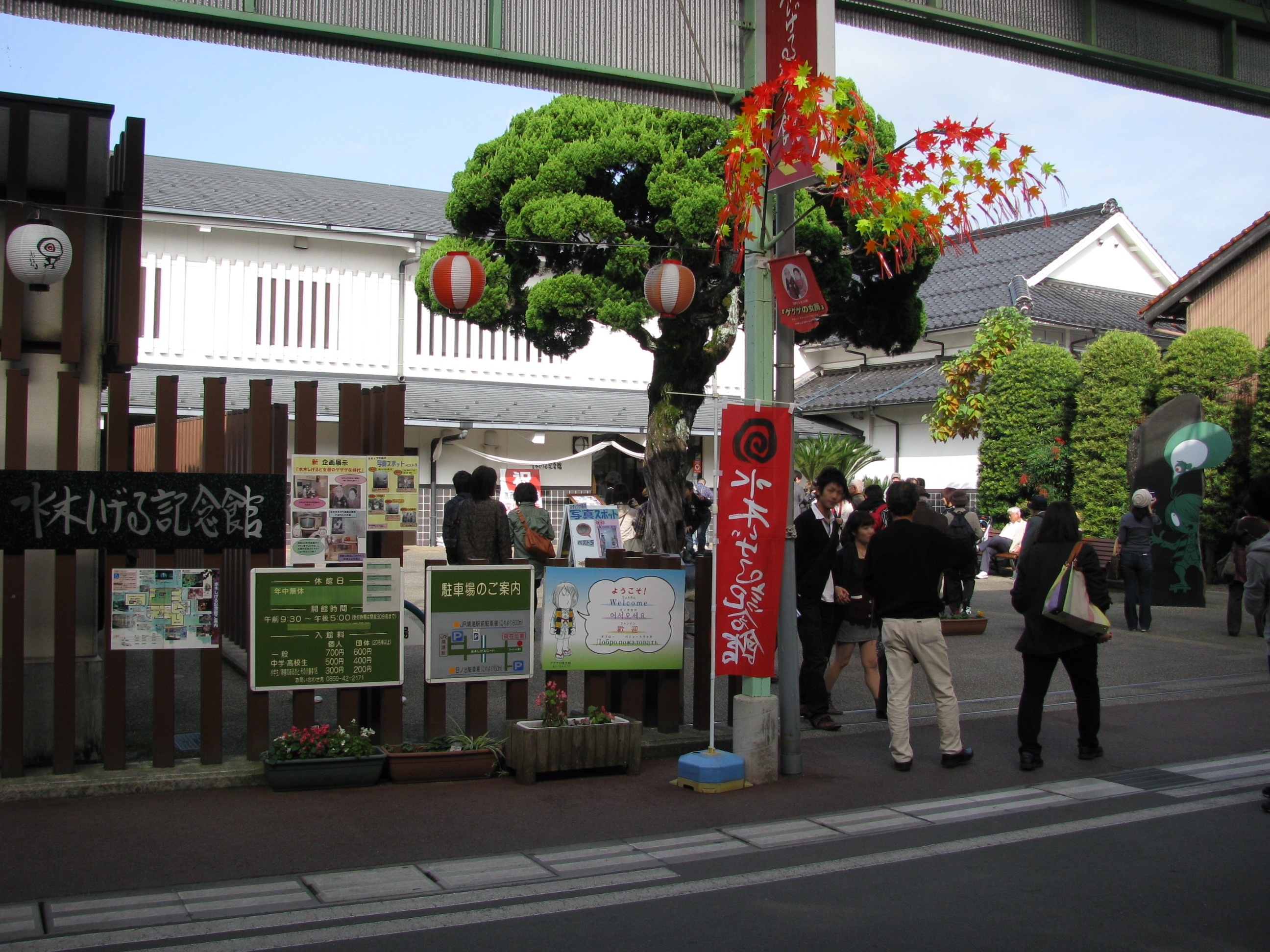
View of Sakaiminato Mizuki Shigeru Memorial Hall and Character's Statue

- Nakaumi, a brackish lake located between Tottori Prefecture and Shimane Prefecture, fifth largest lake in Japan

=== Misasa ===
- Misasa Onsen
- Sanbutsu-ji, a Heian period temple designated a National Treasure of Japan

=== Sakaiminato ===
- Kitarō Road, a street in Sakaiminato dedicated to Shigeru Mizuki's GeGeGe no Kitaro manga character
- Lake Koyama

=== Iwami ===
- Uradome Coast, a scenic ria coastal inlet

=== Chizu ===
- The Ishitani Residence, an Edo period family residence designated a National Treasure of Japan

=== Nanbu ===
- Tottori Hanakairo-Flower Park, the largest flower park in Japan

== Transportation ==
=== Rail ===
- JR West
  - Sanin Line
  - Hakubi Line
  - Inbi Line
  - Sakai Line
- Wakasa Railway
- Chizu Express

=== Roads ===
==== Expressway and toll roads ====
- Tottori Expressway
- Yonago Expressway
- Sanin Expressway
- Shidosaka Pass Road
- Tottori-Toyooka-Miyazu Road

==== National highways ====
- Route 9
- Route 29 (Tottori-Shiso-Himeji)
- Route 53 (Tottori-Tsuyama-Okayama)
- Route 178
- Route 179
- Route 180
- Route 181 (Yonago-Niimi-Okayama)
- Route 183
- Route 313
- Route 373
- Route 431
- Route 482

=== Ports ===
- Sakaiminato Port – ferry route to Oki Island, and international container hub

=== Airports ===
- Tottori Airport
- Yonago Airport

== Prefectural symbols ==
The symbol is derived from the first mora in Japanese for "と" combined with the picture of a flying bird, and symbolizes peace, liberty, and the advancement of the Tottori Prefecture. It was enacted in 1968 to celebrate the 100th year from the first year of the Meiji Era.
