= Tajima Sangaku Prefectural Natural Park =

Natural park of Hyogo prefecture, Japan

- 但馬山岳県立自然公園
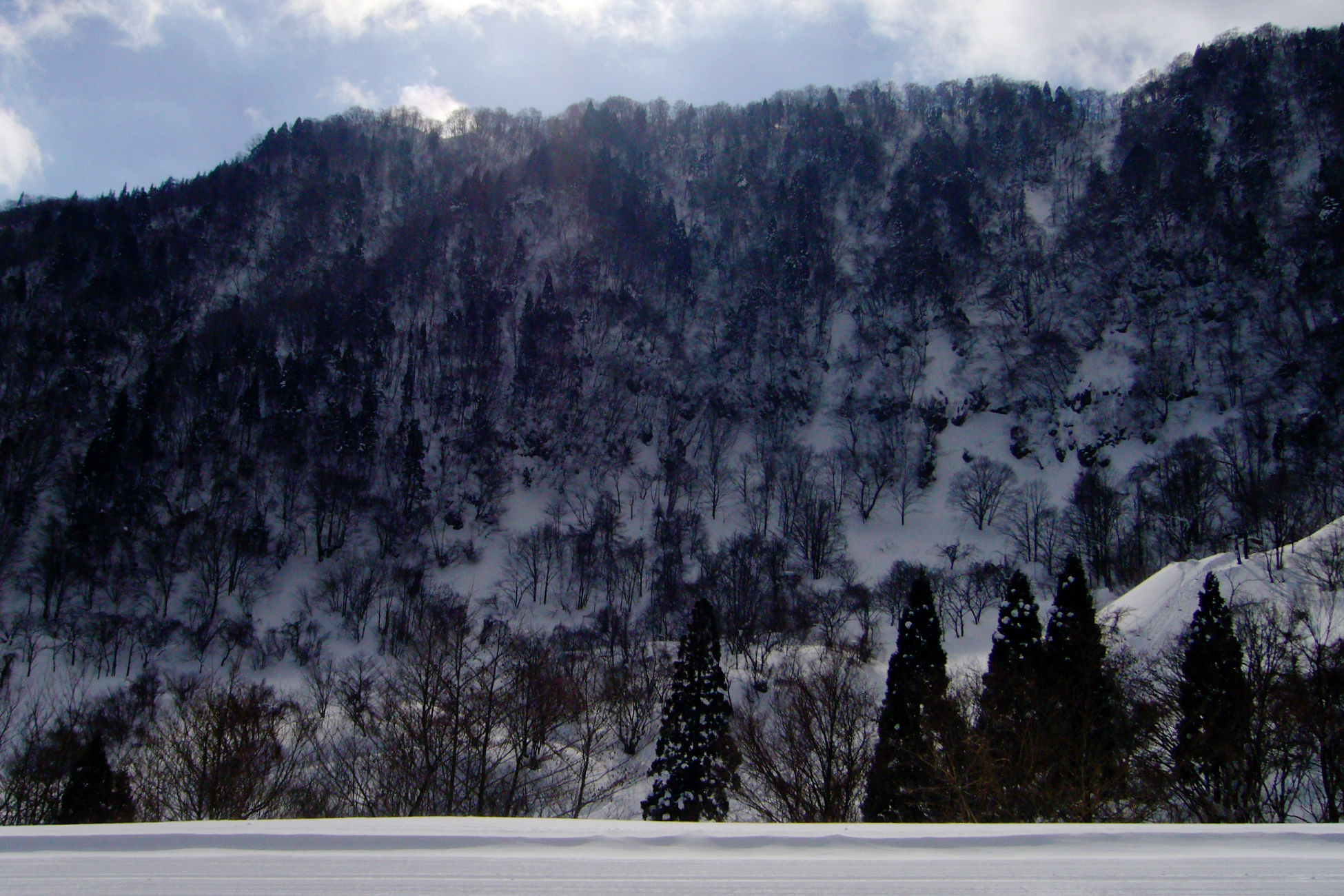
- Mount Hyōno
- Interactive map of Tajima Sangaku Prefectural Natural Park
- Location: Hyōgo Prefecture, Japan
- Area: 330.83 km^{2} (127.73 sq mi)
- Established: 21 July 1959

Tajima Sangaku Prefectural Natural Park (但馬山岳県立自然公園, Tajima Sangaku kenritsu shizen kōen) is a Prefectural Natural Park in northern Hyōgo Prefecture, Japan. Established in 1959, the park spans the municipalities of Kami, Shin'onsen, Toyooka, and Yabu. The designation of the park protects the habitat of the Japanese giant salamander (Special Natural Monument), Japanese macaque, and tanuki.

== See also ==
- National Parks of Japan
- Hyōnosen-Ushiroyama-Nagisan Quasi-National Park
