= Wakasa, Tottori =

Wakasa Tottori 若桜町
- Town
- Flag Seal
- Location of Wakasa in Tottori Prefecture

- Location in Japan
- Coordinates: 35°20′N 134°24′E
- Country: Japan
- Region: Chūgoku; San'in
- Prefecture: Tottori
- District: Yazu

Area
  - Total: 199.18 km^{2} (76.90 sq mi)

Population (December 1, 2022)
  - Total: 2,852
  - Density: 14.32/km^{2} (37.09/sq mi)
- Time zone: UTC+09:00 (JST)
- Website: Official website

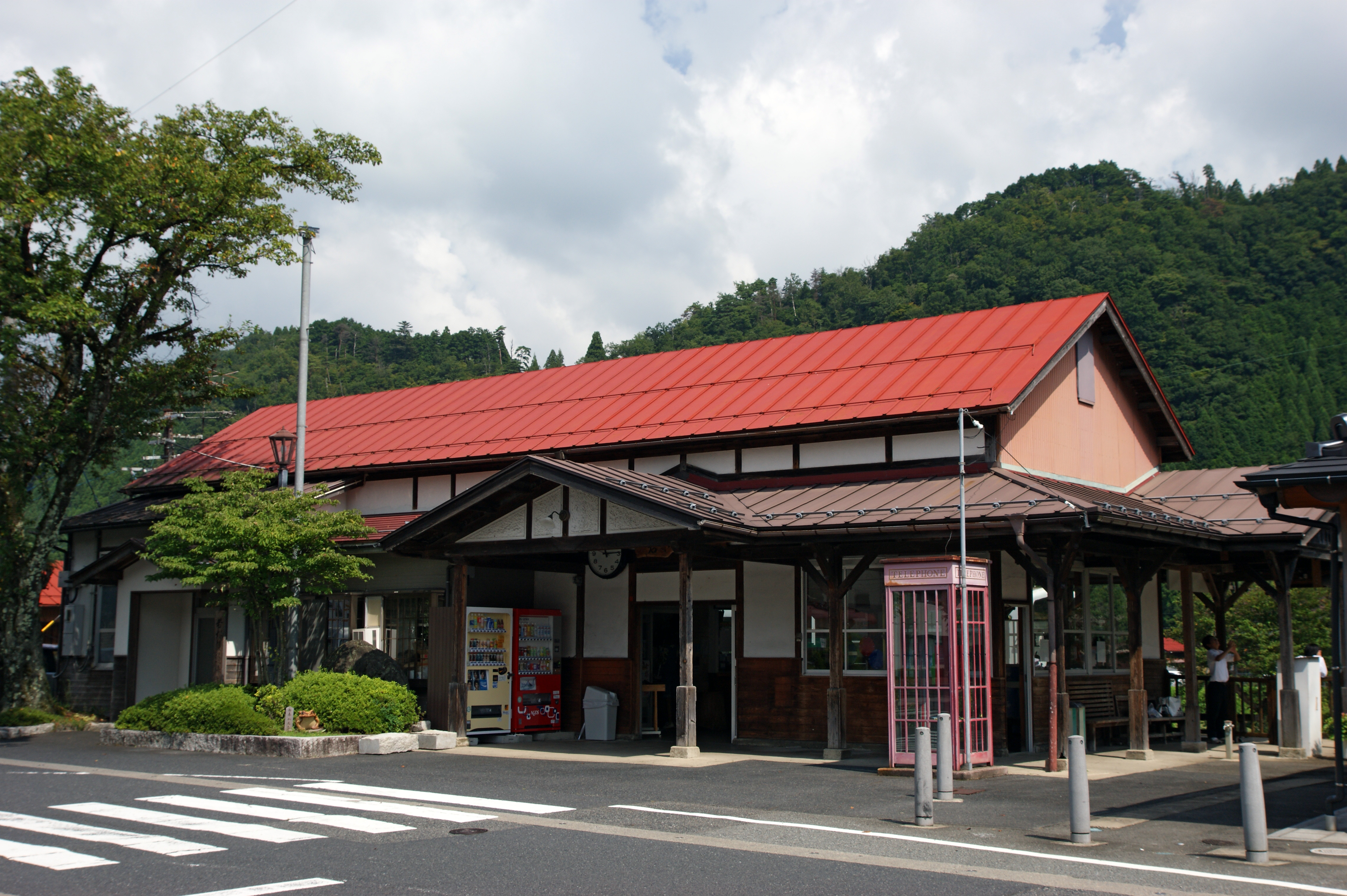
Wakasa Station

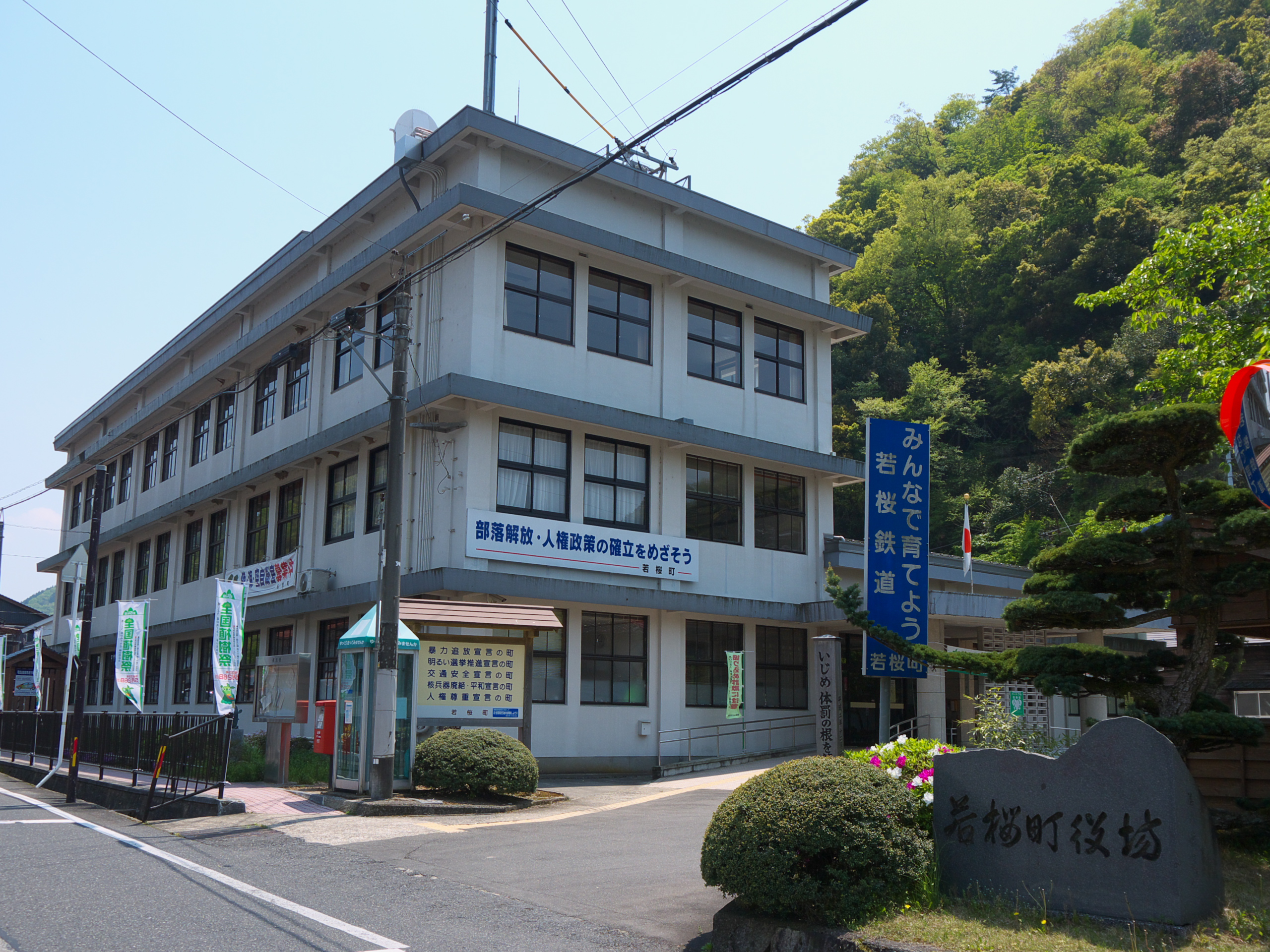
Wakasa Town Hall

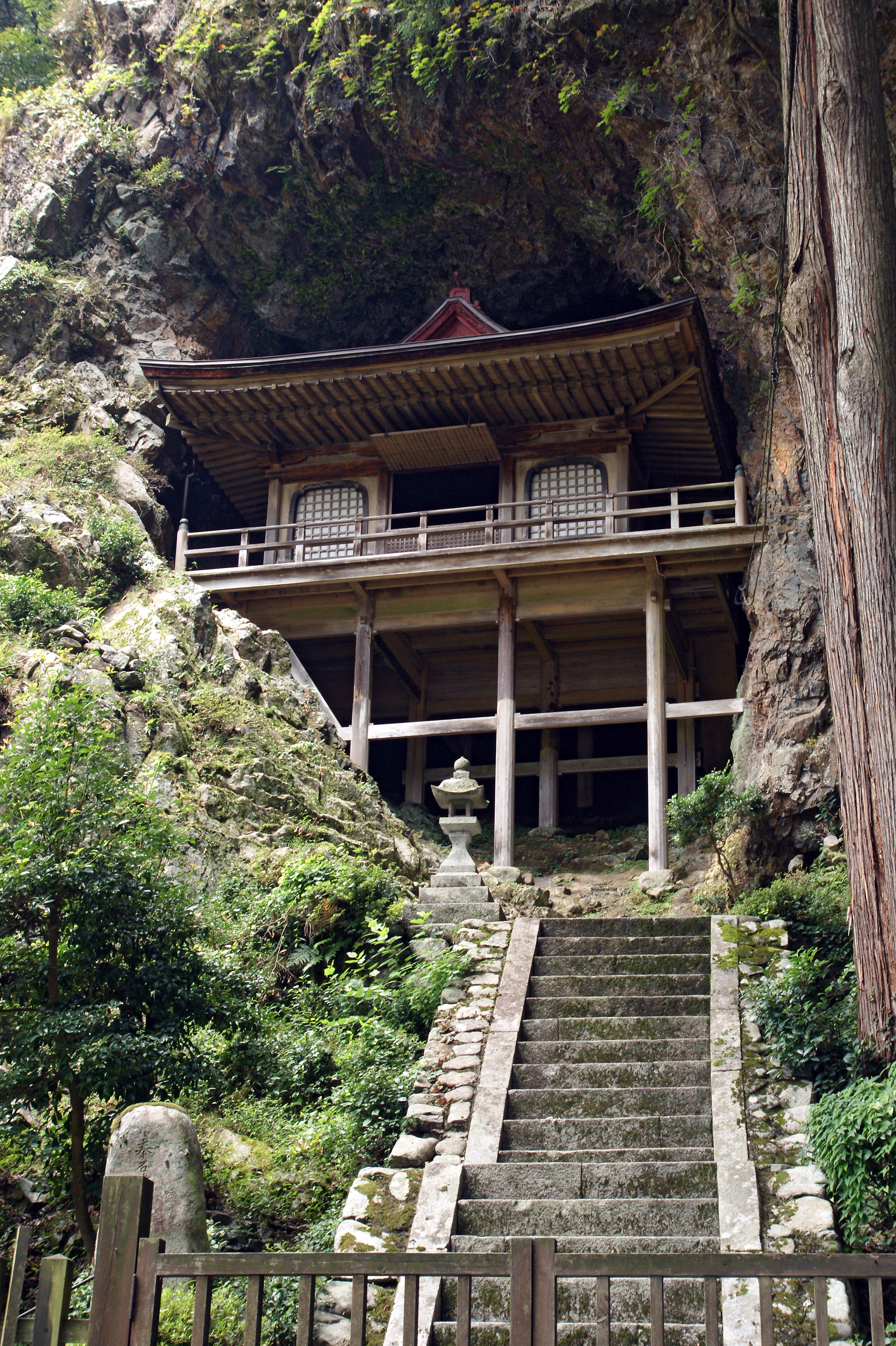
Fudōin Iwaya-dō, built by Minamoto no Yoritomo in the early Kamakura period

Wakasa (若桜町, Wakasa-chō) is a town located in Yazu District, Tottori Prefecture, Japan. As of 30 November 2022, the town had an estimated population of 2,852 in 1,285 households and a population density of 14 persons per km^{2}. The total area of the town is 199.18 square kilometres (76.90 sq mi).

Wakasa, located deep in the Chūgoku Mountains, is 95% mountainous. The population of Wakasa is primarily located in mountain villages in a line from the southeast to northwest of the town. Most of the population is located along the Hattō River or its small tributaries.

The town hosts an annual 'Yukigassen', an organised snowball fighting tournament in which up to fifty teams participate. The winners win a trip to participate in the Hokkaido grand tournament.

== Geography ==
Wakasa is largely rural and located centrally in the Chūgoku Mountains. Prominent mountains in the town include Mount Hyōno(1,509.6 metres (4,953 ft)), Mount Mimuro (1,358 metres (4,455 ft)), Ōginosen (1,309.9 metres (4,298 ft)), and Mount Shinbachi (1,207 metres (3,960 ft)). The area of the town along the border with Hyōgo Prefecture is part of Hyōnosen-Ushiroyama-Nagisan Quasi-National Park.

The Hattō River (39.1 kilometres (24.3 mi)), the largest tributary of the Sendai River, emerges from Tokura Ridge on the border of Wakasa and Shisō, Hyōgo Prefecture. The Hattō flows from the southwest foot of Mount Hyōno through the town and joins the Sendai in the Kawaramachi area of Tottori City.

=== Bordering municipalities ===
Wakasa, while located in Tottori Prefecture, borders Hyōgo and Okayama prefectures. Hyōgo Prefecture

- Kami
- Shinonsen
- Shisō
- Yabu

Okayama Prefecture

- Nishiawakura

Tottori Prefecture

- Chizu
- Tottori
- Yazu

=== Climate ===
Wakasa has a humid subtropical climate (Köppen Cfa) characterized by warm summers and cool winters with moderate snowfall. The average annual temperature in Wakasa is 10.8 °C. The average annual rainfall is 1982 mm with September as the wettest month. The temperatures are highest on average in August, at around 22.8 °C, and lowest in January, at around -1.3 °C.

== Demographics ==
Per Japanese census data, the population of Wakasa has been as follows:

Historical population
Year	Pop.	±%
1920	8,905	—
1930	8,681	−2.5%
1940	8,399	−3.2%
1950	9,594	+14.2%
1960	9,616	+0.2%
1970	7,443	−22.6%
1980	6,633	−10.9%
1990	6,004	−9.5%
2000	4,998	−16.8%
2010	3,876	−22.4%

== History ==
=== Early history ===
The mountainous areas of Wakasa do not appear to have supported a population in early Japanese history. No remains from the Jōmon (14,000 – 300 BCE) or Yayoi (300 BCE – 250 CE) periods have been found in Wakasa. The town had two or three small settlements in the Kofun period (250–538). Wakasa became part of Yakami District in Inaba Province early in recorded Japanese history. Settlements in the area are appeared early in the Heian period (794–1185), and the name of a village called "Wakasa" first appear in the historical record this time. The Yabe clan controlled Wakasa throughout the Heian period to the end of the Kamakura period (1185 – 1333). The Yabe built Wakasa Oniga Castle in this period.^{A} The existence of the Yabe clan and Oniga castle are noted in the Taiheiki, a Japanese historical epic written in the late 14th century.

=== Later history ===
Wakasa, located in a richly forested area of the Chūgoku Mountains, was a source of lumber and lumber products from early times. The production of raw timber, planks, charcoal, and firewood is noted as early as the Kamakura period. These products, as well as rice, were transported on the Hattō River for export to other parts of Japan via the Japan Sea. At the beginning of the Edo period (1603–1868) the Tokugawa shogunate developed land for rice paddies in Wakasa as part of a nationwide effort to increase rice production in Japan. The mountainous areas of Wakasa provided extensive irrigation for rice-producing areas in the flatlands of the lower Sendai River, but Wakasa suffered frequent flooding from the Hattō River, notably in 1815 and 1888. After the Meiji Restoration in 1868 Wakasa became part of the newly formed Tottori Prefecture. The town was officially incorporated under administrative reforms by the Meiji government in 1889.

== Government ==
Wakasa has a mayor-council form of government with a directly elected mayor and a unicameral town council of 10 members headed by a chairperson. Wakasa, collectively with the other municipalities of Yazu District, contributes two members to the Tottori Prefectural Assembly. In terms of national politics, the town is part of Tottori 1st district of the lower house of the Diet of Japan.

== Education ==
Wakasa has one public combined elementary/middle school operated by the town government. The town does not have a high school

== Economy ==
Wakasa has historically been a center of the lumber trade, but is now also known for its production of daikon radish and other agricultural products.

== Transportation ==
=== Railway ===
Wakasa Railway - Wakasa Line

- Wakasa

=== Highways ===
- National Route 29
- National Route 482

== Local attractions ==
- Wakasa Oniga Castle, National Historic Site
- Wakasa Shrine
