= Sendai River (Tottori) =

River in Tottori Prefecture, Japan

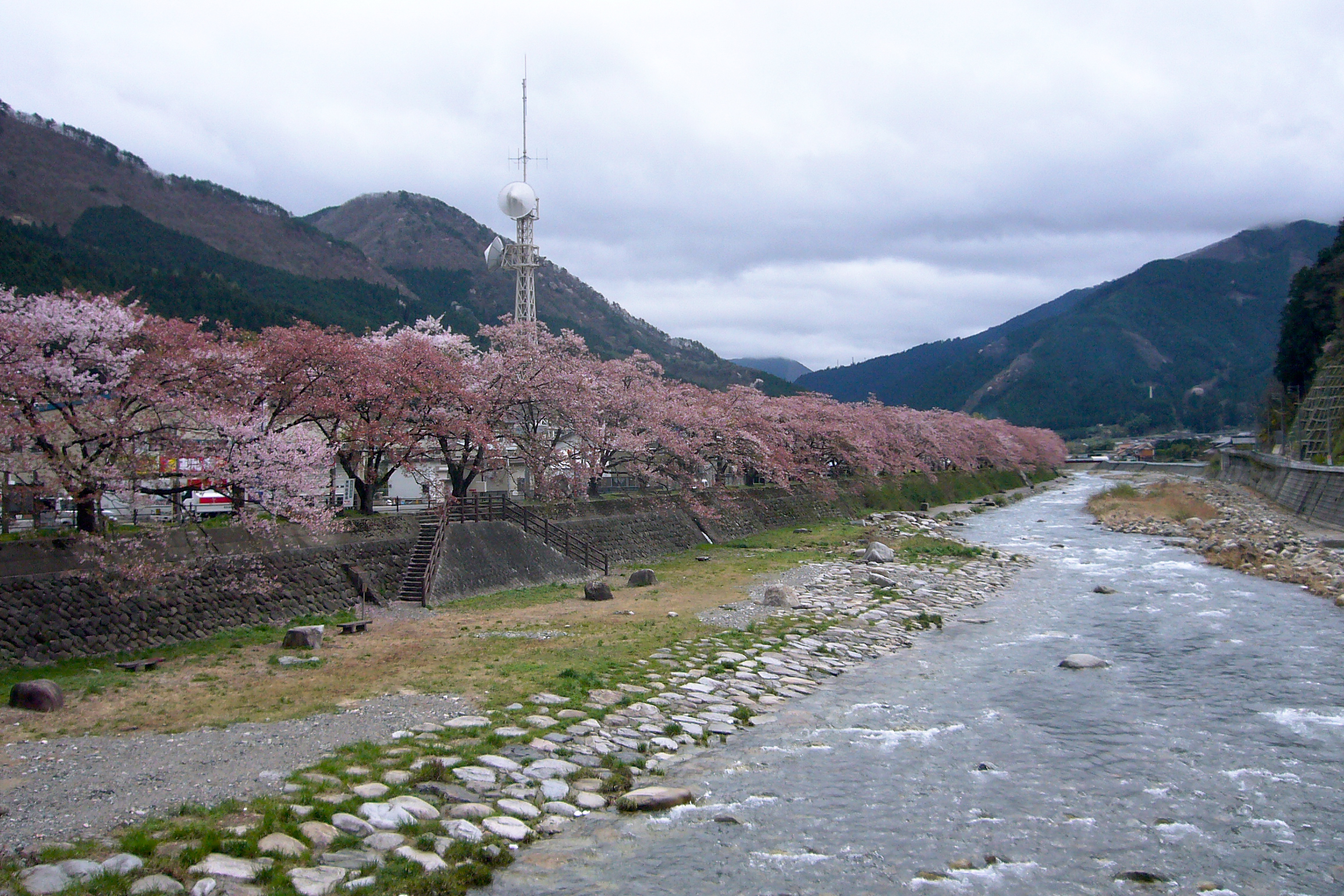
- Cherry blossoms along the banks of the Sendai River, in Chizu chō, Tottori, Tottori Prefecture

- Native name: 千代川 (Japanese)

Location
- Country: Japan

Physical characteristics
- Source
  - location: Okinosen and Mount Nagi
- Mouth
  - location: Japan Sea
  - coordinates: 35°32′29″N 134°11′44″E
  - elevation: 0 m (0 ft)
- Length: 52 km (32 mi)
- Basin size: 1,190 km^{2} (460 sq mi)
- Discharge
  - average: 47.55 m^{3}/s (1,679 cu ft/s)

The Sendai River (千代川, Sendai-gawa) is a river in eastern Tottori Prefecture, Japan. The Sendai is 52 kilometers (32 mi) in length and has a drainage area of 1,190 square kilometers (460 sq mi). The source of the river is in the Chūgoku Mountains. The Sendai flows north through Tottori Prefecture into the Sea of Japan. Under the Rivers Act of 1964 it is designated a Class 1 River, and is managed by the Japanese Ministry of Land, Infrastructure, Transport and Tourism. About 200,000 people live along the course of the river. The Sendai River provides sediment to form the Tottori Sand Dunes, the largest dune system in Japan.

== Geography ==
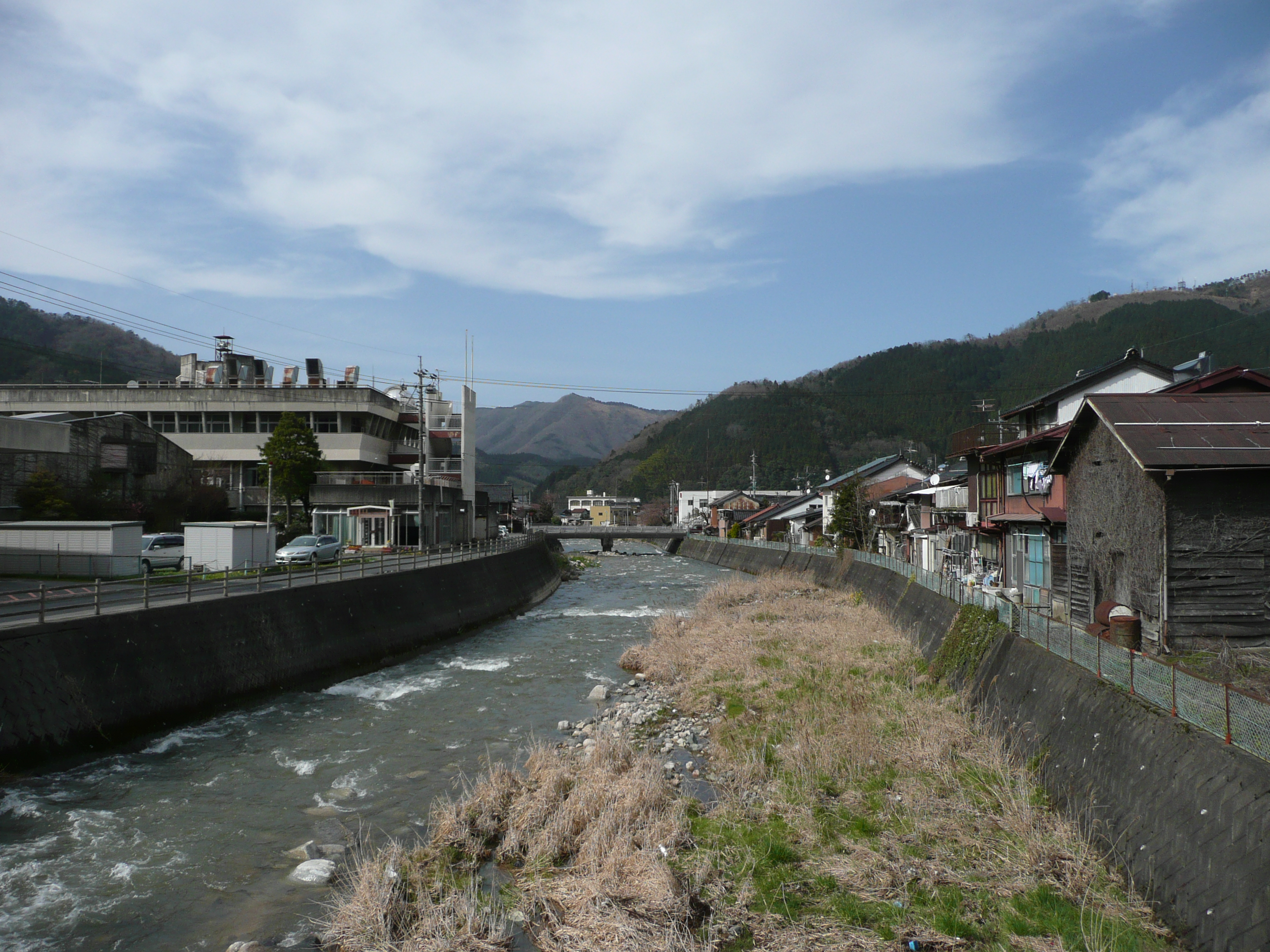
Middle reaches of the Sendai River, Chizu, Tottori Prefecture

=== Upper reaches ===
The source of the Sendai River is in the vicinity of Okinosen (1,318.8 metres; 4,327 ft) and Mount Nagi (1,255 metres; 4,117 ft), deep in the Chūgoku Mountains on the border of Tottori and Okayama prefectures. Several tributaries of the Sendai similarly emerge from the Chūgoku Mountains in this area, and form a fan-shaped area before flowing into the main course of the Sendai River. The region of gorges and ravines is commonly known as 峯岐 (Hōki) by residents of the area. The upper reaches of the Sendai and its tributaries is protected as part of Hyōnosen-Ushiroyama-Nagisan Quasi-National Park (488.03 square kilometres; 188.43 mi^{2}), established in 1969.

=== Middle reaches ===
In its middle reaches the Sendai River emerges from the Chūgoku Mountains and flows northward through the Tottori Plain. The microrelief of the Tottori Plain reveals that the Sendai once meandered across the plain, rather than following a straight course. Two major canals have been constructed from the Sendai on the Tottori Plain: the Yamashirogawa Canal (山白川用水, Yamashiro-gawa Yōsui) from its right (eastern) bank, and the Ōide Canal (大井手用水, Ōide-gawa Yōsui), also known as the Ōide River, from its left (western) bank. Original construction on the Ōide Canal was carried out in 1600 by the feudal lord Kamei Korenori (亀井武蔵) (1557–1612) in order to open arable land in the region. The history of the construction of the Yamashirogawa Canal is unclear; the remaining earthworks suggest a history similar to that of the Ōide. The Ikeda clan, rulers of Tottori Castle throughout the Edo period, recorded significant work on the Fukuro River directly north of the canal, but left no written record of work on the Yamashirogawa. The Sendai and its canals currently provide irrigation for 7,600 hectares (19,000 acres) of rice paddies in the Tottori Plain.

=== Lower reaches ===
The mouth of the Sendai River is in the Karo district of the city of Tottori, where it empties into the Japan Sea. Sediment from the Sendai River at the Sea of Japan forms the Tottori Sand Dunes. The lowest reaches and the mouth of the Sendai River are protected as part of Sanin Kaigan National Park (87.83 square kilometres; 33.91 mi^{2}), and the Tottori Sand Dunes are designated a Natural Monument of Japan. Lake Koyama (6.9 square kilometres; 2.7 mi^{2}), a brackish lagoon to the west of the mouth of the Sendai River, was once an inlet of the Sea of Japan. Sediments from the Sendai blocked the mouth of the inlet over time, separating Lake Koyama from the Sea of Japan.

=== Jurisdictions ===
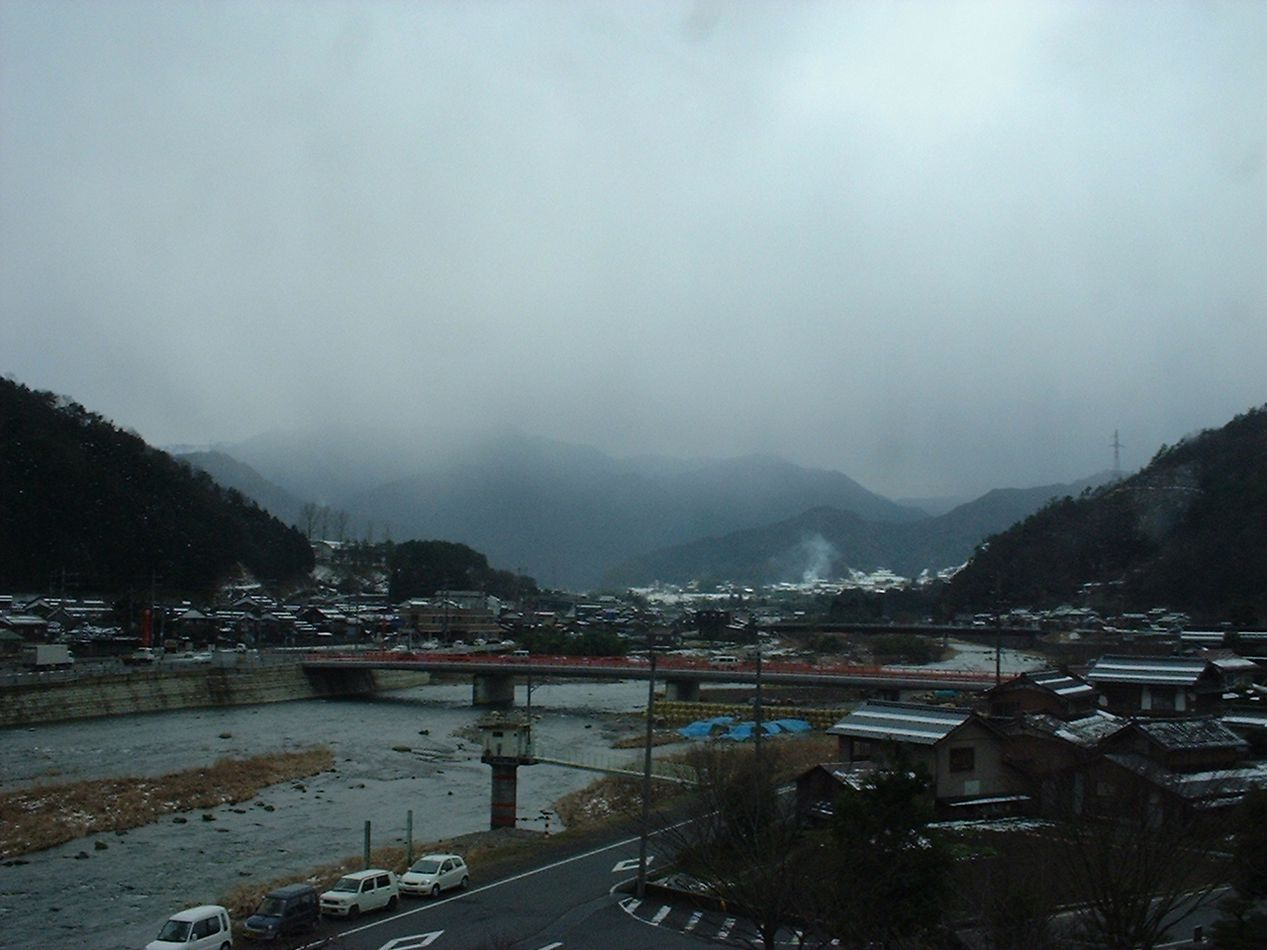
Sendai River at Mochigase, Tottori

- Tottori Prefecture
  - City of Tottori
  - Chizu

=== Tributaries ===
The tributaries of the Sendai River emerge from the Chūgoku Mountains and flow through low-lying valleys and tableland in the eastern reaches of Tottori Prefecture. Several tributaries are dammed to produce hydroelectric power. There are approximately 71 tributaries of the Sendai, and the major tributaries include:

- Saji River (佐治川, Saji-gawa)
- Hattō River (八東川, Hattō-gawa)
- Sunami River (砂見川, Sunami-gawa)
- Kisaichi River (私都川, Kisaichi-gawa)
- Fukuro River (袋川, Fukuro-gawa)
- Nosaka River (野坂川, Nosaka-gawa)

== Tottori Sand Dunes ==
The Sendai River is essential to the formation of the Tottori Sand Dunes, which with an area of 30 square kilometres (12 mi^{2}) are the largest dune system in Japan. The dunes were created by and are replenished by granitic deposits, specifically quartz, feldspar, lithic fragments, and amphibole. The sediments are carried from the Chūgoku Mountains down the river into the Sea of Japan. Fine sand from the sediments of the Sendai is carried back to the shore by currents and tides of the Sea of Japan, and then blown by wind to form the dunes. The Hamasaka area of the Tottori Sand Dunes, directly east of the mouth of the Sendai River, is 4 kilometres (2.5 mi) and 1 kilometre (0.62 mi) wide. The Hamasaka sand dune has little vegetation and is considered the best-preserved dune of the system. The Tottori Sand Dunes have shrunk by approximately 130 feet (40 m) between 1947 and 2003, in part due to the construction of sea walls at the Port of Tottori.

== Environmental conditions ==
Illegal dumping of household garbage by residents on the Sendai River, notably on the Fukuro River tributary, is an ongoing environmental problems. Signs pointing out the illegality of dumping have been posted since 2009, and although there has been a reduction of dumping, the problem remains.

== Environment ==
The areas near the mouth of the Sendai are noted for plant species which thrive in sandy areas, notably Calystegia soldanella, the beach morning glory. Stands of black pines are found in the same area. Miscanthus sacchariflorus, or Amur silver-grass, is found in the lower reaches of the Sendai where the river has a weaker current. Celtis jessoensis, the Japanese hackberry, and Aphananthe aspera, the Muku tree, are found along the lowest 10 kilometres (6.2 mi) of the river.

== History ==
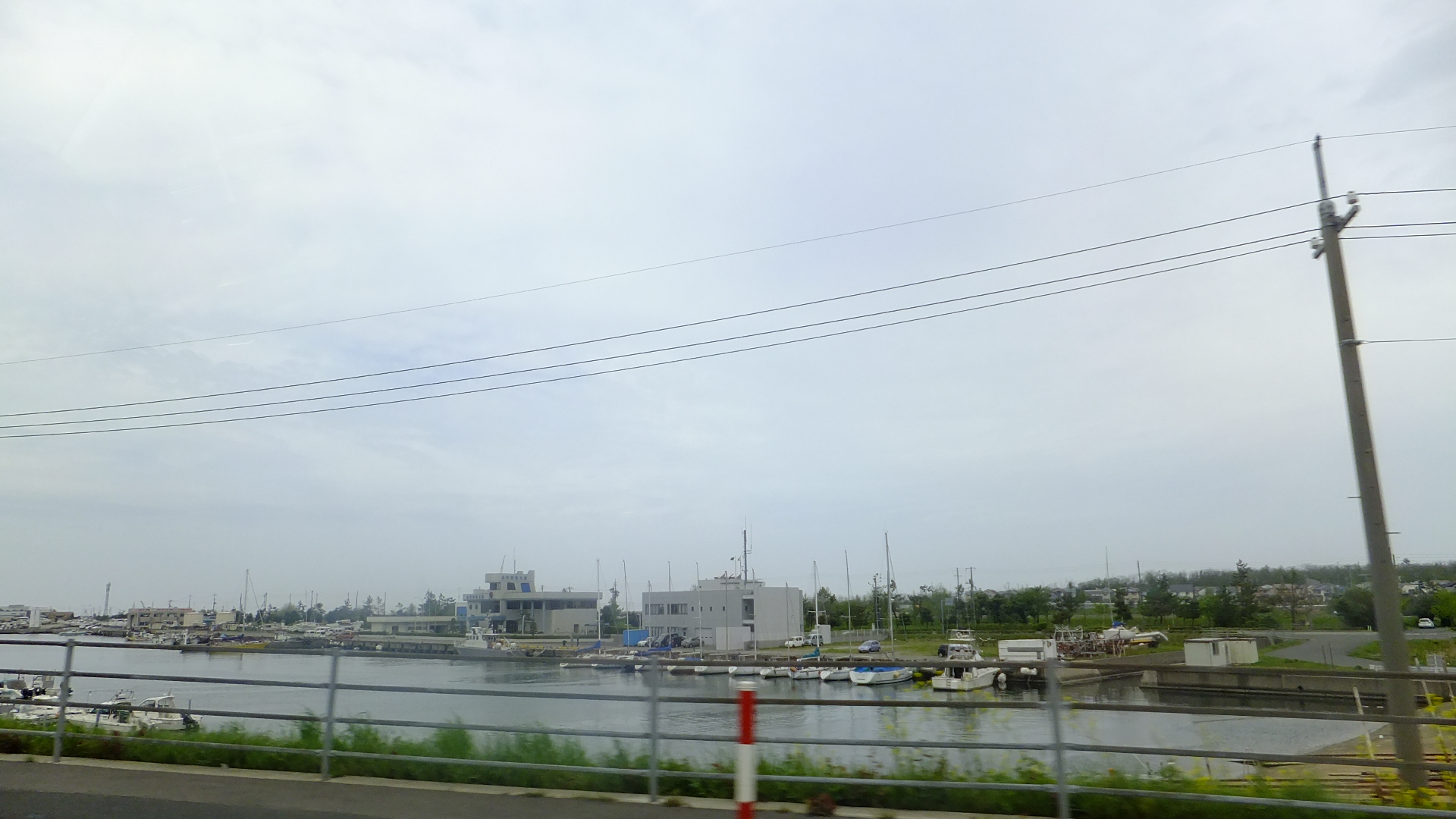
Sendai River at the Port of Tottori

The Sendai River crossed historical Inaba Province, which made up the eastern half of present-day Tottori Prefecture. The river was used for transportation from early times, and as an inland water transportation link after the development of rice paddies on the middle reaches of the river. Rice was transported from the Tottori Plain south to the port at the mouth of the river. The Sendai River flowed near the jōkamachi (castle town) that emerged with the construction of Tottori Castle during the Sengoku period. The jōkamachi sat on low, damp ground, and suffered repeated damage due to flooding on the Sendai. In a 250-year period from the mid-18th century to the early 20th century, the Sendai flooded 100 times, roughly every three years. The urbanization of the city of Sendai caused even more frequent flooding.

Flood control works were carried out on the Sendai early in the 20th century. A major crook of the river above the mouth of the Sendai was straightened, and the river significantly widened, in 1930. The Fukuro River, a major tributary of the Sendai which meets the Sendai in Tottori City, had a new course excavated in 1934. The port at Tottori was heavily damaged by the Tottori earthquake of 1943 and a large fire in 1952. A plan to expand the Port of Tottori and straighten the lowest reaches of the river was made in this period. Construction of wharfs at the mouth of the river was completed in 1983. Typhoon Number 10 in 1998 caused a landslide behind a quarry along the Sendai. About 50,000 cubic metres (65,000 yd^{3}) of rock were dumped into the river.

== Culture ==
The tradition of floating dolls on the river, or nagashibina, began along the shallow rapids of the middle part of the Sendai River. The tradition continues today and is designated an Intangible Cultural Asset of Tottori Prefecture. Inshū-gami, a type of washi, or Japanese paper, was produced on the Sendai River from the early Edo period (1603–1868), and its production was regulated by the Tokugawa shogunate. The paper is still produced in Chizu.

== Transportation ==
Several roads and railroad lines follow the path of the Sendai River. The Chizu Line of the Chizu Express follows the river from Yamasato Station to Chizu Station. The JR West Inbi Line follows the Sendai from Chizu Station to Tottori Station. The Tottori Expressway follows the course of the river from its source to Tottori City. Japan National Route 53 and Japan National Route 373 follow the course of the Sendai in Chizu.
