= Mount Nagi =

Mountain in Okayama and Tottori prefectures, Japan

Coordinates: 35°10′11″N 134°10′40″E

- 那岐山
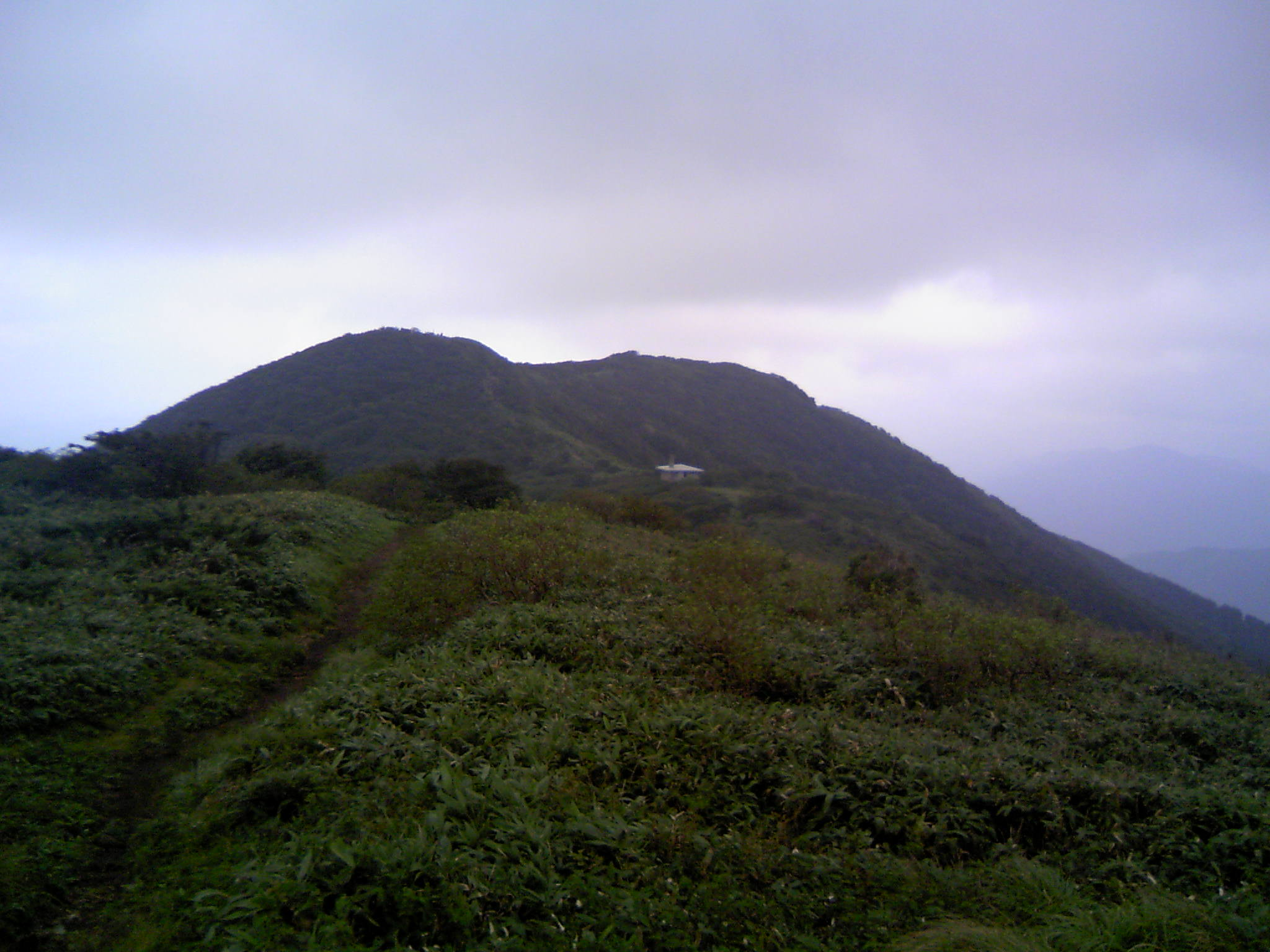
- Mount Nagi

Highest point
- Elevation: 1,255 m (4,117 ft)
- Listing: List of mountains and hills of Japan by height

Geography
- Location: Honshū, Japan
- Parent range: Chūgoku Mountains

Geology
- Mountain type: Monadoc

Mount Nagi (那岐山, Nagi-san), is a mountain located on the border of Chizu, Tottori Prefecture, and Nagi, Okayama Prefecture, Japan. The other reading of this mountain's kanji is Nagisen.

This mountain is an important part of Hyōnosen-Ushiroyama-Nagisan Quasi-National Park, with Mount Hyōno and Mount Ushiro.

== Outline ==
Mount Nagi is a typical monadnock in Chūgoku Mountain Range. This mountain is the fourth highest mountain in Okayama Prefecture, and one of Chūgoku 100 mountains. It is estimated as a fault block of old volcano.

About the origin of the name of Mount Nagi, there are two stories. One is that this mountain is named so because Izanagi no Mikoto and Izanami no Mikoto, who are a couple of the most important gods in Japanese myth, had come down from the heaven to this mountain. The other is because this mountain cried (naku in Japanese) when it was defeated by the height against Mount Ushiro.

With Mount Taki, west of Mount Nagi, the mountain are around Mount Nagi is said that it was a center of Shugendo.

== Hiking routes ==
There are three routes to climb up Mount Nagi; however, one of the three is closed because of the forest was destroyed by a typhoon.

== Access ==
- Koen Bus Stop of Chutetsu Bus

== Gallery ==
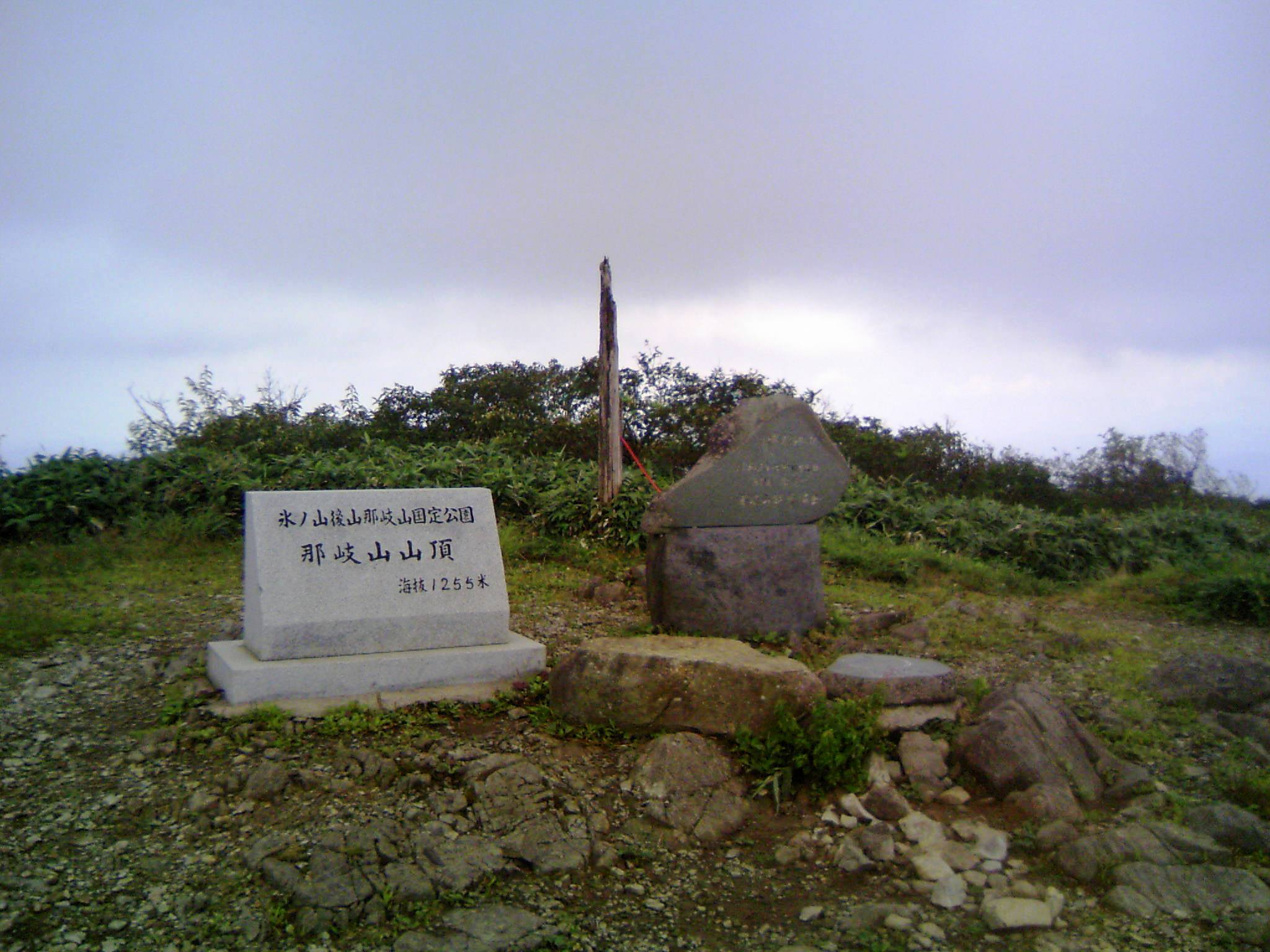
Top of Mount Nagisan mountains

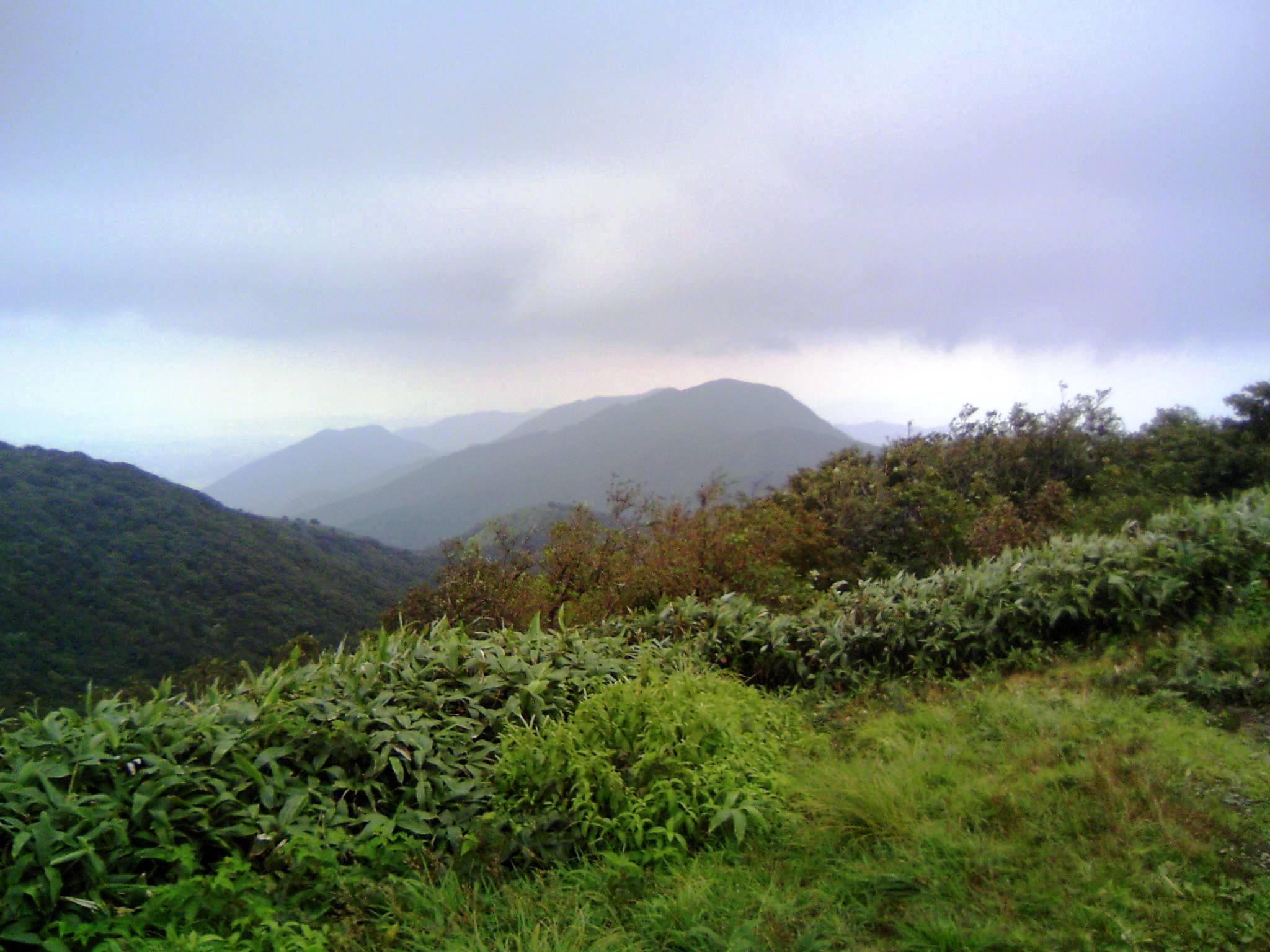
Mount Takisan from Mount Nagisan

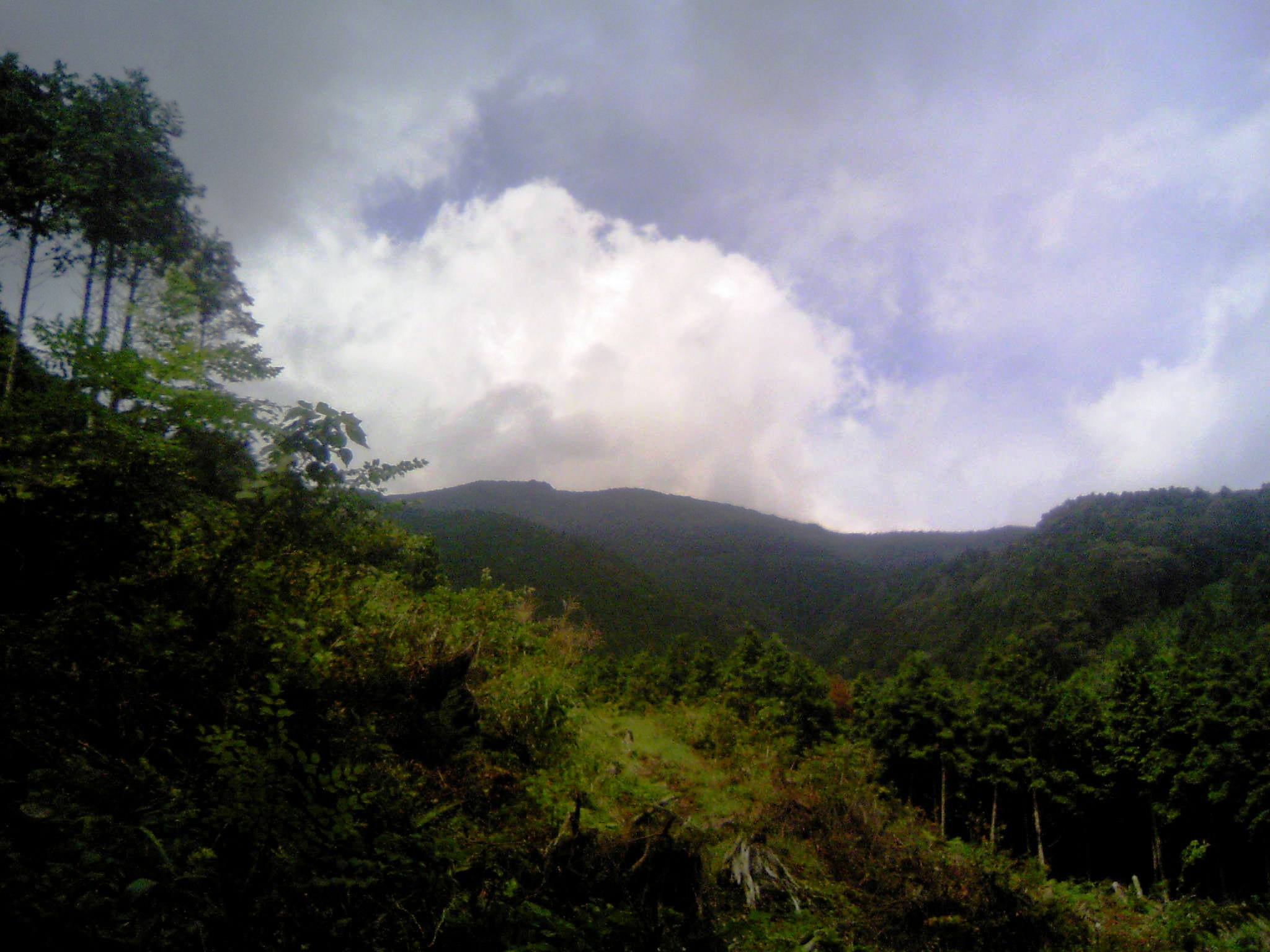
Mount Nagisan from the middle of the mountain

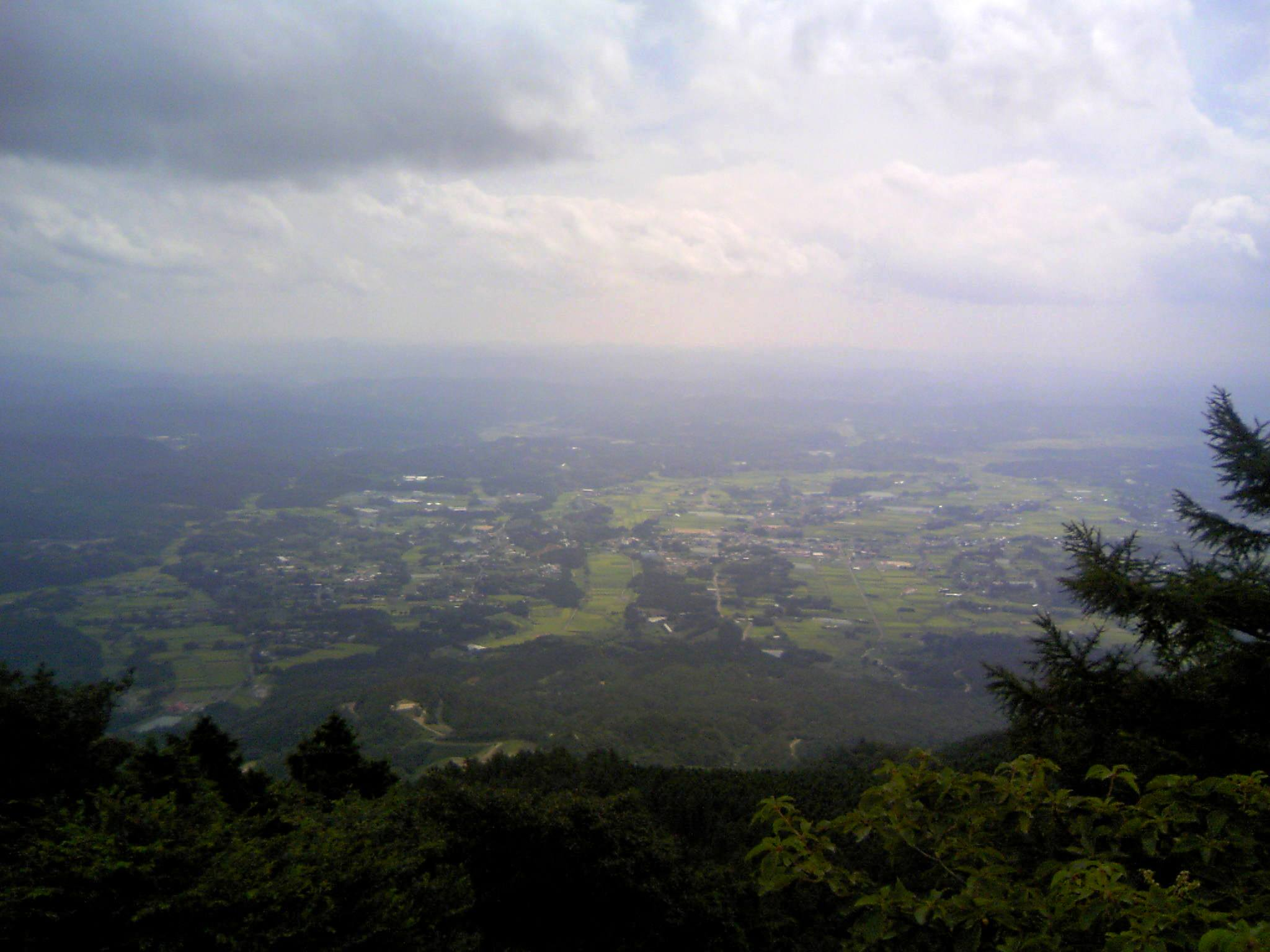
Nihonbara Plain from Mount Nagisan
