= Mount Ushiro =

Mountain in Hyōgo and Okayama Prefectures, Japan

- 後山
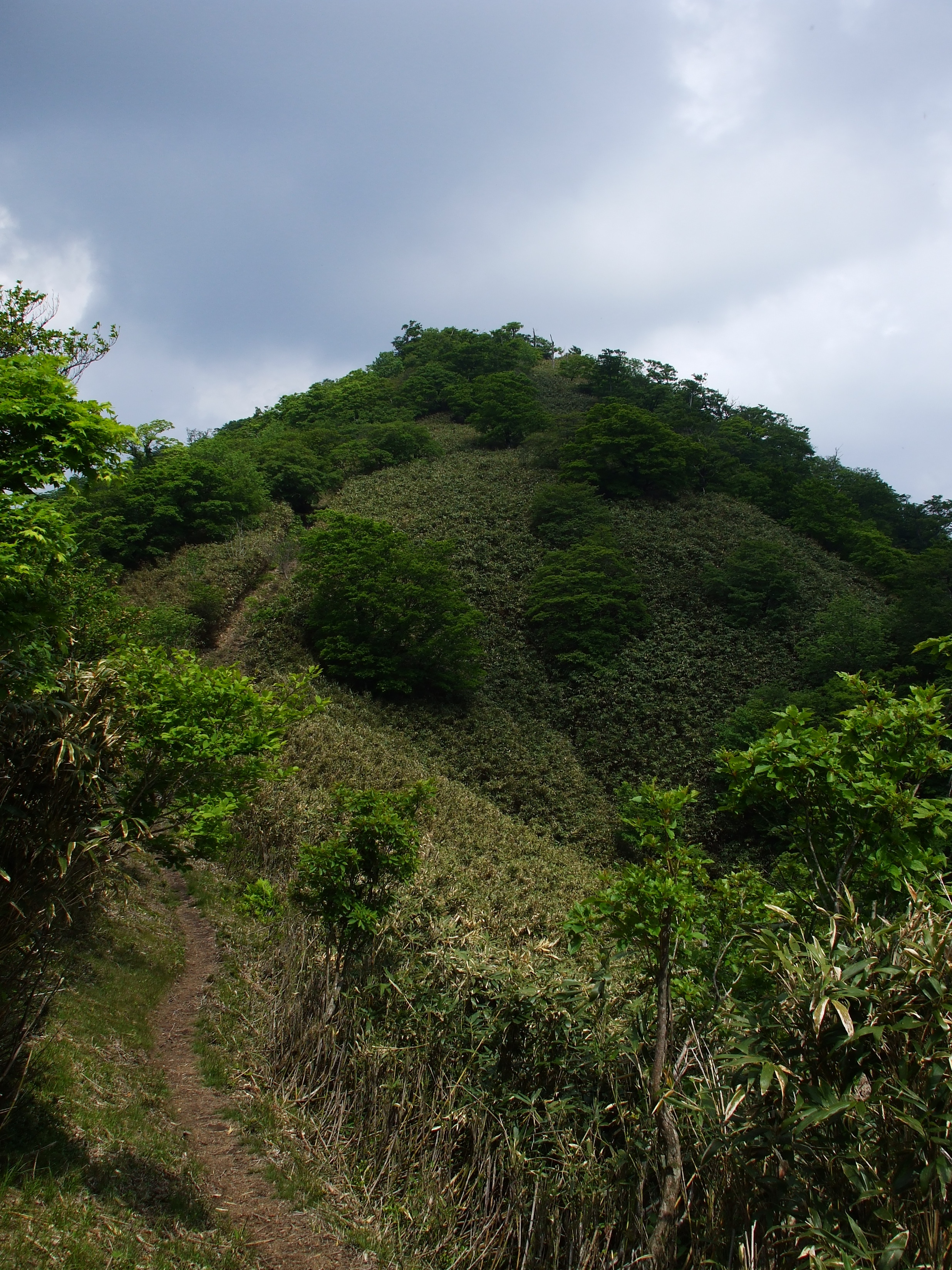
- A View of Mount Ushiro from Mount Funaki

Highest point
- Elevation: 1,344.6 m (4,411 ft)
- Coordinates: 35°11′N 134°24′E

Naming
- Language of name: Japanese
- Pronunciation: [ɯɕiɾojama]

Geography
- Location: On the border of Shiso, Hyōgo and Mimasaka, Okayama in Japan
- Parent range: Chūgoku Mountains

Geology
- Mountain type: Fault-block

Mount Ushiro (後山, Ushiro-yama) is a mountain on the border of Shisō, Hyōgo Prefecture, and Mimasaka, Okayama Prefecture, Japan. It is the highest mountain in Okayama Prefecture and the third highest mountain in Hyōgo Prefecture, after Mount Hyōno and Mount Mimuro. In Hyōgo Prefecture this mountain is also known as Itabami-san and in Tottori Prefecture it is also known as Ushiro-no-sen.

== Outline ==
Mount Ushiro is a fault-block mountain typical of the Chūgoku Mountains. This mountain belongs to the Hyōnosen-Ushiroyama-Nagisan Quasi-National Park. It is one of Hyōgo 50 mountains as well as one of Kinki 100 mountains and the Chūgoku 100 mountains.

== Religion and history ==
Mount Ushiro is a center of Shugendō in this region, and called Nishi-Omine, literally, West Omine. Omine is the name of the most important mountain for Shugendō in Japan. According to a local narration in this area{fact}, this mountain was developed as a training area by En no Gyōja, the founder of Shugendō in the 7th century, for Shugensha, practitioners of Shigendō. However, Dosen-ji, which is the center for the Shugendō on this mountain, was established in the 13th century, so it would be natural to understand Shugendō on this mountain also started about that time. Mount Ushiro is one of the mountains which still have some areas which women are prohibited to enter so as not to bother the training of Shugensha.
