= Mount Mimuro =

Mountain in Hyōgo and Tottori Prefecture, Japan

- 三室山
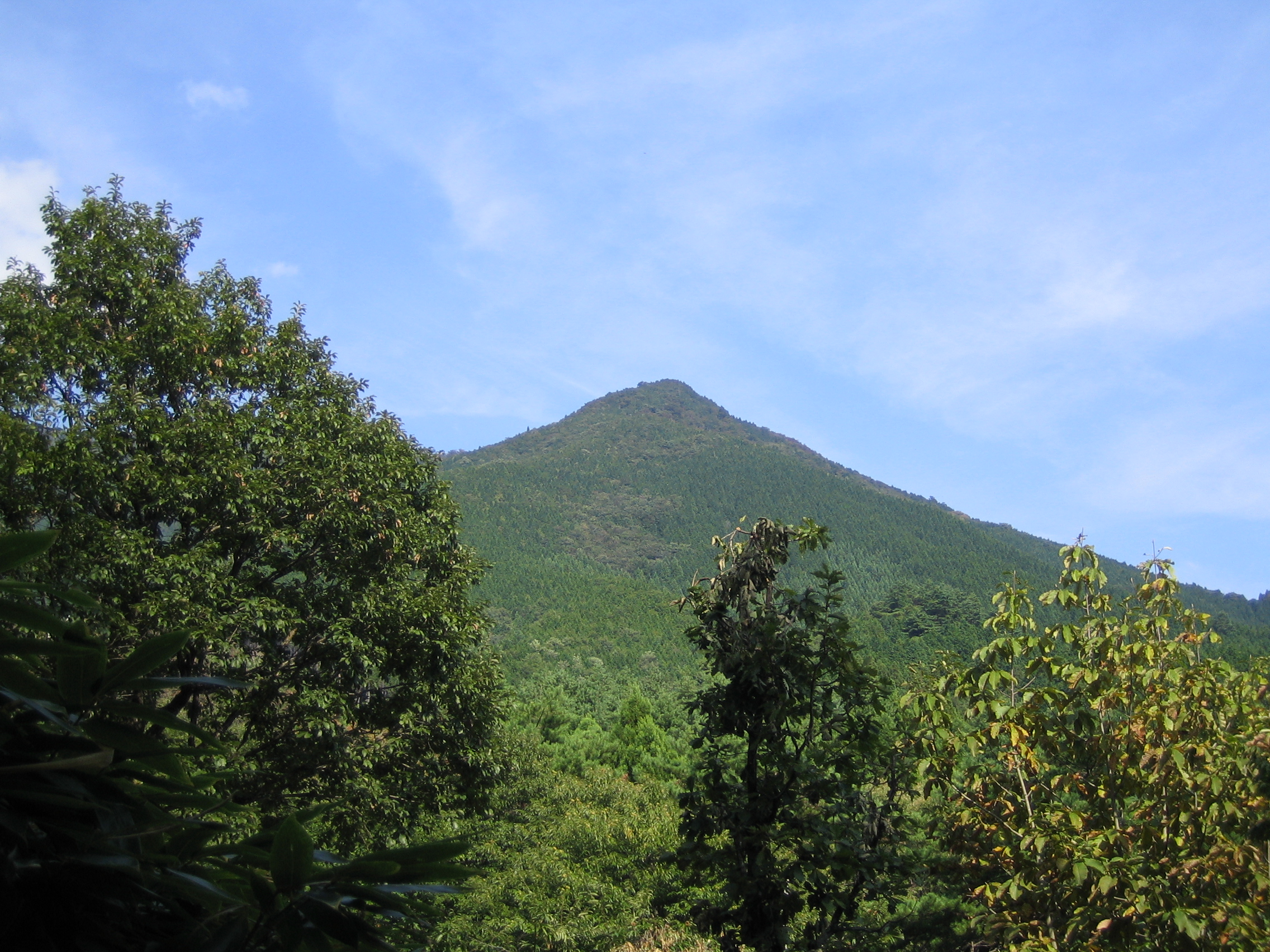
- A View of Mount Mimuro from south

Highest point
- Elevation: 1,358.0 m (4,455.4 ft)
- Coordinates: 35°14′N 134°27′E

Naming
- Language of name: Japanese
- Pronunciation: [mimɯɾojama]

Geography
- Location: On the border of Shisō, Hyōgo and Wakasa, Yazu Tottori in Japan
- Parent range: Chūgoku Mountains

Geology
- Mountain type: Fault-block

Mount Mimuro (三室山, Mimuro-yama) is a mountain on the border of Shisō, Hyōgo Prefecture, and Wakasa, Tottori Prefecture, Japan. The height is 1,358.0 m (4,455 ft), and this mountains is the second highest mountain in Hyōgo Prefecture after Mount Hyōno.

== Outline ==
Mount Mimuro is one of the fault-block of mountains typical in Chūgoku Mountains. This mountain belongs to the Hyōnosen-Ushiroyama-Nagisan Quasi-National Park. This mountain is one of Hyōgo 50 mountains, and also one of Kinki 100 mountains, Chūgoku 100 mountains.

== Access ==
- Kawachi Bus Stop of Shinki Bus

== Gallery ==
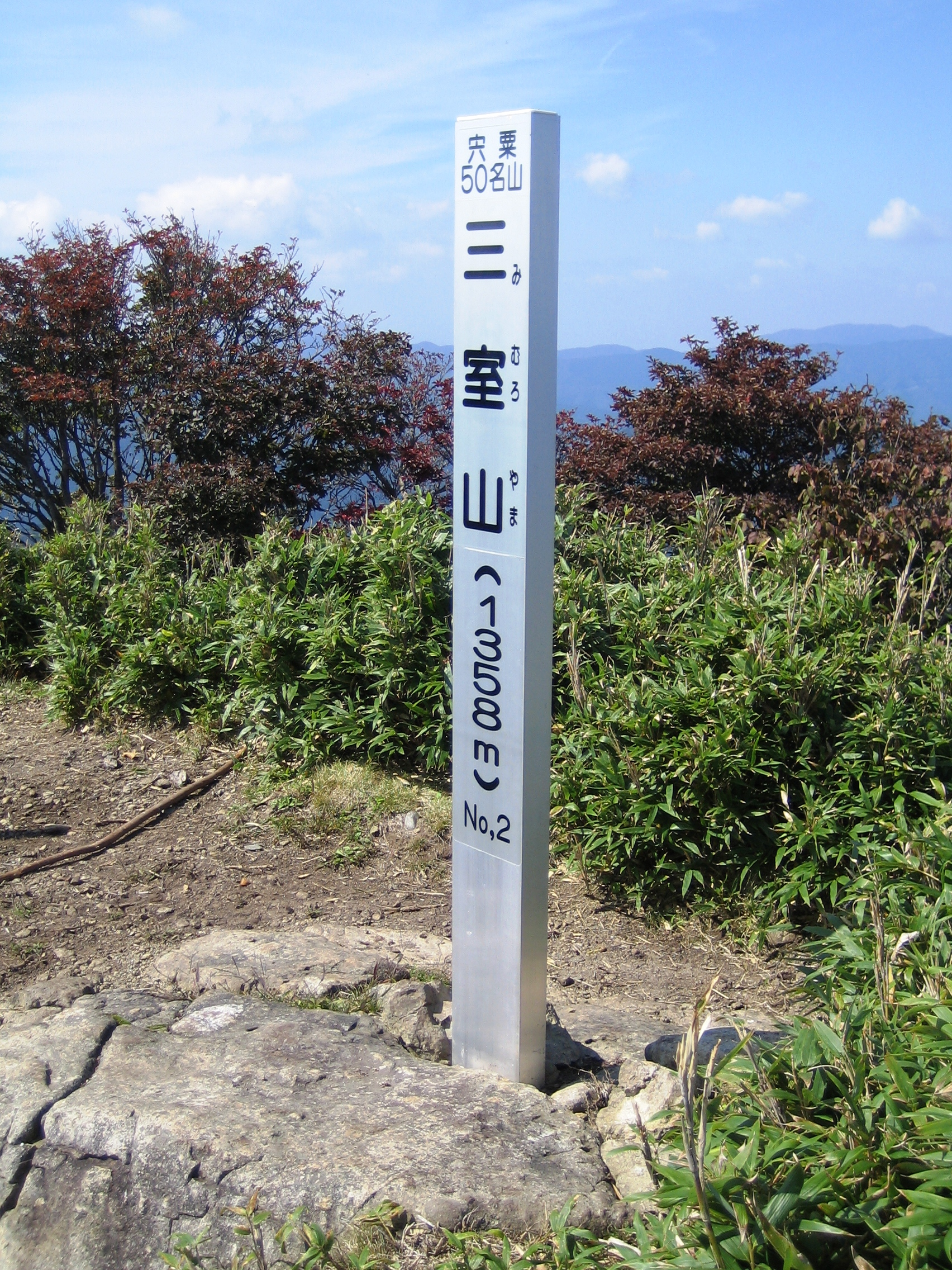
At the top of Mount Mimuro (10/2008)

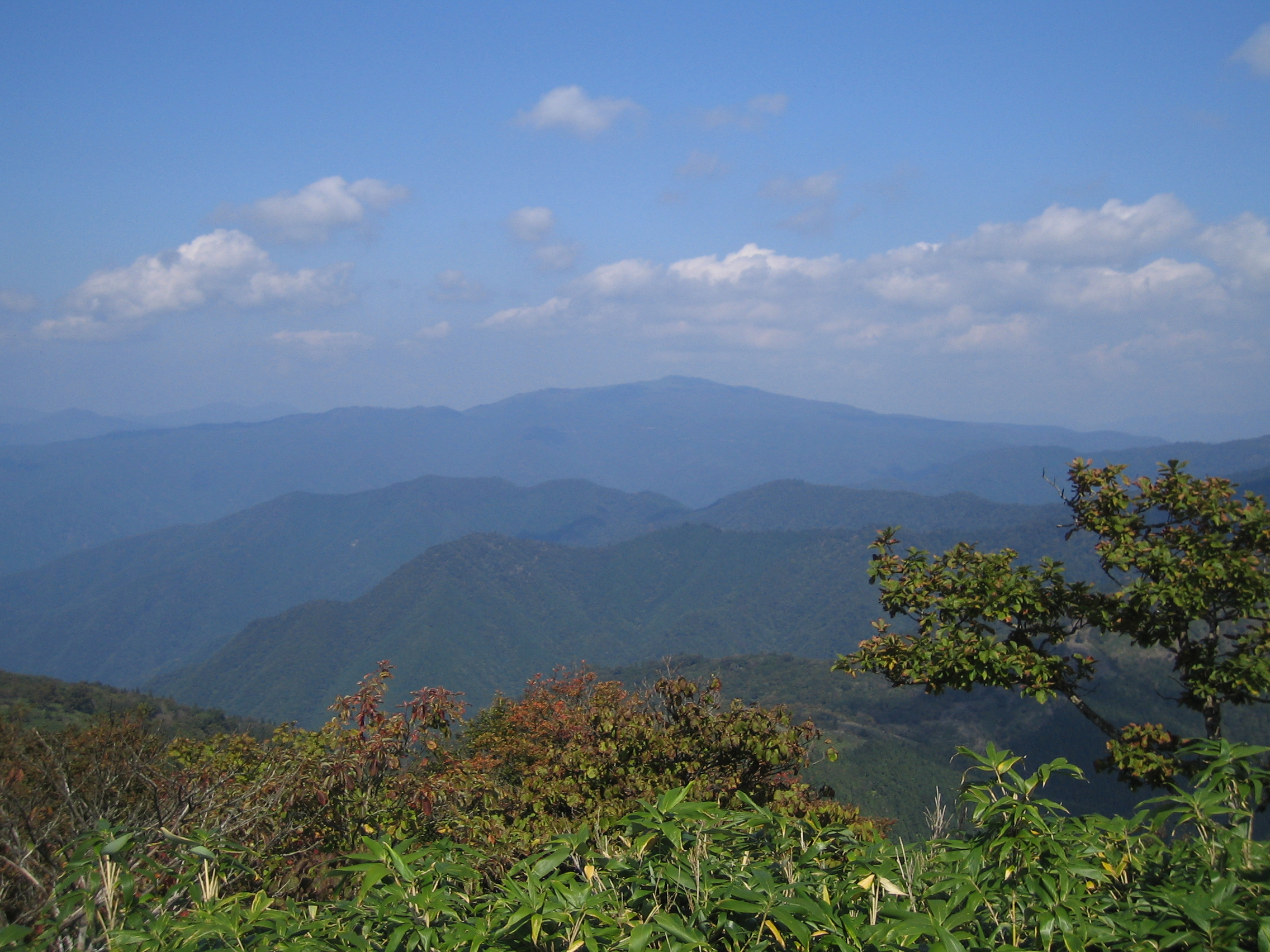
Mount Hyō from Mount Mimuro (10/2008)

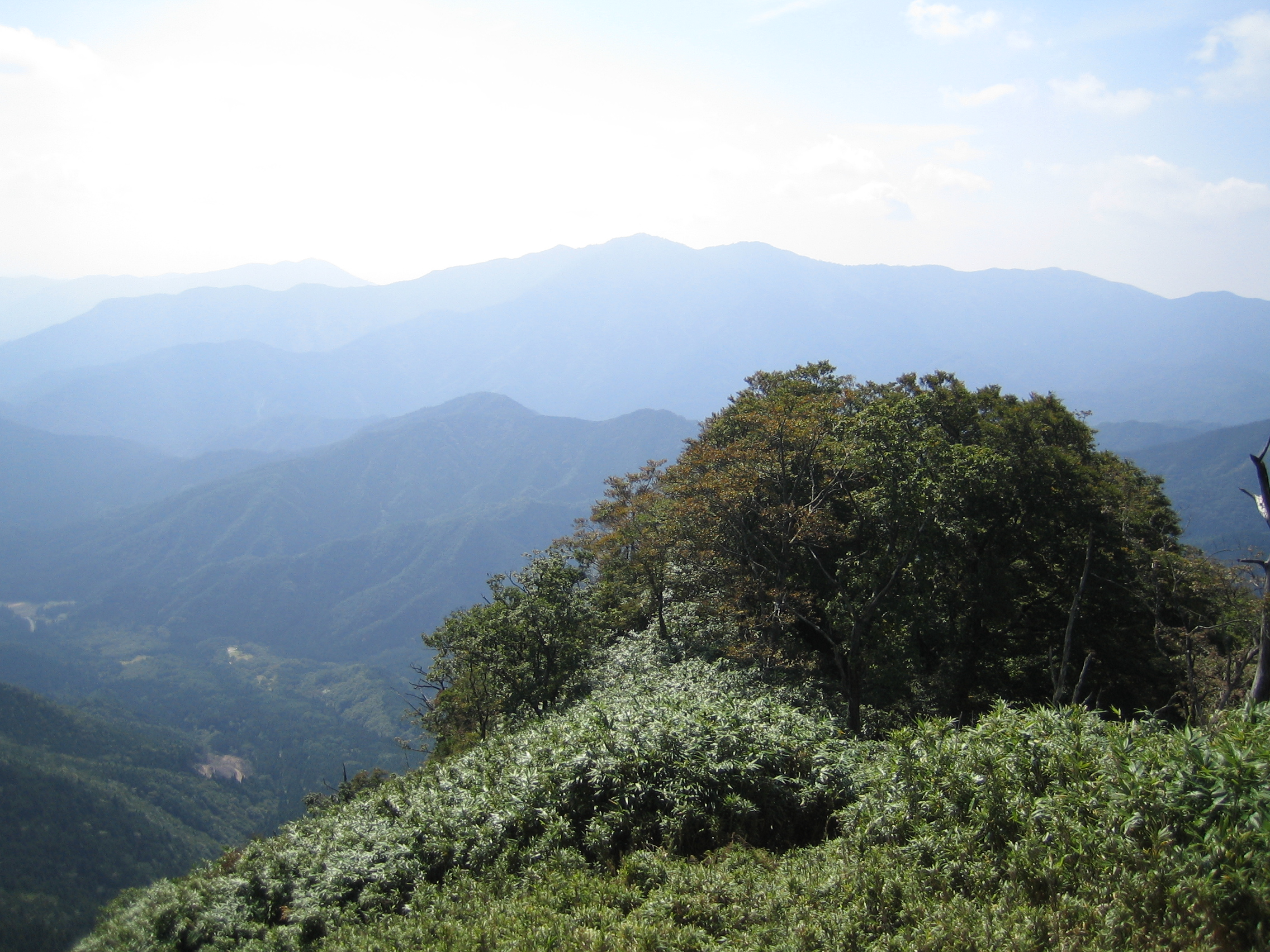
Mount Ushiro from Mount Mimuro (10/2008)

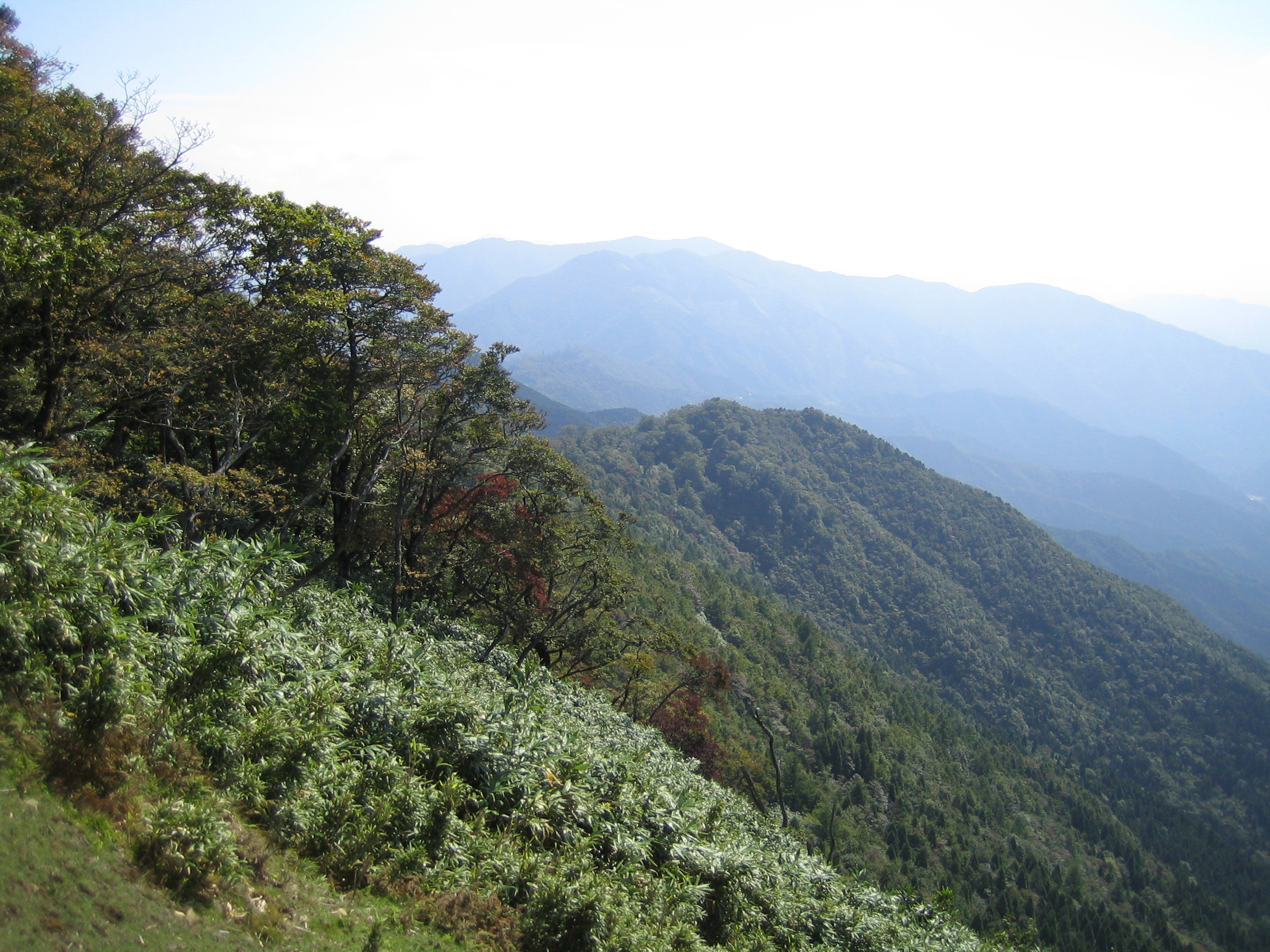
Mount Takero from Mount Mimuro (10/2008)
