= Hyōnosen-Ushiroyama-Nagisan Quasi-National Park =

- 氷ノ山後山那岐山国定公園
- IUCN category V (protected landscape/seascape)
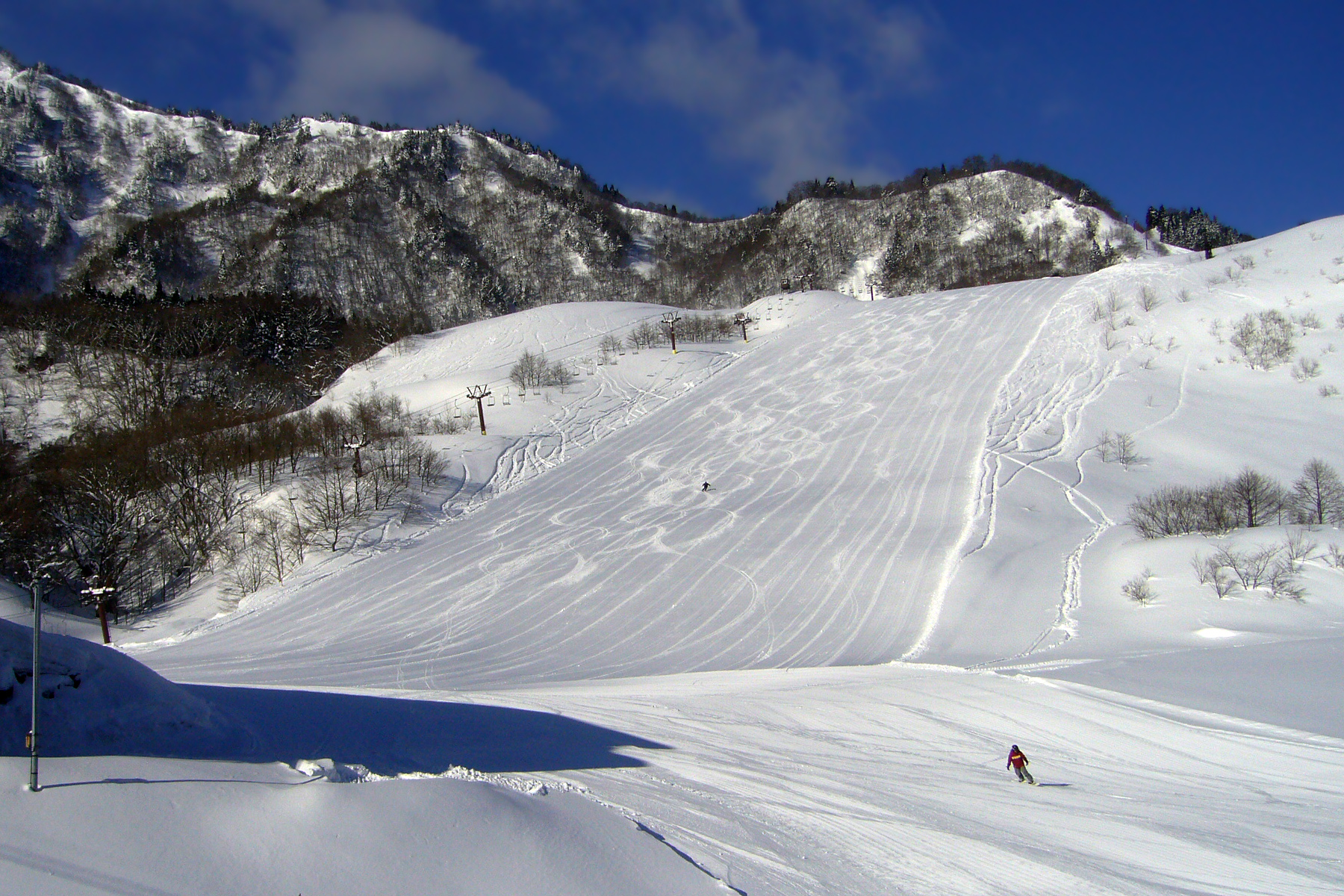
- Mount Hyōno

- Location within Japan
- Location: Kansai Region, Japan
- Nearest city: Toyooka, Hyōgo Prefecture
- Coordinates: 35°20′17″N 134°29′2″E
- Area: 488.03 square kilometres (188.43 mi^{2})
- Established: April 10, 1969
- Governing body: Hyōgo Prefecture, Tottori Prefecture, Okayama Prefecture

Hyōnosen-Ushiroyama-Nagisan Kokutei Kōen (氷ノ山後山那岐山国定公園) is a Quasi-National Park in Hyōgo Prefecture, Tottori Prefecture, and Okayama Prefecture, Japan. It was founded on 10 April 1969 and has an area of 488.03 square kilometres (188.43 mi^{2}).

== Overview ==
Hyōnosen-Ushiroyama-Nagisan Kokutei Kōen comprises three areas of the Chūgoku Mountains, a mountain range which forms the backbone of the Chūgoku region of western Japan and extends under the Pacific Ocean. The park covers 48,803 hectares (120,590 acres): 25,200 hectares (62,000 acres) in Hyōgo Prefecture, 15,024 hectares (37,130 acres) in Okayama Prefecture, and 8,579 hectares (21,200 acres) in Tottori Prefecture.

=== Jurisdictions ===
- Hyōgo Prefecture
  - Toyooka
  - Yabu
  - Shisō
  - Kami
  - Shin'onsen
  - Sayō
- Okayama Prefecture
  - Mimasaka
  - Nishiawakura
- Tottori Prefecture
  - City of Tottori
  - Iwami
  - Yazu
  - Wakasa
  - Chizu
  - Misasa

== Mountains ==
Important mountains of the park include:

- Mount Hyōno -- 1,510 metres (4,950 ft). Hyōgo and Tottori prefectures
- Mount Sobu -- 1,074 metres (3,524 ft). Hyōgo Prefecture
- Mount Mimuro -- 1,358 metres (4,455 ft). Hyōgo and Tottori prefectures
- Mount Ushiro -- 1,345 metres (4,413 ft). Hyōgo and Okayama prefectures
- Mount Nagi -- 1,255 metres (4,117 ft). Tottori and Okayama prefectures

== See also ==
- List of national parks of Japan
