= Chūgoku Mountains =

Mountain range in Chūgoku, Japan

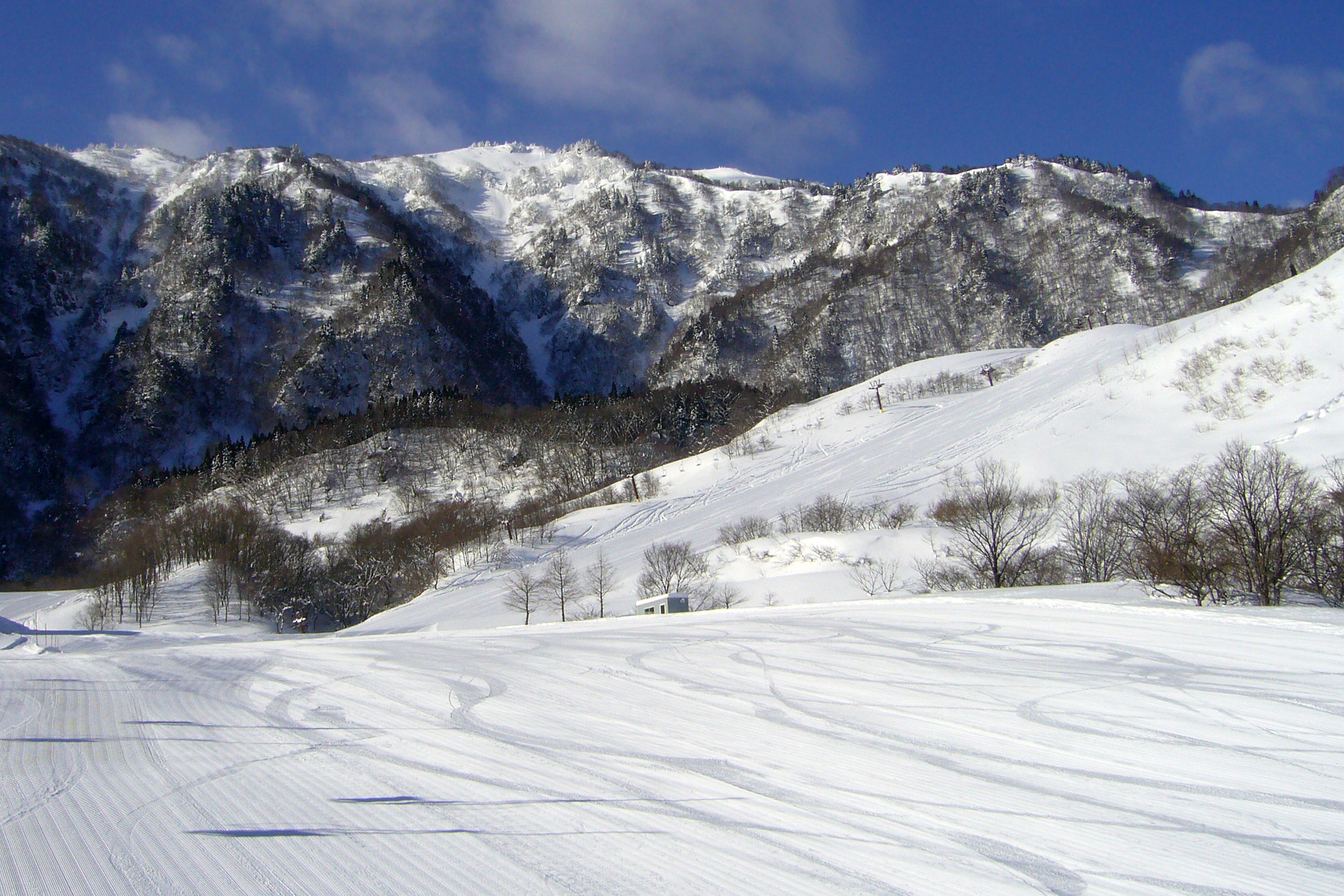
- Mount Hyōno

Highest point
- Peak: Daisen, Tottori Prefecture
- Elevation: 1,729 m (5,673 ft)
- Coordinates: 35°22′16″N 133°32′47″E

Naming
- Etymology: central country
- Native name: 中国山地 (Japanese); Chūgoku Sanchi (Japanese)

Geography
- Country: Japan
- Prefectures: Hyōgo, Hiroshima, Okayama, Shimane, Tottori and Yamaguchi
- Region: Chūgoku

Chūgoku Mountains (中国山地, Chūgoku Sanchi) is a mountain range in the Chūgoku region of western Japan. It runs in an east–west direction and stretches approximately 500 km (311 mi) from Hyōgo Prefecture in the east to the coast of Yamaguchi Prefecture. The range also reaches under the Pacific Ocean.

The two tallest mountains in the group are Daisen and Mount Hyōno, which are 1,729 m (5,673 ft) and 1,510 m (4,954 ft), respectively. Many other mountains in the range are also over 1,000 m (3,281 ft), while some of the smaller mountains are less than 500 m (1,640 ft). Granite is the most common stone found among the mountains, much of which has been exposed through erosion.

== Geography ==
Other than Daisen, most of the mountains run along the border of Tottori and Okayama prefectures and the border of Shimane and Hiroshima prefectures. The mountains form a drainage divide and natural barrier in western Japan between the San'in Region to the north and the San'yō Region to the south.

== Major mountains ==
- Mount Daisen (大山), 1,729 m (5,673 ft)
- Mount Hyōno (氷ノ山), 1,510 m (4,954 ft)
- Mount Mimuro (三室山), 1,358 m (4,455 ft)
- Mount Osorakan (恐羅漢山), 1,346 m (4,416 ft)
- Mount Ushiro (後山), 1,345 m (4,413 ft)
- Mount Kanmuri (冠山), 1,339 m (4,393 ft)
- Mount Jakuchi (寂地山), 1,337 m (4,386 ft)
- Mount Ōgi (扇ノ山), 1,310 m (4,298 ft)
- Mount Dōgo (道後山), 1,268 m (4,160 ft)
- Mount Hiba (比婆山), 1,264 m (4,147 ft)
- Mount Nagi (那岐山), 1,255 m (4,117 ft)
- Mount Hiru (蒜山), 1,199 m (3,934 ft)
- Mount Sentsū (船通山), 1,142 m (3,747 ft)
- Mount Myōken (妙見山), 1,136 m (3,727 ft)
- Mount Sambe (三瓶山), 1,126 m (3,694 ft)
- Mount Ōsa (大佐山), 1,069 m (3,507 ft)
- Mount Sen (千ヶ峰), 1,005 m (3,297 ft)
- Mount Hōbutsu (宝仏山), 1,005 m (3,297 ft)
- Mount Seppiko (雪彦山), 915 m (3,002 ft)
- Mount Aono (青野山), 907 m (2,976 ft)
- Mount Misumi (三角山), 516 m (1,693 ft)
- Mount Haku (白山), 510 m (1,673 ft)

== Rivers ==
The Chūgoku Mountains are the source of several rivers in western Japan. All flow either north to the Japan Sea or south to the Inland Sea with the exception of the Gōnokawa River (206 kilometres (128 mi)), which runs along the mountain range in Hiroshima and Shimane prefectures.

The Sendai River (52 kilometres (32 mi)), the Tenjin River (32 kilometres (20 mi)), the Hino River (77 kilometres (48 mi)), and the Kando River (82 kilometres (51 mi)) all run steeply from the Chūgoku Mountains to the Japan Sea. The Yoshii River (83 kilometres (52 mi)), the Asahi River (88 kilometres (55 mi)), and the Ōta River (655 kilometres (407 mi)) form a broader alluvial plain to the south of the mountain range and empty in to the Inland Sea.

== Economy ==
The Chūgoku Mountains are a source of iron sand, and the region was home to some of the earliest production of ironware in Japan. The broad tablelands of the mountain region support cattle ranches, notably for the production of wagyu beef. The numerous rivers of the Chūgoku Mountains support an extensive network of rice production in western Japan.
