= Mount Hyōno =

Mountain in Hyōgo Prefecture, Japan

- 氷ノ山
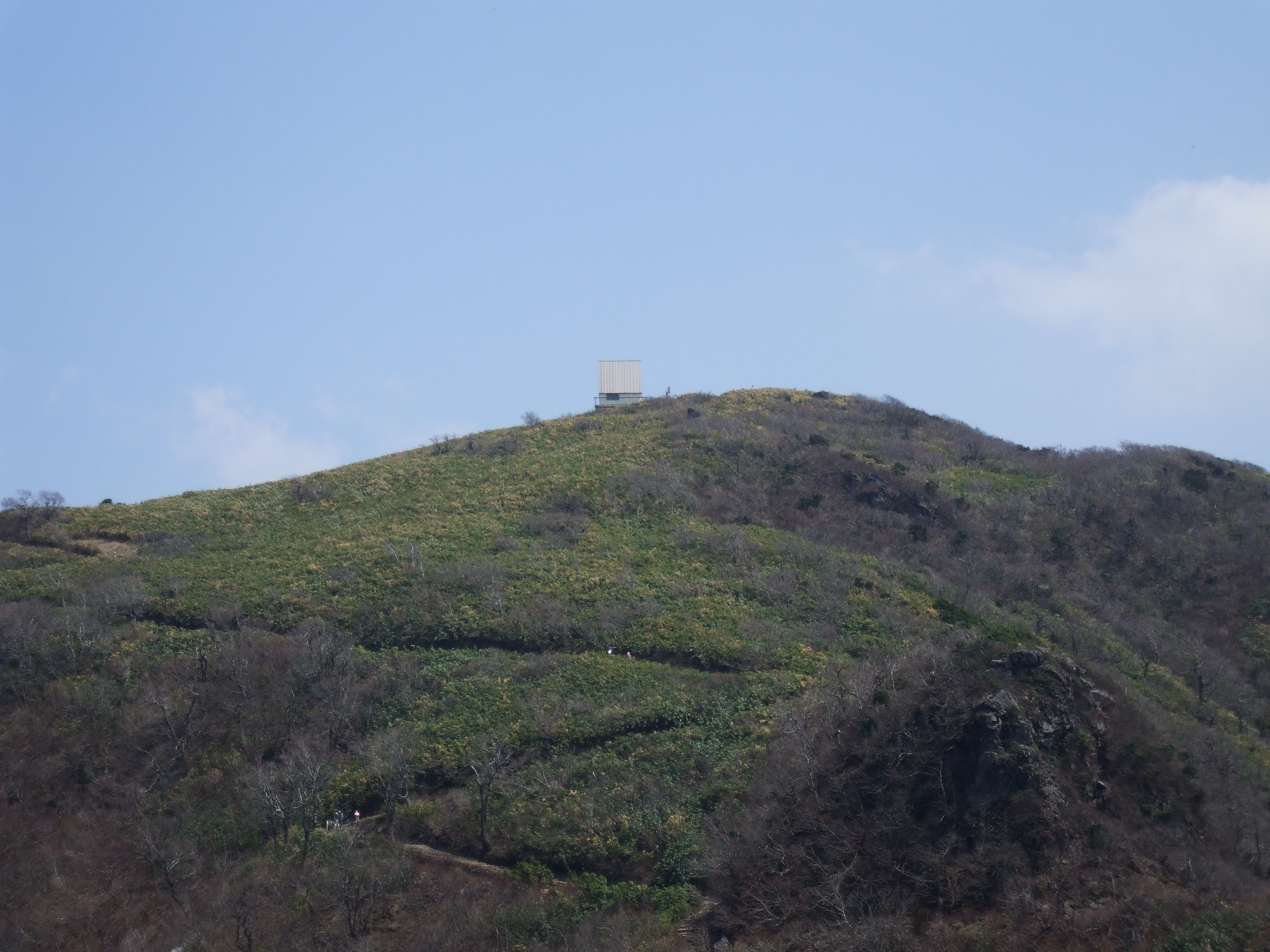
- A View of Mt. Hyōno

Highest point
- Elevation: 1,509.6 m (4,953 ft)
- Prominence: 1,002 m (3,287 ft)
- Listing: Ribu, Mountains of Japan
- Coordinates: 35°21′14″N 134°30′49″E

Naming
- Language of name: Japanese
- Pronunciation: [çjoːnoseɴ]

Geography
- Location within Hyōgo Prefecture Location within Tottori Prefecture Location within Japan
- Country: Japan
- Prefectures: Hyōgo and Tottori
- City/Town: Yabu and Wakasa
- Parent range: Chūgoku Mountains

Geology
- Mountain type: Upheaved submarine volcano

Mount Hyōno (氷ノ山, Hyō-no-sen) is a mountain on the border of Yabu, Hyōgo Prefecture, and Wakasa, Tottori Prefecture, in Japan. It is the highest mountain in Hyōgo Prefecture. This mountain is one of the 200 famous mountains in Japan. Other names of this mountain are Suga-no-sen, Hyō-zan, Hyō-no-yama, Kōri-no-yama.

== Outline ==
Mount Hyōno is estimated as an upheaved submarine volcano which erupted three million years ago with Mount Naki and Torokawa-daira highland. This mountain is the second highest mountain in Chūgoku Mountains, and also the second highest in Honshū west of Osaka Prefecture. This mountain is in the Hyōnosen-Ushiroyama-Nagisan Quasi-National Park. This mountain is also selected as one of the 100 untrodden areas in Japan.

== Access ==
- Fukusada Bus Stop of Zentan Bus.

== Gallery ==
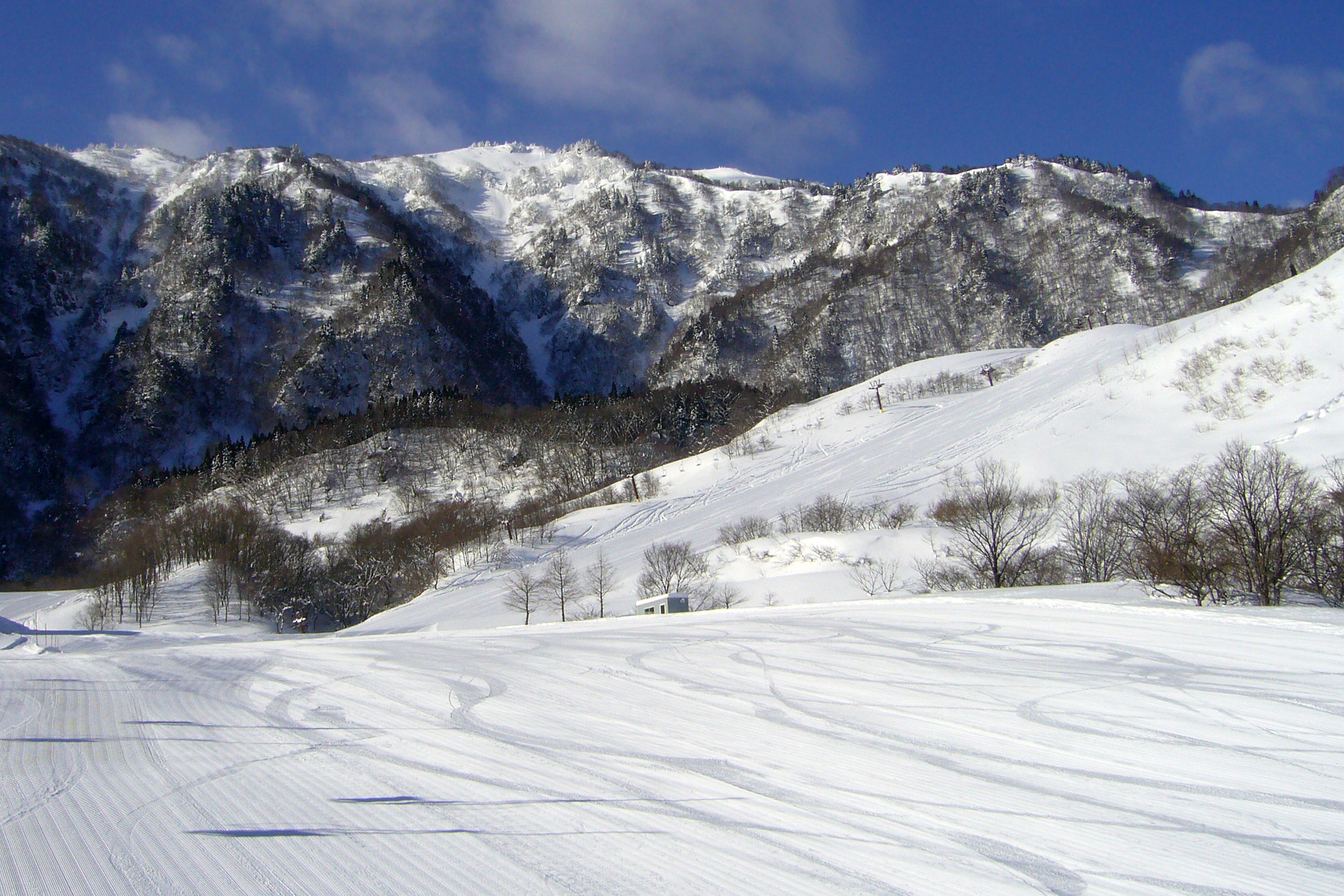
Mount Hyōno from northeast

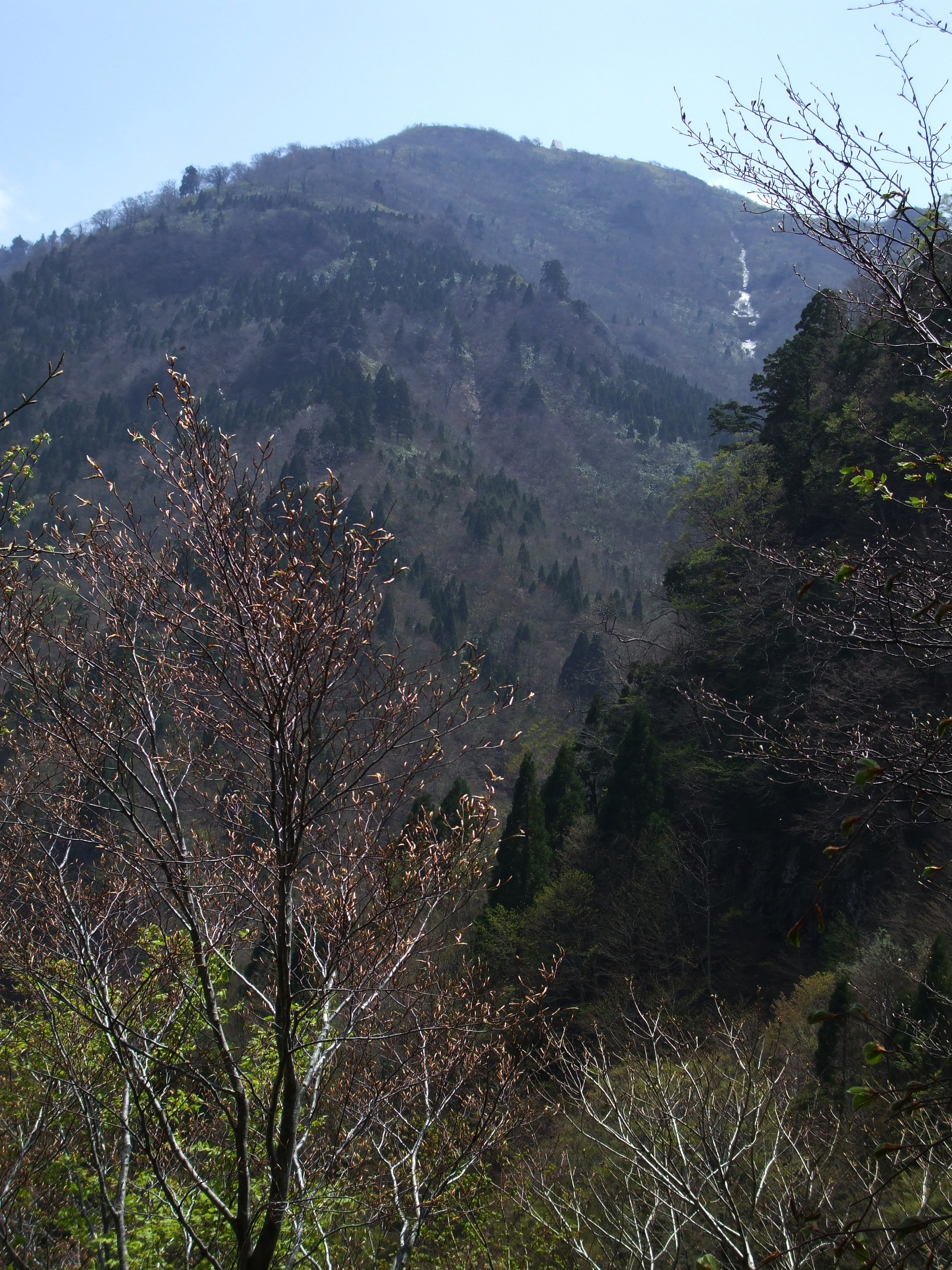
Mount Hyōno from north

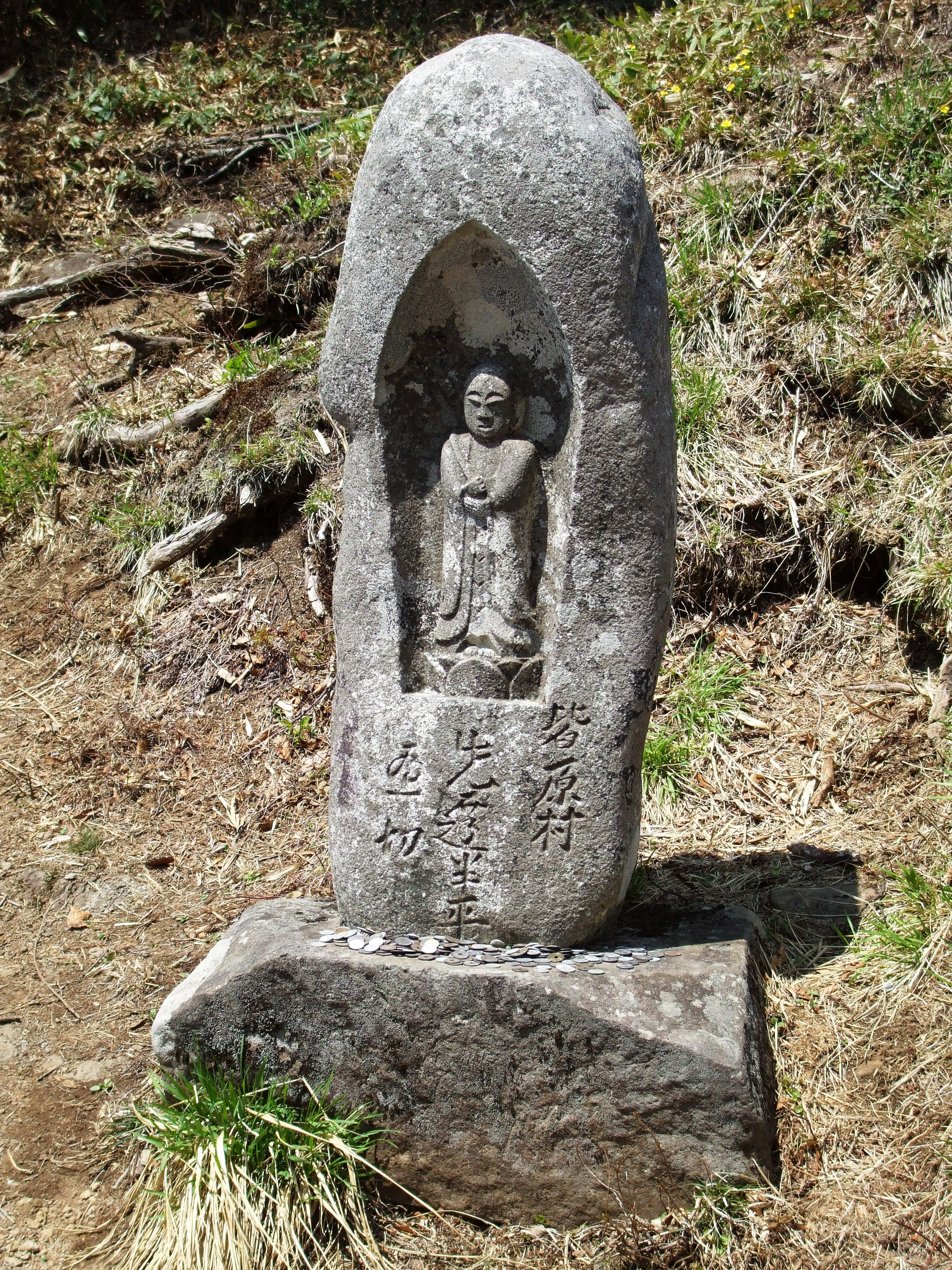
A religious object in Mount Hyōno

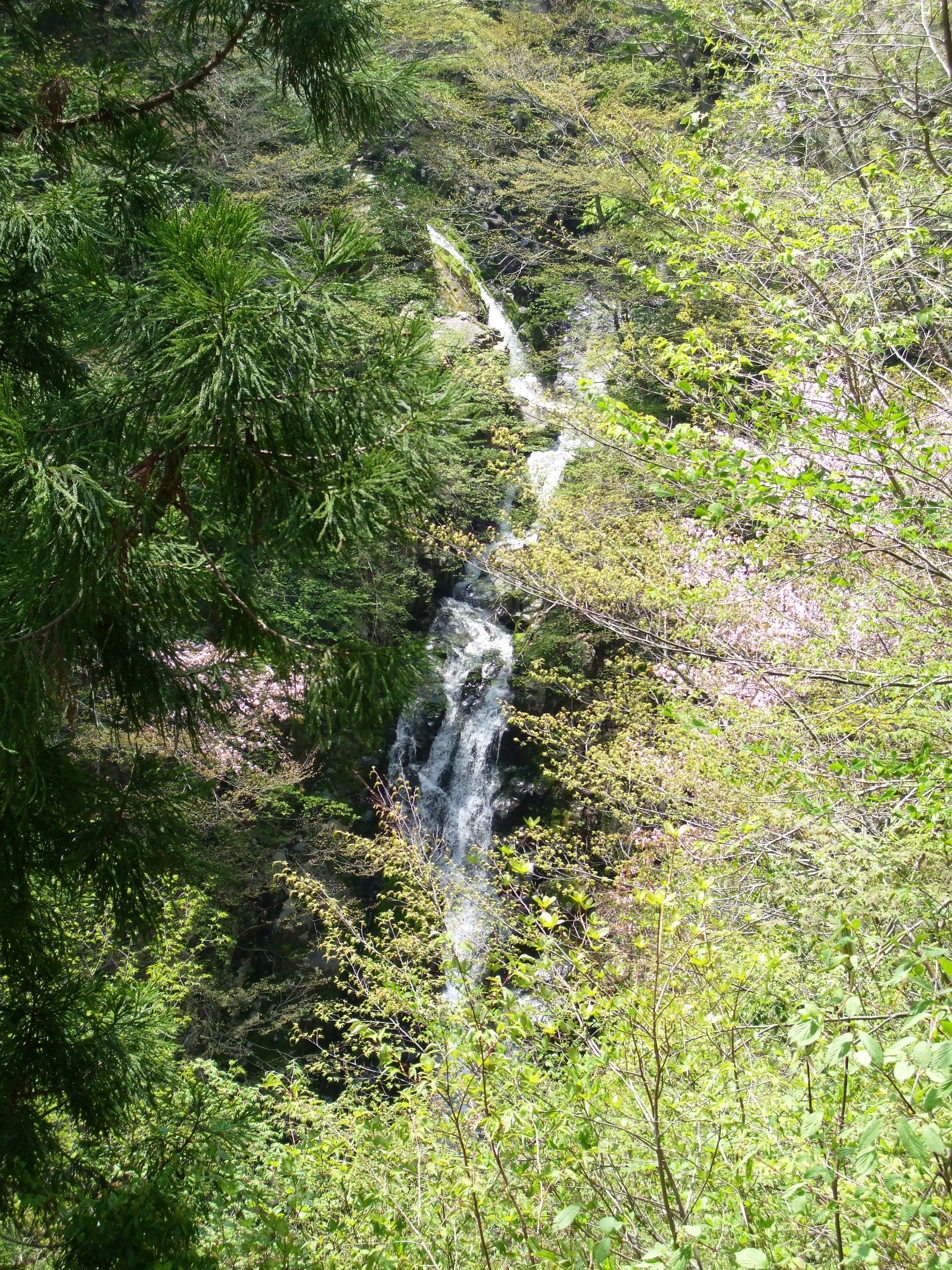
Fudo Waterfall in Mount Hyōno

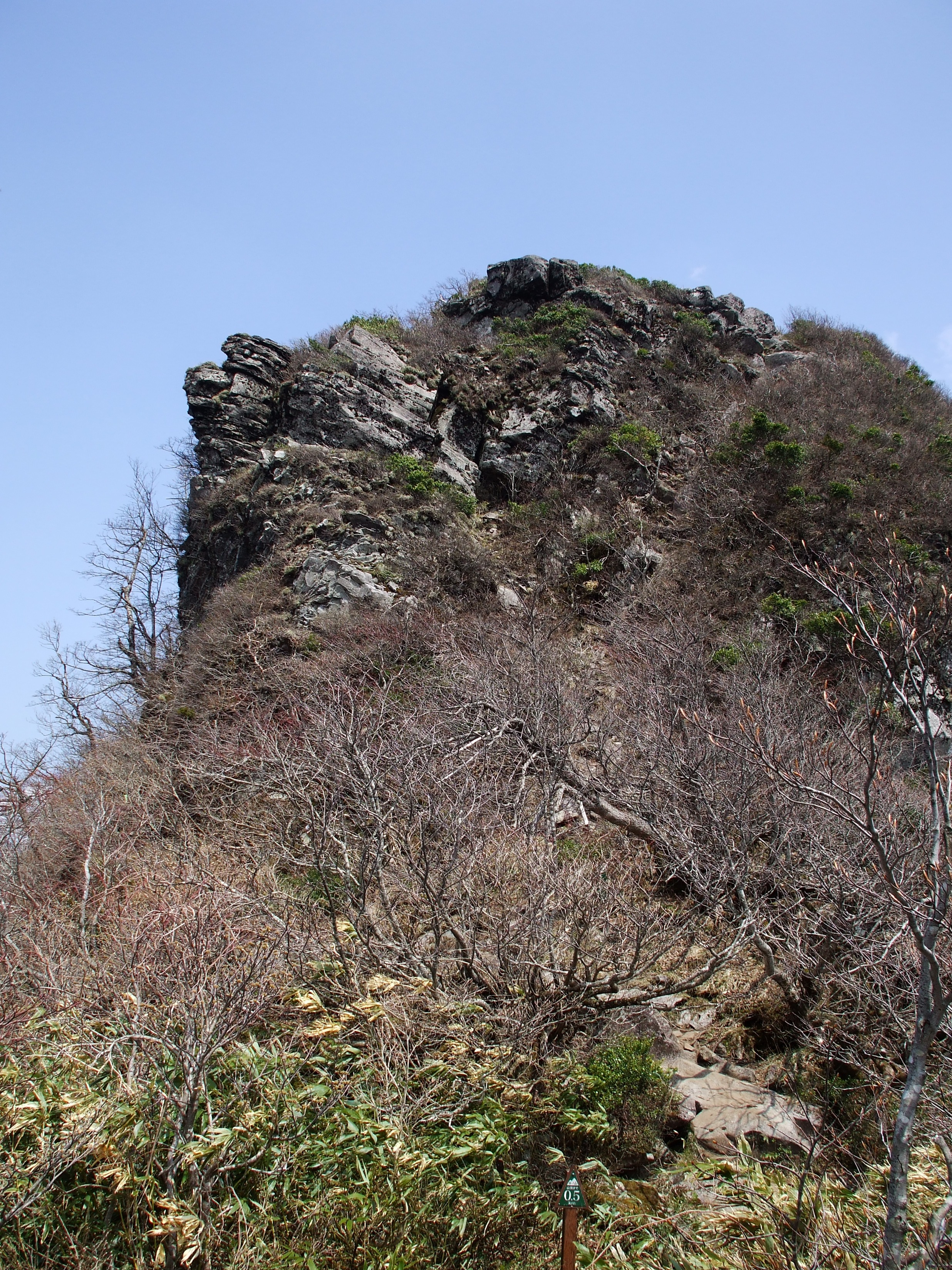
A rock on the route to the top of Mount Hyōno from northMount Tanigawa from south

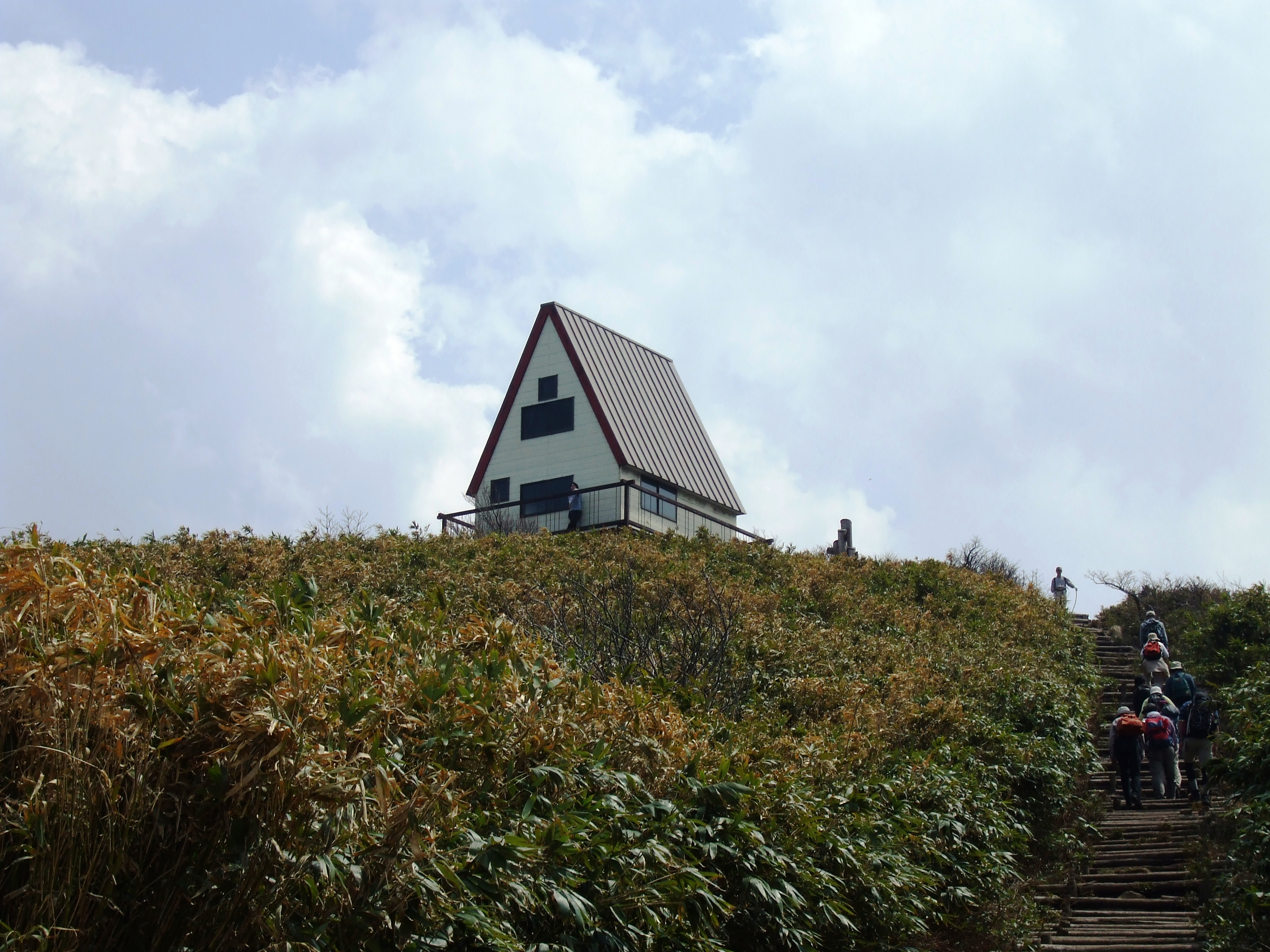
The top of Mount Hyōno from north

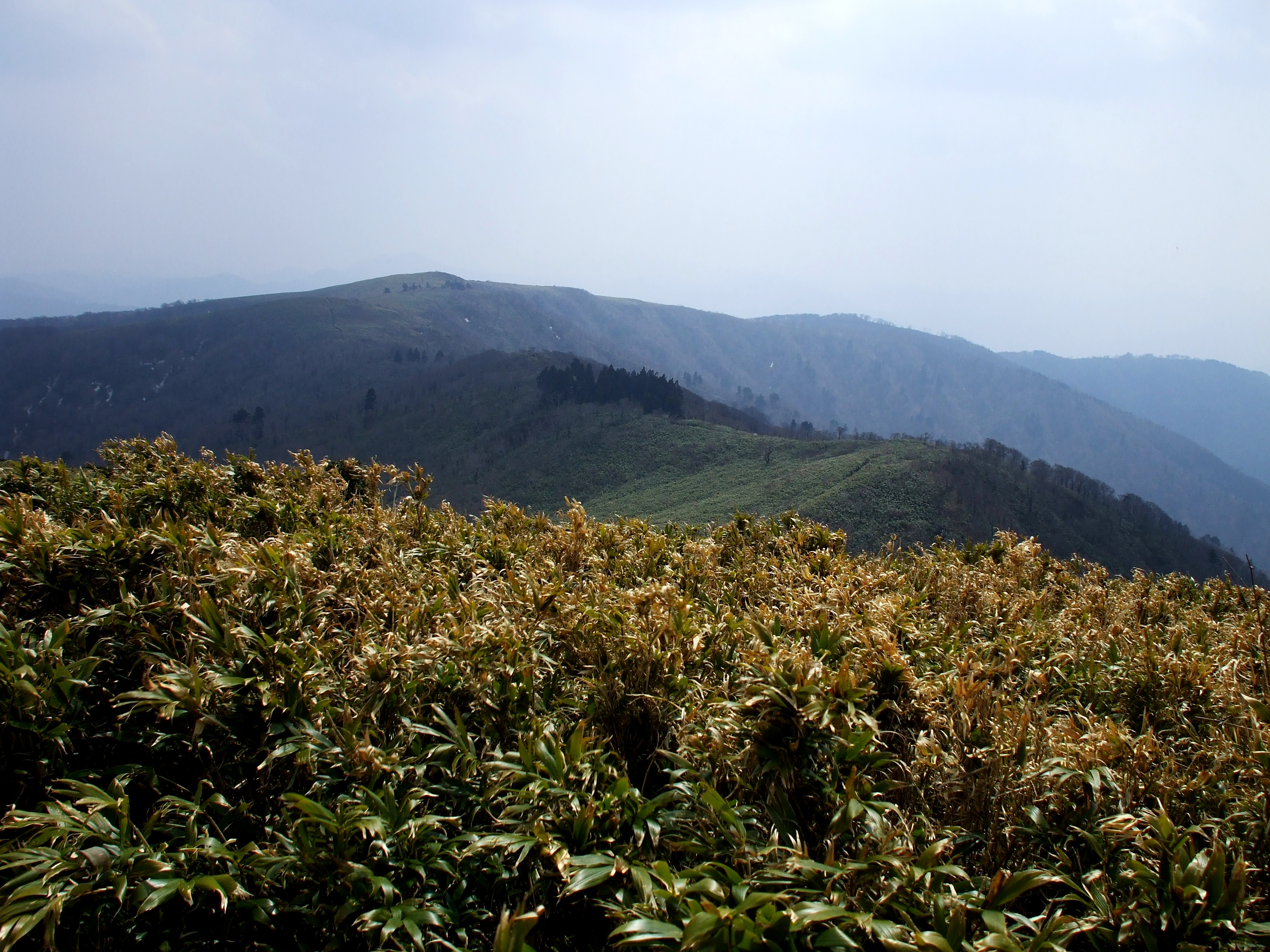
Southside view from the top of Mount Hyōno

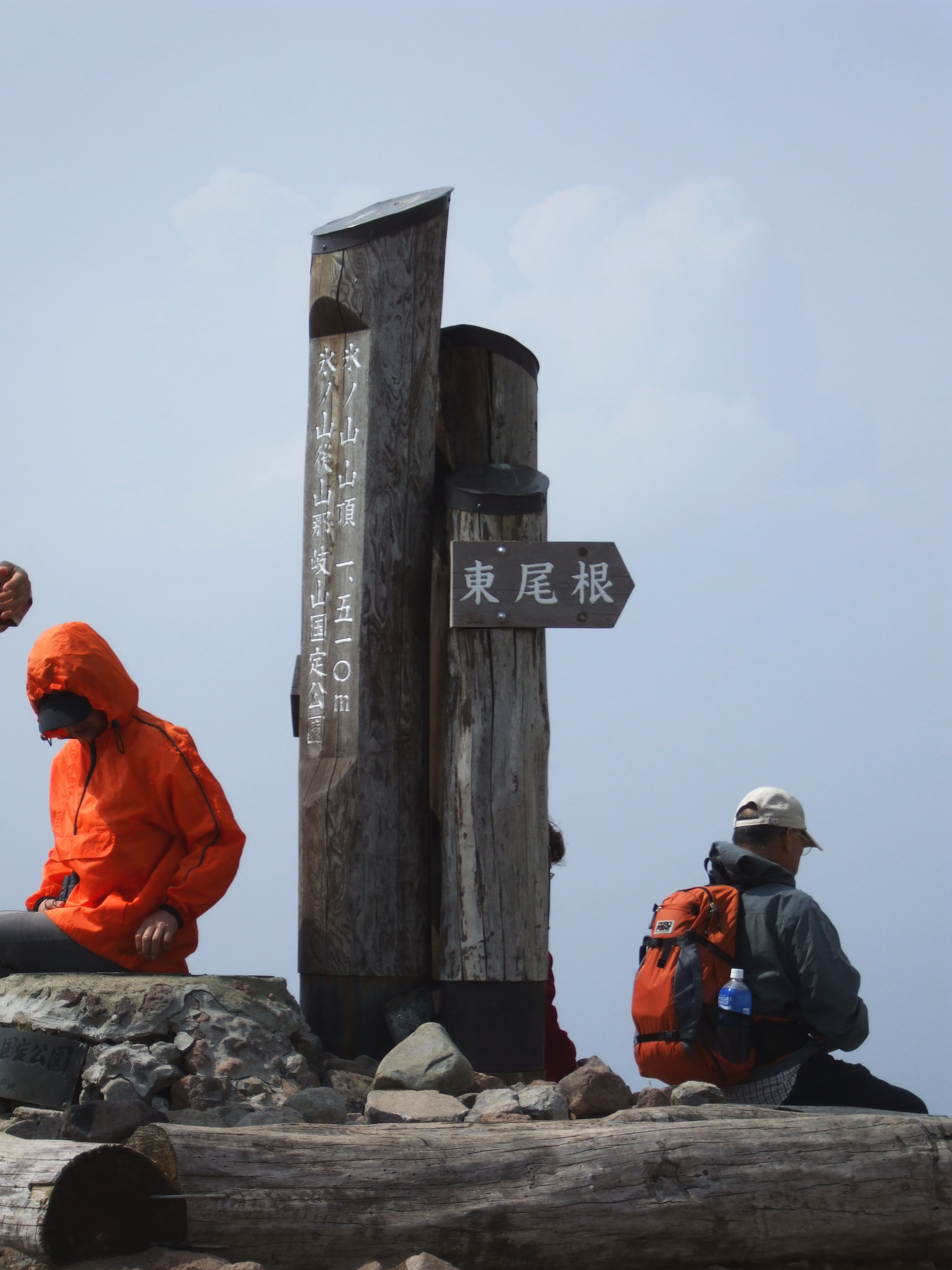
The top of Mount Hyōno

== See also ==
- The 100 Views of Nature in Kansai
