= Hayabusa Station =

Railway station in Yazu, Tottori Prefecture, Japan

Hayabusa Station 隼駅
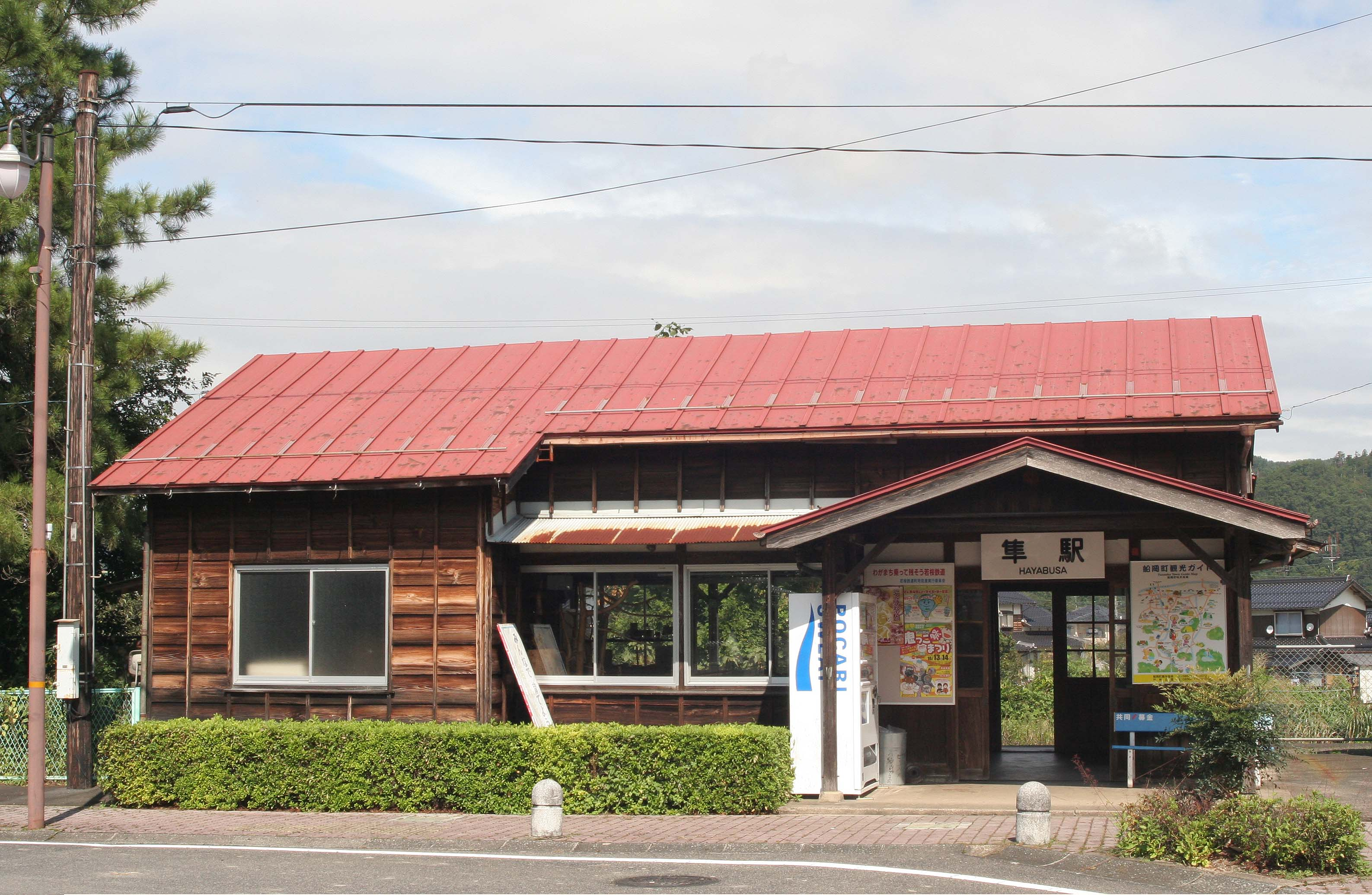
- Hayabusa Station, October 2007

General information
- Location: Fukui, Yazu-cho, Yazu-gun, Tottori-ken 680-0403; Japan
- Coordinates: 35°23′19.5″N 134°16′12″E
- Operator: Wakasa Railway
- Line: ■ Wakasa Line
- Distance: 4.4 km (2.7 miles) from Kōge
- Platforms: 1 side platform
- Connections: Bus stop

Other information
- Status: Unstaffed

History
- Opened: 20 January 1930

Passengers
- FY2018: 45 daily
Location
- Location within Tottori Prefecture Location within Japan

Hayabusa Station (隼駅, Hayabusa-eki) is a railway station on the Wakasa Railway Wakasa Line in Yazu, Tottori, Japan, operated by the third sector company Wakasa Railway.

== Lines ==
Hayabusa Station is served by the 19.2 km Wakasa Line between Kōge and Wakasa, and is located 4.4 km from Kōge. Only local trains stop at this station.

== Station layout ==
The station consists of one ground-level side platform serving a single bi-directional track. This station building and platform were built in 1929 and were registered as Tangible Cultural Property in 2008.

== Adjacent stations ==
«	Service	»
Wakasa Line
Inaba-Funaoka	-	Abe

== History ==
Hayabusa Station opened on 20 January 1930.

== Passenger statistics ==
In fiscal 2018, the station was used by an average of 45 passengers daily.

== Surrounding area ==
- Japan National Route 482
- Yazu Town Hayabusa Elementary School

== See also ==
- List of railway stations in Japan
