= Hattō Station =

Railway station in Yazu, Tottori Prefecture, Japan

Hattō Station 八東駅
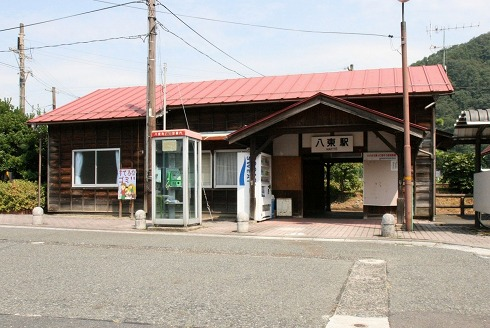
- Hattō Station

General information
- Location: Saitai, Yazu-cho, Yazu-gun, Tottori-ken 680-0531; Japan
- Coordinates: 35°21′48.75″N 134°19′0.02″E
- Operator: Wakasa Railway
- Line: ■ Wakasa Line
- Distance: 9.8 km (6.1 miles) from Kōge
- Platforms: 1 side platform
- Connections: Bus stop

Other information
- Status: Staffed

History
- Opened: 1 December 1930

Passengers
- FY2018: 60 daily
Location
- Location within Tottori Prefecture Location within Japan

Hattō Station (八東駅, Hattō-eki) is a passenger railway station located in the town of Yazu, Yazu District, Tottori Prefecture, Japan. It is operated by the third sector company Wakasa Railway.

== Lines ==
Hattō Station is served by the Wakasa Line, and is located 9.8 kilometers from the terminus of the line at Kōge. Only local trains stop at this station.

== Station layout ==
The station consists of two ground-level opposed side platforms connected to the wooden station building by a level crossing. This station building was built in 1930 and was registered as Tangible Cultural Property in 2008.

== Adjacent stations ==
«	Service	»
Wakasa Railway
Wakasa Line
Abe	-	Tokumaru

== History ==
Hattō Station opened on December 1, 1930.

== Passenger statistics ==
In fiscal 2018, the station was used by an average of 60 passengers daily.

== Surrounding area ==
- Yazu Town Hatto Elementary School
- Japan National Route 29
- Japan National Route 482

== See also ==
- List of railway stations in Japan
