= Inabafunaoka Station =

Railway station in Yazu, Tottori Prefecture, Japan

Inabafunaoka Station 因幡船岡駅
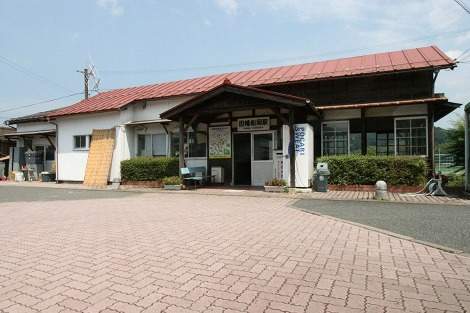
- Inabafunaoka Station, 2008

General information
- Location: Funaoka, Yazu-cho, Yazu-gun, Tottori-ken 680-0471; Japan
- Coordinates: 35°23′42.28″N 134°14′57.43″E
- Operator: Wakasa Railway
- Line: ■ Wakasa Line
- Distance: 2.4 km (1.5 miles) from Kōge
- Platforms: 1 side platform
- Connections: Bus stop

Other information
- Status: Staffed

History
- Opened: 1 October 1996

Passengers
- FY2018: 35 daily
Location
- Location within Tottori Prefecture Location within Japan

Inabafunaoka Station (因幡船岡駅, Inabafunaoka-eki) is a passenger railway station located in the town of Yazu, Yazu District, Tottori Prefecture, Japan. It is operated by the third sector company Wakasa Railway.

== Lines ==
Inabafunaoka Station is served by the Wakasa Line, and is located 2.4 kilometers from the terminus of the line at Kōge. Only local trains stop at this station.

== Station layout ==
The station consists of one ground-level side platform serving a single bi-directional track. The wooden station building is on the south side of the tracks. This station building and platform were built in 1929 and were registered as Tangible Cultural Property in 2008.

== Adjacent stations ==
| « | Service | » |
Wakasa Railway
Wakasa Line
| Yazukōkōmae | - | Hayabusa |

== History ==
Inabafunaoka Station opened on January 20, 1930.

== Passenger statistics ==
In fiscal 2018, the station was used by an average of 35 passengers daily.

== Surrounding area ==
- Yazu Town Hall Funaoka Office
- Yazu Town Funaoka Elementary School

== See also ==
- List of railway stations in Japan
