= Tampi Station =

Railway station in Yazu, Tottori Prefecture, Japan

Tampi Station 丹比駅
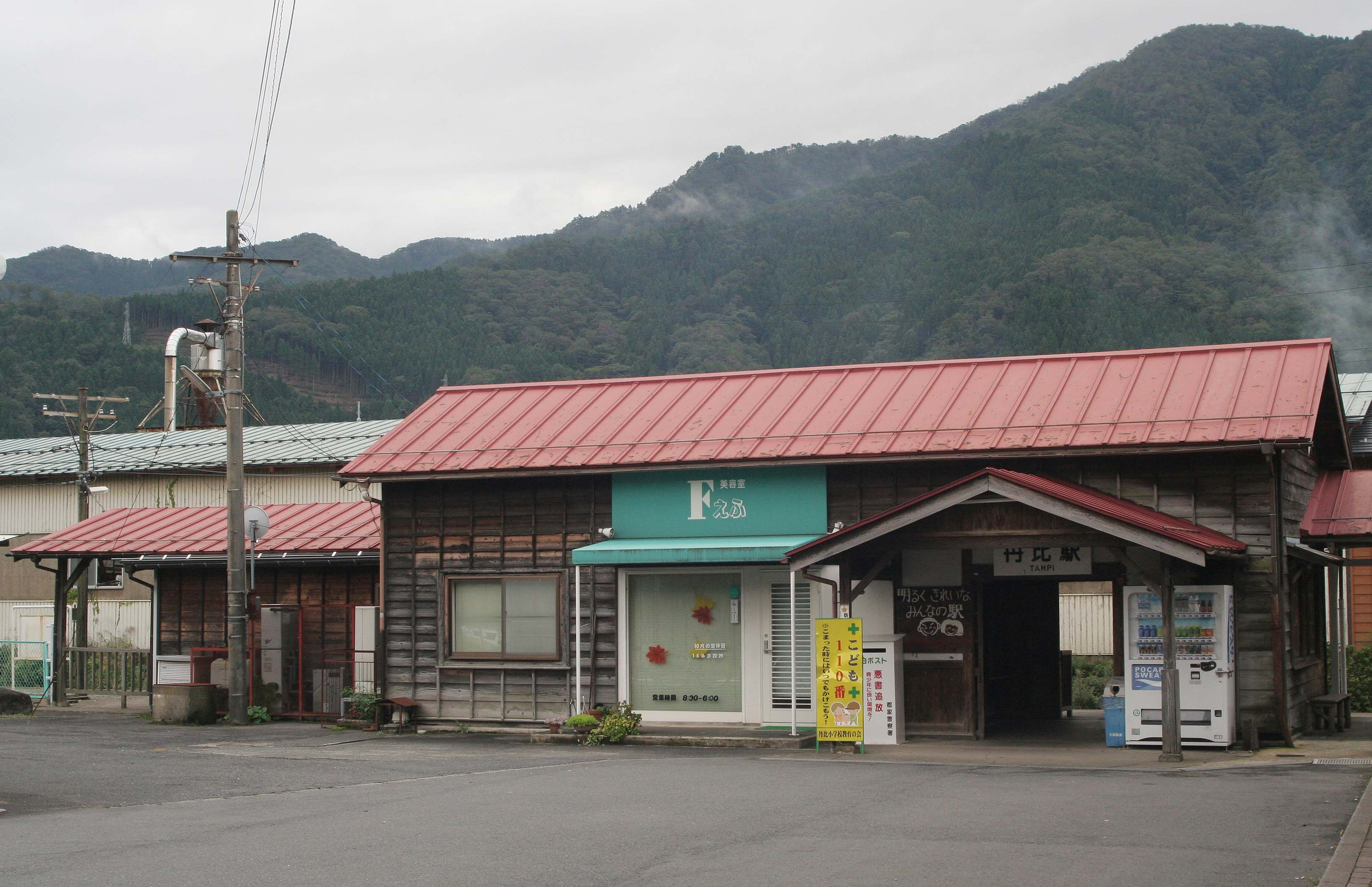
- Tampi Station

General information
- Location: Kitayama, Yazu-cho, Yazu-gun, Tottori-ken 680-0601; Japan
- Coordinates: 35°21′38.76″N 134°21′21.84″E
- Operator: Wakasa Railway
- Line: ■ Wakasa Line
- Distance: 13.5 km (8.4 miles) from Kōge
- Platforms: 1 side platform
- Connections: Bus stop

Other information
- Status: Staffed

History
- Opened: 1 December 1930

Passengers
- FY2018: 102 daily
Location
- Location within Tottori Prefecture Location within Japan

Tampi Station (丹比駅, Tampi-eki) is a passenger railway station located in the town of Yazu, Yazu District, Tottori Prefecture, Japan. It is operated by the third sector company Wakasa Railway.

== Lines ==
Tampi Station is served by the Wakasa Line, and is located 13.5 kilometers from the terminus of the line at Kōge. Only local trains stop at this station.

== Station layout ==
The station consists of one ground-level side platform serving a single bi-directional track. The wooden station building is integrated with a beauty shop, and ticket sales are outsourced to the same shop, and the owner of the beauty shop also serves as the station manager. This station building and platform were built in 1930 and were registered as Tangible Cultural Property in 2008.

== Adjacent stations ==
| « | Service | » |
Wakasa Railway
Wakasa Line
| Tokumaru | - | Wakasa |

== History ==
Tampi Station opened on December 1, 1930.

== Passenger statistics ==
In fiscal 2018, the station was used by an average of 102 passengers daily.

== Surrounding area ==
- Yazu Town Hall Hatto Government Building
- Yazu Municipal Hatto Junior High School
- Yazu Town Tanpi Elementary School

== See also ==
- List of railway stations in Japan
