= Tokumaru =

Tokumaru (written: 徳丸 or トクマル in katakana) is a Japanese surname. Notable people with the surname include:

- Kan Tokumaru (徳丸 完, 1941–2011), Japanese voice actor
- Shugo Tokumaru (トクマル シューゴ, born 1980), Japanese musician

== See also ==
- Tokumaru Station, a railway station in Yazu, Tottori Prefecture, Japan
