= Yazu =

Yazu 八頭町
- Town
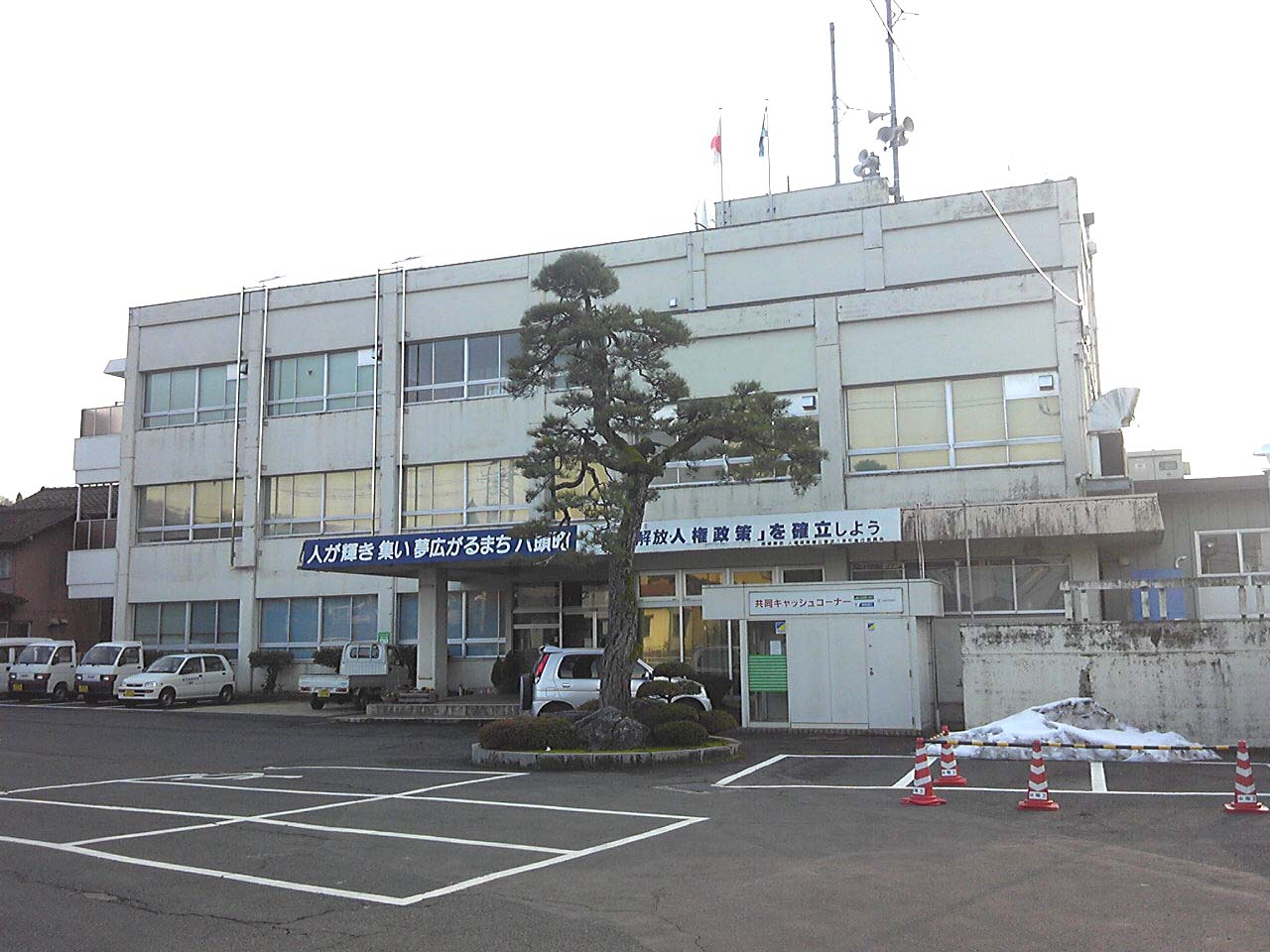
- Yazu Town Hall

- Flag Seal
- Location of Yazu in Tottori Prefecture

- Coordinates: 35°24′N 134°15′E
- Country: Japan
- Region: Chūgoku
- Prefecture: Tottori Prefecture
- District: Yazu

Area
  - Total: 206.71 km^{2} (79.81 sq mi)

Population (November 30, 2022)
  - Total: 16,156
  - Density: 78.158/km^{2} (202.43/sq mi)
- Time zone: UTC+9 (JST)
- Symbols
  - Tree: Diospyros kaki
  - Flower: Rhododendron indicum
- Phone number: 0858-76-0201
- Address: 493 Kōge, Yazu-chō, Yazu-gun, Tottori-ken 680-0493
- Website: Official website

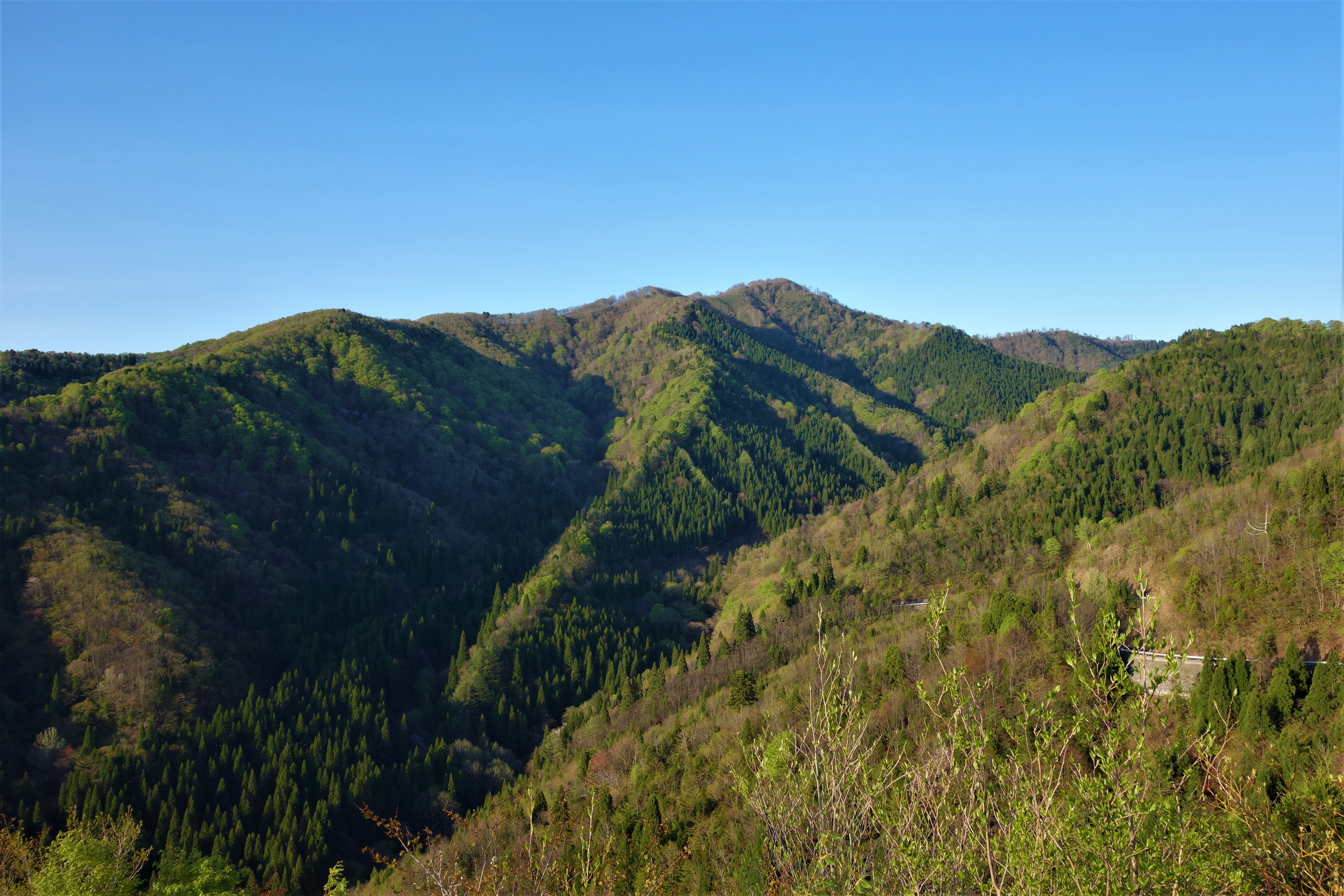
Oginosen Mountains

Yazu (八頭町, Yazu-chō) is a town located in Yazu District, Tottori Prefecture, Japan. As of 30 November 2022, the town had an estimated population of 16,156 in 6140 households and a population density of 78 persons per km^{2}. The total area of the town is 206.71 square kilometres (79.81 sq mi).

== Geography ==
Yazu is located to the far east of Tottori Prefecture. Its highest peak is Ōginosen (1,309.9 metres or 4,298 feet), which is located on the border of the city of Tottori, the towns of Misasa and Chizu, as well as Shin'onsen in Hyōgo Prefecture. Ōginosen is part of the Daisen Volcanic Belt. The mountain is part of Hyōnosen-Ushiroyama-Nagisan Quasi-National Park, and has facilities for skiing and camping. The Hattō River (39.1 metres (128 ft)), the largest tributary of the Sendai River, flows through Yazu, as does a smaller tributary, the Kisaichi River (28.1 metres (92 ft)), which traces its origin to Ōginosen.

=== Neighbouring municipalities ===
Tottori Prefecture

- Chizu
- Tottori
- Wakasa

== Climate ==
Yazu has a humid subtropical climate (Köppen Cfa) characterized by warm summers and cool winters with moderate snowfall. The average annual temperature in Yazu is 13.3 °C. The average annual rainfall is 1851 mm with September as the wettest month. The temperatures are highest on average in January, at around 21.5 °C, and lowest in January, at around 2.1 °C.

== Demography ==
Per Japanese census data, the population of Yazu has been as follows:

Historical population
Year	Pop.	±%
1920	22,088	—
1930	23,220	+5.1%
1940	22,208	−4.4%
1950	20,519	−7.6%
1960	26,658	+29.9%
1970	25,562	−4.1%
1980	22,142	−13.4%
1990	21,091	−4.7%
2000	20,245	−4.0%
2010	18,428	−9.0%

== History ==
The area of Yazu was part of ancient Inaba Province, and is the setting of the Hare of Inaba legend. During the Edo period, the area was part of the holdings of Tottori Domain ruled by a branch of the Ikeda clan from their seat at Tottori Castle. Yazu District, Tottori was established after the Meiji restoration and divided into several villages with the creation of the modern municipalities system on April 1, 1896. The town of Yazu was formed on March 31, 2005, by the merger of the towns of Funaoka, Hattō and Kōge, all from Yazu District.

== Government ==
Yazu has a mayor-council form of government with a directly elected mayor and a unicameral town council of 18 members headed by a chairperson and vice-chairperson. Yazu, collectively with the other municipalities of Yazu District, contributes two members to the Tottori Prefectural Assembly. In terms of national politics, the town is part of Tottori 1st district of the lower house of the Diet of Japan.

== Education ==
Yazu has four public elementary schools and one junior high school operated by the town government, and one public high school operated by the Tottori Prefectural Board of Education.

== Transportation ==
=== Railway ===
JR West - Inbi Line

- Higashi-Kōge - Kōge -Kawahara

Wakasa Railway - Wakasa Line

- Kōge - Yazukōkōmae - Inabafunaoka - Hayabusa - Abe - Hattō - Tokumaru - Tampi

=== Highways ===
- National Route 29
- National Route 482

== Sister cities ==
- Hoengseong County, Gangwon, Republic of Korea, friendship city since 1996
- Da'an, Jilin, China, friendship city since 1996

== Local attractions ==
- Hyōnosen-Ushiroyama-Nagisan Quasi-National Park, founded on April 10, 1969, spans across Hyōgo Prefecture, Tottori Prefecture, and Okayama Prefecture. Much of the area of the town of Yazu is included in the quasi-national park.

== Notable people from Iwami ==
- Shigeru Ishiba, politician
