= Koge (disambiguation) =

Køge is a seaport town in Denmark.

Koge may also refer to:

- Kogé, Benin
- Kōge, Fukuoka, Japan
- Kōge, Tottori, a former town in Japan

== See also ==
- Køge Municipality, the second-level Danish administrative division which contains the town of Køge
- Koge station (disambiguation)
