= Wakasa Oniga Castle =

Castle ruins in Tottori, Japan

- 若桜鬼ヶ城
- Wakasa, Tottori Prefecture, Japan
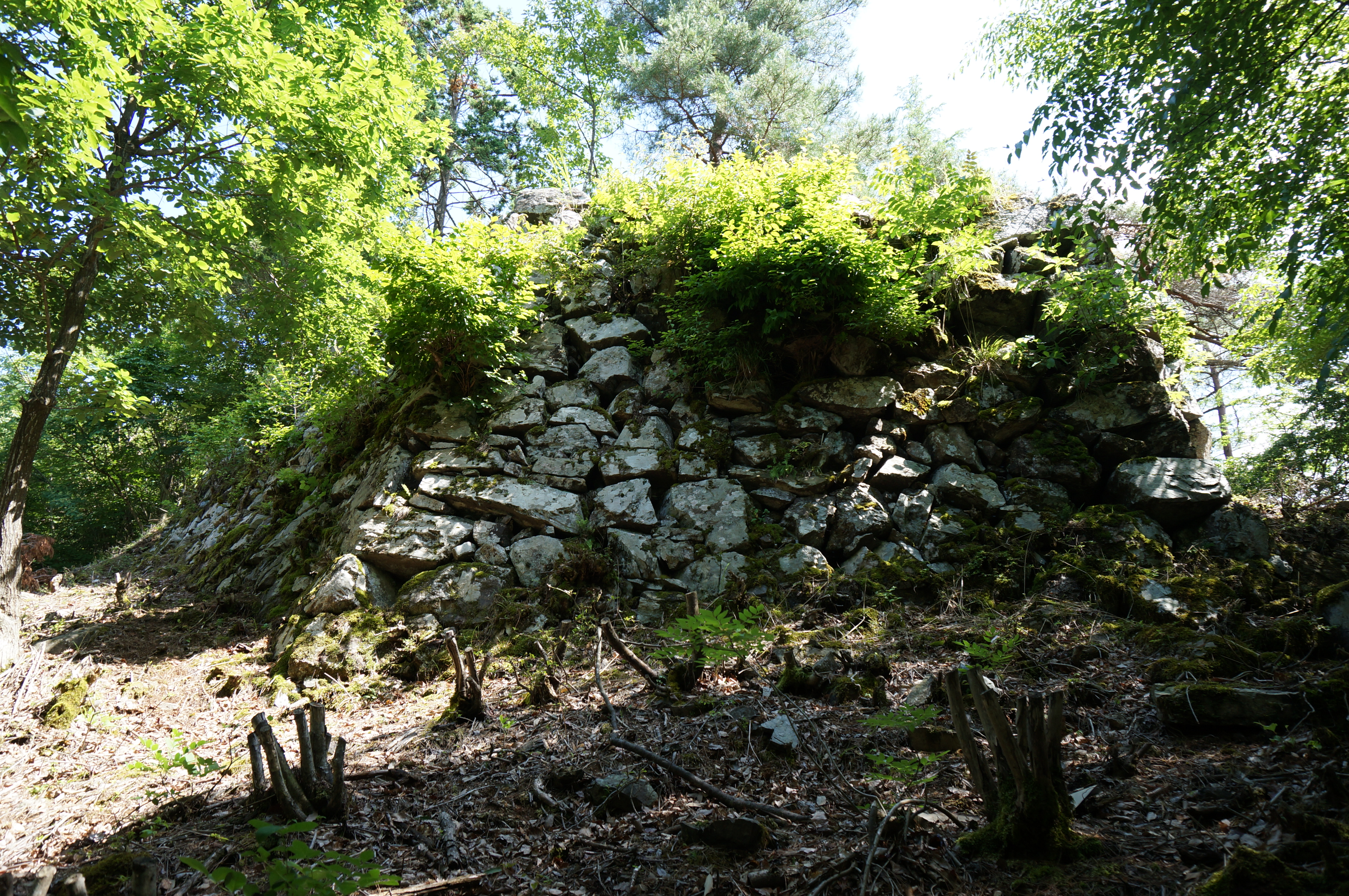
- Rokkaku Stone wall

Site information
- Type: mountaintop-style castle
- Condition: ruins

Location
- Wakasa Oniga Castle Wakasa Oniga Castle (Japan)
- Coordinates: 35°20′13″N 134°23′53″E

Site history
- Built: 13C
- Built by: Yabe clan
- Materials: Stone walls
- Demolished: 1617
- Events: Siege of Wakasa Oniga Castle

Garrison information
- Past commanders: Yamanaka Yukimori, Yagi Toyonobu, Yamazaki Iemori

Wakasa Oniga Castle (若桜鬼ヶ城, Wakasa Oniga-jō) was a Sengoku period mountain-top Japanese castle located in what is now the town of Wakasa, Tottori Prefecture, in the San'in region of Japan. The ruins of the castle were designated a National Historic Site in 2008.

== History ==
Wakasa Oniga Castle was located on the 150-meter Mountain Tsuruoyama in southeastern Inaba Province. It commanded a juncture of the roads from Tottori to Kyoto and Harima Province. This area had been under the control of the Yabe clan since the Kamakura period, and was the site of a small fortification. During the Sengoku period, when the area came under the control of the Yamana clan, the shugo of Inaba Province, the castle was rebuilt. In the 15th century, Inaba was fiercely contested between the weakened Yamana, and their powerful and aggressive neighbors, the Amago clan and Mōri clan. In 1575, Yamanaka Yukimori entered the castle However, attacked by the Mōri clan and abandoned the castle. With the rise of Oda Nobunaga, Inabe Province was conquered by Toyotomi Hideyoshi, he assigned Wakasa Oniga Castle to a relative, Kinoshita Shigekata. The castle was completely rebuilt per contemporary castle design concepts, such as the extensive use of stone walls, and Kinoshita was forced deeply into debt to pay for the construction.

The castle occupies the summit of the triangular-shaped hilltop in three concentric enclosures. The central bailey at the summit is roughly pentagonal, with 50-meter sides, and contains the ruined foundations of a tenshu which was 10 meters square. The entry to this central enclosure was via a compound gate to the northwest. The second and third enclosures were further down the slopes of the mountains, and each also had a compound gate protected by stone walls. The total size of the castle is about 150 by 50 meters.

Following the Battle of Sekigahara in 1600, Kinoshita Shigekata was forced to commit seppuku. Tokugawa Ieyasu awarded the castle to Yamazaki Iemori, a former Toyotomi retainer who had married a sister of Ikeda Terumasa, and who had rescued Ieyasu's daughter Tokuhime, who had been a hostage held by Ishida Mitsunari to ensure that the Tokugawa remained loyal. His son, Yamazaki Ieharu, was found at the Battle of Osaka in 1614-1615 and was rewarded by reassignment to a larger domain in Bitchu Province in 1617, and later to Marugame Domain. After his departure, Wakasa Oniga Castle was unoccupied and was under the control of the Ikeda clan of the Tottori Domain. It was abolished and broken due to the Tokugawa shogunate's rules limiting the number of castles per domain.

== Preservation ==
The castle is now only ruins, with stone walls and moats. Wakasa Oniga castle was listed as one of the Continued Top 100 Japanese Castles in 2017.

The castle site is a ten-minute walk from Wakasa Railway Wakasa Station.

== Gallery ==
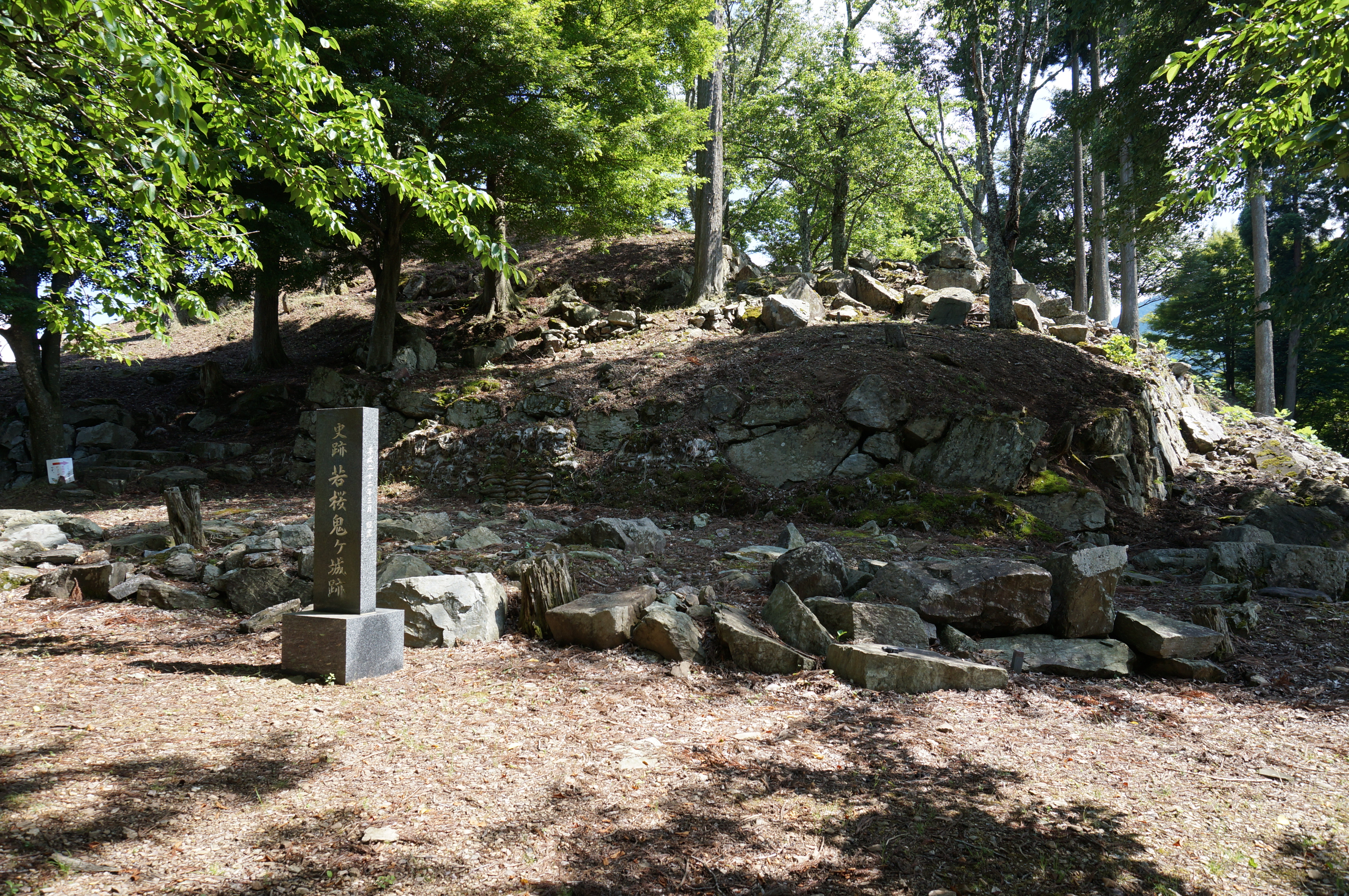
The stone wall of Honmaru Base

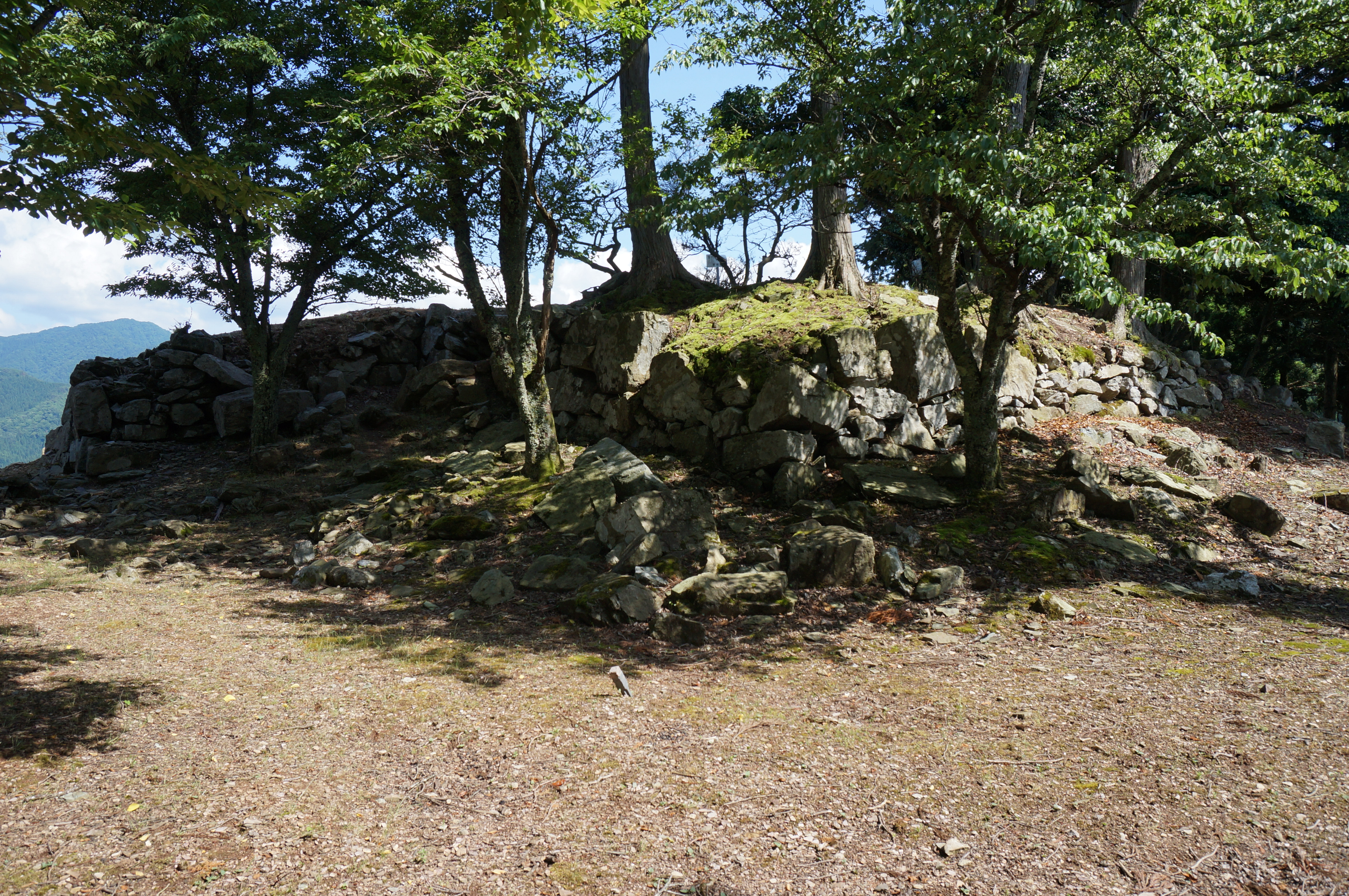
The stone wall of Tenshu

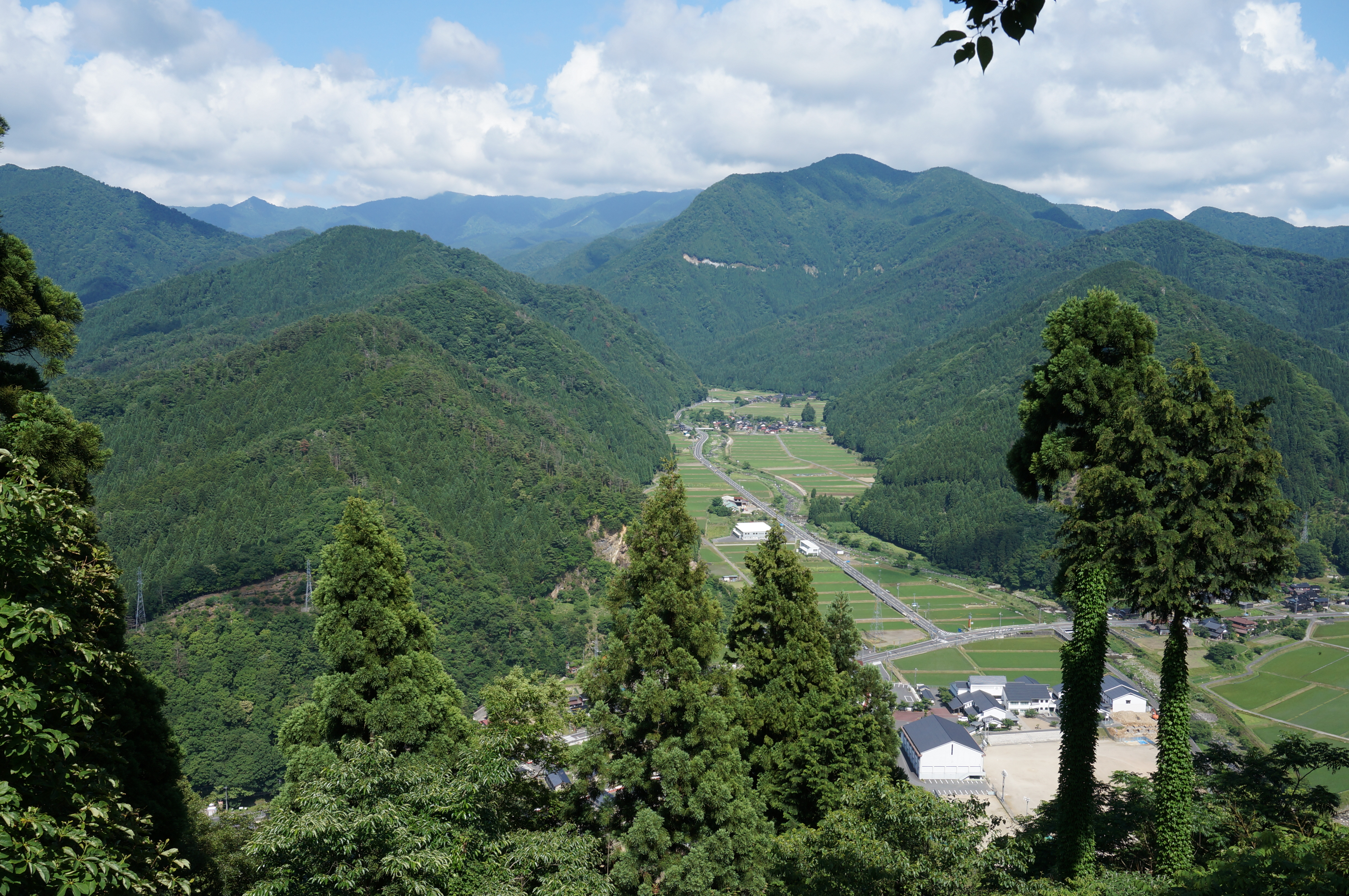
View from Wakasa Oniga Castle

== See also ==
- List of Historic Sites of Japan (Tottori)
