= Abe Station =

Railway station in Yazu, Tottori Prefecture, Japan

Abe Station 安部駅
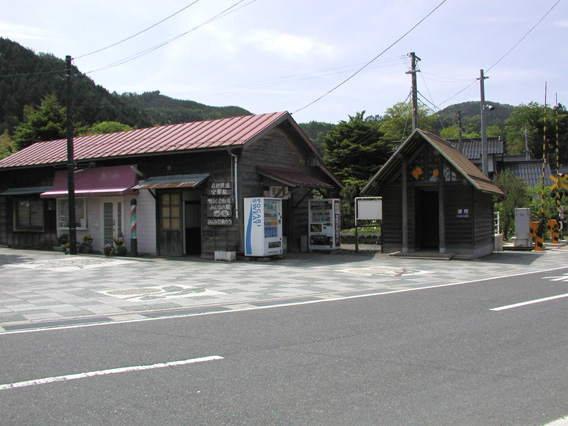
- Inabafunaoka Station, 2008

General information
- Location: Kusakabe, Yazu-cho, Yazu-gun, Tottori-ken 680-0526; Japan
- Coordinates: 35°22′28.69″N 134°17′29.53″E
- Operator: Wakasa Railway
- Line: ■ Wakasa Line
- Distance: 7.1 km (4.4 miles) from Kōge
- Platforms: 1 side platform
- Connections: Bus stop

Other information
- Status: Staffed

History
- Opened: 5 February 1932

Passengers
- FY2018: 54 daily
Location
- Location within Tottori Prefecture Location within Japan

Abe station (安部駅, Abe-eki) is a passenger railway station located in the town of Yazu, Yazu District, Tottori Prefecture, Japan. It is operated by the third sector company Wakasa Railway.

== Lines ==
Abe Station is served by the Wakasa Line, and is located 7.1 kilometers from the terminus of the line at Kōge. Only local trains stop at this station.

== Station layout ==
The station consists of one ground-level side platform serving a single bi-directional track. The wooden station building is integrated with a barber shop, and ticket sales are outsourced to the same shop, and the owner of the barber shop also serves as the station manager. The station will be unstaffed on days when the barber shop is closed.

== Adjacent stations ==
«	Service	»
Wakasa Railway
Wakasa Line
Hayabusa	-	Hattō

== History ==
Abe Station opened on February 5, 1932.

== Passenger statistics ==
In fiscal 2018, the station was used by an average of 54 passengers daily.

== Surrounding area ==
- Abe Elementary School
- Abe District Comprehensive Athletic Park

== See also ==
- List of railway stations in Japan
