= Koge station =

Koge Station may refer to:

- Køge station, a railway station in Køge, Denmark
- Kōge Station, a railway station in Tottori Prefecture, Japan

== See also ==
- Køge Nord Station, in Køge, Denmark
- Higashi-Kōge Station, in Yazu, Tottori Prefecture, Japan
