= Tsunoi Station =

Railway station in Tottori, Tottori Prefecture, Japan

Tsunoi Station 津ノ井駅
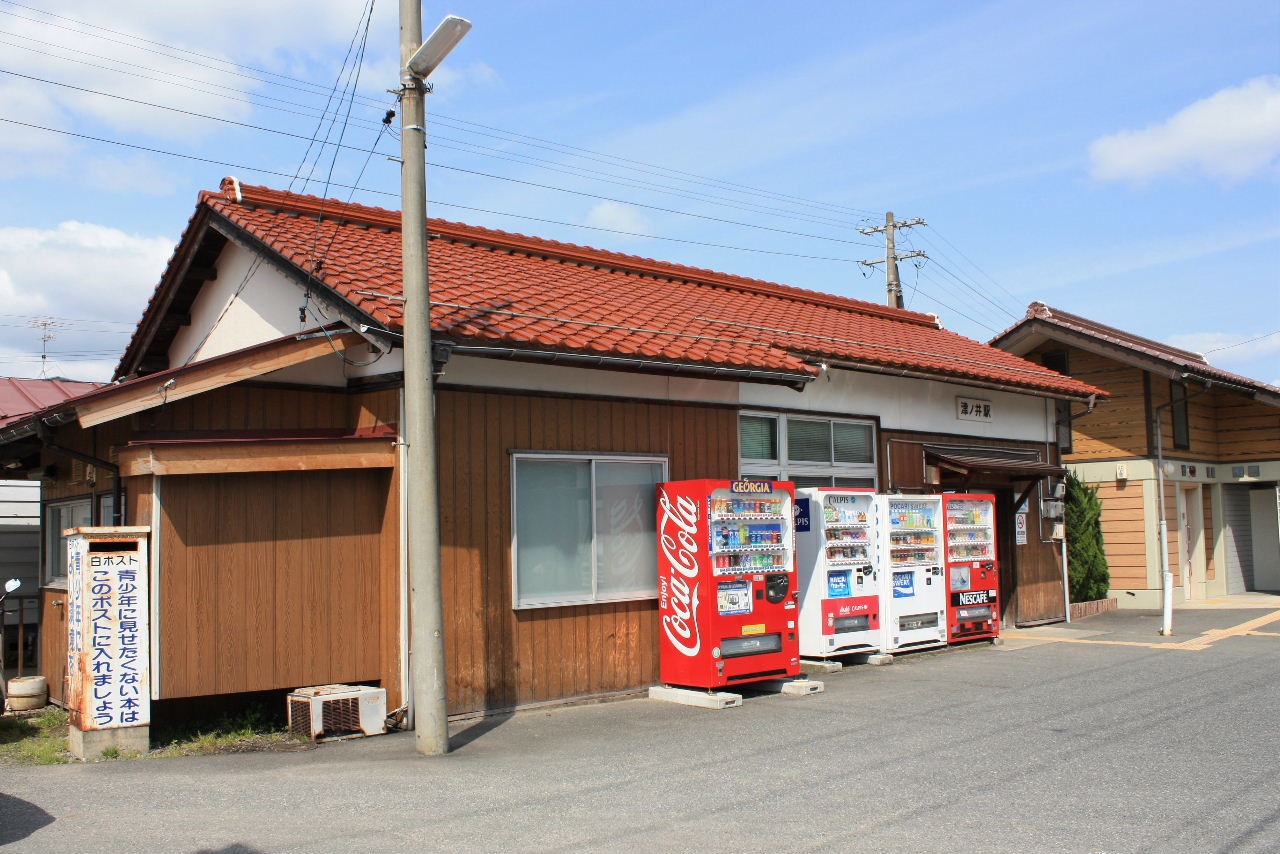
- Tsunoi Station, 2009

General information
- Location: Tsunoi, Tottori-shi, Tottori-ken 689-1102; Japan
- Coordinates: 35°27′40.82″N 134°14′55.52″E
- Operator: JR West
- Line: Inbi Line
- Distance: 4.3 km (2.7 miles) from Tottori
- Platforms: 1 island platforms
- Tracks: 2

Construction
- Structure type: At grade

Other information
- Status: Unstaffed
- Website: Official website

History
- Opened: 20 December 1919

Passengers
- 2020: 490 daily

Services
Preceding station	JR West	Following station
Higashi-Kōge towards Tsuyama	Inbi Line Local	Tottori Terminus
Location
- Location within Tottori Prefecture Location within Japan

Tsunoi Station (津ノ井駅, Tsunoi-eki) is a passenger railway station located in the city of Tottori, Tottori Prefecture, Japan. It is operated by the West Japan Railway Company (JR West).

== Lines ==
Tsunoi Station is served by the Inbi Line, and is located 4.3 kilometers from the terminus of the line at Tottori.

== Station layout ==
The station consists of one ground-level island platform connected to the wooden station building by a footbridge. The station is unattended.

=== Platforms ===
1	■ Inbi Line	for Chizu, Kamigōri and Wakasa
2	■ Inbi Line	for Tottori

== History ==
Tsunoi Station opened on December 20, 1919. With the privatization of the Japan National Railways (JNR) on April 1, 1987, the station came under the aegis of the West Japan Railway Company.

== Passenger statistics ==
In fiscal 2020, the station was used by an average of 490 passengers daily.

== Surrounding area ==
- Tottori University of Environmental Studies
- Tottori Prefectural Tottori Technical High School
- Tottori Municipal Tsunoi Elementary School

== See also ==
- List of railway stations in Japan
