= Tokumaru Station =

Railway station in Yazu, Tottori Prefecture, Japan

Tokumaru Station 徳丸駅
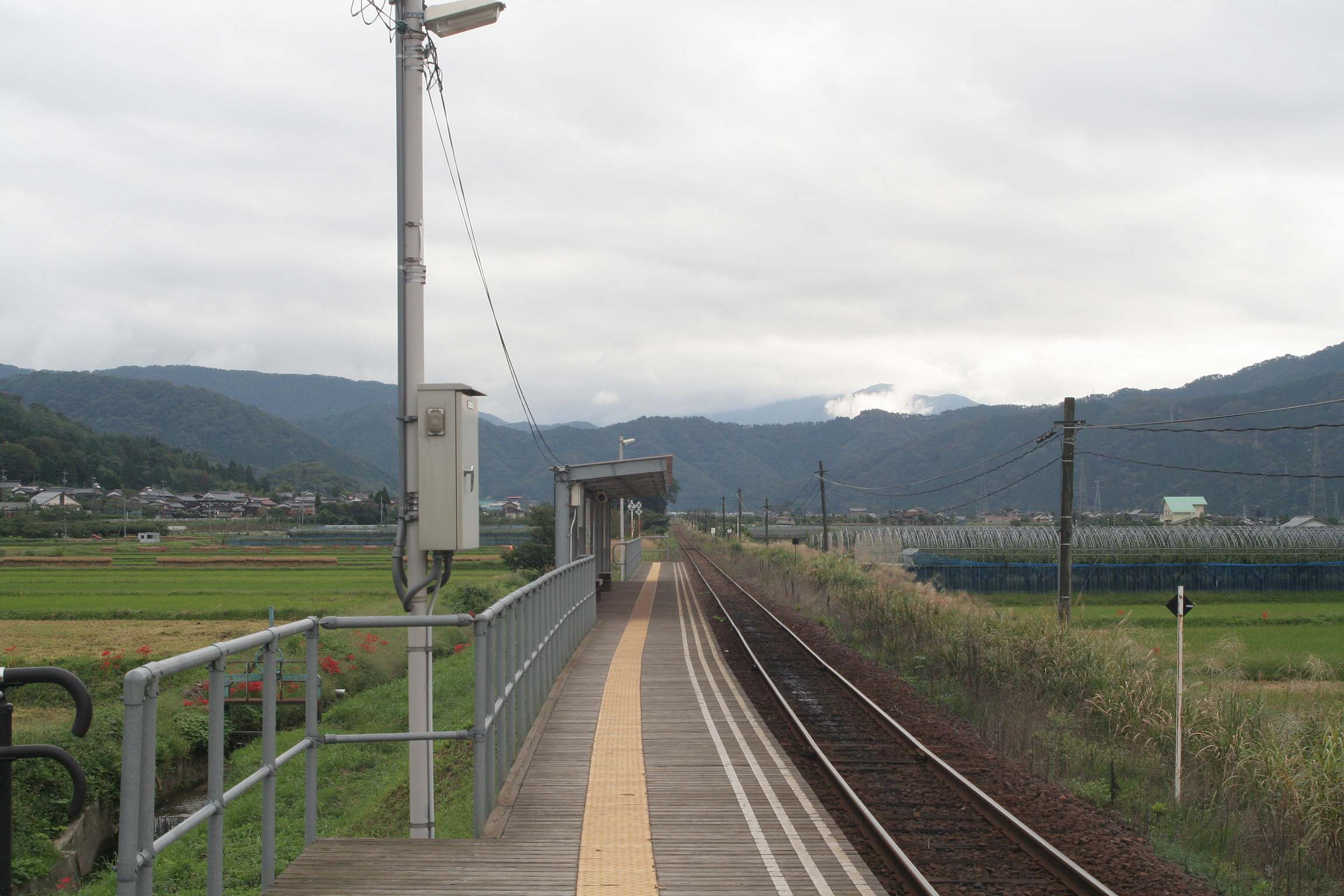
- Tokumaru Station

General information
- Location: Tokumaru, Yazu-cho, Yazu-gun, Tottori-ken 680-0607; Japan
- Coordinates: 35°21′52″N 134°20′8.5″E
- Operator: Wakasa Railway
- Line: ■ Wakasa Line
- Distance: 11.6 km (7.2 miles) from Kōge
- Platforms: 1 side platform
- Connections: Bus stop

Other information
- Status: Unstaffed

History
- Opened: 23 March 2002

Passengers
- FY2018: 32 daily
Location
- Location within Tottori Prefecture Location within Japan

Tokumaru Station (徳丸駅, Tokumaru-eki) is a passenger railway station located in the town of Yazu, Yazu District, Tottori Prefecture, Japan. It is operated by the third sector company Wakasa Railway.

== Lines ==
Tokumaru Station is served by the Wakasa Line, and is located 11.6 kilometers from the terminus of the line at Kōge. Only local trains stop at this station.

== Station layout ==
The station consists of one ground-level side platform serving a single bi-directional track. There is no station building and the station is unattended.

== Adjacent stations ==
«	Service	»
Wakasa Railway
Wakasa Line
Hattō	-	Tampi

== History ==
Tokumaru Station opened on March 23, 2002.

== Passenger statistics ==
In fiscal 2018, the station was used by an average of 32 passengers daily.

== Surrounding area ==
- Hatto General Athletic Park
- Road Station Hatto
- Hatto River

== See also ==
- List of railway stations in Japan
