= Higashi-Kōge Station =

Railway station in Yazu, Tottori Prefecture, Japan

Higashi-Kōge Station 東郡家駅
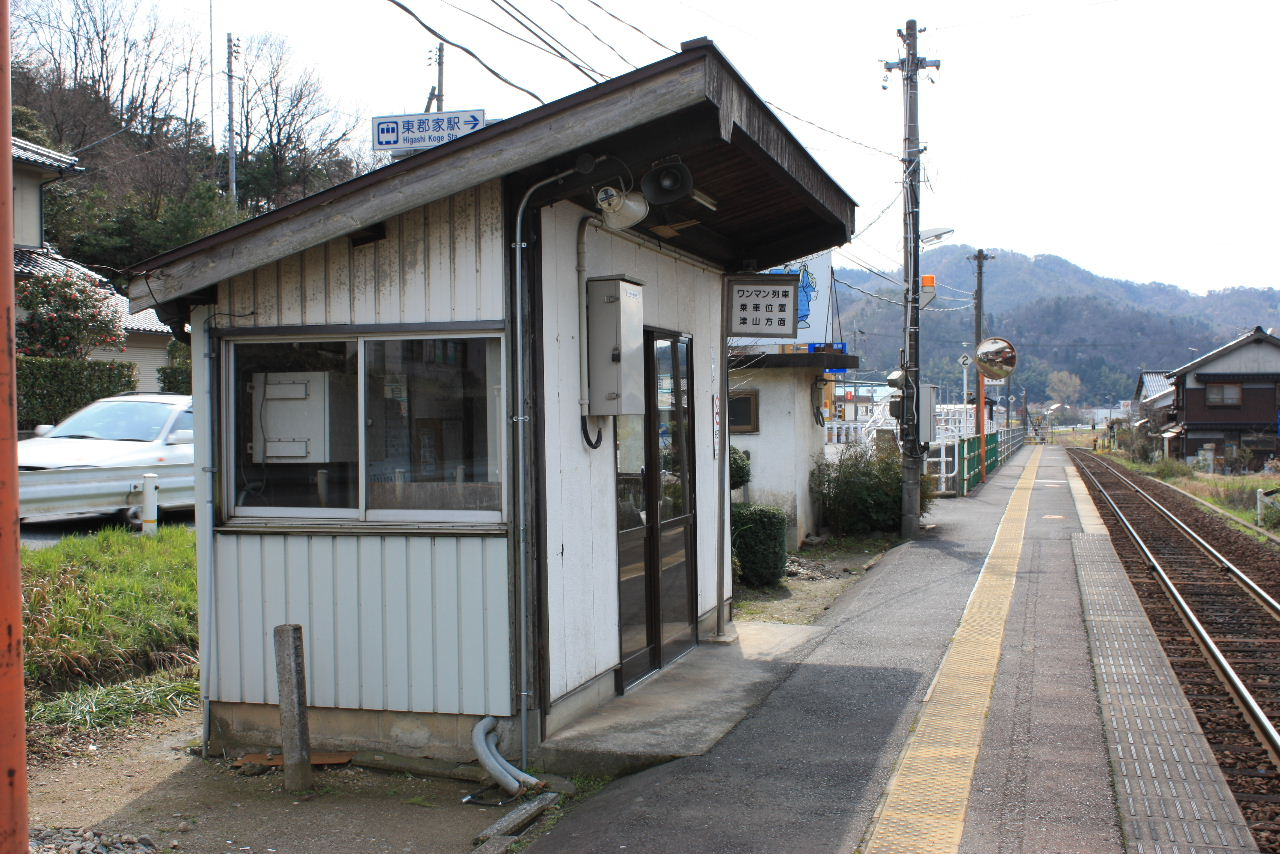
- Higashi-Kōge Station, March 2009

General information
- Location: Horigoshi, Yazu-cho, Yazu-gun, Tottori-ken 680-0423; Japan
- Coordinates: 35°25′44.24″N 134°15′35.98″E
- Owner: JR West
- Operator: JR West
- Line: Inbi Line
- Distance: 9.2 km (5.7 miles) from Tottori
- Platforms: 1 side platform
- Connections: Bus stop

Other information
- Status: Unstaffed
- Website: Official website

History
- Opened: 1 November 1956

Passengers
- FY2018: 148 daily

Services
Preceding station	JR West	Following station
Kōge towards Tsuyama	Inbi Line Local	Tsunoi towards Tottori
Location
- Location within Tottori Prefecture Location within Japan

Higashi-Kōge Station (東郡家駅, Higashi-Kōge-eki) is a passenger railway station located in the town of Yazu, Yazu District, Tottori Prefecture, Japan.. It is operated by the West Japan Railway Company (JR West).

== Lines ==
Higashi-Kōge Station is served by the Inbi Line, and is located 8.2 kilometers from the terminus of the line at Tottori. Only local trains stop at this station.

== Station layout ==
The station consists of one ground-level side platform serving a single bi-directional track. There is no station building, and a waiting area is placed on the platform. The station is unattended.

== History ==
Higashi-Kōge Station opened on November 1, 1956. With the privatization of the Japan National Railways (JNR) on April 1, 1987, the station came under the aegis of the West Japan Railway Company.

== Passenger statistics ==
In fiscal 2018, the station was used by an average of 148 passengers daily.

== Surrounding area ==
- Yazu Town Gunge East Elementary School
- Japan National Route 29

== See also ==
- List of railway stations in Japan
