= Wakasa Station =

Railway station in Wakasa, Tottori Prefecture, Japan

Wakasa Station 若桜駅
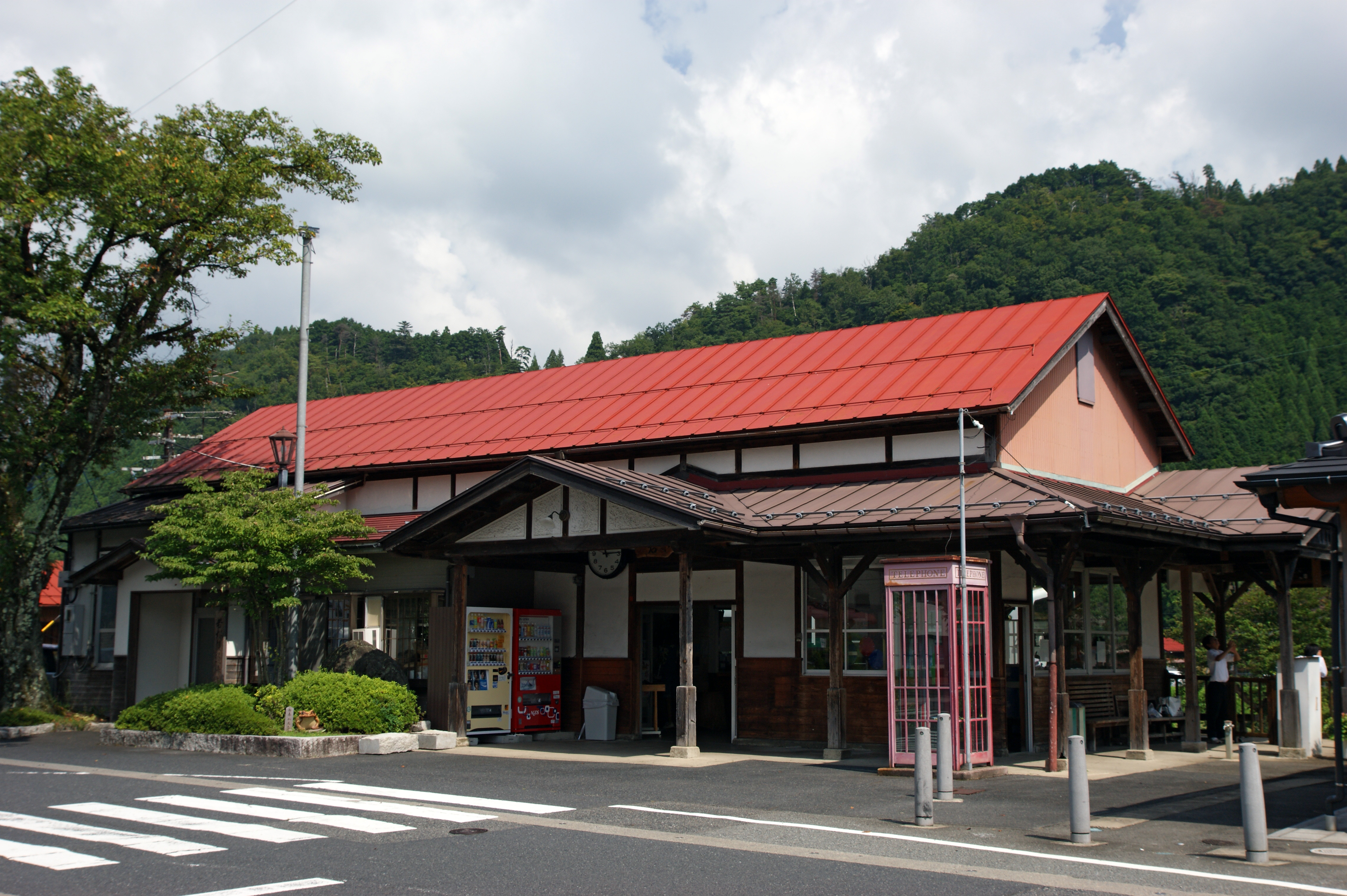
- Wakasa Station, September 2008

General information
- Location: 345-2 Wakasa Renkyojishitamo, Wakasa-cho, Yazu-gun, Tottori-ken 680-0701; Japan
- Coordinates: 35°20′42.80″N 134°23′53.78″E
- Operator: Wakasa Railway
- Line: ■ Wakasa Line
- Distance: 19.25 km (11.96 miles) from Kōge
- Platforms: 1 side platform
- Connections: Bus stop

Other information
- Status: Staffed

History
- Opened: 1 December 1930

Passengers
- FY2018: 249 daily
Location
- Location within Tottori Prefecture Location within Japan

Wakasa Station (若桜駅, Wakasa-eki-eki) is a passenger railway station located in the town of Wakasa, Yazu District, Tottori Prefecture, Japan. It is operated by the third sector company Wakasa Railway.

== Lines ==
Wakasa Station is a terminus of the Wakasa Line, and is located 19.2 kilometers from the opposing terminus of the line at Kōge.

== Station layout ==
The station consists of one ground-level side platform serving a single bi-directional track, with an additional siding track and turntable. A JNR Class C12 locomotive converted to run on compressed air, is on display at this station. The wooden station building and platform were built in 1930 and were registered as Tangible Cultural Property in 2008. This designation also includes the Storage room, Lamp room, western box guard, eastern box guard, garage, turntable, water tower, bridge and drainage ditch.

== Adjacent stations ==
«	Service	»
Wakasa Railway
Wakasa Line
Tampi	-	Terminus

== History ==
Wakasa Station opened on 1 December 1930.

== Passenger statistics ==
In fiscal 2018, the station was used by an average of 249 passengers daily.

== Surrounding area ==
- Wakasa Jinja
- Route 29
- Route 482

== See also ==
- List of railway stations in Japan
