= Kawahara Station =

Railway station in Yazu, Tottori Prefecture, Japan

Kawahara Station 河原駅
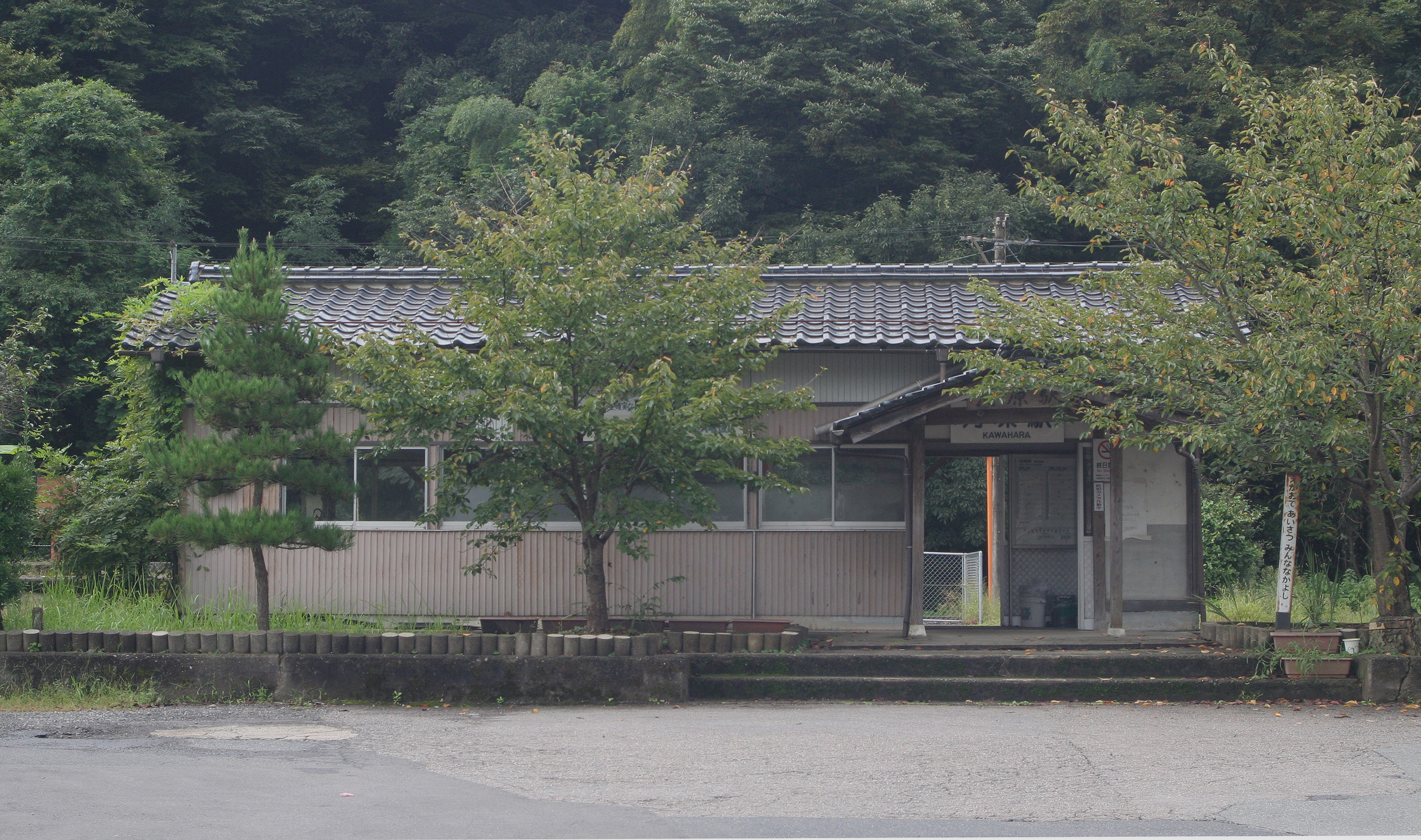
- Kawahara Station, October 2007

General information
- Location: Kuninaka, Yazu-cho, Yazu-gun, Tottori-ken 680-0457; Japan
- Coordinates: 35°23′52.08″N 134°13′21.41″E
- Owner: JR West
- Operator: JR West
- Line: Inbi Line
- Distance: 14.1 km (8.8 miles) from Tottori
- Platforms: 1 side platform
- Connections: Bus stop

Construction
- Structure type: Ground level

Other information
- Status: Unstaffed
- Website: Official website

History
- Opened: 20 December 1919

Passengers
- FY2018: 79 daily

Services
Preceding station	JR West	Following station
Kunifusa towards Tsuyama	Inbi Line Local	Kōge towards Tottori
Location
- Location within Tottori Prefecture Location within Japan

Kawahara Station (河原駅, Kawahara-eki) is a passenger railway station located in the town of Yazu, Yazu District, Tottori Prefecture, Japan.. It is operated by the West Japan Railway Company (JR West).

== Lines ==
Kawahara Station is served by the Inbi Line, and is located 14.1 kilometers from the terminus of the line at Tottori. Only local trains stop at this station.

== Station layout ==
The station consists of one ground-level side platform serving a single bi-directional track. It used to have an island platform with two tracks on one side, but the track on one side has been removed. The wooden station building remains, and is connected to the platform by a level crossing. The station is unattended.

== History ==
Kawahara Station opened on December 20, 1919. With the privatization of the Japan National Railways (JNR) on April 1, 1987, the station came under the aegis of the West Japan Railway Company.

== Passenger statistics ==
In fiscal 2018, the station was used by an average of 79 passengers daily.

== Surrounding area ==
- Tottori Prefectural Road No. 32 Gunke Kano Keko Line
- Tottori Prefectural Road 229 Yoneokagawara Station Line

== See also ==
- List of railway stations in Japan
