= Yazukōkōmae Station =

Railway station in Yazu, Tottori Prefecture, Japan

Yazukōkōmae Station 八頭高校前駅
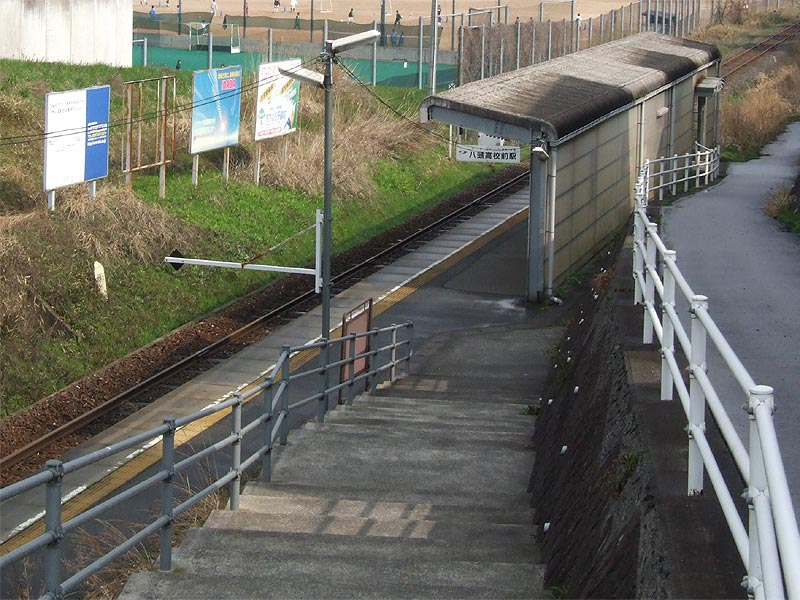
- Yazukōkōmae Station, 2008

General information
- Location: Kunoji, Yazu-cho, Yazu-gun, Tottori-ken 680-0451; Japan
- Coordinates: 35°24′19.78″N 134°14′46.73″E
- Operator: Wakasa Railway
- Line: ■ Wakasa Line
- Distance: 0.9 km (0.56 miles) from Kōge
- Platforms: 1 side platform
- Connections: Bus stop

Other information
- Status: Unstaffed

History
- Opened: 1 October 1996

Passengers
- FY2018: 367 daily
Location
- Location within Tottori Prefecture Location within Japan

Yazukōkōmae Station (八頭高校前駅, Yazukōkōmae-eki) is a passenger railway station located in the town of Yazu, Yazu District, Tottori Prefecture, Japan. It is operated by the third sector company Wakasa Railway.

== Lines ==
Yazukōkōmae Station is served by the Wakasa Line, and is located 0.9 kilometers from the terminus of the line at Kōge. Only local trains stop at this station.

== Station layout ==
The station consists of one ground-level side platform serving a single bi-directional track. There is no station building, and a waiting area is placed on the platform. The station is unattended.

== Adjacent stations ==
«	Service	»
Wakasa Railway
Wakasa Line
Kōge	-	Inabafunaoka

== History ==
Yazukōkōmae Station opened on October 1, 1996.

== Passenger statistics ==
In fiscal 2018, the station was used by an average of 367 passengers daily.

== Surrounding area ==
- Tottori Prefectural Yazu High School
- Yazu Town Koge Nishi Elementary School

== See also ==
- List of railway stations in Japan
