= Wakasa Shrine =

Shinto shrine in Tottori Prefecture, Japan

Wakasa Jinja (若桜神社)
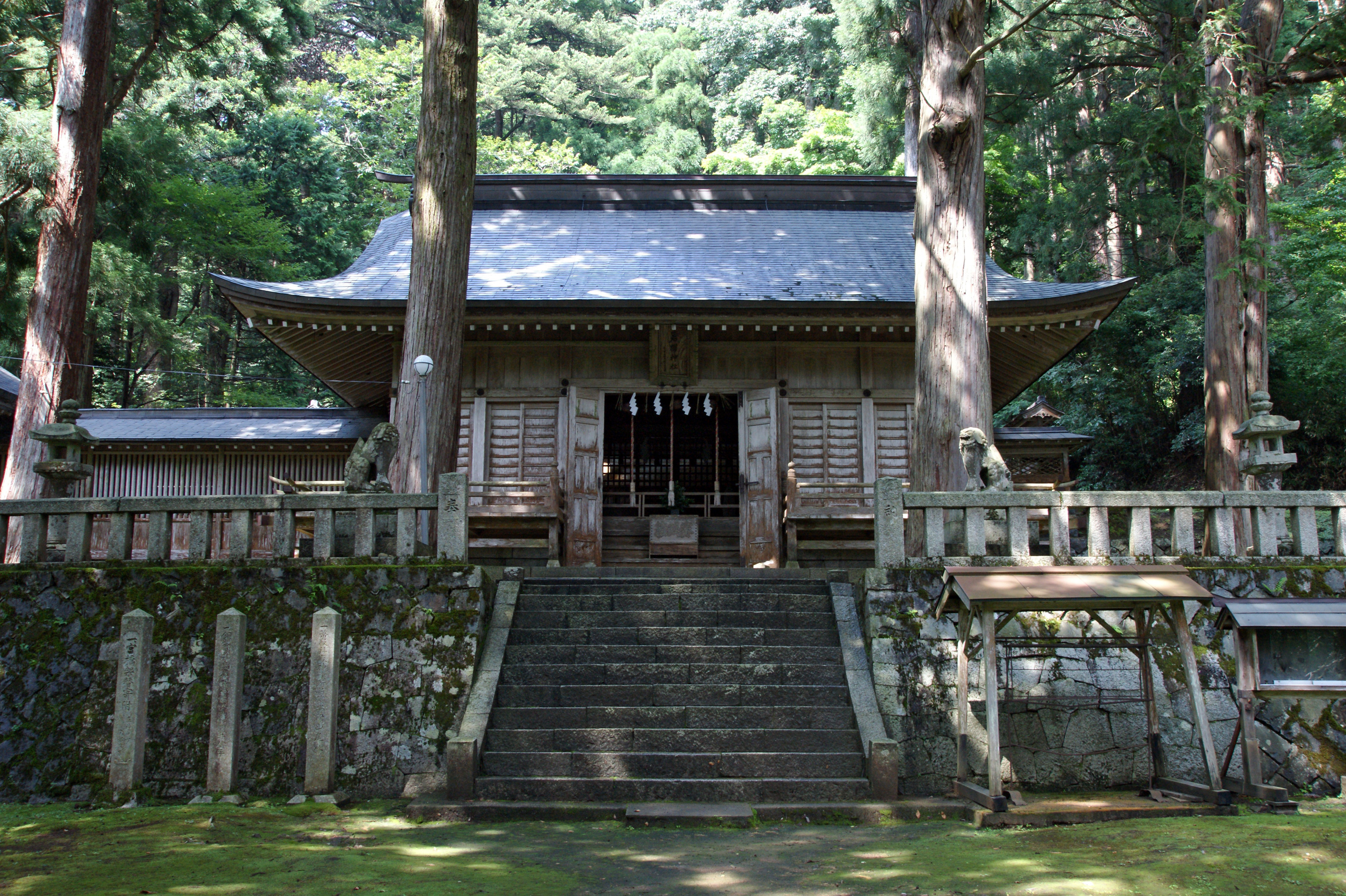
- Wakasa Jinja

- Wakasa Jinja Wakasa Shrine (Japan)

Religion
- Affiliation: Shinto
- Festival: May 3

Location
- Interactive map of Wakasa Jinja (若桜神社)
- Coordinates: 35°20′34.9″N 134°23′30.3″E

Architecture
- Founder: Yabe clan
- Established: c. Heian period

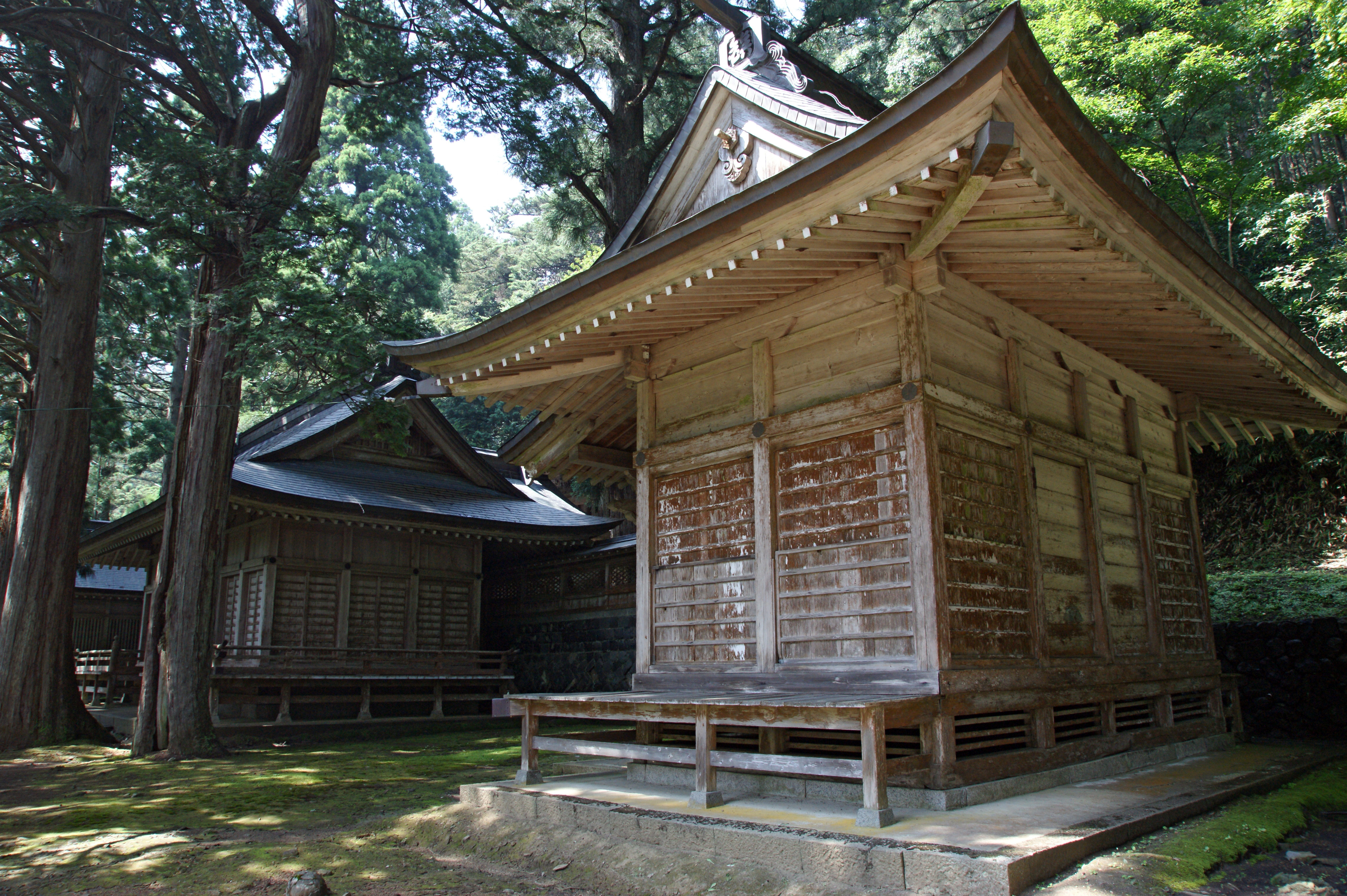
Wakasa-jinja10n4592

Wakasa Jinja (若桜神社) is a Shinto shrine in Wakasa, Tottori Prefecture, Japan. The main festival is held in May.

== History ==
Wakasa Jinja is said to have been built in the early Heian period by the Yabe clan, the builders of Wakasa Oniga Castle. It was originally called the "Matsugami Daimyojin". Even after Wakasa Oniga Castle was abandoned, the shrine was protected by the Ikeda clan, daimyo of Tottori Domain in the Edo Period.

The precincts of the shrine are covered with extensive virgin forests of Japanese cypress and fir trees, and have been designated as a Natural Monument by Tottori Prefecture as the "Wakasa Shrine Shrine Forest"

== See also ==
Media related to Wakasa-jinja (Wakasa) at Wikimedia Commons
