= Wakasa Line =

Railway line in Tottori prefecture, Japan

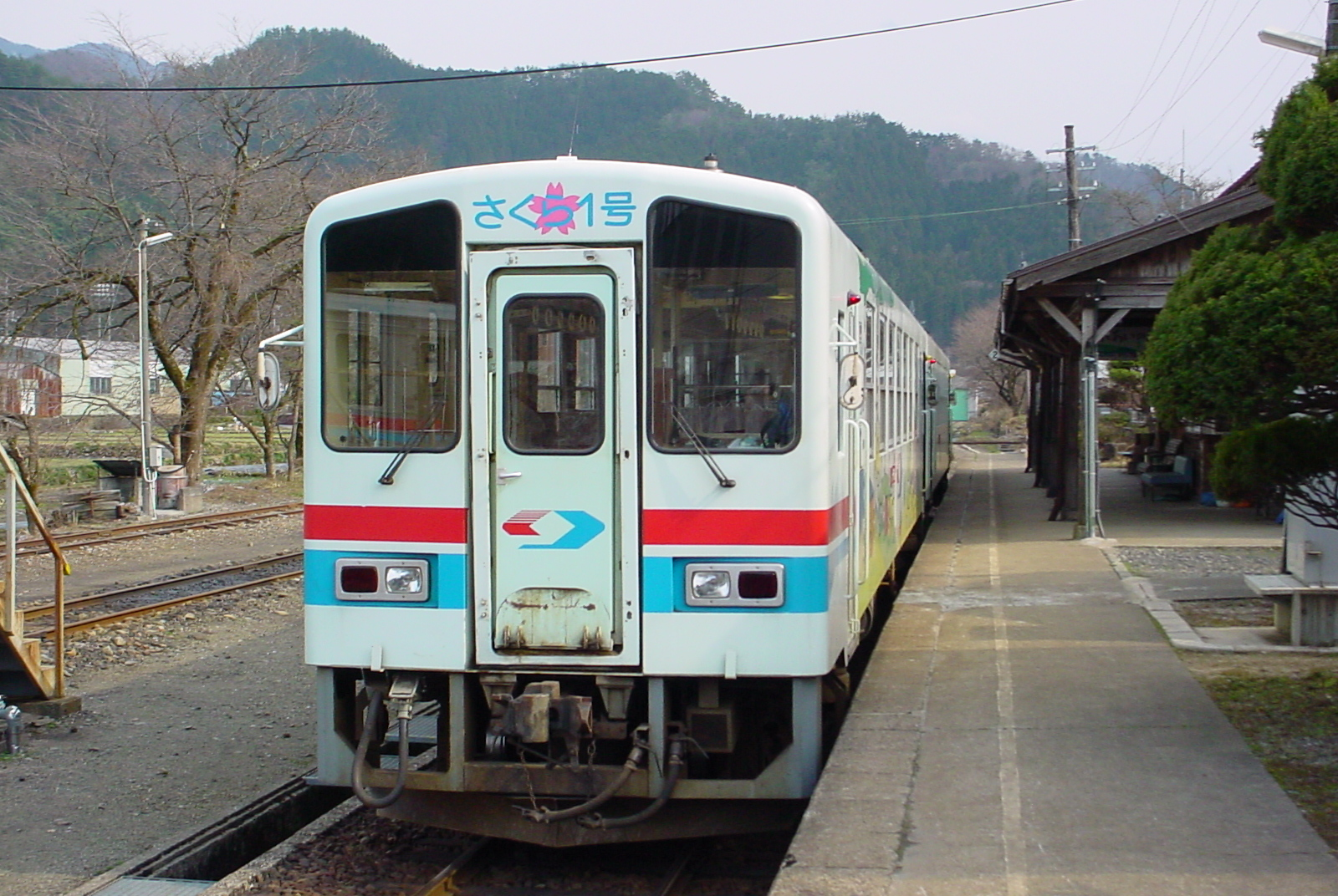
- Wakasa Railway "Sakura 1" train

Overview
- Status: Operational
- Owner: Wakasa Railway Company
- Locale: Tottori Prefecture
- Termini: Kōge; Wakasa
- Stations: 9
- Website: https://wakatetsu.co.jp/

Service
- Operator: Wakasa Railway Company

History
- Opened: 20 January 1930

Technical
- Track length: 19.2 km (11.9 mi)
- Num of tracks: Entire line single tracked
- Character: Rural
- Track gauge: 1,067 mm (3 ft 6 in)
- Minimum radius: 300 m
- Electrification: None
- Operating speed: 65 km/h (40 mph)

The Wakasa Line (若桜線, Wakasa-sen) is a Japanese railway line in Tottori Prefecture operated by the third-sector operating company Wakasa Railway (若桜鉄道, Wakasa Tetsudō). The line connects Kōge Station in Yazu with Wakasa Station in Wakasa. It is the only railway line operated by Wakasa Railway. The third-sector company took over operations of the former West Japan Railway Company (JR West) line in 1987.

== Owners and operator ==
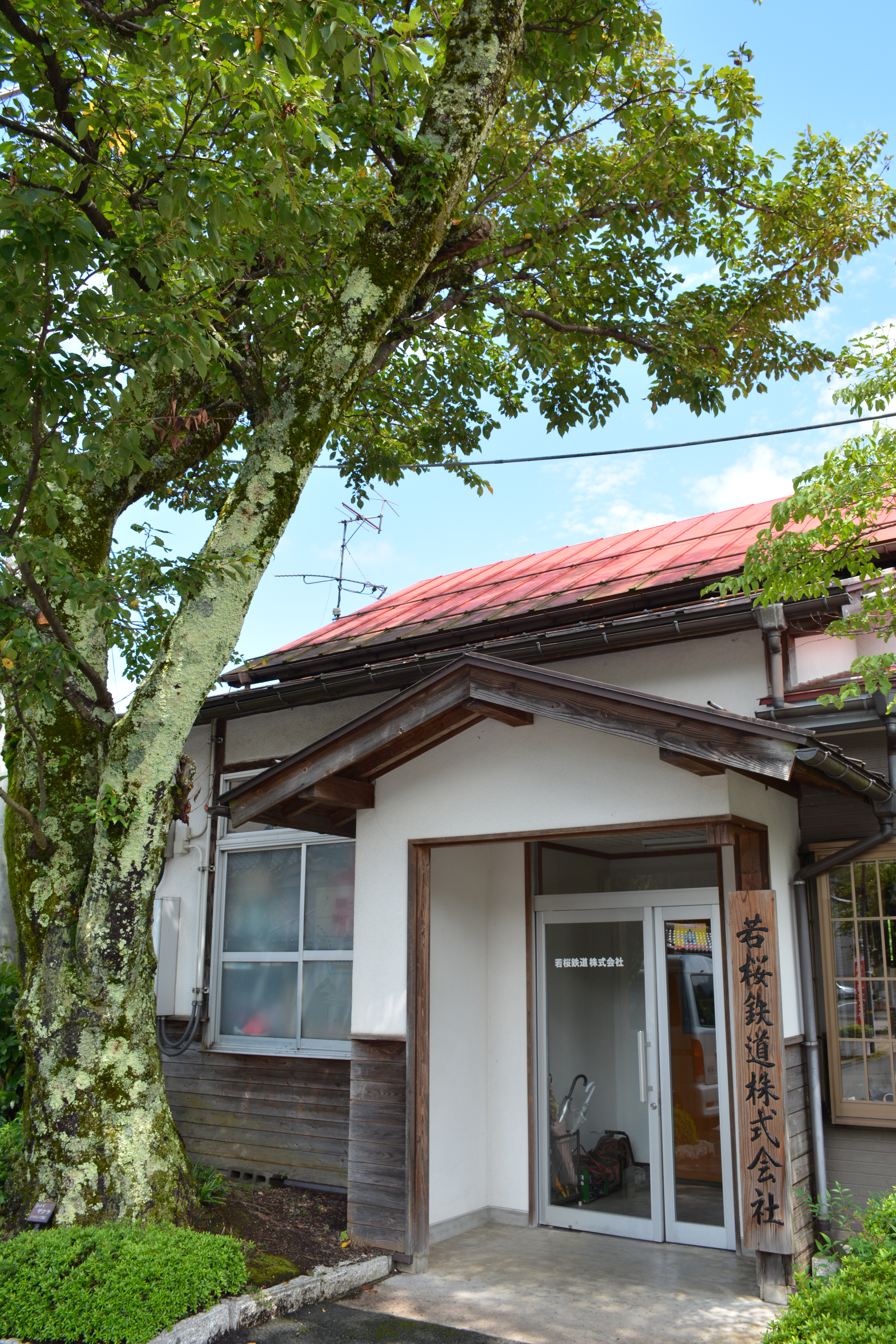
Wakasa Railway head office

The line is operated by Wakasa Railway Co., Ltd. Although the company originally owned the railway line, on April 1, 2009, the ownership was transferred to the municipalities (towns) where the line exists and the company became a pure operator of the railway as a Category 2 Railway Operator. The town of Yazu owns 16.5 km of track and the town of Wakasa owns 2.7 km of track as Category 3 Railway Operators.

== Stations ==
- Some trains operate through from the JR West Inbi Line (Tottori - Kōge).

Name	Japanese	Distance (km)	Transfers	Location	
Through service to Tottori on the Inbi Line
Kōge	郡家	0.0	Inbi Line	Yazu	Tottori
Yazu-Kōkō-mae	八頭高校前	0.9		Yazu	Tottori
Inaba-Funaoka	因幡船岡	2.4		Yazu	Tottori
Hayabusa	隼	4.4		Yazu	Tottori
Abe	安部	7.1		Yazu	Tottori
Hattō	八東	9.8		Yazu	Tottori
Tokumaru	徳丸	11.6		Yazu	Tottori
Tampi	丹比	13.5		Yazu	Tottori
Wakasa	若桜	19.2		Wakasa	Tottori

== Rolling stock ==
=== Diesel railcars ===
From the start of third-sector operations in 1987, the line was operated using a fleet of four WT2500 series diesel cars. Three of these were subsequently refurbished, becoming WT3000 series, and a new stainless steel WT3300 series diesel car, WT3301, was also added to the fleet.

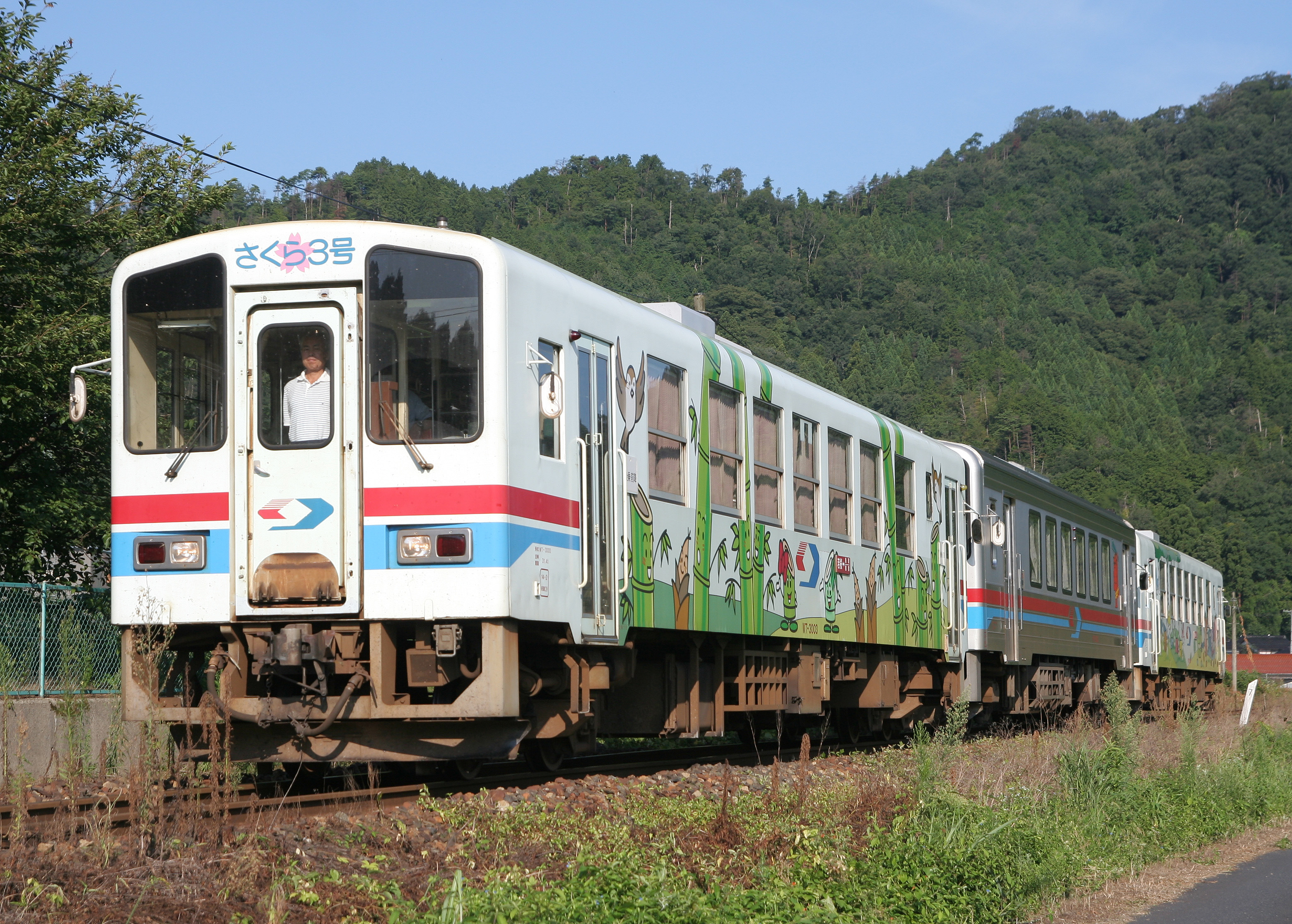
WT3000 series car 3003 Sakura 3 in August 2009

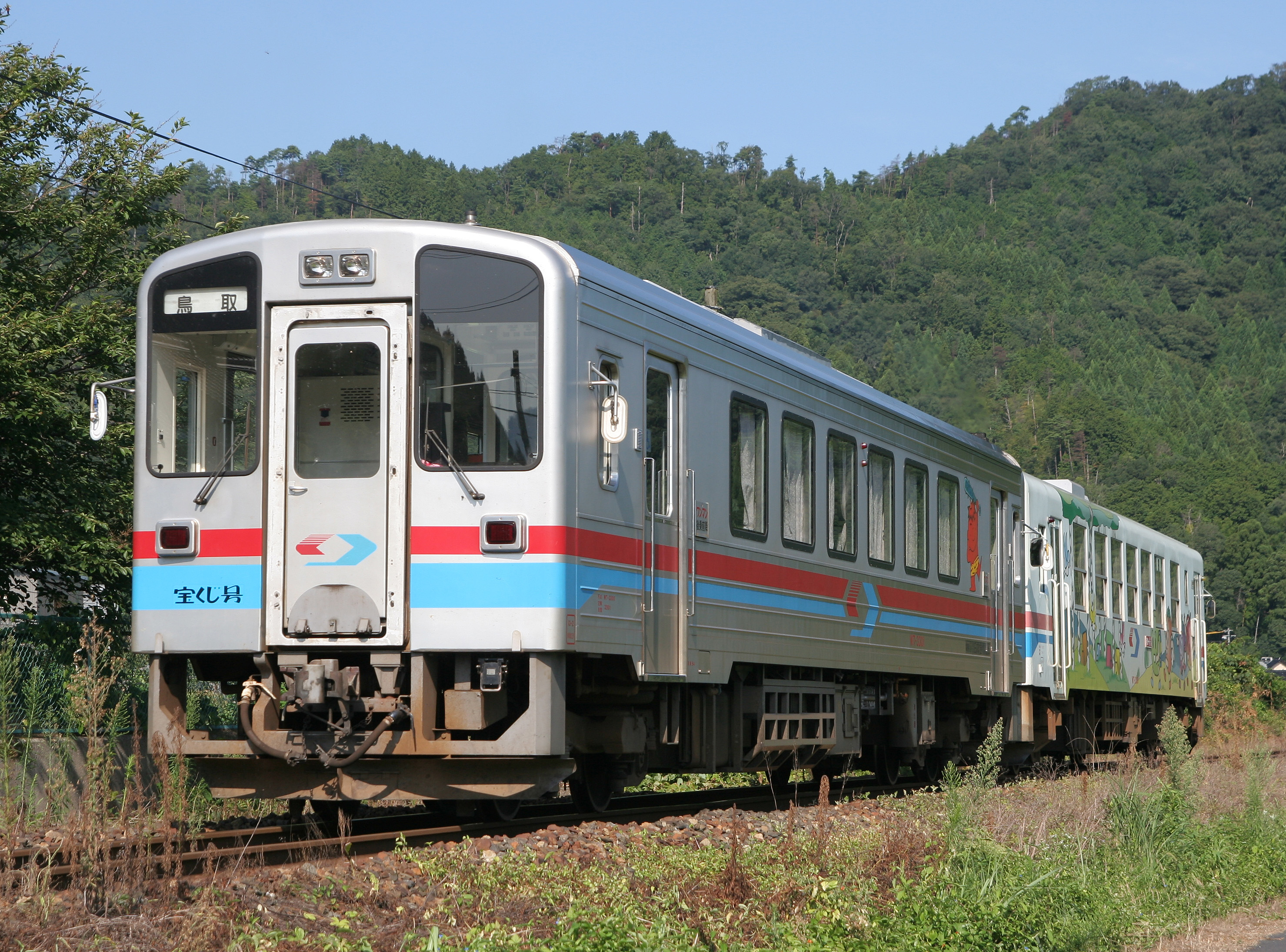
WT3300 series car 3301 in August 2009

=== Locomotives ===
The railway owns a former JNR Class DD16 diesel locomotive, number DD16 7, previously used at the Railway Technical Research Institute in Kokubunji, Tokyo, and former JNR Class C12 2-6-2T steam locomotive number C12 167.

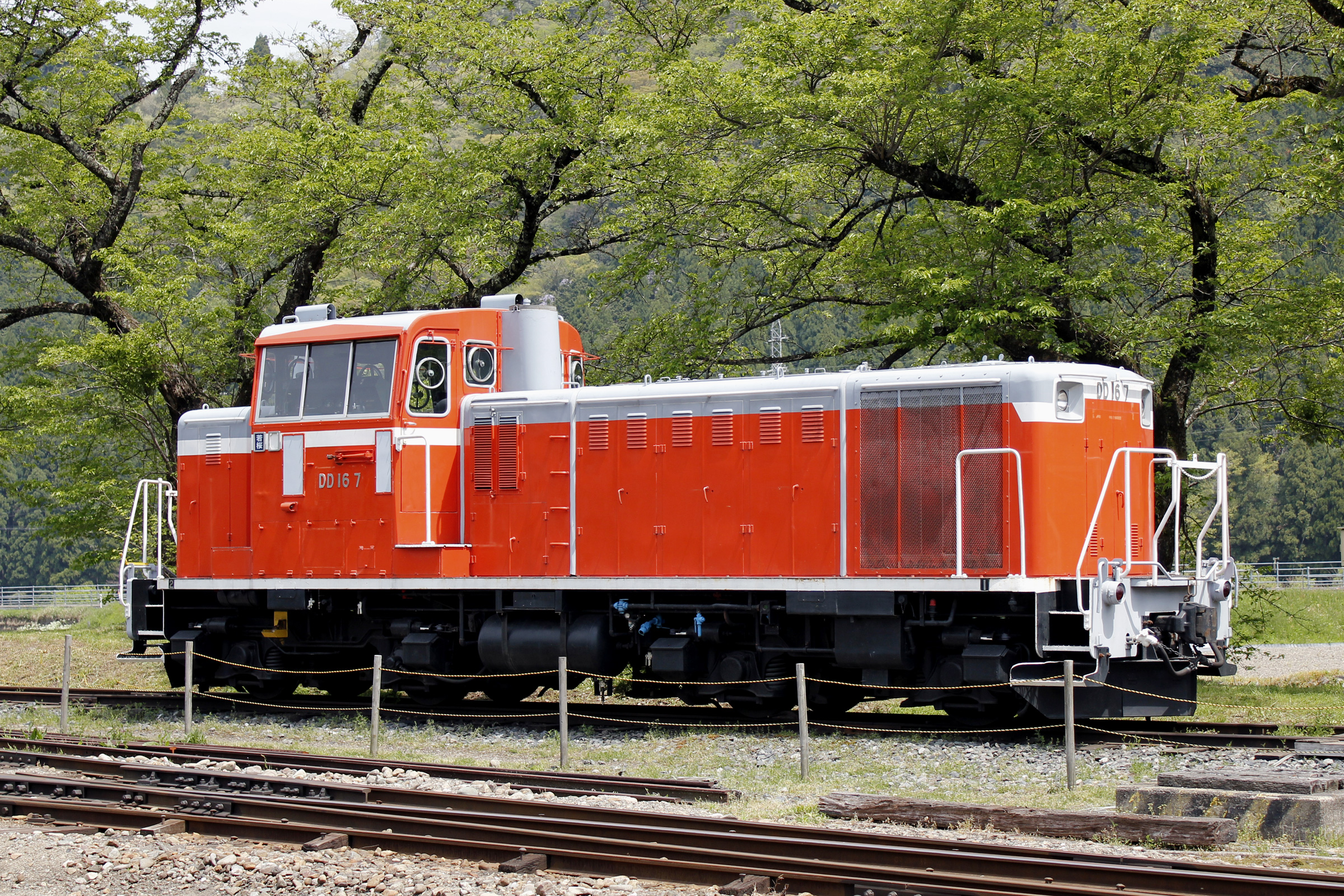
Class DD16 diesel locomotive DD16 7 in April 2013

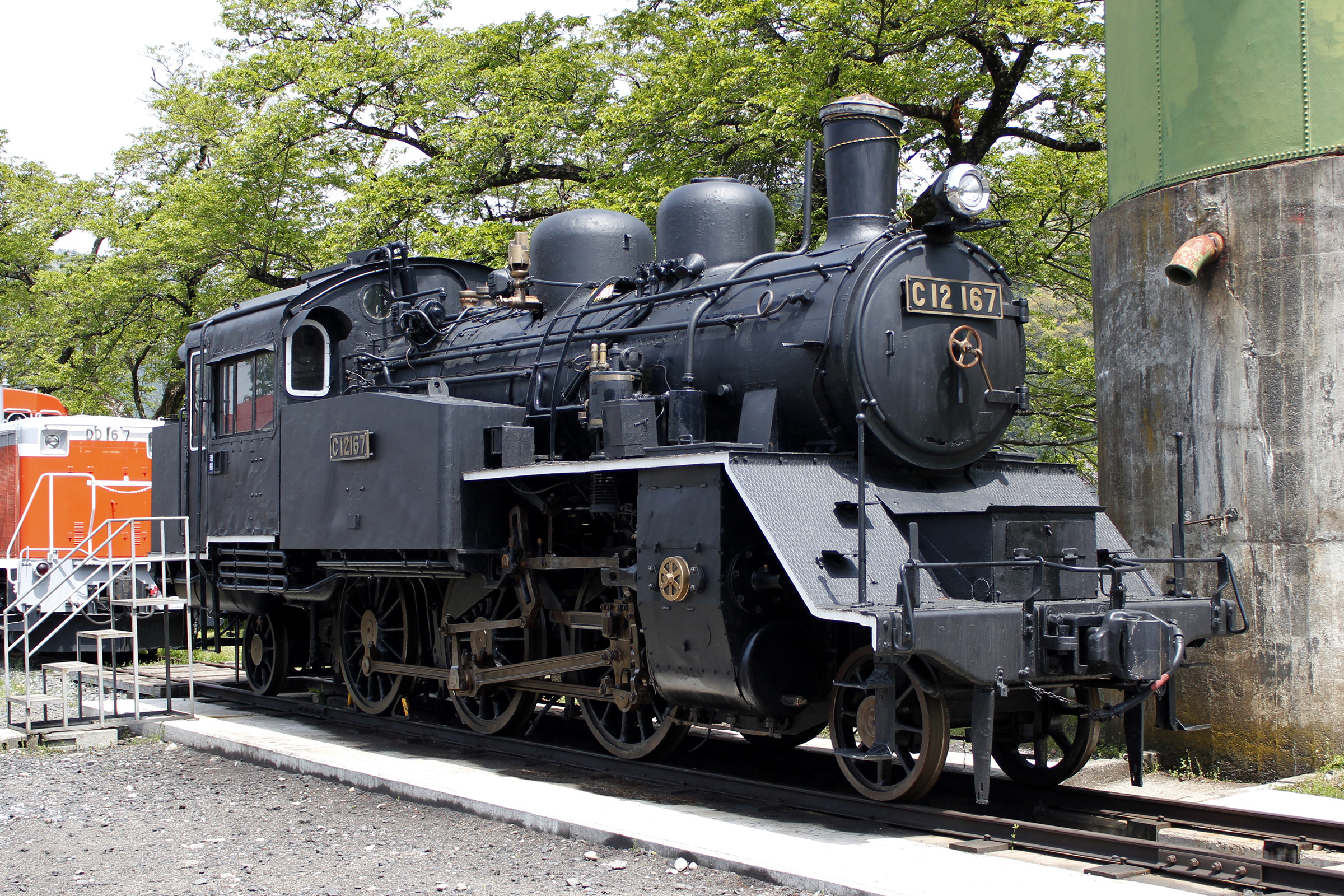
Class C12 steam locomotive C12 167 in April 2013

== History ==
The line opened on 20 January 1930 as the 4.5 km Wakasa Line from Kōge to Hayabusa. The entire line to Wakasa opened on 1 December 1930. The original plan was to extend the line beyond Wakasa to the Sanin Main Line, near Yōka Station, but this was never realized.

Freight services were discontinued from 1 October 1974.

With the privatization of JNR in April 1987, the Wakasa Line was transferred to the ownership of West Japan Railway Company (JR West). However, JR West ceased operations on the line on 13 October 1987, with operations taken over by the third-sector Wakasa Railway Company from 14 October.

== See also ==
- List of railway companies in Japan
- List of railway lines in Japan
