= Japan National Route 29 =

National highway in Japan

National Route 29
- 国道29号

Route information
- Length: 119.7 km (74.4 mi)
- Existed: 4 December 1952–present

Major junctions
- North end: National Route 2 in Himeji
- South end: National Route 9 in Tottori

Location
- Country: Japan

Highway system
- National highways of Japan; Expressways of Japan
← National Route 28	→ National Route 30

National Route 29 (国道29号, Kokudō nijūkyū-gō) is a national highway connecting Himeji and Tottori in Japan.

== Route data ==
- Length: 119.7 km (74.4 mi)
- Origin: Himeji
- Terminus: Tottori (ends at junction with Route 9)
- Major cities: Tatsuno, Shisō

== History ==
- 1952-12-04 - First Class National Highway 29 (from Himeji to Tottori)
- 1965-04-01 - General National Highway 29 (from Himeji to Tottori)

== Intersects with ==
- Hyogo Prefecture
- Tottori Prefecture
