= Tangible cultural property (Japan) =

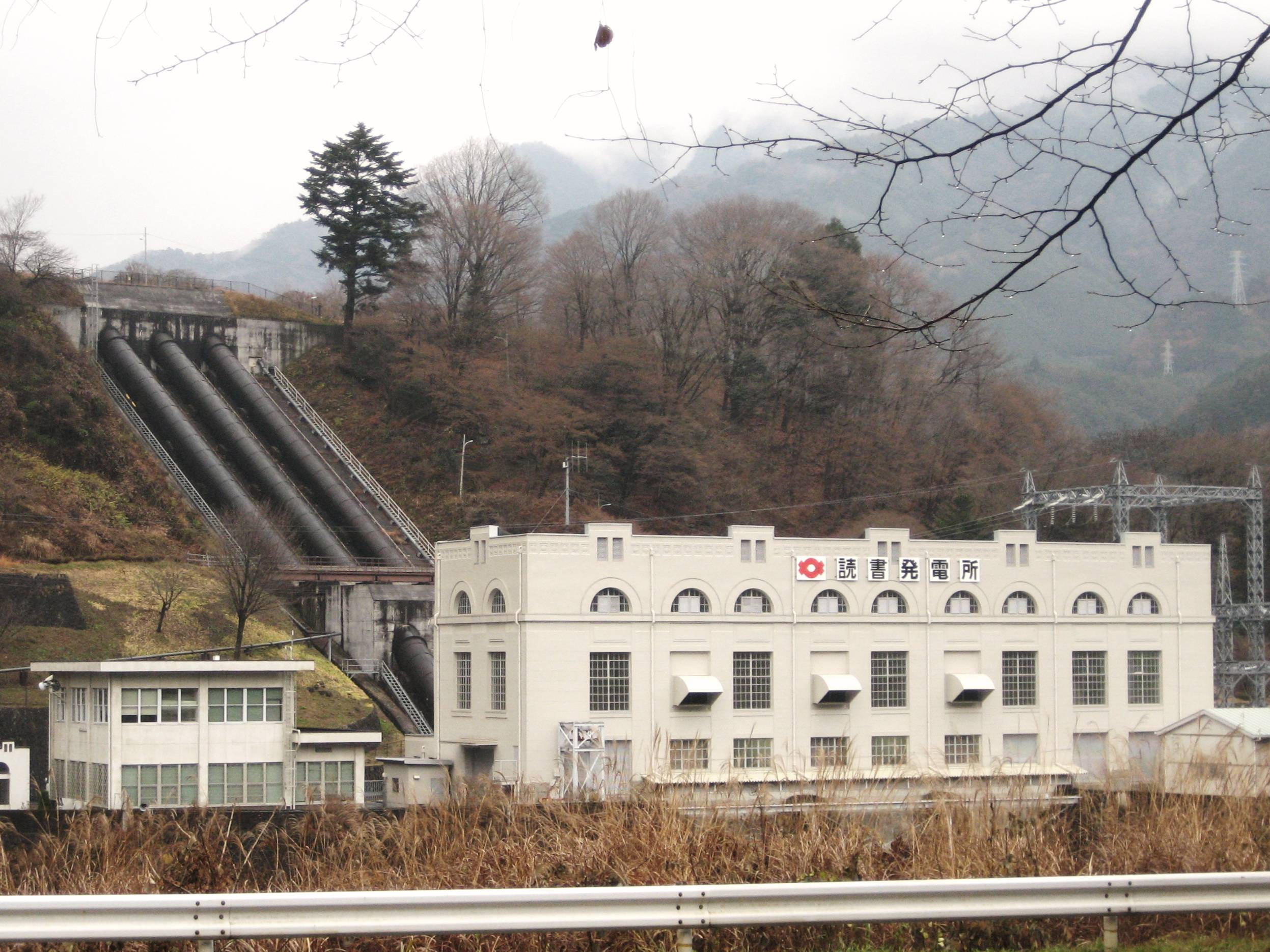
The Yomikaki Power Station in Nagano Prefecture is an important cultural property of Japan

A tangible cultural property (有形文化財, yūkei bunkazai) as defined by the Japanese government's Law for the Protection of Cultural Properties is a part of the cultural properties (Note: In this article, capitals indicate an official designation as opposed to a simple definition, e.g "cultural properties" as opposed to "cultural properties".) of high historical or artistic value such as structures, paintings, sculptures, handicrafts, calligraphic works, ancient books, historic documents, archeological artifacts and other such items created in Japan. (Note: Despite the official definition, some cultural properties of Japan were created in China, Korea or other countries. See for example the Letter from Duarte de Menezez to Toyotomi Hideyoshi, a National Treasure, pictured below and made in India.) All objects which are not structures are called "works of fine arts and crafts.

Considered by the Japanese government to be, like all cultural properties, a precious legacy of the Japanese people, they are protected in various ways, and their export is either controlled or forbidden.

Tangible cultural properties can be designated or registered. The two terms imply different terms of protection under the law.

== Designated tangible cultural properties ==
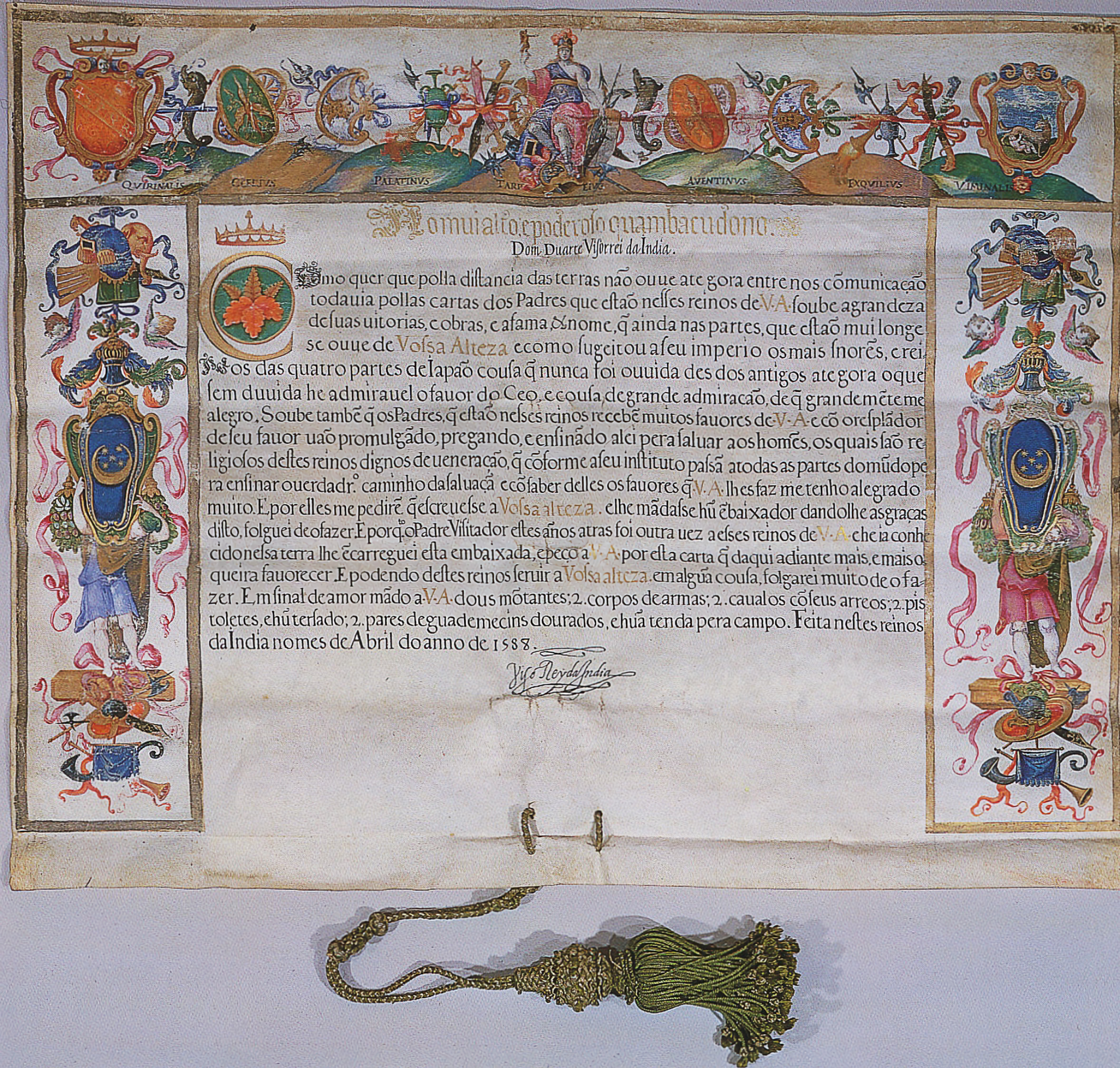
Letter from Duarte de Menezes, viceroy of Portuguese India, to daimyō Toyotomi Hideyoshi, a National Treasure

To protect Japan's cultural heritage, the country's government has established with the Law for the Protection of Cultural Properties a "designation system" (指定制度, shitei seido) under which it selects important items and designates them as cultural properties, imposing restrictions to their alteration, repair and export.

The law then categorizes cultural properties according to their characteristics. Concrete items of high historical or artistic value such as structures, paintings, sculptures, handicrafts, calligraphic works, ancient books, historic documents, archeological artifacts and other such items are classified as tangible cultural properties. All objects which are not structures are referred to as "works of fine arts and crafts.

Designated tangible cultural properties can then, if they satisfy certain criteria, be designated either as Important Cultural Properties of Japan (重要文化財, jūyō bunkazai) (Note: The term is often shortened into just jūbun (重文).) or as national treasures (国宝, kokuhō), in the case of especially valuable items.

The designation can take place at a city (市定重要文化財, shijō jūyō bunkazai; city designated important cultural property), prefectural (県定重要文化財, kenjō jūyō bunkazai; prefecturally designated important cultural property) or national (国定重要文化財, kokutei jūyō bunkazai; nationally designated important cultural property) level. (In this last case the designating agency is often not specified.) Designations of different level can coexist. For example, Sankei-en, a traditional Japanese-style garden in Naka Ward, Yokohama, owns both city designated and nationally designated important cultural properties.

As of April 2009, 2344 sites (including 214 national treasures) and 4272 structures (including 262 national treasures) have been designated tangible cultural properties.

Any alteration to important cultural properties and national treasures requires governmental permission. Conservation work is performed by an item's owner, with financial support available for large expenses. Because many items are made of wood, bark and other flammable materials, they are often extremely susceptible to fires. Owners are therefore given subsidies to install fire and other disaster prevention systems.

In the "works of fine arts and crafts" sector, as of April 2009, (Note: The number between brackets represents National Treasures, included in the total.) 1956 paintings (157), 2628 sculptures (126), 2415 artifacts (252), 1865 calligraphic works and old books (223), 726 ancient texts (59), 567 archeological items (43) and 154 historical items (2) were designated important cultural properties or National Treasures.

Any intervention on this type of cultural property requires previous approval and their exportation is forbidden, except when authorized. The National Treasury supports the conservation and restoration of these items, and the Commissioner for Cultural Affairs provides technical assistance for their administration, restoration, public display and other activities.

== Registered tangible cultural properties ==
Besides the designation system there exists a "registration system" (登録制度), which guarantees a lower level of protection and support. So far there this category includes 7407 buildings and nine works of fine arts and crafts.

Compared to designated important cultural properties and national treasures, registered tangible cultural properties (登録有形文化財) entail fewer responsibilities for the owner. Loss, damage, change of ownership and intended changes that affect more than 25 percent of the visible surface need to be announced. On the other hand, the owner is eligible for low interest loans for maintenance and repairs, subsidies for an architect and tax reductions of up to 50 percent. This new protection level is based on notification, guidance, and advice, and aims at voluntary protection of cultural properties by their owners.

== See also ==
- Cultural Properties of Japan
- Historic Monuments of Ancient Kyoto (Kyoto, Uji and Otsu Cities)
- Lists of Cultural Properties of the Philippines
- Lists of National Treasures of Japan
