= Kōge Station =

Railway station in Yazu, Tottori Prefecture, Japan

Kōge Station 郡家駅
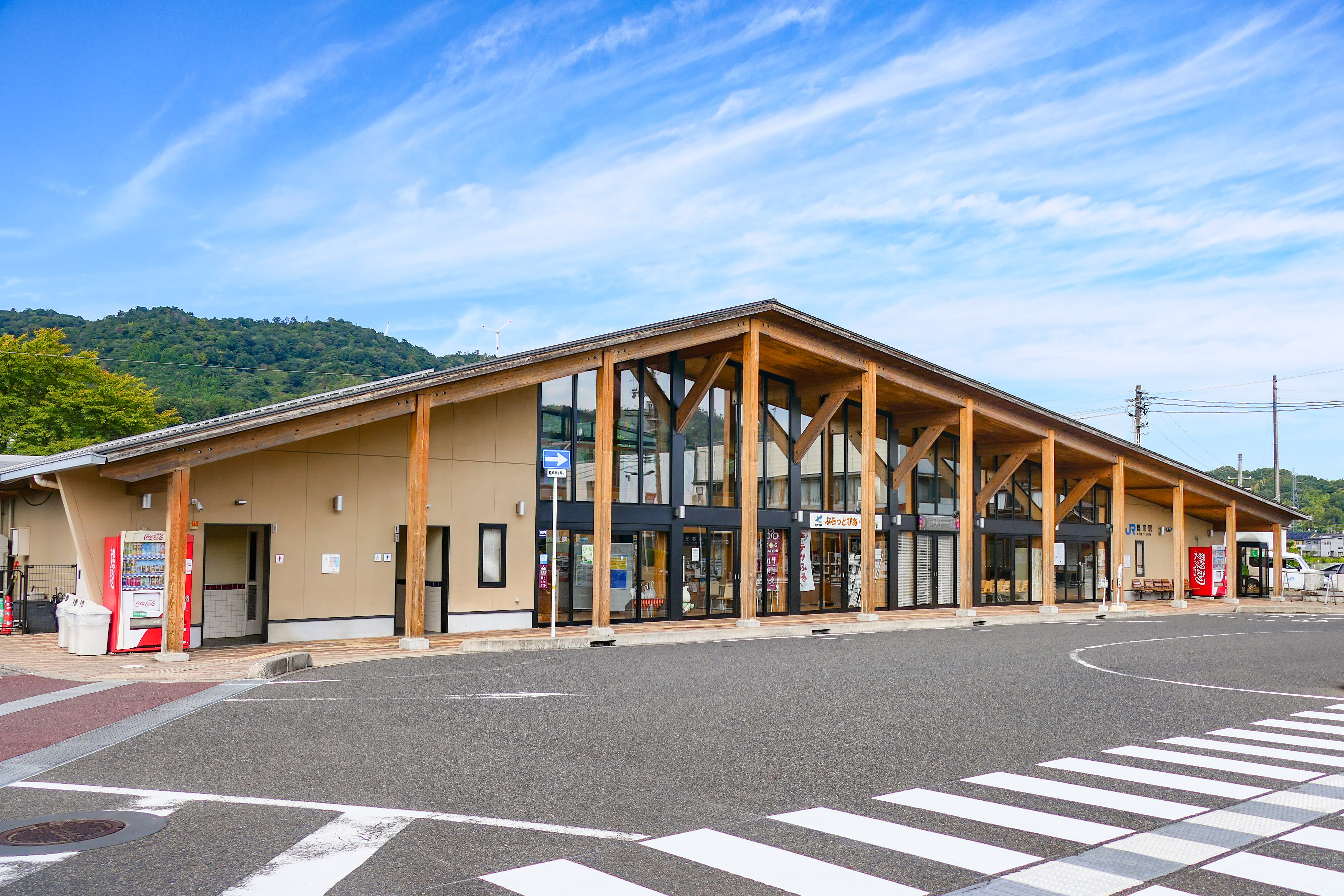
- Kōge Station, 2025

General information
- Location: Kōge, Yazu-cho, Yazu-gun, Tottori-ken680-0461; Japan
- Coordinates: 35°24′47.69″N 134°15′4.72″E
- Owner: JR West
- Operator: JR West; Wakasa Railway
- Lines: Inbi Line; ■ Wakasa Railway Wakasa Line
- Distance: 10.3 km (6.4 miles) from Tottori
- Platforms: 1 island + 1 side platform
- Connections: Bus stop

Other information
- Status: Staffed
- Website: Official website

History
- Opened: 20 December 1919
Location
- Location within Tottori Prefecture Location within Japan

Kōge Station (郡家駅, Kōge-eki) is a junction passenger railway station located in the town of Yazu, Yazu District, Tottori Prefecture, Japan. It is operated by the West Japan Railway Company (JR West) and the third sector company Wakasa Railway.

== Lines ==
Kōge Station is served by the Inbi Line, and is located 10.3 kilometers from the terminus of the line at Tottori. It is also the terminus of the 19.2 kilometer Wakasa Line on the Wakasa Railway to Wakasa Station.

== Station layout ==
The station consists of one ground-level island platform (Platform 1 and 2) is on the side of the station building, and the single side platform (Platform 3) is on the opposite side of the station building connected by a level crossing. The current station building was built together with community facilities in March 2015,

=== Platforms ===
1	■ Wakasa Line	for Wakasa
1	■ Inbi Line	for Tottori
2	■ Inbi Line	for Chizu, Tsuyama, Osaka; Tottori
2	■ Wakasa Line	for Wakasa
3	■ Inbi Line	for Tottori

== Adjacent stations ==
«	Service	»
JR West Inbi Line
Tottori	Limited Express Super Hakuto	Chizu
Tottori	Limited Express Super Inaba	Chizu
Higashi-Kōge	Local	Kawahara
Wakasa Railway Wakasa Line
Terminus	Local	Yazu-Kōkō-mae

== History ==
Kōge Station opened on 20 December 1919. The Wakasa Line began operations 20 January 1930. With the privatization of the Japan National Railways (JNR) on 1 April 1987, the station came under the aegis of the West Japan Railway Company.

== Surrounding area ==
- Yazu Town Hall
- Tottori Prefecture Yazu Government Office
- Yazu Junior High School

== See also ==
- List of railway stations in Japan
