= Miho (disambiguation) =

Miho is a Japanese feminine given name.

Miho may also refer to:

- Miho (Croatian name), a Croatian given name

== People with the surname ==
- Jun Miho (美保 純, Miho Jun, born 1960), Japanese actress
- Tomoko Miho (1931-2012), Japanese-American graphic designer
- Miklós Mihó (born 1913), Hungarian rower

== Places ==
- Miho, Ibaraki (美浦村, Miho-mura), village in Ibaraki Prefecture, Japan
- 4806 Miho, the asteroid Miho, an asteroid in the Asteroid Belt, the 4806th asteroid registered

=== Geography ===
- Cape Miho, Queen Maud Land, Antarctica
- Miho River (Korean: 미호강 / 美湖江), a tributary of the Geum River in South Korea
- Miho Bay (美保湾, Miho-wan), a bay on the Sea of Japan in Tottori Prefecture, Japan

=== Facilities and structures ===
- Miho Museum (ミホ ミュージアム, Miho myūjiamu), in Shiga Prefecture, Japan
- Miho Shrine (美保神社, Miho Jinja)), a Shinto shrine in Matsue, Shimane Prefecture, Japan
- Miho Dam (三保ダム, Miho damu), a dam on the Kawauchi River in Kanagawa Prefecture, Japan
- Miho-Yonago Airport (美保飛行場, sometimes referred to as Yonago Airport), in Tottori Prefecture, Japan; including Miho Airbase
- Miho no Matsubara (三保の松原), a National Place of Scenic Beauty in Shizuoka Prefecture, Japan

== Other uses ==
- Miho: Journey to the Mountain (album), a 2010 album by Paul Winter Consort

== See also ==
- Miyo
- Mijo (disambiguation)
- Mio (disambiguation)
