= Mijo =

Mijo may refer to:

== People ==
- Mijo Babić (1903–1941), Croatian fascist
- Mijo Caktaš (born 1992), Croatian football player
- Mijo Dadić (born 1981), Croatian football player
- Mijo Gorski (born 1952), Croatian Roman Catholic prelate
- Mijo Kovačić (1935-2026), Croatian painter and naïve artist
- Mijo Lončarić (1941–2023), Croatian linguist
- Mijo Mihaljčić (born 1992), Serbian fashion model
- Mijo Miletic (born 1998), Bosnian-Herzegovinian football player
- Mijo Studenović (born 1985), Bosnian-Herzegovinian football defender
- Mijo Tunjić (born 1988), Dutch football player
- Mijo Udovčić (1920–1984), Yugoslavian chess player

== Other ==
- "Mijo" (Better Call Saul), an episode of the television series Better Call Saul
- Mijo, a Spanish term of endearment; see Colombian Spanish § Common expressions

== See also ==
- Mijoo
- Miyo
- Miho (disambiguation)
- Mio (disambiguation)
