= List of cultural properties of Nichinan, Tottori =

This list is of the cultural properties of Japan located within the town of Nichinan in Tottori Prefecture.

== Statistics ==
As of 18 March 2010, 14 Properties have been designated and a further 2 Properties registered.

Cultural Properties of Japan		National	Prefectural	Municipal	Total
Designated Cultural Properties
Tangible	Structures		1		1
Tangible	Paintings				
Tangible	Sculptures		1		1
Tangible	Applied Crafts				
Tangible	Calligraphic works Classical books				
Tangible	Ancient documents				
Tangible	Archeological artefacts				
Tangible	Historic materials			1	1
Intangible					
Folk	Tangible				
Folk	Intangible		1	2	3
Monuments	Historic Sites				
Monuments	Places of Scenic Beauty				
Monuments	Natural Monuments	(*1)2	4	2	8
Cultural Landscapes					
Preservation Districts					
Conservation Techniques					
Total		2	7	5	14
Registered Cultural Properties
Tangible	Structures	2			2
Tangible	Works of Art or Craft				
Folk Tangible					
Monuments	Historic Sites				
Monuments	Places of Scenic Beauty				
Monuments	Natural Monuments				
Total		2			2

† One Special Natural Monument (denoted with an asterisk, smaller text, and brackets) is included within the count of Natural Monuments.

== Designated Cultural Properties ==
Property	Owner	Date	No. of Assets	Comments	Image	Coordinates	Type	Level	Ref.
*Japanese Giant Salamander オオサンショウウオ; Ōsanshōuo			1	designation shared across eleven prefectures			Special Natural Monuments	National	
Mount Sentsū Japanese Yew 船通山のイチイ; Sentsū-zan no ichii			1			35°09′19″N 133°10′46″E	Natural Monuments	National	
Kami-Iwami Ginkgos 上石見のオハツキ・タイコイチョ ウ Kami-Iwami no ohatsuki-taikoichō			1			35°06′52″N 133°21′18″E	Natural Monuments	Prefectural	
Gedatsu-ji Momi Firs 解脱寺のモミ並木; Gedatsuji no momi-namiki	Gedatsu-ji		1			35°12′55″N 133°12′28″E	Natural Monuments	Prefectural	
Sasafuku Jinja Shrine Forest 楽楽福神社社叢; Sasafuku Jinja shasō	Sasafuku Jinja		1			35°14′25″N 133°16′14″E	Natural Monuments	Prefectural	
Kadonokami Japanese Alder Marshland Forest 神戸上ハンノキ沼沢林; Kadonokami no hannoki shōtaku-rin			1			35°08′16″N 133°22′40″E	Natural Monuments	Prefectural	
Inga Hōkyōintō 印賀宝篋印塔; Inga hōkyōintō		early Kamakura period 1357	1			35°13′56″N 133°16′37″E	Structures	Prefectural	
Standing Wooden Statue of Jūichimen Kannon 十一面観音立像 jūichimen Kannon ryūzō	Ryūsen-ji	late Heian period	1			35°06′59″N 133°21′42″E	Sculptures	Prefectural	
Nichinan Kashira Uchi 日南のかしら打ち; Nichinan no kashira uchi			1	shrine entertainment with taiko accompaniment, for family security; 1–2 November			Folk Intangible	Prefectural	
Ō-Iwami Jinja Shrine Forest 大石見神社社叢; Ō-Iwami Jinja shasō	Ō-Iwami Jinja		1			35°06′48″N 133°21′20″E	Natural Monuments	Municipal	
Tarisō Nodules 多里層の団塊(ノジュール)群; Tarisō no dankai (nojūru)-gun			1			35°06′45″N 133°12′09″E	Natural Monuments	Municipal	
Sekibō 石棒 sekibō	Nichinan Art Museum		1	sekibō are phallic stone rods		35°09′50″N 133°18′24″E	Historic Materials	Municipal	
Kamisakae Mochi-making and Mochi-making Song 上三栄のもちつきともちつき唄; Kamisakae no mochi-tsuki to michi-tsuki uta			1				Folk Intangible	Municipal	
Nichinan Kagura 日南神楽; Nichinan kagura			1				Folk Intangible	Municipal	

== Registered Cultural Properties ==
Property	Owner	Date	No. of Assets	Comments	Image	Coordinates	Type	Level	Ref.
Miyamoto Family Residence Main Building 宮本家住宅主屋; Miyamoto-ke jūtaku shuoku		Taishō/Shōwa period (1913-1927)	1			35°13′42″N 133°19′04″E	Structures	National	
Miyamoto Family Residence Storehouse 宮本家住宅土蔵; Miyamoto-ke jūtaku dozō		Meiji period (1875-1904)	1			35°13′42″N 133°19′04″E	Structures	National	

== See also ==
- Cultural Properties of Japan
- Hiba-Dōgo-Taishaku Quasi-National Park
