= Aoki Site =

Yayoi period settlement trace in Yonago, Tottori, Japan

Aoki site
- 青木遺跡 (Japanese)
- Aoki site Aoki Site (Japan)
- 35°23′54.7″N 133°22′0.9″E
- Type: Settlement trace
- Periods: Yayoi - Nara period
- Location: Yonago, Tottori, Japan
- Region: San'in region

History
- Built: 3rd century

Site notes
- Public access: Yes (park)
- National Historic Site of Japan

The Aoki Site (青木遺跡, Aoki iseki) is an archaeological site with the traces of a late-Yayoi period (3rd century) to early-Nara period (6th century) settlement located in the Nagae neighborhood of the city of Yonago, Tottori Prefecture, in the San'in region of Japan. It was designated a National Historic Site in 1978.

== Overview ==
The Aoki Site is a composite ruin centered on the remains of a settlement which existed from the mid-Yayoi period into the Nara period. It is located on the Aoki Hills at the northern end of the "Chojabaru Plateau", on the left bank of the Hino River. The area has long been known to be the location of many ancient burial mounds but came to academic notice only in 1971 when rescue archaeology prior to development of the site into a public residential housing complex found approximately 130 pit dwelling sites and 240 pillar-supported building foundations, many remains of burial mounds, square grooved tombs, underground storage pits. In addition, tens of thousands of artifacts such as Yayoi pottery, metalware, stone tools, jade magatama and other beads, and other daily utensils, as well as grave goods, were unearthed over a 40 hectare area. The large amount of earthenware enabled a detailed chronological evaluation of the site. Despite the academic importance of the site, it was mostly destroyed as construction of the housing complex was allowed to be completed after the archaeological excavation was completed in 1977, and only a small portion was preserved as a park.

The site is adjacent to the Fukuichi Site, also a National Historic Site, and many artifacts from both sites are preserved and displayed at the Fukuichi Archaeological Museum (福市考古資料館) The site is 15 minutes by car from JR West Yonago Station.

== See also ==
- List of Historic Sites of Japan (Tottori)
