= Miho =

- Pronunciation: Japanese: [miho]
- Gender: Feminine

Origin
- Origin: Japanese
- Meaning: ear of rice, truth, beauty, care, future step, sail, walk
- Region of origin: Japanese

Other names
- Related names: Mihoko

Miho (美穂, 美保, 美帆, 美歩, みほ, ミホ) is a feminine Japanese given name. It can have many different meanings in Japanese depending on the kanji used.

== Possible Japanese writings ==
Miho can be written using different kanji characters and can mean:

- 実穂, "truth, ear of grain"
- 美穂, "beauty, ear of grain"
- 美保, "beauty, care"
- 未歩, "future (part of the word 未来), step"
- 美帆, "beauty, sail"
- 美歩, "beauty, walk"

The name can also be written in hiragana "みほ" or katakana "ミホ".

== People with the name ==
- Miho Adachi (足立 美穂; born 1979), Japanese sprint canoeist
- Miho Arai (荒井 美帆; born 1988), Japanese retired competitor in synchronized swimming
- Miho Arakawa (荒川 美穂; born 1987), Japanese voice actress
- Miho Dukov (Михо Дуков, born 1955), former Bulgarian wrestler
- Miho Fujii (藤井 美穂), Japanese actress, comedian, and model
- Miho Fujima (藤真 美穂; born 1978), Japanese actress
- Miho Fukuhara (福原 美穂; born 1987), Japanese singer
- Miho Fukumoto (福元 美穂; born 1983), Japanese football player
- Miho Hamada (濱田 美穂), Japanese table tennis player
- Miho Hamaguchi (浜口 ミホ; 1915–1988), Japanese architect
- Miho Hashiguchi (橋口 美穂; born 1977), Japanese gymnast
- Miho Hatori (羽鳥 美保; born 1970), Japanese singer and songwriter
- Miho Hazama (挾間 美帆; born 1986), Japanese composer and jazz musician
- Miho Igarashi (五十嵐 未帆; born 1997), Japanese freestyle wrestler
- Miho Imada (今田 美穂; born 1962), Japanese sake brewmaster
- Miho Imai (今井 美穂; born 1987), Japanese cyclist
- Miho Iwata (born 1962), Japanese performance artist, scenographer and choreographer
- Miho Kajioka (born 1973), Japanese photographer
- Miho Kamogawa (鴨川 実歩; born 1997), Japanese professional footballer
- Miho Kaneda (金田 美保), former Japanese football player
- Miho Kanno (菅野 美穂; born 1977), Japanese actress and J-pop singer
- Miho Kanno (cricketer) (菅野 美保; born 1990), Japanese cricketer
- Miho Karasawa (唐沢 美帆; born 1983), Japanese J-pop singer
- Miho Kawabe (河邉 美穂; born 1974), Japanese former synchronized swimmer
- Miho Komatsu (小松 未歩; born 1974), former Japanese pop singer-songwriter
- Miho Konishi (小西 美帆; born 1977), Japanese actress
- Miho Kuramochi (倉持 美穂; born 1998), Japanese tennis player
- Miho Manya (万屋 美穂; born 1996), Japanese football player
- Miho Matsuoka (松岡 美保; born 1953), Japanese women's basketball player
- Miho Minei (嶺井 美穂, born 1997), Japanese judoka
- Miho Miyahara (宮原 美穂, born 1996), Japanese karateka
- Miho Miyazaki (宮崎 美穂, born 1993), Japanese idol singer, AKB48 member
- Miho Morikawa (森川美穂; born 1968), Japanese singer and model
- Miho Mosulishvili (მიხო მოსულიშვილი, born 1962), Georgian writer and playwright
- Miho Murata (村田 美穂; born 1970), retired Japanese volleyball player
- Miho Nakata (born 1989), Japanese ultramarathon runner
- Miho Nakayama (中山 美穂; 1970–2024), Japanese actress, model, and J-pop idol singer
- Miho Nakayama (comedian) (中山 美保; 1938–2017), Japanese comedian
- Miho Ninomiya (二宮 美穂; born 1975), Japanese female judoka
- Miho Nishida (born 1992), Filipino-born Japanese actress
- Miho Nonaka (野中 生萌; born 1997), Japanese climber
- Miho Obana (小花 美穂; born 1970), Japanese shōjo manga artist
- Miho Ohwada (大和田 美帆; born 1983), Japanese actress
- Miho Okasaki (岡咲 美保; born 1998), Japanese voice actress
- Miho Oki (沖 美穂; born 1974), Japanese former women's racing cyclist
- Miho Otani (大谷 三穂; born 1971), Japanese military officer
- Miho Saeki (佐伯 美穂; born 1976), Japanese former tennis player
- Miho Sato (佐藤 美保; born 1978), Japanese retired athlete
- Miho Shingu (新宮 美歩; born 1991), Japanese track and field athlete
- Miho Shinoda (信田 美帆; born 1972), Japanese former gymnast and singer
- Miho Shiraishi (白石 美帆; born 1978), Japanese actress
- Miho Shishiuchi (獅子内 美帆; born 1992), Japanese ice hockey player
- Miho Takagi (actress) (高木 美保; born 1962), Japanese actress and essayist
- Miho Takagi (speed skater) (高木 美帆; born 1994), Japanese speed skater
- Miho Takai (高井 美穂; born 1971), Japanese politician
- Miho Takahashi (高橋 美帆; born 1992), Japanese swimmer
- Miho Tanaka (badminton) (田中 美保; born 1976), Japanese badminton player
- Miho Tanaka (model) (田中 美保; born 1983), Japanese model, entertainer, and actress
- Miho Teramura (寺村 美穂; born 1994), Japanese swimmer
- Miho Wada (born 1979), Japanese-born jazz musician from New Zealand
- Miho Wakizawa (脇沢 美穂; born 1979), Japanese retired professional wrestler
- Miho Watanabe (渡邉 美穂; born 2000), one of the members of Japanese idol group Hinatazaka46
- Miho Wataya (渡谷 美帆), Japanese voice actress
- Miho Yabe (矢部 美穂; born 1977), Japanese model and J-pop idol singer
- Miho Yamada (山田 美穂; born 1973), Japanese voice actress
- Miho Yamada (gymnast) (山田 海蜂; born 1973), Japanese rhythmic gymnast
- Miho Yoshikawa (吉川 美穂; born 1993), Japanese cyclist
- Miho Yoshimura (吉村 美穂; born 1997), Japanese fencer
- Miho Yoshioka (吉岡 美帆; born 1990), Japanese competitive sailor
- Miho Yoshioka (tarento) (吉岡 美穂; born 1980), Japanese tarento, actress and former gravure idol

== Fictional characters ==
- Miho, female lead of the anime Fancy Lala
- Miho, a character from the Saint Seiya manga/anime
- Miho, a character from the graphic novel series Sin City
- Miho, a character from the video game Vainglory
- Miho Amakata, a character from Free!
- Miho Azuki, a character from the manga/anime series Bakuman
- Miho Karasuma, a character from Witch Hunter Robin
- Miho Kirishima, Kamen Rider Femme from the tokusatsu TV series Kamen Rider Ryuki
- Miho Kohinata, a character from The Idolmaster Cinderella Girls
- Miho Maruyama, a character from Ojamajo Doremi
- Miho Mukai, a character from Noein
- Miho Nishizumi, a character from Girls und Panzer
- Miho Nosaka, a character from the manga/anime series Yu-Gi-Oh!
- Miho Odagiri, a character from Hot Gimmick
- Miho Segawa, a character from Ojamajo Doremi
- Miho Shinjo, a character from the videogame Front Mission 3
- Miho Tohya, a character from Megatokyo
- Miho, a monster in the popular mobile game Summoners War.
