= Mihaljčić =

Mihaljčić (Serbian Cyrillic: Михаљчић) is a Serbian surname. Notable people with the name include:

- Mijo Mihaljčić (born 1992), Serbian model
- Rade Mihaljčić (1937–2020), Serbian historian and academic
