= Mount Dōgo =

Volcano in Japan

- 道後山
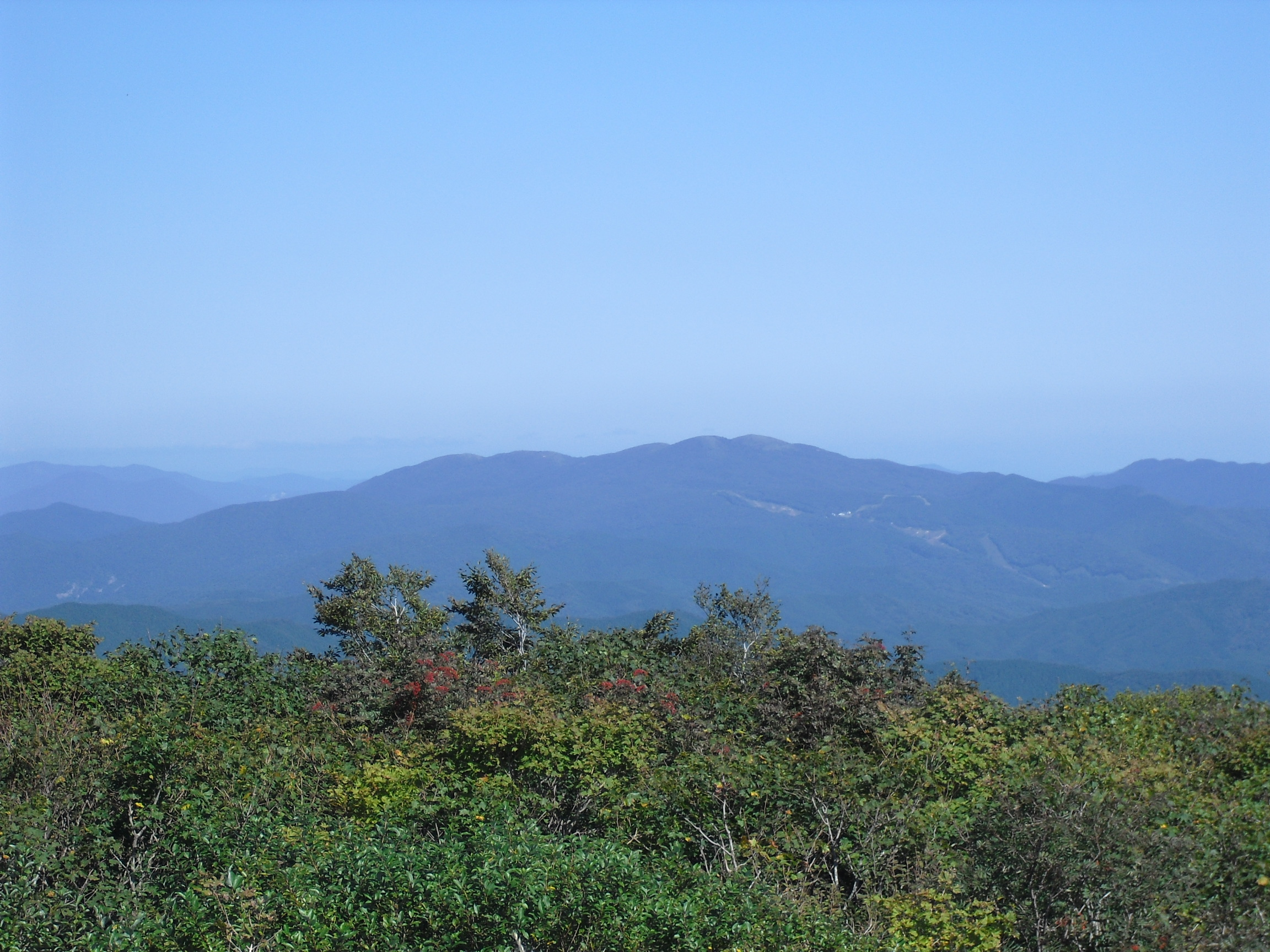
- Mount Dōgo

Highest point
- Elevation: 1,268 m (4,160 ft)
- Coordinates: 35°04′12″N 133°14′09″E

Naming
- Language of name: Japanese

Geography
- Location within Japan
- Location: Hiroshima Prefecture and Tottori Prefecture, Japan
- Parent range: Chūgoku Mountains

Climbing
- Easiest route: Hiking

Mount Dōgo (道後山, Dōgo-yama), is a volcanic mountain located on the border of Nichinan, Tottori Prefecture and Shōbara, Hiroshima Prefecture. The mountain has an elevation of 1,268 m (4,160 ft). The name of Mount Dōgo in Japanese is formed from two kanji. The first, 道, means "road" and the second, 後, in this context means "behind" or "to the rear". Due to its scenery mountain is known as the "Queen of the Chūgoku Mountains."

== Geography ==
Mount Dōgo is part of Hiba-Dogo-Taishaku Quasi-National Park, and is the second largest mountain in the park after Mount Hiba. Mount Dōgo offers a clear view of Mount Hiba to the west and Daisen and the Japan Sea to the north. On clear days the Shimane Peninsula is also visible from the mountain. The Nariwa River, a prominent tributary of the Takahashi River, originates at Mount Dōgo. The border of Tottori Prefecture and Hiroshima Prefecture is marked by a low 1,268 m (4,160 ft) long stone wall.

== Alpine plain ==
High-elevation flatlands, particularly the broad area known as Noro on the Hiroshima Prefecture side of Mount Dōgo. The plain is used as pastureland for dairy farms and cattle. Wagyu cattle are farmed in this area.

== Flora ==
=== Trees ===
Mount Dōgo features outstanding examples of numerous trees, including the:

- Shiba chestnut
- Oak
- Kousa dogwood

=== Alpine plants ===
Higher elevations of Mount Dōgo feature alpine plants. Warabi (Pteridium aquilinum), a bracken fern used in Japanese cuisine, are collected in early spring around Mount Dōgo.

=== Flowers ===
Mount Dōgo is known for its various species of flowers.

- Forested areas of Mount Dōgo are home large clusters of the Rhododendron kaempferito species of rhododendron.
- Taniutsuji (Weigela hortensis), a deciduous shrub of the honeysuckle family flowers in late spring.
- Rengetsutsuji (Rhododendron japonicum), known as the Japanese azalea, blanket Mount Dōgo in June.
- Lily of the valley (Convallaria keiskei) is found in the area around Dōgo Kogen Kuro Park in Shōbara, Hiroshima Prefecture.

== Japanese giant salamander ==
Mount Dōgo is one of the remaining homes of the Japanese giant salamander (Andrias japonicus), the second largest salamander species in the world. The species, endemic to Japan, is closely related to the Chinese giant salamander and reaches a length of 1.5 m (5 ft). The Japanese giant salamander, while protected by the Japanese government since 1952, is considered near threatened by the IUCN.

== Hiking and ski resort ==
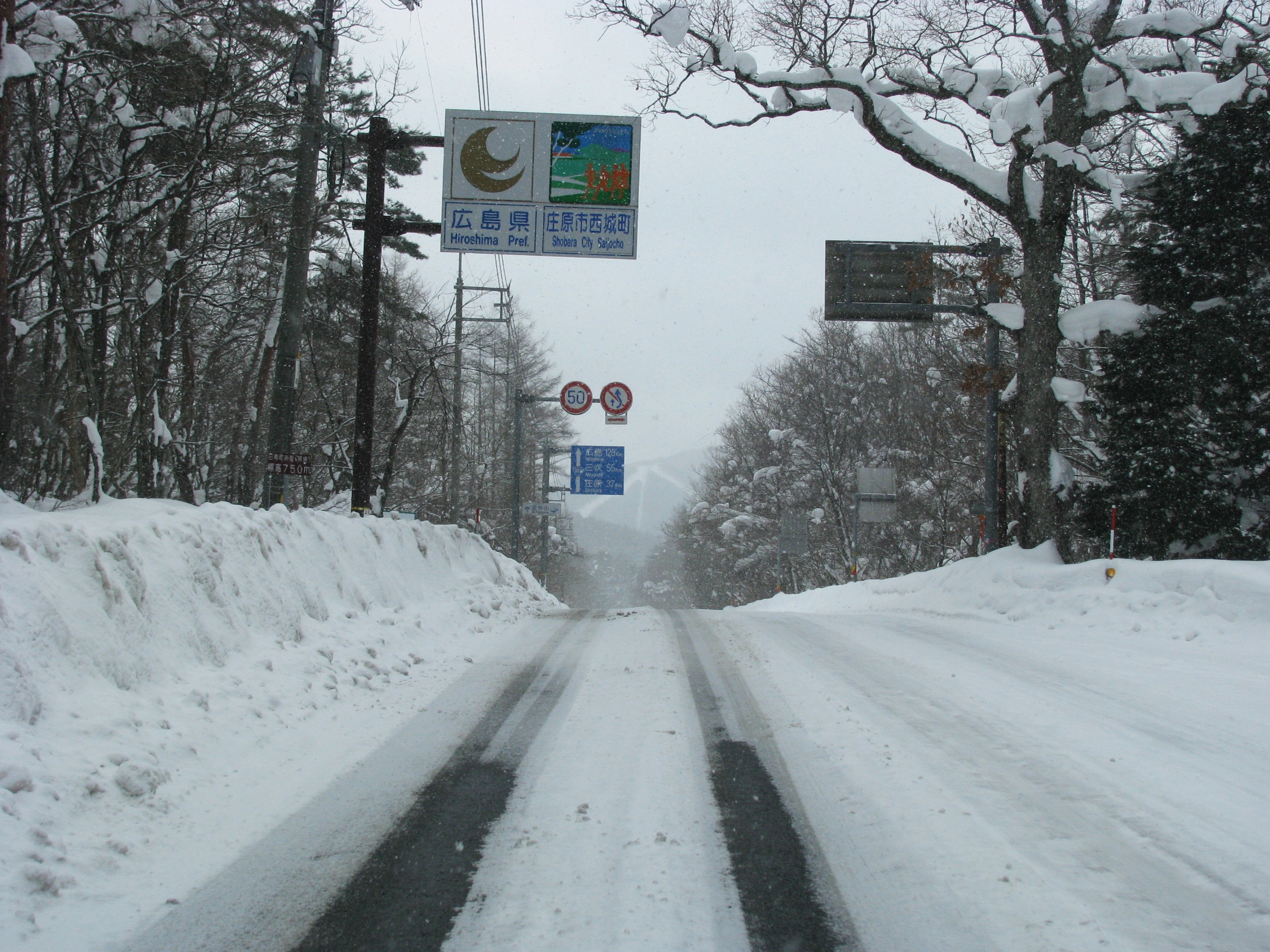
Japan National Route 183 to the east of Mount Dōgo

=== Hiking ===
Mount Dōgo can be accessed on the Hiroshima Prefecture side from Dōgoyama Station on the JR West Geibi Line. Access on the Tottori Prefecture side is via Shōyama Station on the JR West Hakubi Line, then by bus to a stop in the Niiya district of Nichinan. From these points the hike to the summit of Mount Dōgo takes approximately three hours. Mount Dōgo is known for its fall foliage.

=== Dōgo Kogen Kuro Park ===
Mount Dōgo is home to Dōgo Kogen Kuro Park (道後山高原クロカンパーク, Dōgoyama Kōgen Pāku). The park, at an elevation of 700 m (2,297 ft), has a broad, flat area 44 times the size of the Tokyo Dome. The recreational facilities of Dōgo Kogen Kuro Park are maintained by the town of Shōbara. Cross country skiing is popular, and the town hosts an annual triathlon in the park. The stadium in the park is home to soccer matches and in-line skating and cycling competitions.

=== Mountain & Ski Resort Dogoyamakogen ===
The Mountain & Ski Resort Dogoyamakogen (道後山高原スキー場, Dōgoyama Kōgen Sukījō) is open from approximately December to March for skiing and snowboarding, and is accessible from the Chūgoku Expressway via Japan National Route 183. The resort features three slopes, as well as a snowboarding and skiing school.
