= Mount Sentsū =

Mountain in the country of Japan

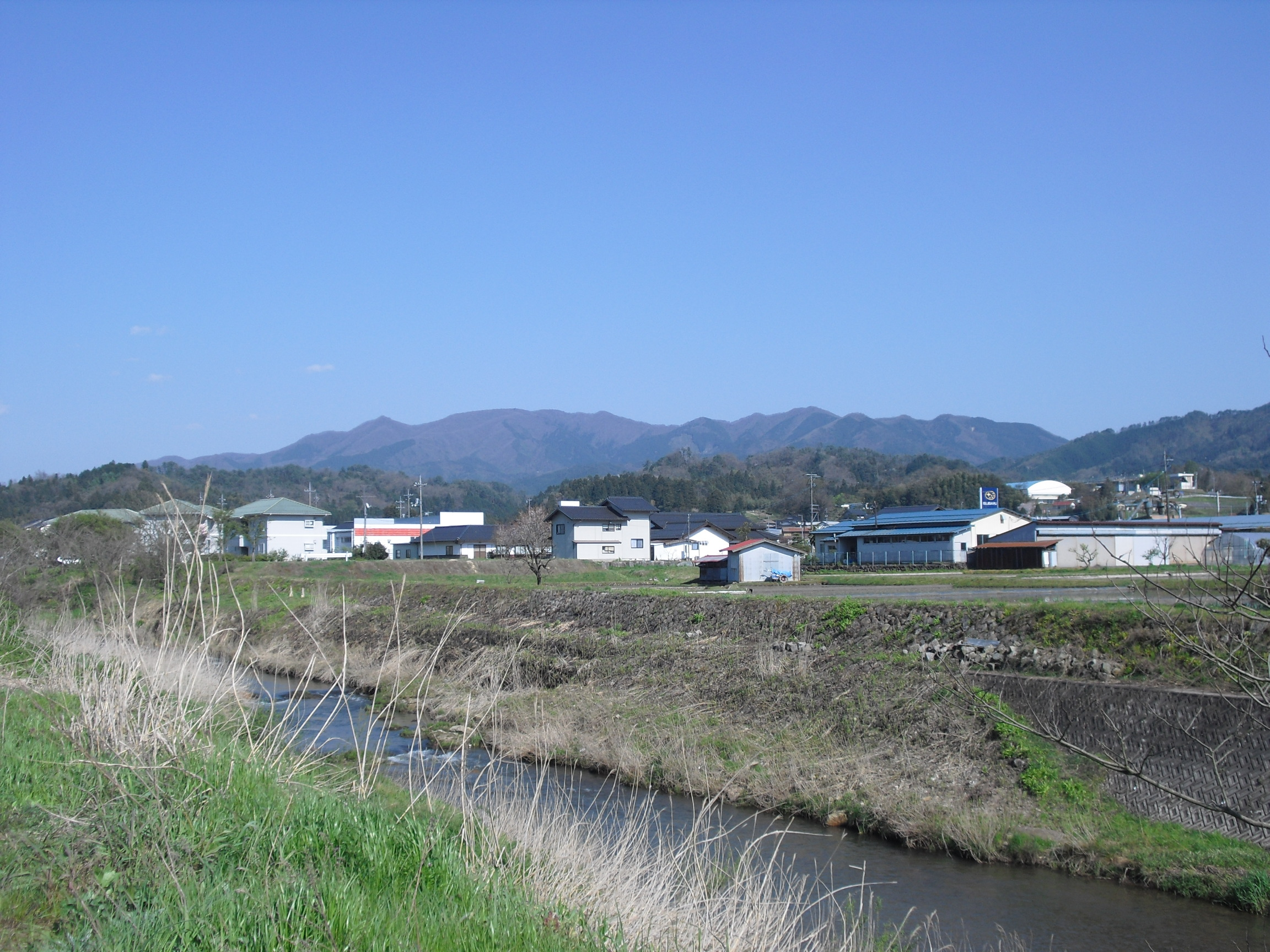
- Mount Sentsū viewed from Yokota, Okuizumo, Shimane Prefecture

Highest point
- Elevation: 1,142 m (3,747 ft)
- Coordinates: 35°09′21″N 133°10′43″E

Naming
- Language of name: Japanese
- Pronunciation: Japanese: [Sentsū-zan]

Geography
- Location within Japan
- Location: Tottori Prefecture and Shimane Prefecture, Japan
- Parent range: Chūgoku Mountains

Climbing
- Easiest route: Hiking

Mount Sentsū (船通山, Sentsū-zan), also known in English as Sentsūzan, is a mountain located on the border of Nichinan, Tottori Prefecture and Okuizumo, Shimane Prefecture, in Japan. Mount Sentsū has an elevation of 1,142 m (3,747 ft) and is one of the highest peaks in the Chūgoku Mountain Range and part of the Hiba-Dogo-Taishaku Quasi-National Park. Mount Sentsū was historically on the border of the ancient provinces of Hōki Province and Izumo Province. The base of Mount Sentsū is primarily composed of granite. This granite is a rich source of iron sand, and the mountain was historically known as a source for this material.

== Etymology ==
The name of Mount Sentsū in Japanese is formed from two kanji. The first, 船, means "boat" and the second, 通 means "to cross".

== Association with Susanoo legend ==
According to the Kojiki, Mount Sentsū is the scene of the legendary battle between Susanoo and Yamata no Orochi. Yamata no Orochi, an 8-headed and 8-tailed Japanese dragon, tormented residents of the Izumo area. Susanoo, the Shinto god of the sea and storms, slew Yamata no Orochi at the foot of Mount Sentsū, and his blood flowed into the Hi River (today known as Hii River). Yamata no Orochi's corpse produced Kusanagi-no-Tsurugi, a Japanese sword and one of three Imperial Regalia of Japan that legitimate the rule of the Emperor. Susanoo then presented the sword to his sister, the Sun Goddess Amaterasu, who passed it to her descendants, the Imperial family of Japan.

== Transportation ==
Mount Sentsū is a popular hiking destination. It is accessible from the Shōyama Station in Nichinan via the JR West Hakubi Line.
