= Kami-Iwami Station =

Railway station in Nichinan, Tottori Prefecture, Japan

Kami-Iwami Station 上石見駅
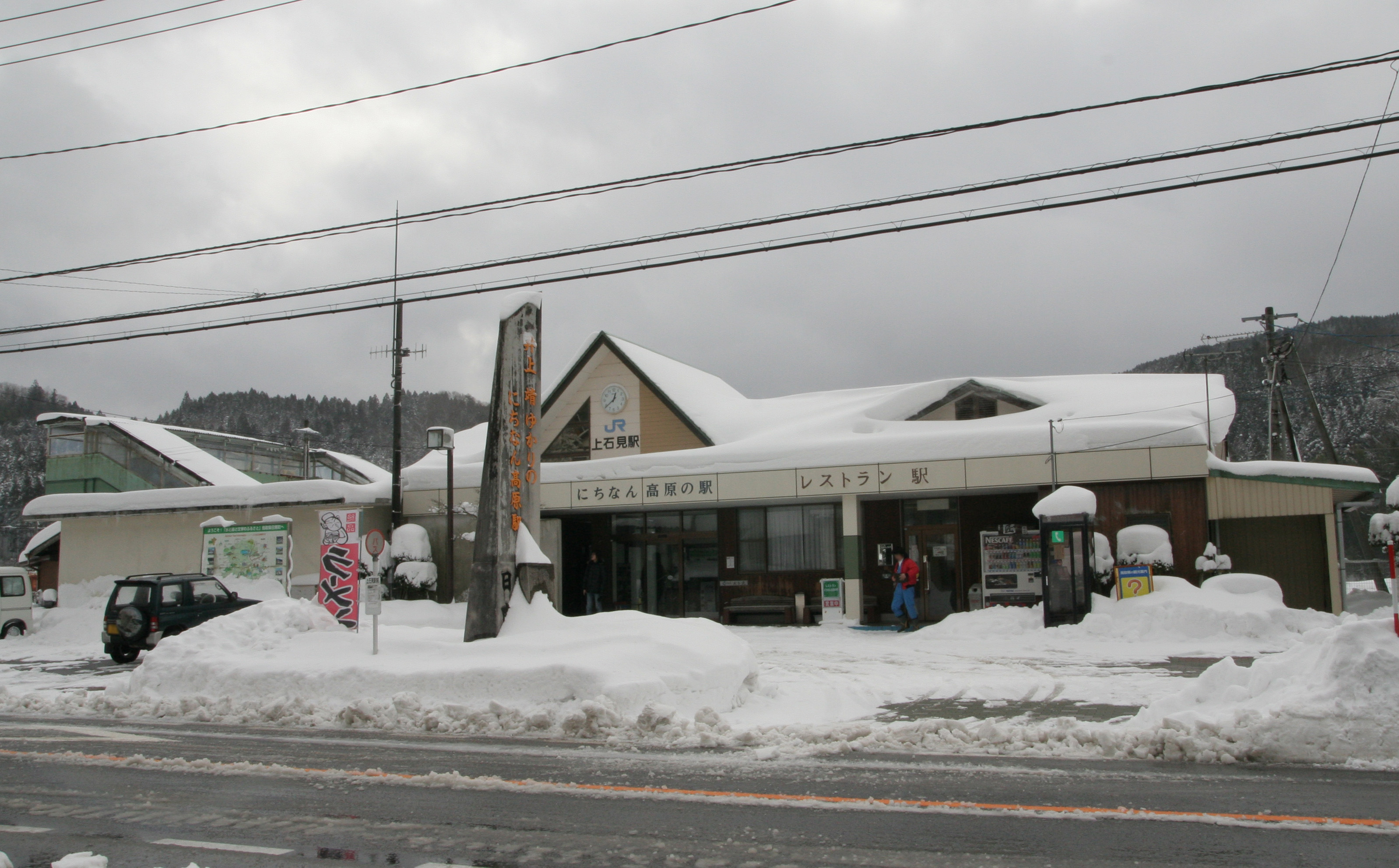
- Kami-Iwami Station building, February 2008

General information
- Location: Nakaiwami, Nichinan-cho, Hino-gun, Tottori-ken 689-5664; Japan
- Coordinates: 35°6′45.01″N 133°21′5.71″E
- Operator: JR West
- Line: Hakubi Line
- Distance: 86.7 km (53.9 miles) from Kurashiki
- Platforms: 1 side + 1 island platform
- Tracks: 3

Construction
- Structure type: At grade

Other information
- Status: Unstaffed
- Website: Official website

History
- Opened: 6 December 1924

Passengers
- 2018: 22 daily
Location
- Location within Tottori Prefecture Location within Japan

Kami-Iwami Station (上石見駅, Kami-Iwami-eki) is a passenger railway station located in the town of Nichinan, Tottori Prefecture, Japan. It is operated by the West Japan Railway Company (JR West).

== Lines ==
Kami-Iwami Station is served by the Hakubi Line, and is located 86.7 kilometers from the terminus of the line at Kurashiki and 102.6 kilometers from Okayama.

== Station layout ==
The station consists of one ground-level side platform and one ground level island platform. The station building is connected with the island platform by a footbridge. The station is unattended.

=== Platforms ===
1	■ Hakubi Line	for Niimi and Okayama
2	■ Hakubi Line	for Yonago
3	■ Hakubi Line	for Niimi and Okayama

== Adjacent stations ==
«	Service	»
Hakubi Line
Niizato	-	Shōyama

== History ==
Kami-Iwami Station opened on December 6, 1924. With the privatization of the Japan National Railways (JNR) on April 1, 1987, the station came under the aegis of the West Japan Railway Company.

== Passenger statistics ==
In fiscal 2018, the station was used by an average of 22 passengers daily.

== Surrounding area ==
- Kamiiwami Post Office
- Tottori Prefectural Road No. 8 Niimi Nichinan Line
- Tottori Prefectural Road No. 211 Inokohara Kamiiwami Station Line

== See also ==
- List of railway stations in Japan
