= Hino River =

River in Japan

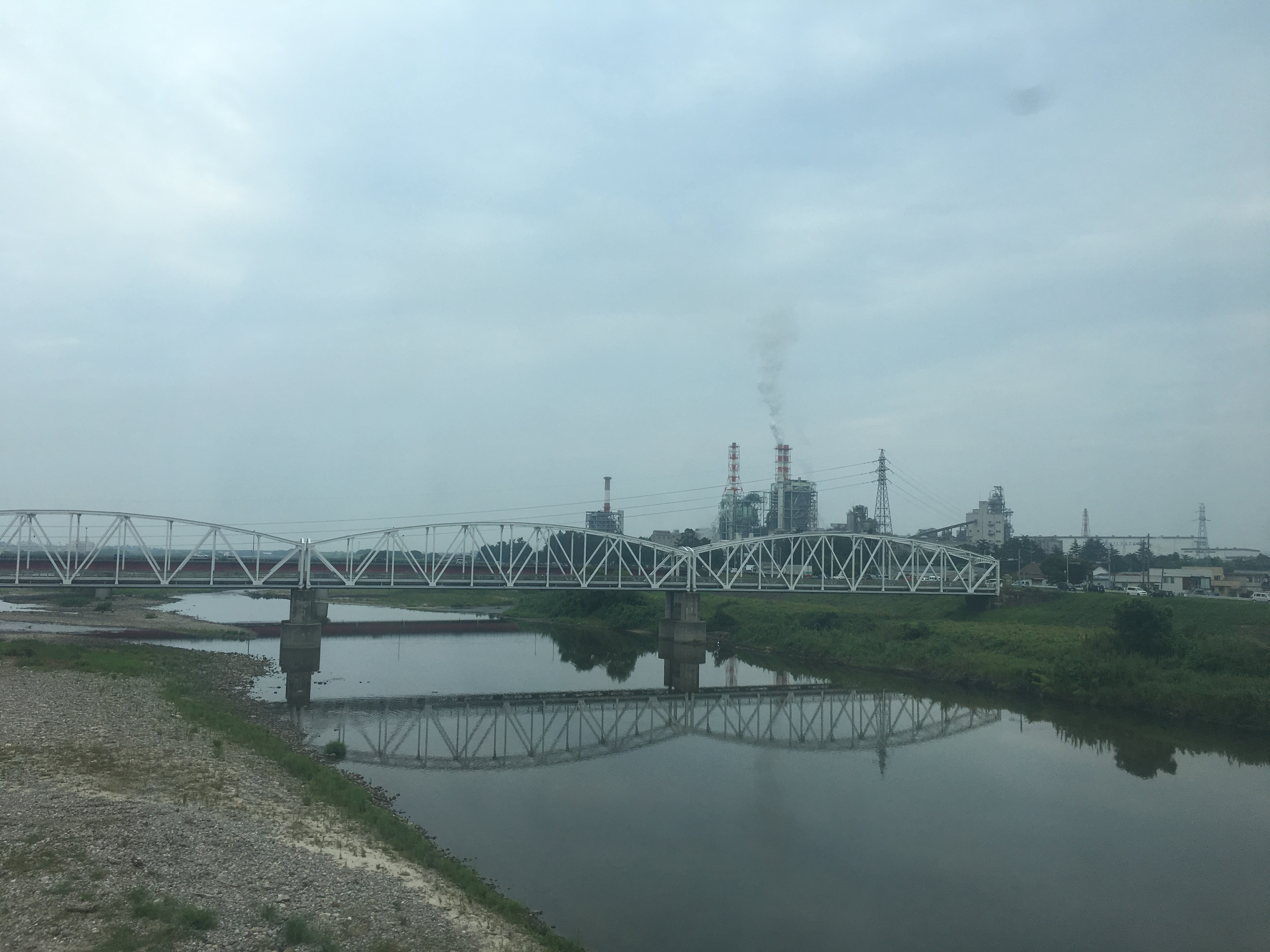
- Hino River near Matsue, Shimane Prefecture

Location
- Country: Japan

Physical characteristics
- Source
  - location: Mount Mikuni and Mount Dōgo, Tottori Prefecture
  - elevation: 1,004 metres (3,294 ft)
- Mouth
  - location: Miho Bay, Sea of Japan
  - elevation: 0 m (0 ft)
- Length: 77 km (48 mi)
- Basin size: 870 km^{2} (340 sq mi)

The Hino River (日野川, Hino-gawa) is a major river in the western part of Tottori Prefecture, located in Honshu. The Class A river flows east-northeast for 77 kilometres (48 mi), and is the longest river in the prefecture. The Hino River emerges from the Chūgoku Mountains. The source of the river is at an elevation of 1,004 metres (3,294 ft) in an area near Mount Mikuni and Mount Dōgo in Nichinan in southeastern Tottori Prefecture. At Kofu, the river turns north-northwest. The lower part of the Hino River flows through the Yonago Plain before finally discharging into Miho Bay at Hiezu near Yonago. Erosion over time has created the scenic Sekkakei Ravine. The Sukesawa Dam forms an artificial lake, Lake Nichinan. Approximately 60,800 people use the water provided by the Hino River.

== Tributaries ==
- Inga River (印賀川, Inga-gawa) - 25.8 kilometres (16.0 mi)
- Hosshōji River (法勝寺川, Hosshōji-gawa) - 23.5 kilometres (14.6 mi)
