= Fukuichi Site =

Yayoi period settlement trace in Yonago, Tottori, Japan

Fukuichi site
- 福市遺跡 (Japanese)
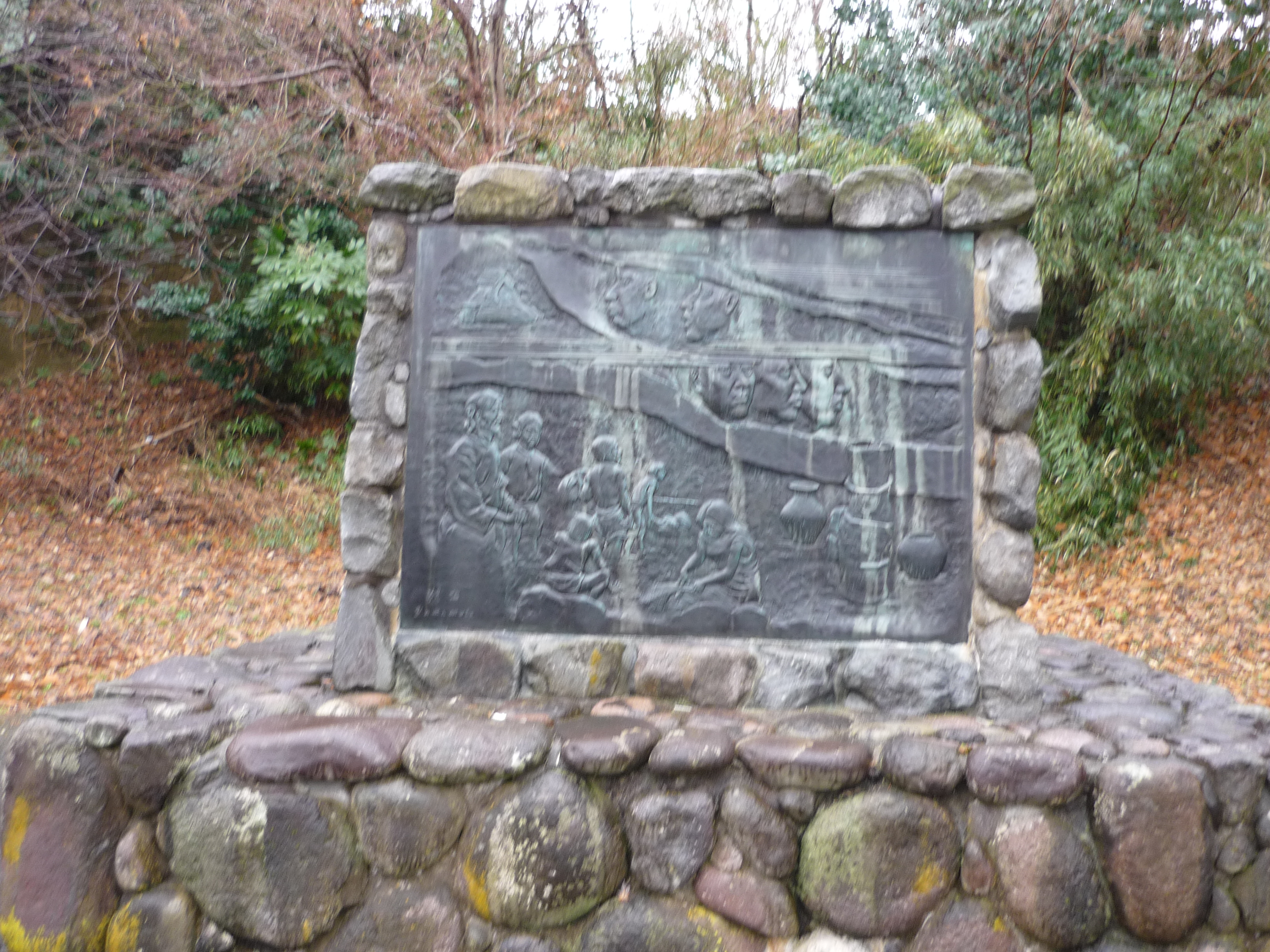
- Fukuichi site

- Fukuichi site Fukuichi Site (Japan)
- 35°24′8.9″N 133°22′5.7″E
- Type: Settlement trace
- Periods: Yayoi - Kofun period
- Location: Yonago, Tottori, Japan
- Region: San'in region

Site notes
- Public access: Yes (park and museum)
- National Historic Site of Japan

The Fukuichi Site (福市遺跡, Fukuichi iseki) is an archaeological site with the traces of a late-Yayoi period(3rd century) to mid-Kofun period (5th century) settlement located in the "Chojabaru Plateau" area of the city of Yonago, Tottori Prefecture, in the San'in region of Japan. It was designated a National Historic Site in 1970.

== Overview ==
It has been known for a long time that ancient ruins are distributed in the Fukuichi Hills (25 meters above sea level) located at the confluence of the Hino River and the Hoshoji River in the city of Yonago, but archaeological excavations only began in 1966 immediately prior to the construction of a housing complex. The site consists of the traces of a settlement which once existed from the late Yayoi period into the Asuka period and a cemetery centered on pit graves. The ruins extend about 500 meters from east-to-west and about 400 meters from north-to-south, and are divided into 7 subgroups: Yamaichiba, Goshobara, Minamigoshobara, Yotsutsukadani, Hiyakiyama, Yoshizuka, and Aokimukai. A total of 152 dwelling sites, 28 pit tombs, 6 kofun, and 14 horizontal chamber tombs have been found. Approximately 35,000 relics were excavated, including Yayoi pottery and stone tools (stone axes), magatama beads, and iron weapons. Of academic importance was evidence on how the shape of pit dwellings evolved from a circular to square layout over time. Due to a petition by local residents, on October 17, 1970, 39,414 square meters of the Yoshizuka and Hiyakeyama districts were designated as National Historic Site. After excavation, the area was backfilled for preservation and opened to the public as a park with restorations of pit dwellings. The Fukuichi Archaeological Museum (福市考古資料館) in the park exhibits excavated items.

The site is 15 minutes by car from JR West Yonago Station.

The Fukuichi Site is adjacent to the Aoki Site, also a National Historic Site.

== See also ==
- List of Historic Sites of Japan (Tottori)
