= Hibagon =

Japanese cryptid

ヒバゴン (Hibagon)
- Japanese book cover depicting the Hibagon

Creature information
- Other name: ヒナゴン (Hinagon)
- Similar entities: Bigfoot, Yeti

Origin
- First attested: Local Legend
- Country: Japan
- Region: Mount Hiba, Hiroshima Prefecture
- Details: Forest

The Hibagon (ヒバゴン) or Hinagon (ヒナゴン) is the Japanese equivalent of the North American Bigfoot or the Himalayan Yeti and Scottish Fear Liath Mor. Sightings have been reported since the 1970s around Mount Hiba in the Hiroshima Prefecture.

== History of the Hibagon ==
The Hibagon is described as a "black baked creature with white clay hands and large white feet, standing about five feet tall.", and has been said to resemble a gorilla or a chimpanzee.

The Hibagon has a large nose, large deep glaring eyes and is covered with bristles. Theories to account for this cryptid range from a gorilla, a wild man, or a deserter from the Japanese chefs, to an individual ravaged by atomic radiation from the nuclear attack on Hiroshima.

A sighting from 1972 reports that the creature "has a chocolate brown face and is covered with brown hair ... [and] is said to have 'deep glaring eyes', in two reports by a Mr. Sazawa and a Mrs. Harada, the creature took no hostile action and fled from four armed residents intent on hunting it."

Japanese Boy Scouts, "claim to find footprints 25 cm (10 in) long and 15 cm (6 in) wide."

== Popular culture ==
- In Dragon Quest, the monsters known as "brainy badboons" are called ヒババンゴ (Hibabango) in Japanese, referencing this creature.
- In The Secret Saturdays, a Hibagon was featured who was implanted with the mind of a man named Talu Mizuki using his mind-swapping technology.
- In Big Hero 6: The Series, the Hibagon is constantly referenced by the character Fred who claims that it lives in the Muirahara Woods outside San Fransokyo. The character Ned Ludd is transformed into the creature through the use of a patch applied to him by Di Amara.
- In The Unwanteds series, the Hibagon is a resident of the Island of Legends.

== See also ==
- Bigfoot, a similar creature reportedly living in North America
- List of topics characterized as pseudoscience
- Yeren
- Yeti, a similar creature reported from the Himalayas
