= Nichinan, Tottori =

Nichinan 日南町
- Town
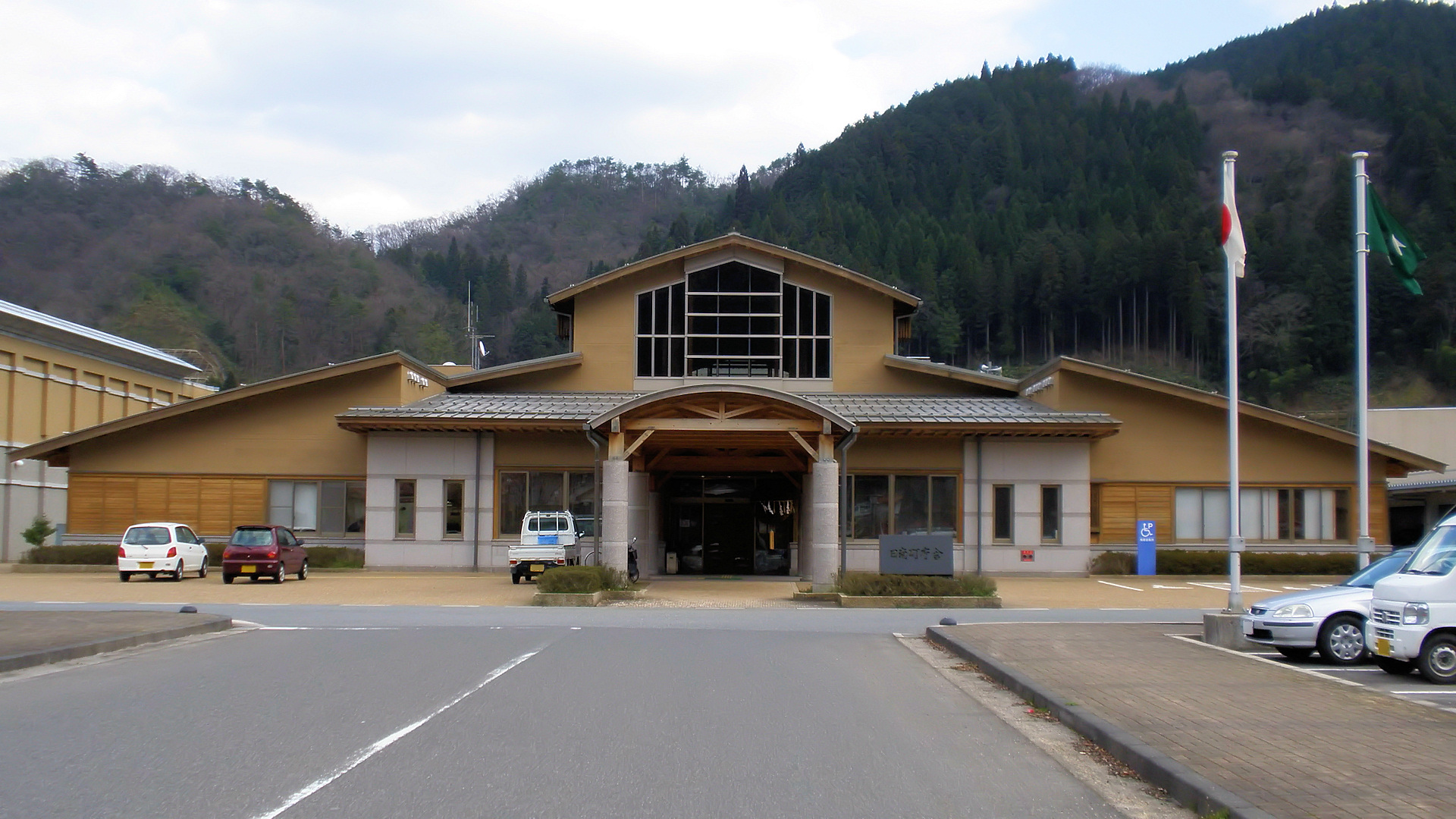
- Nichinan town hall

- Flag Emblem
- Location of Nichinan in Tottori Prefecture

- Coordinates: 35°10′N 133°18′E
- Country: Japan
- Region: Chūgoku; San'in
- Prefecture: Tottori
- District: Hino

Area
  - Total: 340.96 km^{2} (131.65 sq mi)

Population (December 31, 2022)
  - Total: 4,144
  - Density: 12.15/km^{2} (31.48/sq mi)
- Time zone: UTC+9 (Japan Standard Time)
- Phone number: 0859-82-1111
- Address: 800 Kasumi, Nichinan, Hino-gun, Tottori-ken 689-5292
- Climate: Cfa
- Website: Official website

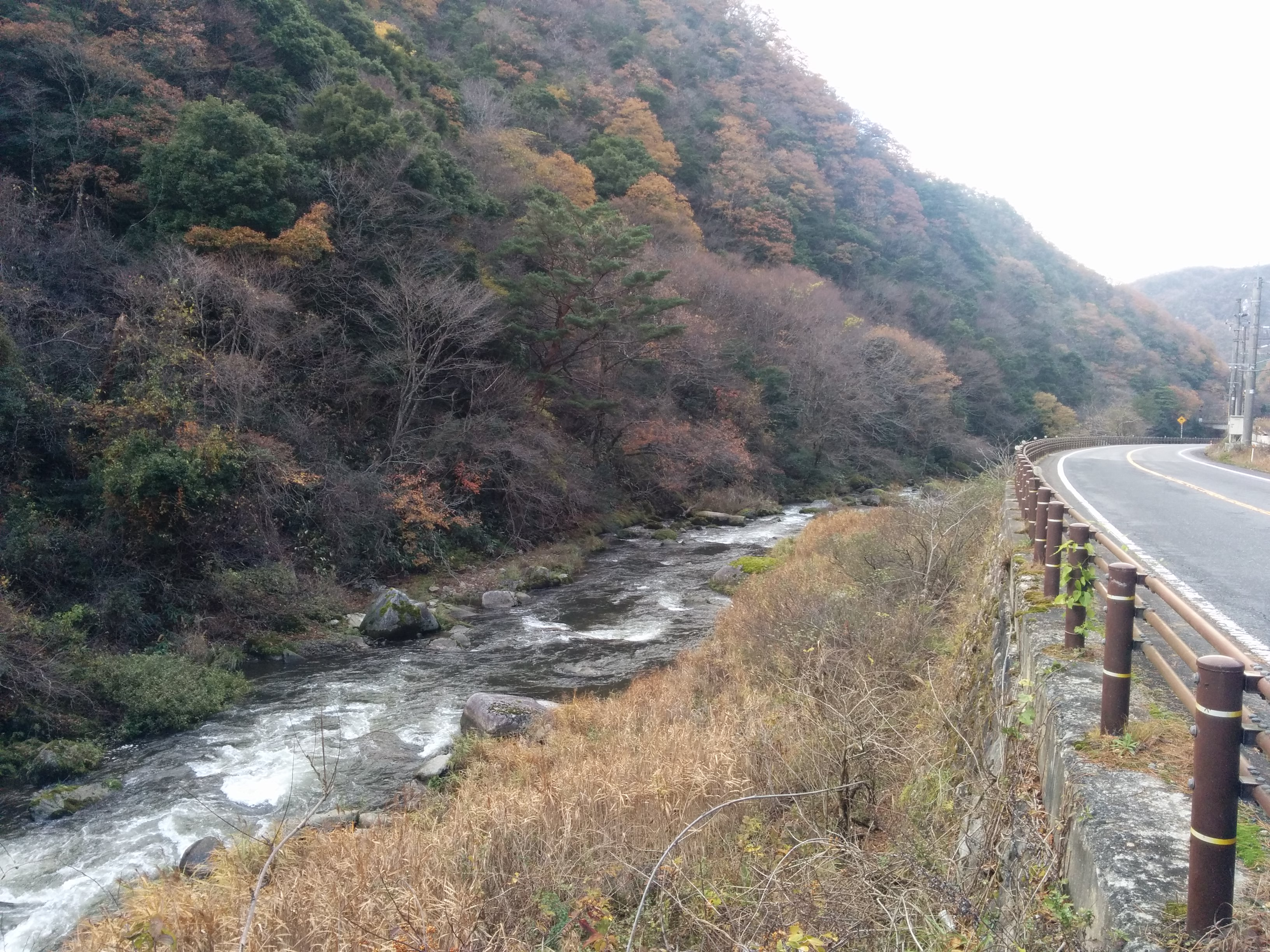
Sekkakei Gorge

Nichinan (日南町, Nichinan-chō) is a town located in Hino District, Tottori Prefecture, Japan. As of 31 December 2021, the town had an estimated population of 4,144 in 1903 households and a population density of 12 persons per km^{2}. The total area of the town is 340.962 square kilometres (131.646 sq mi), representing 10% of the total area of Tottori Prefecture.Over 90% of the town is covered by mountains and forest, and 5% of the land is arable. Areas of Nichinan are part of Hiba-Dogo-Taishaku Quasi-National Park.

== Geography ==
Nichinan is a landlocked town located at the south-western tip of Hino District in the southwestern corner of Tottori Prefecture. The town is mountainous and located on the backbone of the Chūgoku Mountains.

=== Neighboring municipalities ===
Hiroshima Prefecture

- Shōbara

Tottori Prefecture

- Hino
- Nanbu

Okayama Prefecture

- Niimi

Shimane Prefecture

- Okuizumo
- Yasugi

=== Mountains ===
- Mount Dōgo (道後山, Dōgōyama)–1,271 m (4,170 ft)
- Mount Hanami (花見山, Hanamiyama)–1,188 m (3,898 ft)
- Mount Inazumi (稲積山, Inazumiyama)–1,143.3 m (3,751 ft)
- Mount Sentsū (船通山, Sentsūzan)–1,142 m (3,747 ft)
- Mount Ōkura (大倉山, Ōkurasan)–1,112 m (3,648 ft)
- Mount Kirin (鬼林山, Kirinzan)–1,031 m (3,383 ft)
- Mount Mikuni (三国山, Mikunisan)–1,004.1 m (3,294 ft)
- Mount Ohaka (御墓山, Ohakayama)–758 m (2,487 ft)

=== Lakes ===
- Lake Nichinan (日南湖, Nichinanko)

=== Dams ===
- Sugesawa Dam (菅沢ダム, Sugesawa Damu)

=== Rivers ===
The Hino River originates in Nichinan. Four of its major tributaries in Nichinan include:

- Inga River (印賀川, Inga-gawa)
- Iwami River (石見川, Iwami-gawa)
- Kobara River (小原川, Kobara-gawa)
- Kutsuka River (九塚川, Kutsuka-gawa)

== Climate ==
Nichinan has a humid subtropical climate (Köppen Cfa) characterized by warm, wet summers and cold winters with heavy snowfall. The average annual temperature in Nichinan is 11.3 °C (52.3 °F). The average annual rainfall is 1,894.1 mm (74.57 in) with July as the wettest month. The temperatures are highest on average in August, at around 23.4 °C (74.1 °F), and lowest in January, at around −0.2 °C (31.6 °F). Its record high is 34.9 °C (94.8 °F), reached on 19 August 2020, and its record low is −17.7 °C (0.1 °F), reached on 16 February 2011.

Climate data for Chaya, Nichinan (elevation 490 m, 1991–2020 normals, extremes 1978–present)
Month	Jan	Feb	Mar	Apr	May	Jun	Jul	Aug	Sep	Oct	Nov	Dec	Year
Record high °C (°F)	15.3 (59.5)	19.1 (66.4)	23.2 (73.8)	29.7 (85.5)	31.7 (89.1)	33.0 (91.4)	34.6 (94.3)	35.0 (95.0)	32.9 (91.2)	28.9 (84.0)	24.8 (76.6)	18.2 (64.8)	35.0 (95.0)
Mean daily maximum °C (°F)	3.9 (39.0)	5.1 (41.2)	9.7 (49.5)	16.4 (61.5)	21.4 (70.5)	24.3 (75.7)	27.8 (82.0)	28.8 (83.8)	24.3 (75.7)	18.9 (66.0)	13.2 (55.8)	6.9 (44.4)	16.7 (62.1)
Daily mean °C (°F)	−0.2 (31.6)	0.3 (32.5)	3.9 (39.0)	9.6 (49.3)	15.0 (59.0)	18.9 (66.0)	22.9 (73.2)	23.4 (74.1)	19.0 (66.2)	12.9 (55.2)	7.3 (45.1)	2.2 (36.0)	11.3 (52.3)
Mean daily minimum °C (°F)	−4.5 (23.9)	−4.7 (23.5)	−1.8 (28.8)	2.7 (36.9)	8.6 (47.5)	14.0 (57.2)	18.8 (65.8)	19.1 (66.4)	14.6 (58.3)	7.3 (45.1)	1.9 (35.4)	−2.1 (28.2)	6.2 (43.2)
Record low °C (°F)	−17.4 (0.7)	−17.7 (0.1)	−14.0 (6.8)	−6.9 (19.6)	−2.5 (27.5)	3.2 (37.8)	6.3 (43.3)	10.3 (50.5)	1.0 (33.8)	−3.2 (26.2)	−9.2 (15.4)	−14.5 (5.9)	−17.7 (0.1)
Average precipitation mm (inches)	137.1 (5.40)	114.2 (4.50)	138.2 (5.44)	121.4 (4.78)	131.9 (5.19)	194.1 (7.64)	253.9 (10.00)	162.7 (6.41)	234.4 (9.23)	147.2 (5.80)	110.8 (4.36)	150.7 (5.93)	1,894.1 (74.57)
Average precipitation days (≥ 1.0 mm)	19.2	15.6	15.4	11.6	11.0	12.5	14.1	12.0	12.5	10.8	13.3	18.6	166.5
Mean monthly sunshine hours	57.7	72.2	129.8	178.0	195.1	139.4	139.4	172.1	120.0	133.0	104.0	67.3	1,508.5
Source: Japan Meteorological Agency (1991–2020 normals, extremes 1978–present)

== Demography ==
Per Japanese census data, the population of Nichinan has been as follows. The town has been suffering from rural depopulation, and the population has been rapidly decreasing since the 1960s.

Historical population
Year	Pop.	±%
1920	13,080	—
1930	13,779	+5.3%
1940	13,829	+0.4%
1950	16,045	+16.0%
1960	15,286	−4.7%
1970	11,051	−27.7%
1980	8,889	−19.6%
1990	7,974	−10.3%
2000	6,696	−16.0%
2010	5,458	−18.5%

== History ==
The area of Nichinan was part of ancient Hōki Province. During the Edo Period, it was part of the holdings of the Ikeda clan of Tottori Domain. Following the Meiji restoration. the area was divided into villages within Hino District, Tottori on October 1, 1889, with the establishment of the modern municipalities system. The town of Hokunan (伯南町) was created by the merger of the villages of Hinoue and Yamagami on May 2, 1955. It merged with the villages of Takamiya, Tari, Iwami and Fukue to form the town of Nichinan on April 1, 1959.

== Government ==
Nichinan has a mayor-council form of government with a directly elected mayor and a unicameral town council of ten members. Nichinan, collectively with the other municipalities of Hino District, contributes one member to the Tottori Prefectural Assembly. In terms of national politics, the town is part of Tottori 2nd district of the lower house of the Diet of Japan.

== Economy ==
The economy of Nichinan is based agriculture, forestry, and seasonal tourism to its ski resorts.

== Education ==
Nichinan has one public elementary school and one public junior high school operated by the town government. The town does not have a high school.

== Transportation ==
=== Railway ===
JR West - Hakubi Line

- Kami-Iwami - Shōyama

=== Highways ===
- National Route 180
- National Route 183

== Sister cities ==
- Portsmouth, New Hampshire, United States
- Scotts Valley, California, United States

== Local attractions ==
- Sekka Gorge
- Nichinan Historic Village
- Nichinan Apple Village
- Hanamiyama Ski Resort
- Sasaraku-jinja
- Gedatsu-ji

== Cultural institutions ==
The Nichinan Cultural Center (785 Kasumi, Nichinan, Tottori), located next to the Nichinan Town Hall, houses the town's three main cultural facilities in one building. The Cultural Center is accessible by bus, or a 30-minute walk, from the JR West Hakubi Line Shōyama Station.

- Satsuki Hall—a 502-seat performance hall
- Nichinan Library
- Nichinan Art Museum
