= Kumiko Okae =

Japanese actress (1956–2020)

- 岡江久美子
- Born: Kumiko Okae; 23 August 1956
- Died: 23 April 2020 (aged 63); Tokyo, Japan
- Occupations: Actress, voice actress, television presenter
- Years active: 1975–2020
- Spouse: Baku Owada (m. 1983)
- Children: Miho Ohwada

Kumiko Owada (大和田 久美子, Ōwada Kumiko; 23 August 1956 – 23 April 2020), née Okae (岡江), was a Japanese actress, voice actress, and television presenter. She was known for her work on television dramas, as well as hosting entertainment and variety shows, such as Renso Game on NHK. Okae also hosted the morning show Hanamaru Market on Tokyo Broadcasting System Television from 1996 to 2014.

== Career ==
Okae began her professional acting career in 1975. She appeared in numerous television roles and variety shows from the 1970s to the 2010s. In 1982, she released the album Yes, I Feel on the Casablanca label. She acted in television dramas, and hosted entertainment and variety shows, such as Rensō Game on NHK. Okae hosted the morning show, Hanamaru Market, on Tokyo Broadcasting System Television from 1996 until 2014.

== Personal life ==
Okae married actor Baku Ohwada in 1983, who she had met while they were both regular panelists on Rensō Game. They had a daughter, actress Miho Ohwada.

== Death ==
Okae underwent surgery for early stage breast cancer in late 2019. She was then treated with Radiation therapy from January to mid-February 2020, which further weakened her immune system. On 3 April 2020, Okae developed a fever and her health began to deteriorate. She was admitted to a Tokyo hospital on 6 April, placed on a ventilator and later diagnosed with COVID-19 during the COVID-19 pandemic in Japan. Okae died from pneumonia in the Tokyo hospital on April 23, 2020, at the age of 63. Okae's death, along with the death of comedian Ken Shimura less than a month prior, were amongst the first prolific celebrity deaths related to COVID-19 in Japan.
