= Hiezu, Tottori =

Hiezu 日吉津村
- Village
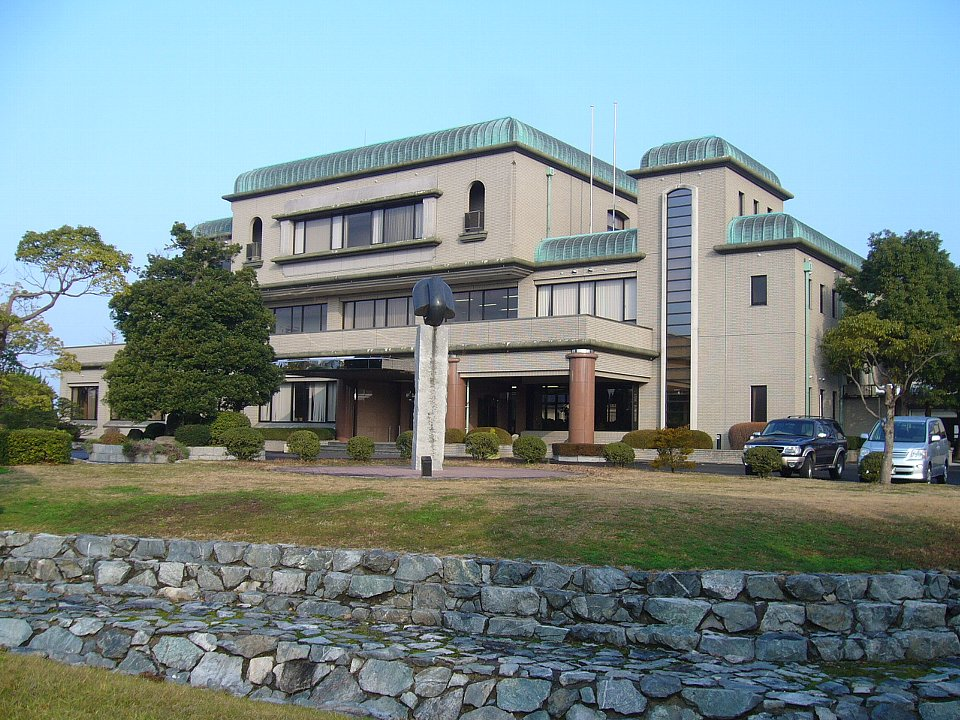
- Hiezu Village Hall, Hiezu, Tottori Prefecture

- Flag Seal
- Interactive map of Hiezu
- Coordinates: 35°26′35″N 133°22′51″E
- Country: Japan
- Region: Chūgoku
- Prefecture: Tottori
- District: Saihaku

Area
  - Total: 4.20 km^{2} (1.62 sq mi)

Population (January 1, 2023)
  - Total: 3,599
  - Density: 857/km^{2} (2,220/sq mi)
- Time zone: UTC+9 (Japan Standard Time)
- Symbols
  - Tree: Black pine
  - Flower: Tulip
- Phone number: 0859-27-0211
- Address: 872-15 Hiezu, Hiezu-son, Saihaku-gun, Tottori-ken 689-3553
- Website: Official website

Hiezu (日吉津村, Hiezu-son) is a village in Saihaku District, Tottori Prefecture, Japan. As of 31 December 2022, it had an estimated population of 3,955 in 1277 households and a population density of 860 persons per km^{2}. Its total area is 4.2 square kilometres (1.6 sq mi).

== Geography ==
Hiezu faces the Miho Bay on the Sea of Japan and is surrounded on three sides by the city of Yonago. The town has three districts: Hiezu, Tomiyoshi, and Imayoshi. Hiezu sits at east the mouth of the Hino River (77 kilometres (48 mi)), which crosses much of western Tottori Prefecture before emptying into the Sea of Japan. The village sits on low, damp, sandy land. 57% of the area of Hiezu is arable.

=== Neighbouring municipalities ===
Tottori Prefecture

- Yonago

== Demography ==
As per Japanese census data, this is the population of Hiezu in recent years.

Historical population
Year	Pop.	±%
1920	1,829	—
1930	1,993	+9.0%
1940	1,833	−8.0%
1950	2,215	+20.8%
1960	2,266	+2.3%
1970	2,259	−0.3%
1980	2,552	+13.0%
1990	2,830	+10.9%
2000	2,971	+5.0%
2010	3,336	+12.3%

== History ==
Hiezu, unlike other areas of Tottori Prefecture, has no evidence of ancient settlements. The area was inhospitable to early settlement due to coastal flooding and its sandy soil. The area of present-day Hiezu appears in a Heian-period dictionary compiled in 934, the Wamyō Ruijushō, as part of the village of Mino in Aimi District. Hiezu became part of the Kayashima shōen estate after this period, but all three areas of the village were destroyed by fire in 1571 in a regional conflict during the Sengoku period (1467 – 1573). By 1617 the village came under the control of the Ikeda clan, which controlled Hiezu as part of the Tottori Domain through the Edo period (1603 – 1868). The present-day village of Hiezu was formed by the merger of the villages on Hiezu, Tomiyoshi, and Imayoshi in 1889. The residents of Hiezu rejected a referendum on a merger with the city of Yonago in 2006. Hiezu, despite its small size, is the only village in Tottori Prefecture and remains an autonomous municipality.

== Government ==
Heizu has a mayor-council form of government with a directly elected mayor and a unicameral village council of 10 members. Heizu, collectively with the other municipalities of Saihaku District, contributes three members to the Tottori Prefectural Assembly. In terms of national politics, the village is part of Tottori 2nd district of the lower house of the Diet of Japan.

== Economy ==
The economy of Heizu is based commerce. The raising of tulips is a local speciality

== Education ==
Heizu has one public elementary schools and one public junior high schools operated by the town government, although the junior high school is actually located within the borders of neighboring Yonago. The village does not have a high school.

== Transportation ==
=== Railway ===
The village does not have any passenger railway service. The nearest train station is Hōki-Daisen Station which is served by both the San'in Line and Hakubi Lines of JR West.

=== Highways ===
- National Route 9
- National Route 431
