= Taishaku Valley =

Ravine in Japan

Coordinates: 34°50′46″N 133°13′34″E

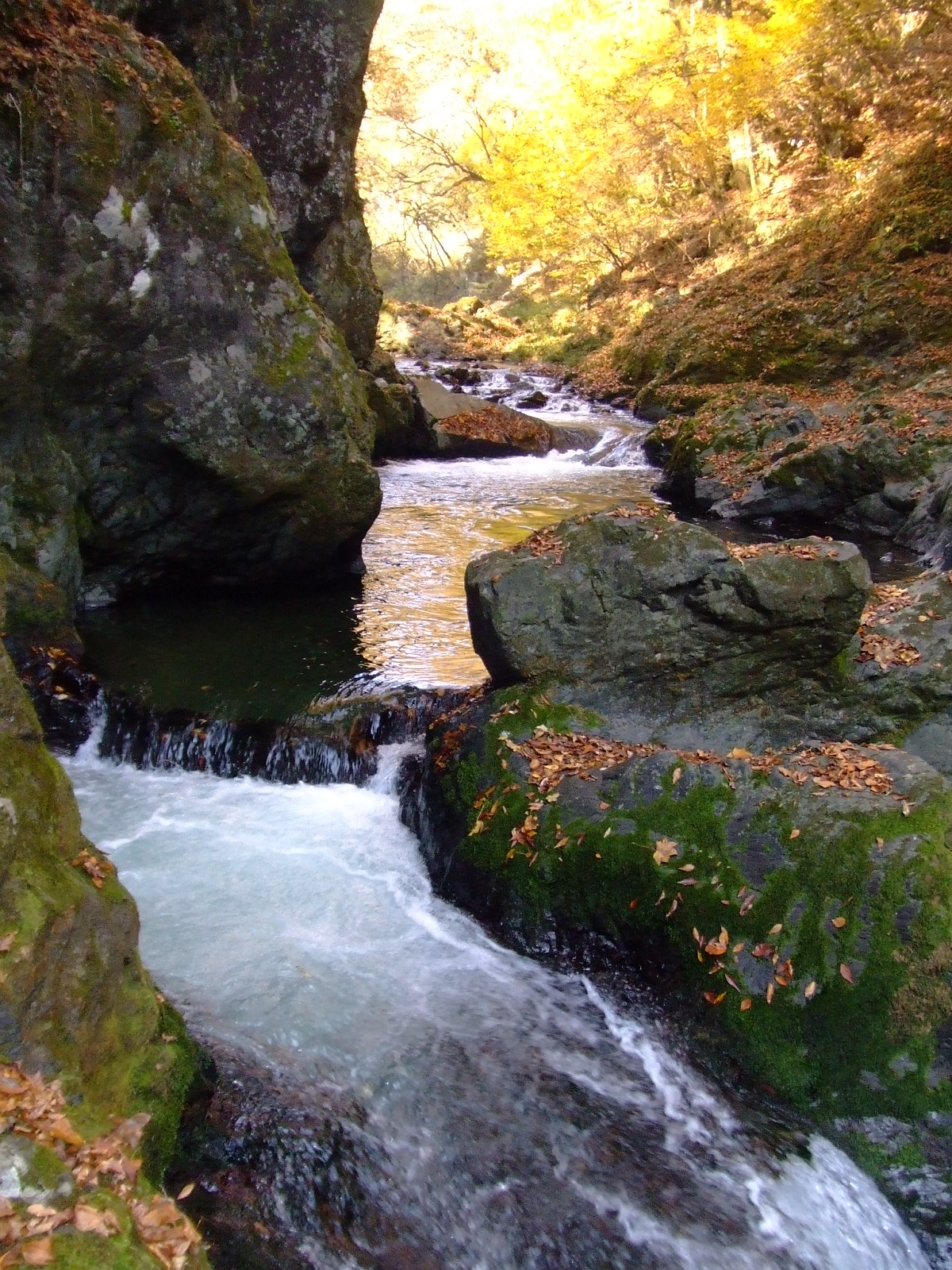
Taishaku river

Summer in Taishaku Valley

Taishaku Valley (帝釈峡, Taishaku-kyō) is a ravine in Japan noted for its beauty.

== Overview ==
Taishaku Valley is a ravine that is 18 kilometres (11 mi) in length along the Taishaku River, one of the tributaries of the Takahashi River in Shōbara and Jinsekikōgen, Hiroshima, Japan.

The valley is part of the Hiba-Dogo-Taishaku Quasi-National Park. It is known for autumn leaves and maples.

== See also ==
- Hiba-Dogo-Taishaku Quasi-National Park
- List of national parks of Japan
