= Miho Ohwada =

Japanese actress (born 1983)

- 大和田 美帆
- Born: August 22, 1983 (age 43); Tokyo, Japan
- Occupation: Actress
- Years active: 2003–present
- Height: 1.57 m (5 ft 2 in)
- Children: 1
- Parent(s): Baku Owada; Kumiko Okae
- Website: Official website

Miho Ohwada (大和田 美帆, Ōwada Miho; born August 22, 1983) is a Japanese actress. She previously represented by the talent agency Staff-plus.

== Biography ==
Miho Owada is the daughter of Kumiko Okae (1956–2020), an actress and television presenter, and Baku Owada, an actor. She graduated from the Toyo Eiwa Junior High and Senior High Part in Nihon University's Gei-jutsu Graduate Film School.

She performed in a high school musical, and in 2003 her acting debut was in the stage play Pure Love. In 2006, Ohwada served as an image model for the sports club Jexer.

On June 6, 2014, she married a friend from her high school.

On April 23, 2015, Ohwada announced in her blog that she was five months pregnant, after having a miscarriage two years earlier due to polyendocrine metabolic ovarian syndrome. On September 13, she gave birth to a baby girl.

On December 31, 2018, she announced her divorce.

On March 31, 2021, she left Staff-plus and became freelance.

== Filmography ==
=== TV series ===
Year	Title	Role	Network	Notes
2005	Muta Keiji-kan Jiken File	Sachiko Kitagawa	TV Asahi	
2005	Shiawaseninaritai!	Kaoru	TBS	
2005	Oniyome Nikki		Fuji TV	Episode 9
2006	Cinderella ni Naritai!	Saki Warifuji	TBS	
2007	Sakura-sho no Onna-tachi	Sae Tashiro	TV Asahi	Episode 6
2007	Shin Keishichō Josei Sōsahan	Momo Matsumoto	TV Asahi	
2007	Kishō Yohō-shi Fujiko Osawa no Jiken File	Mariko	Fuji TV	
2007	Chō Kōsō Hotel Woman vs. Onna Gurad Man	Kaoru Shinomiya	TV Asahi	
2008	Kariya Keibu Series	Kanako Asami	TBS	
2009	Keishichō Mitsuboshi Keiji Jotaro Sasaki	Izumi Sawamoto	Fuji TV	
2010	Flunk Punk Rumble	Kairi Shinagawa	TBS	
2010	Setsuen	Natsumi Sawai	TV Tokyo	
2011	Mito Kōmon Dai 43-bu	Natsu, Konatsu	TBS	Double role
2012	Misuzu Kaneko Monogatari: Minna Chigatte Minna Ī	Yutaka Tanabe's substitute	TBS	
2013	Machigawa re Chatta Otoko		Fuji TV	Narration
2013	Fumito Hiwa Historia	Maeda Matsu	NHK	Documentary
2013	Kuroi Jū-ri no Hitomi Kuroki III		NHK BS Premium	
2013	Keishichō Sōsaikka 9 Kakari	Chika Kosugi	TV Asahi	Season 8, Episode 4
2013	Kyoto Chiken no Onna Dai	Yukari Imanishi	TV Asahi	Season 9, Episode 3
2013	Izakaya Moheji 2: Anata to Watashi	Akari Kishida	TBS	
2013	Jikken Keiji Totori 2	Yuka	NHK	Episode 1
2014	Matsumoto Seichō Kuroi Fukuin: Kokusaisen Stewardess Satsujin Jiken		TV Asahi	
2015	Watashitachi ga Propose sa Renai no ni wa, 101 no Riyū ga Atteda na	Mie / Marika / Kanako	LaLa TV	Episode 10
2015	Depart Shikake Hito! Tamami Tennōji no Satsujin Suiri	Chinatsu Shono	ABC	
2016	Yamehan Shindō Kensuke Koroshi no Jikenbo	Ayako Shinoda	TBS	
2019	Aibou	Ayako Nakano	TV Asahi	Season 17, Episode 13

=== Films ===
Year	Title	Role	Notes
2009	Kondo no Nichiyōbini	Minako Isaka	
2009	Tenshi no Koi	Nurse	
2014	Lupin III	Miss V (voice)	
