= Miho Bay =

Bay in Tottori Prefecture, Japan

Miho Bay 美保湾
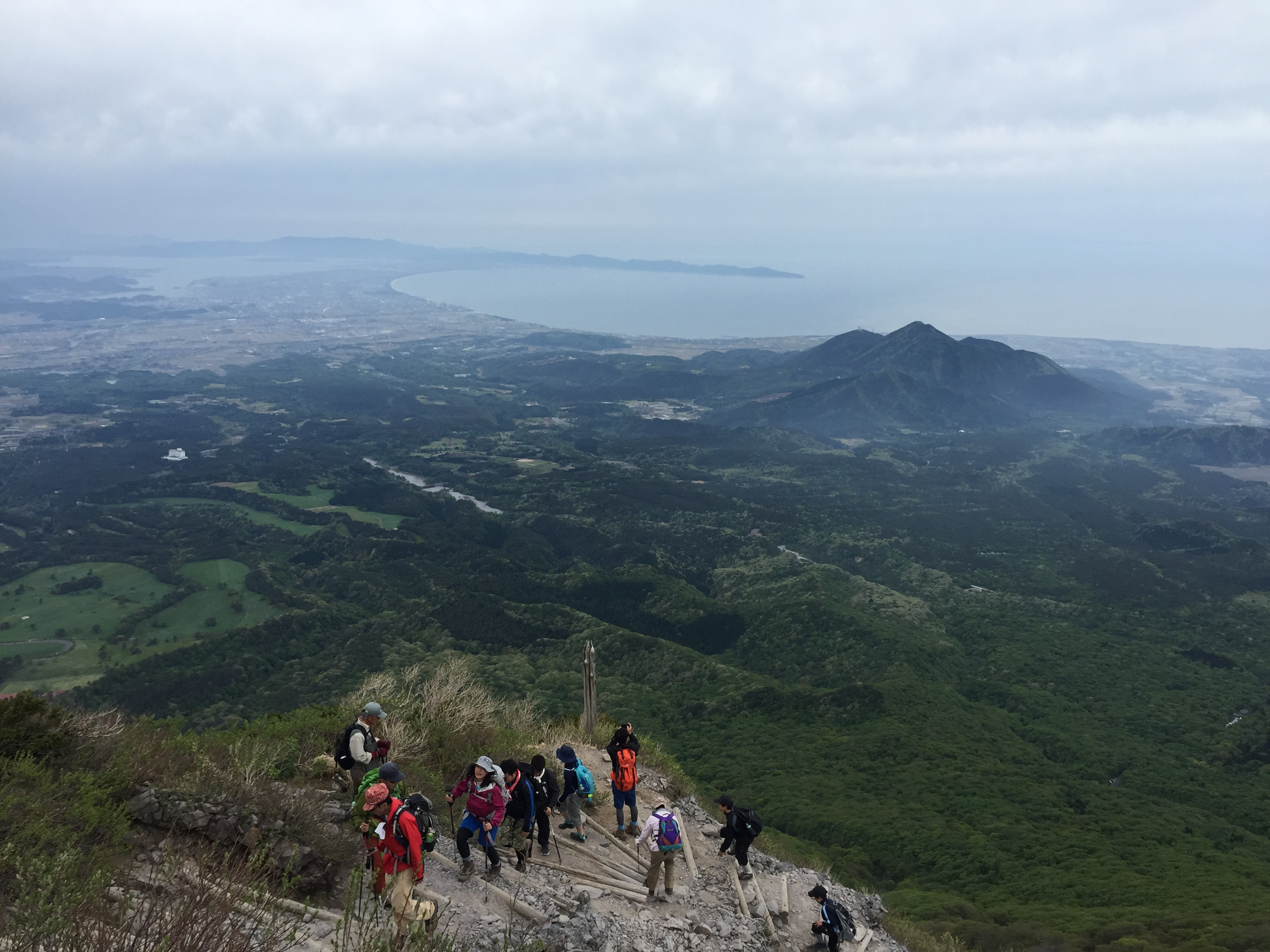
- Miho Bay seen from Mount Daisen

- Location within Tottori Prefecture
- Coordinates: 35°31′0″N 133°20′50″E
- River sources: Sakai Channel; Miho River; Hino River; Amida River
- Ocean/sea sources: Sea of Japan
- Basin countries: Japan
- Max. length: 14 kilometres (8.7 mi)
- Max. width: 9.4 kilometres (5.8 mi)
- Settlements: Matsue; Sakaiminato; Yonago; Hiezu; Daisen

Miho Bay (美保湾, Miho-wan) is a bay on the north coast of western Honshu, the largest island of Japan. The bay faces the Sea of Japan and within the borders of Tottori Prefecture. Miho bay is bounded to the west by Yumigahama Peninsula, which forms the western border with Shimane Prefecture.

== Geography ==
Miho Bay is approximately 14 kilometres (8.7 mi) in length, extends 9.4 kilometres (5.8 mi) from the coast, and has a depth of 30 metres (98 ft). The bay has an average temperature of between 20 and 22 °C.

Miho Bay is generally defined as extending from the mouth of the Amida River in Daisen to the east and Cape Jizō at the tip of the Shimane Peninsula to the west. Miho Bay is naturally protected by numerous reefs and the quicksand of the Hino River, but as these natural areas of protection have decreased, coastal erosion has become a problem along the bay.

Miho Bay was known historically as a safe harbor.

== Coastal cities and towns ==
Miho Bay is faced by the coastal cities and towns of and Matsue, Shimane Prefecture, Sakaiminato and Yonago make up the Yumigahama Peninsula coastal area of Miho Bay, and the coast continues east to Hiezu and Daisen at the west of Tottori Prefecture.

== Rivers ==
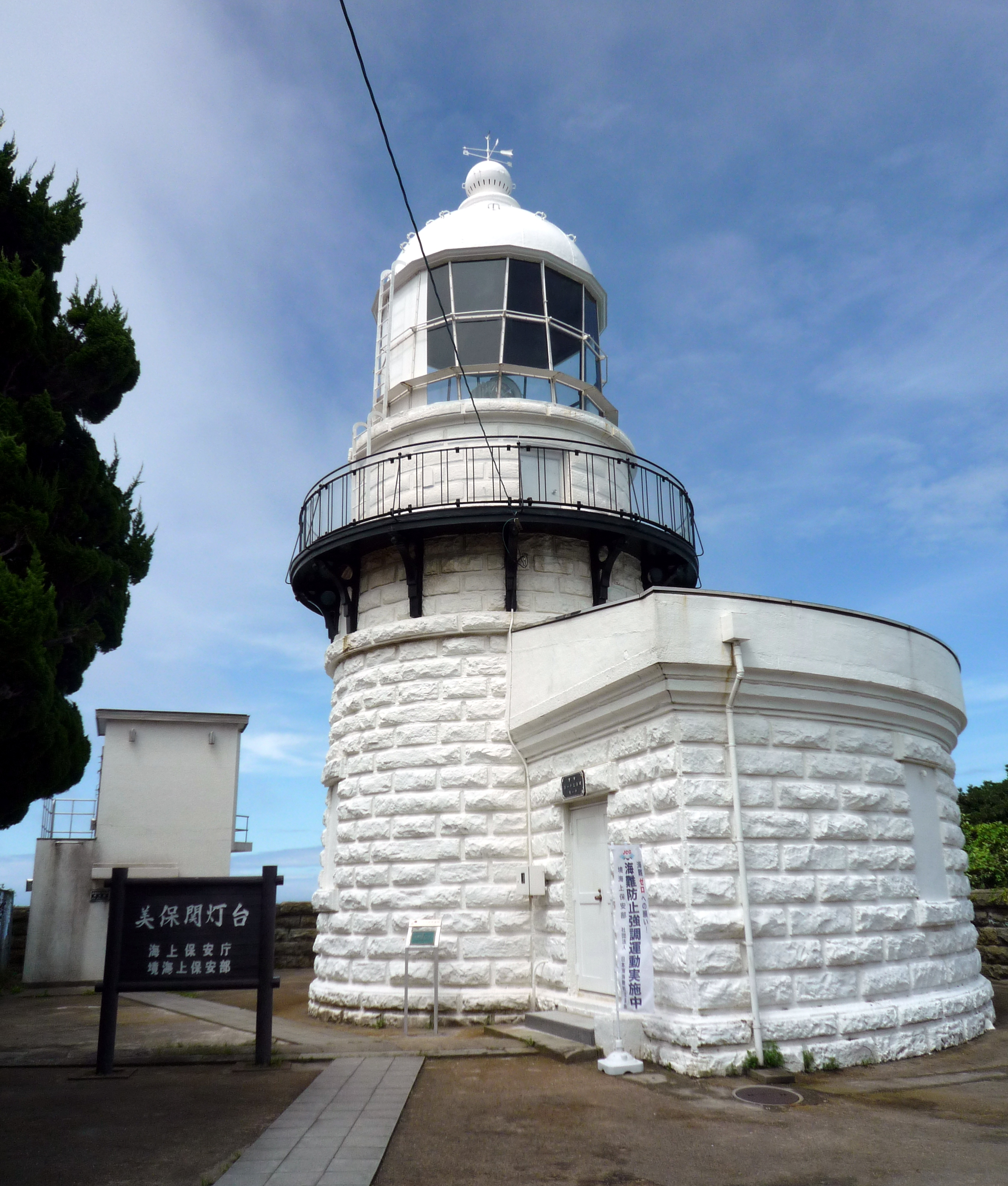
Mihonoseki Lighthouse at the tip of Cape Jizō

The Hino River, the Miho River, and the Amida River all empty into Miho Bay. The short, shallow Sakai Channel connects Nakaumi and Lake Jinji to Miho Bay.

== Tourism and recreation ==
A large onsen in Yonago, the Keike Onsen, faces Miho Bay. There are also yachting and fishing facilities, as well as numerous white sandy beaches.

== Transportation ==
Yonago Airport prominently occupies the middle of the Yumigahama Peninsula, and the runway of the airport is less than 1 km from Miho Bay.

Two train lines run along the distance of the bay. The JR West Sanin Main Line runs near the eastern coast of the bay to Yonago Station, and the JR West Sakai Line runs along the western coast of the bay to Sakaiminato Station.

Miho Bay has traditionally been one point of connection to the Oki Islands. One ferry to the Oki Islands, name, has a terminus on Nakaumi in Sakaiminato, travels through the Sakai Channel, crosses Miho Bay, and the connects to the Oki Islands across the Sea of Japan.

== Mihonoseki Incident ==
In 1927, 4 nautical miles from Cape Jizō, the light cruiser Jintsuu and the Momi-class destroyer Warabi, both ships of the Imperial Japanese Navy, collided at the mouth of Miho Bay. There were 92 naval personnel who were killed when the Warabi sunk, and 28 were killed aboard the Jintsuu. The event became known as the Mihonoseki Incident (美保関事件, Mihonoseki no Jiken). Captain Keiji Mizushiro (1883–1927) was questioned, but committed suicide before the beginning of the trial. The Jintsuu was recommissioned during World War II and was sunk by US Navy cruisers during the Battle of Kolombangara on July 13th, 1943.
