= Mount Hiba (Hiroshima) =

Mountain in the country of Japan

- Location within Japan

Highest point
- Elevation: 1,299 m (4,262 ft)
- Coordinates: 35°3′40.4″N 133°3′34.4″E

Geography
- Location: Hiba-Dogo-Taishaku Quasi-National Park

Mount Hiba (比婆山, Hiba-yama) is a mountain in Shōbara, Hiroshima Prefecture, Japan, with a height of 1,299 metres. It is within Hiba-Dogo-Taishaku Quasi-National Park.

== See also ==
- Hibagon
- Mount Hiba (Shimane)
