= Mio (surname) =

Mio or Mío is a surname. Notable people with the surname include:

- Atsushi Mio (born 1983), Japanese former footballer
- Chiara Mio (born 1964), Italian business executive and professor
- Daniel Mio (1941–2021), French politician and teacher
- Eddie Mio (born 1954), Canadian former National Hockey League goaltender
- Eriberto Arroyo Mío (1943–1989), Peruvian politician
- Giovanni de Mio (after 1510–c. 1570), Italian painter and mosaicist
- Vangjush Mio (1891–1957), Albanian painter
- Washington Mio, 20th-21st century mathematician
