= Mio =

Mio or MIO may refer to:

== Arts and entertainment ==
- MIO, a former stage name of a Japanese pop singer now known as MIQ (vocalist)
- Mío, a 2011 album by David Bustamante
- "Mío", a 1992 song by Paulina Rubio
- Mio: Memories in Orbit, a video game

== Brands, companies, and organisations ==
- Marine Industries Organization, the major producer of naval equipment for the Iranian Navies
- Masivo Integrado de Occidente, a bus transit system serving Cali, Colombia
- MiO, a Kraft foods flavor product, marketed as a "liquid water enhancer"
- MIO, the Greenlandic National Advocacy for Children's Rights Center, led by Aviâja Egede Lynge
- Mio, a line of flutes manufactured by Cannonball Musical Instruments
- Mio Technology, a Taiwanese mobile electronics manufacturer
- mio TV, a pay-TV service by SingTel
- Yamaha Mio, a motorcycle

== People and fictional characters ==
- Mio (given name), a feminine Japanese given name, including a list of people and fictional characters
- Mio (surname), a list of people
- Michael Mio Nielsen (born 1965), Danish footballer nicknamed Mio

== Places ==
- Mio, Michigan, United States, an unincorporated community and census-designated place
- Mio Dam, Michigan, a hydroelectric dam
- Smith Estate (Los Angeles), also known as "El Mio", a house on the National Register of Historic Places

== Other uses ==
- Maritime interdiction operation, a naval warfare tactic
- Mio, the Japanese Mercury orbiter flown with the BepiColombo spacecraft
- MIO Biwako Kusatsu, former name of a Japanese football club in Shiga
- MIO, IATA code and FAA LID of Miami Municipal Airport, Oklahoma, United States
- mio, an ISO 630-3 code for the Pinotepa Mixtec language of Mexico
- Abbreviation for mebioctet, a unit of information
