= Mijo Miletic =

Bosnian-Herzegovinian footballer

Personal information
- Full name: Mijo Miletic
- Date of birth: 2 June 1998 (age 28)
- Place of birth: Kiseljak, Bosnia and Herzegovina
- Height: 1.86 m (6 ft 1 in)
- Position: Centre back

Team information
- Current team: Union Gurten
- Number: 22

Youth career
- 2009–2011: Betaclub Sarajevo
- 2011–2014: FK Željezničar Sarajevo
- 2015–2017: FK Sarajevo

Senior career*
Years	Team	Apps	(Gls)
2017–2019	SV Ried	1	(0)
2017–2018	SV Ried II	23	(0)
2018–2019	→ Union Gurten (loan)	14	(0)
2019–	Union Gurten	28	(0)
- * Club domestic league appearances and goals as of 9 April 2021

Mijo Miletic (born 2 June 1998) is a Bosnian-Herzegovinian footballer who plays for Union Gurten in the Austrian third tier Regionalliga Mitte.
