= Miho (Croatian name) =

- Pronunciation: Croatian pronunciation: [mixo]
- Gender: Masculine

Origin
- Word/name: Croatian

Miho is a masculine Croatian given name meaning "Mike".

== People with the name ==
- Miho Bošković (born 1983), Croatian water polo player
- Miho Dukov (Михо Дуков, born 1955), former Bulgarian wrestler
- Miho Klaić (1829–1896), Croatian politician and a leader of the Croatian revival in Dalmatia
- Miho Mosulishvili (მიხო მოსულიშვილი, born 1962), Georgian writer and playwright
