= Miho Imada =

Japanese sake brewer

Miho Imada (Japanese: 今田 美穂; born 1962) is a sake brewmaster at Imada Shuzō in Akitsu, Hiroshima. Imada has a reputation for making some of the finest sake in the world.

== Brewery ==
Imada Shuzō is a small brewery in rural Hiroshima and produces internationally acclaimed ginjo-style sakes. It is also one of the only sake breweries owned and led by a female sake tōji (brewmaster).

Imada grew up in Akitsu, Hiroshima, famous as the birthplace of ginjo-style sake and known for its soft water. Imada Shuzō has been a family-run brewery since 1868 and Imada grew up at the brewery. She learned the art of sake from her father and grandfather, but also enrolled in the National Research Institute of Brewing to learn about sake production in 1993. In 1994, she returned to Imada Shuzō and studied under the tōji for eight years before becoming the head sake master when he retired in 2000. Her father, Yukinao Imada, was growing older, and her brother had opted to become a doctor instead of taking over the family business. In addition to being a master brewer at a fifth-generation sake brewery, Imada is known for exploring heirloom rice varieties to use in her brewing. "For two decades, as part of her quest to craft a sake that reflects Hiroshima’s distinct climate and agricultural heritage, or terroir, she’s been single-handedly reviving the heritage strain. 'I was the only one who revived it, and even today I remain the only one who uses this rice in sake,' she says. The revival has required Imada to retrace Hiroshima’s sake history. She’s worked with local farmers to cultivate a seed they haven’t sowed in a century, and used trial and error to rediscover the perfect brewing process for a once-common, now-forgotten rice, whose folk roots make it less predictable than standardized modern cultivars."

Before becoming a brewer at aged 33, Imada studied law at Meiji University and worked in Noh theater in Tokyo. Noh is a traditional form of Japanese musical theatre that dates to the 14th century and one of the oldest forms of theater. After graduating from Meiji University, she began working for the cultural activities section in a Tokyo department store.

== History ==
Women have worked in sake brewing since ancient times and there are several stories of Kuchikamizake (mouth-chewed sake). "According to ancient sake lore women were the first makers of sake, and the earliest sake makers of the Yayoi period (BC 300 - AD 300). Shrine maidens called miko, they brewed the beverage as an offering to the gods, employing a primitive method that involved chewing and spitting rice and letting the body's own enzymes do the work of fermentation." Chewing and the saliva broke down the starch in the rice into glucose, and airborne yeast transformed the glucose into a basic form of sake. There are around 30 female tojis in Japan, but when Imada started brewing there were only a few; her dedication has been a model for other women in the industry, though she is always clear in interviews that she did not face gender discrimination in her work.

Imada was in the 2019 documentary Kampai! Sake Sisters.

== Awards ==
Imada was on the list of the BBC's 100 Women announced on 23 November 2020.
