= Miyo =

- Gender: Female

Origin
- Origin: Japanese
- Meaning: Different meanings depending on the kanji used

Miyo (written: 美代 or 美余) is a feminine Japanese given name. Notable people with the name include:

- Miyo Ichikawa (市川 美余; born 1989), Japanese actress
- Miyo Miyashita (宮下 美代; born 1931), Japanese hurdler
- Miyo Okamoto (岡本 三代; born 1978), Japanese football manager
- Miyo Yoshida (吉田 実代; born 1988), Japanese professional boxer

Miyō or Miyou (written: 美葉) is a separate given name, though it may be romanized the same way. Notable people with the name include:

- Miyo Yamada (山田 美葉; born 1976), Japanese handball player

== Fictional characters ==
- Miyo Inbami (陰喰 三欲), a character in the manga series Kakegurui – Compulsive Gambler
- Miyo Kurahashi (倉橋 美代), a character in the light novel series Tokyo Ravens
- Miyo Masuko (増子 美代), a character in the anime series HappinessCharge PreCure!
- Miyo Takano (鷹野 三四), a character in the sound novel Higurashi no Naku Koro ni
