= Mijo Mihaljčić =

Serbian fashion model (born 1992)

- Born: Mila Mihaljčić; 5 June 1992 (age 34); Belgrade, FR Yugoslavia
- Years active: 2006–present
- Modeling information
- Height: 1.80 m (5 ft 11 in)
- Hair color: Brown
- Eye color: Brown
- Agency: Elite Model Management (Milan, Copenhagen); Seeds Management (Berlin); East West Models (Frankfurt); A Management; Stockholmsgruppen (Stockholm)

Mila "Mijo" Mihaljčić (Serbian Cyrillic: Мила "Мијо" Михаљчић; born 5 June 1992) is a Serbian fashion model.

== Early life ==
Mila Mihaljčić was born during a wartime period in Belgrade, Serbia. She has two siblings, an older brother and younger sister. She also has Native American ancestry. Mihaljčić had wanted to be a fashion model ever since she was 5 years old.

== Career ==
After modeling locally since age 14, and attending university to study law, in November 2012, Mihaljčić was sent to New York by her mother agent to meet with IMG Models, and was signed within 10 minutes. The next year, she debuted at BCBG Max Azria, which she closed; she walked some 50 shows for brands including Burberry (the first Serbian to do so), Chanel, Narciso Rodriguez, Reem Acra, Christopher Kane, Y-3, Missoni, Calvin Klein, 3.1 Phillip Lim, Altuzarra, rag & bone, Proenza Schouler, Céline, Dries van Noten, Sass and Bide, Victoria Beckham, Valentino, and opened for Maison Martin Margiela among others. In addition, she has walked for brands including Balenciaga, Elie Saab, Chloé, Versace, Akris, Dolce & Gabbana, Hermès, Louis Vuitton, Rodarte, Roberto Cavalli, and Salvatore Ferragamo.

She has appeared in advertisements for Zara, Tory Burch, Tommy Hilfiger, Prabal Gurung, and Belstaff.
