= Shōyama Station =

Railway station in Nichinan, Tottori Prefecture, Japan

Shōyama Station 生山駅
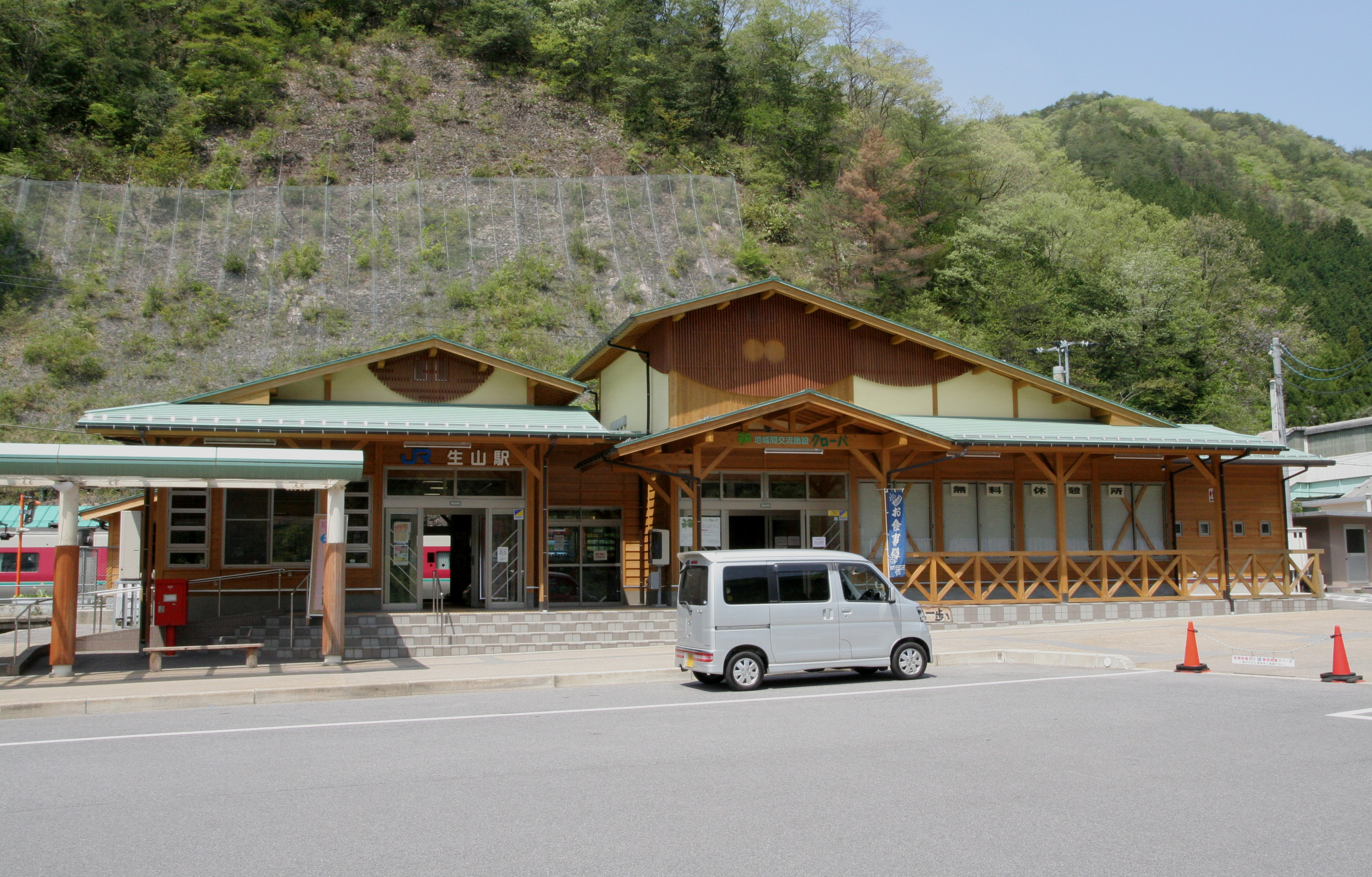
- Shōyama Station building, May 2008

General information
- Location: Shōyama, Nichinan-cho, Hino-gun, Tottori-ken 689-5211; Japan
- Coordinates: 35°10′14.49″N 133°19′18.83″E
- Operator: JR West
- Line: Hakubi Line
- Distance: 95.4 km (59.3 miles) from Kurashiki
- Platforms: 1 side + 1 island platform
- Tracks: 3

Construction
- Structure type: At grade

Other information
- Status: Unstaffed
- Website: Official website

History
- Opened: 28 November 1923

Passengers
- 2018: 194 daily
Location
- Location within Tottori Prefecture Location within Japan

Shōyama Station (生山駅, Shōyama-eki) is a passenger railway station located in the town of Nichinan, Tottori Prefecture, Japan. It is operated by the West Japan Railway Company (JR West).

== Lines ==
Shōyama Station is served by the Hakubi Line, and is located 95.4 kilometers from the terminus of the line at Kurashiki and 111.36 kilometers from Okayama.

== Station layout ==
The station consists of one ground-level side platform and one ground level island platform. The station building is connected with the island platform by a footbridge. The station is unattended.

=== Platforms ===
1	■ Hakubi Line	for Niimi and Okayama
2, 3	■ Hakubi Line	for Yonago

== Adjacent stations ==
«	Service	»
Hakubi Line
Himeji (One-way Operation)	West Express Ginga	Yonago
Kami-Iwami	Local	Kamisuge

== History ==
Shōyama Station opened on November 28, 1923. With the privatization of the Japan National Railways (JNR) on April 1, 1987, the station came under the aegis of the West Japan Railway Company.

== Passenger statistics ==
In fiscal 2018, the station was used by an average of 194 passengers daily.

== Surrounding area ==
- Japan National Route 183

== See also ==
- List of railway stations in Japan
