= Hiba-Dogo-Taishaku Quasi-National Park =

Quasi-National park in Japan

Hiba-Dōgo-Taishaku Quasi-National Park
- 比婆道後帝釈国定公園
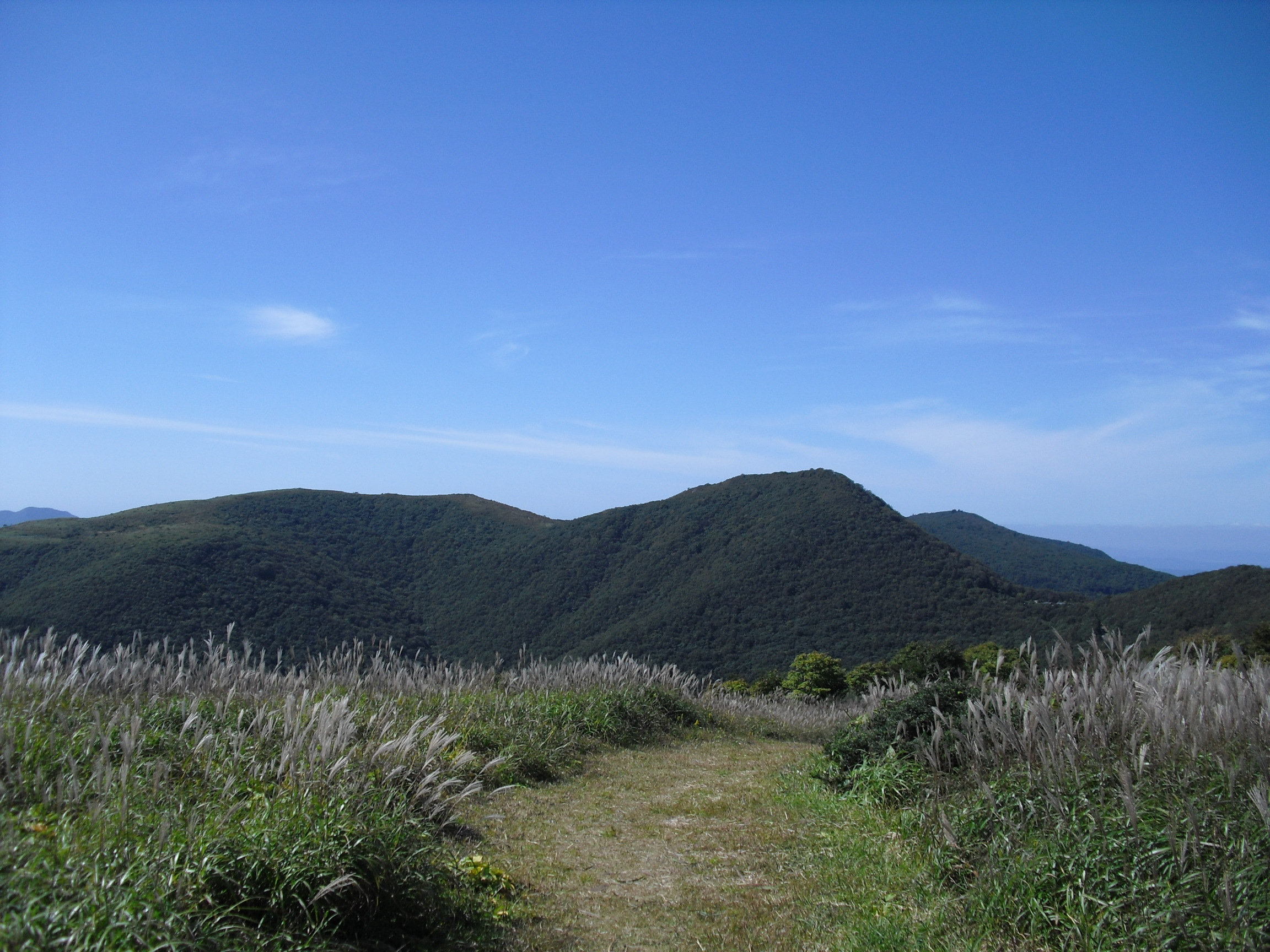
- Ikenodan (left) and Mount Tateeboshi (center) and Mount Hiba (background right) as seen from the southeast. Taken from Mount Ryuo.
- Interactive map of Hiba-Dōgo-Taishaku Quasi-National Park
- Location: Tottori/Shimane/Hiroshima Prefecture, Japan
- Nearest city: Shōbara, Hiroshima Prefecture
- Coordinates: 35°04′12″N 133°14′09″E
- Area: 78.08 square kilometres (78,080,000 m^{2})
- Established: July 24, 1963

Hiba-Dogo-Taishaku Quasi-National Park (比婆道後帝釈国定公園, Hiba-Dōgo-Taishaku Kokutei Kōen) is a Quasi-National Park that spans areas of Tottori Prefecture, Shimane Prefecture, and Hiroshima Prefecture, in the western part of the island of Honshu, Japan. It was founded on 24 July 1963 and has an area of 78.08 square kilometres (78,080,000 m^{2}). As its name suggests, the Hiba-Dogo-Taishaku Quasi-National Park is composed of a series of mountains and ravines in the middle of the Chūgoku Mountains. The park has virgin forests of Japanese beeches, Japanese oaks, Japanese horse-chestnuts and interesting ferns. Fauna include the Asiatic black bear, Japanese macaque, mountain hawk eagle and the Japanese giant salamander. Lake Shinryū is also a component of the park.

== Mountains ==
Noted mountains of the Hiba-Dogo-Taishaku Quasi-National Park are Mount Hiba (1,299 m (4,262 ft)), Mount Azuma (1,240 m (4,068 ft)), Mount Sentsū (1,142 m (3,747 ft)), and Mount Dōgo (1,271 m (4,170 ft)). According to the Kojiki, Mount Sentsū is noted for its association with the Susanoo myth, specifically his battle with Yamata no Orochi.

== Taishaku Ravine ==
The scenic Taishaku Ravine (帝釈峡, Taishaku-kyō) in Hiroshima Prefecture, an important part of the park, is formed by erosion caused by the Taishaku River. The Taishaku Ravine is fully 20 kilometres (12 mi) long.

== Recreation ==
Hiba-Dogo-Taishaku Quasi-National Park is a popular destination for hiking and skiing.

== See also ==
- List of national parks of Japan
