= Fugen Bosatsu Riding on a Elephant =

12th century National Treasure sculpture of Fugen Bosatsu in Japan

Fugen Bosatsu Riding on Elephant
- 木造普賢菩薩騎象像 (Mokuzou fugen bosatsukizōzō)
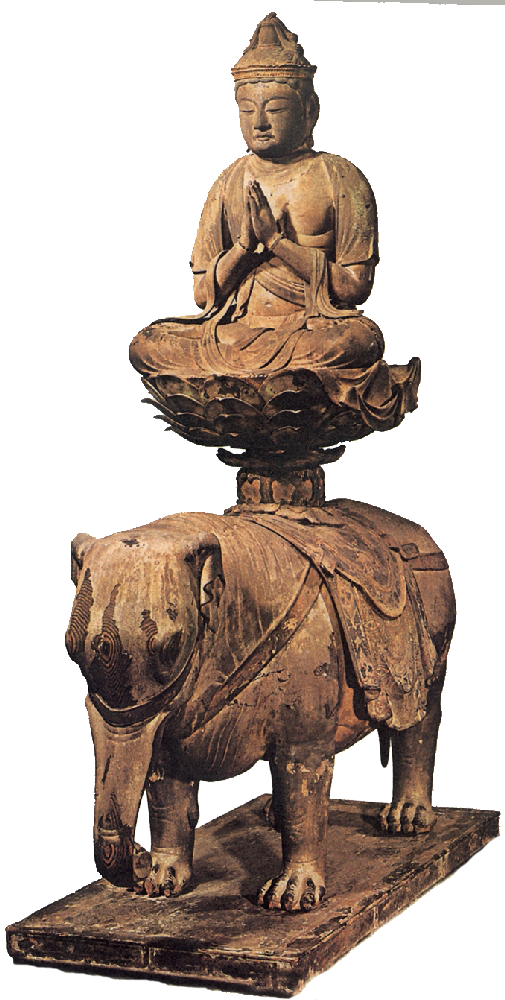
- Type: Japanese Buddhist Art
- Material: hinoki, kirikane gold leaf, pigment
- Height: Whole Statue: 141.6 cm Fugen: 55.8 cm (22.0 in)
- Created: 12th century
- Period/culture: Heian period
- Present location: Okura Museum of Art
- Classification: National Treasure
- Identification: 00112
- Culture: Insei era
- https://kunishitei.bunka.go.jp/heritage/detail/201/276

Fugen Bosatsu Riding on a Elephant, or Samantabhadra on Elephant (Japanese: 普賢菩薩騎象像) is a 12th century Japanese wooden Buddhist statue from the Heian period depicting the namesake bodhisattva riding an elephant on a lotus pedestal. Housed in the Okura Museum of Art, Tokyo it was designated a National Treasure of Japan since 1967, and is one of two National Treasure sculptures housed in Tokyo, the latter being a Shakyamuni statue in Jindai-ji. The Okura image is considered the standard representative sculpture of Fugen Bosatsu in Japanese art history studies.

== Provenance ==
The Meiji Restoration brought unprecedented changes to the Japanese art scene, and with it a new range of industrialists. At the turn of the century Ōkura Kihachirō, foudner of the Taisei Corporation (formerly Ōkura-gumi zaibatsu) started what would become the Ōkura Shukokan in 1917, Japan's first private museum, by building up a collection of Asian antiques, under the concern that many historic Japanese artworks were being exported, specifically to that of shinbutsu bunri.

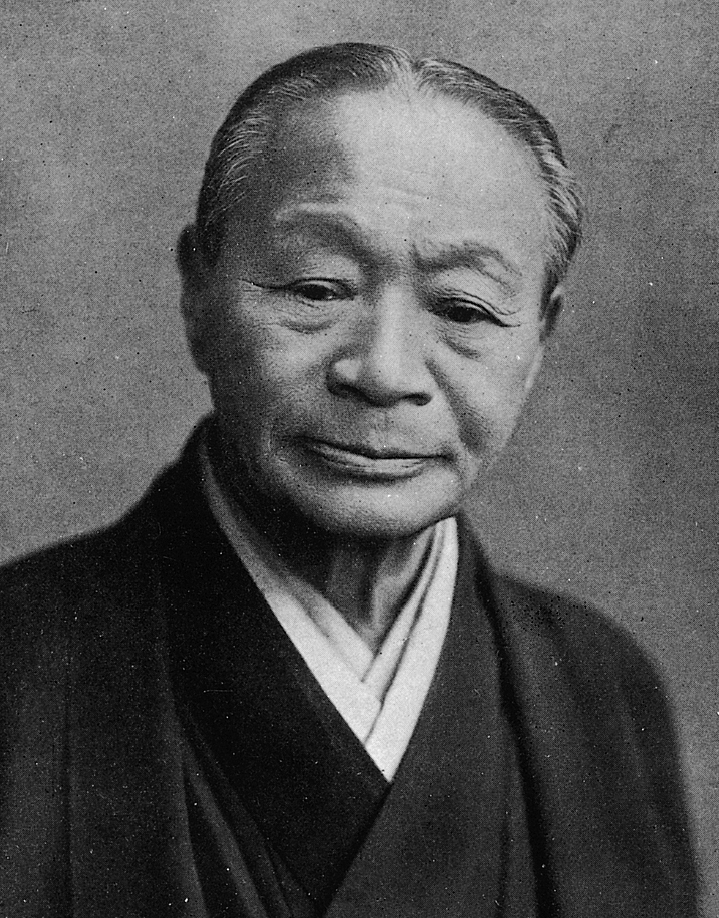
Ōkura Kihachirō (1837-1928)

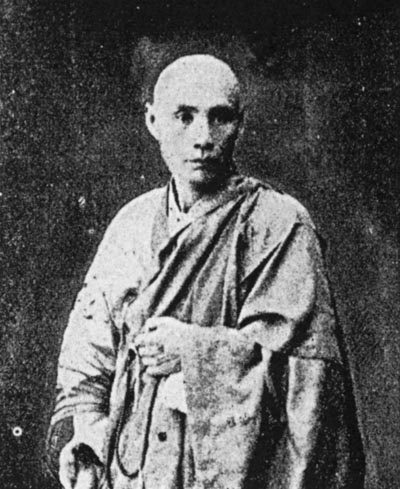
Machida Hisanari (1838-1897)

Prior to its acquisition by Ōkura during the middle of the Meiji era, the provenance of the sculpture remains unknown, although it is said to be similar in style to a sculpture of Amitābha housed in Anrakuju-in, Fushimi-ku, Kyoto, which is attributed to the Enpa School of Buddhist sculpture. Its counterpart depicted in hanging scroll format is a Heian period painting housed in the Tokyo National Museum (also National Tresasure) which US Marine turned art historian Sherwood F. Moran attributes as its "counterpart". The museum archives indicates that Ōkura acquired it from Machida Hisanari, a Satsuma Domain samurai and first director of the Tokyo National Museum. Due to Machida's close relationship and subsequent retirement and burial at Mii-dera, it is speculated that the statue may have close proximity to the monastery.

In 1900, the Fugen Bosatsu was on display at the Exposition Universelle of 1900 at the Japan pavilion, which showcased 381 prominent works across famous temples, shrines, and private collectors; the sculpture is catalogued as No. 214 on the Expo catalogue.

In 1923, 6 years after the opening of the Ōkura Museum, the Great Kantō Earthquake burned many of the Buddhist statues on display, however the Fugen survived as the museum's storehouse was untouched by the fires. The museum was reconstructed in 1928, to which the present structure and the statue also survived the ravages of World War II, such as the Bombing of Tokyo. It received the designation of Important Cultural Property on 19 January 1931, and was subsequently upgraded to its status as National Treasure on 15 June 1967, designated 00112, becoming the sole sculpture with that status in Tokyo until 2017, when a Hakuhō period sculpture of the Buddha from Jindai-ji received that designation.

== Description ==
Fugen-bosatsu Hanging Scroll, 12th century, Tokyo National Museum (National Treasure); Historian Sherwood F. Moran referred to it as the "counterpart".

Fugen Bosatsu (Samantabhadra) gained a following in Japan due to his essential role in the Avatamsaka Sutra and Lotus Sutra, an essential counterpart to Manjushri (Monju Bosatsu), serving as the attendant to The Buddha, and is commonly seen as riding an elephant according to the Lotus Sutra.

Though depicted as a masculine deity, it has feminine features, and that the style of the sculpture is consistent of the late Insei (Fujiwara) period of the Heian court, which focused on refined beauty in contrast to the "dash and vigor" of Kamakura period art, emphasized by the bodhisattva's rounded lips and small pointed chin. Fugen himself measures 1 ft 10 in, with the total height complete with the elephant measuring 4 ft 7.75 in. It is made of hinoki and utilizes yosegi-zukuri style construction, of which Moran identified 19 pieces to assemble Fugen, 50 pieces for the lotus pedestal, 14 pieces to connect the lotus to the elephant, 4 pieces of the elephant's saddle, and 12 pieces of the elephant itself, to which the entire sculpture is composed of 99 parts. Moran also noted that the elephant is composed and structured naturally, though its legs are short as a hippo, and that its sculptor conceived of the image without seeing the animal, much like Albrecht Dürer's image of a rhinoceros.

The bodhisattva was originally painted white, but the paint has faded and stained to a reddish brown profile, with his chin, nose, hands, arms and feet blackened. The elephant too, was originally white, but with age acquired a gray-ish tone. The delicate kirikane (gold leaf) patterning of Fugen's drapes, and the kinpaku (gold leaf) of the elephant's eyes, as well as the harness remains preserved, though the red and green pigment that once accompany it too has faded away.

Throughout the 1900s-1950s, restoration work and photos of the Fugen Bosatsu indicate that the petals of the lotus pedestal was altered, shifting from a "fish scale" pattern to a "scattered" pattern. It is believed that the discovery of the Amida pedestal at Phoenix Hall of Byōdō-in, Uji provided the contemporary reference for the re-arrangement of the petals by conservators. Repairs of the statue was completed from 1954, 1955, and 1958.

=== Past Exhibitions ===
The statue, once on permanent display, shifted towards a rotating display at the Okura Museum, with public display on 2019, 2020, 2021, 2023, 2025 (Osaka City Museum of Fine Arts) and 2026.
