= Okura Museum of Art =

Museum of art in Tokyo, Japan

Okura Museum of Art 大倉集古館
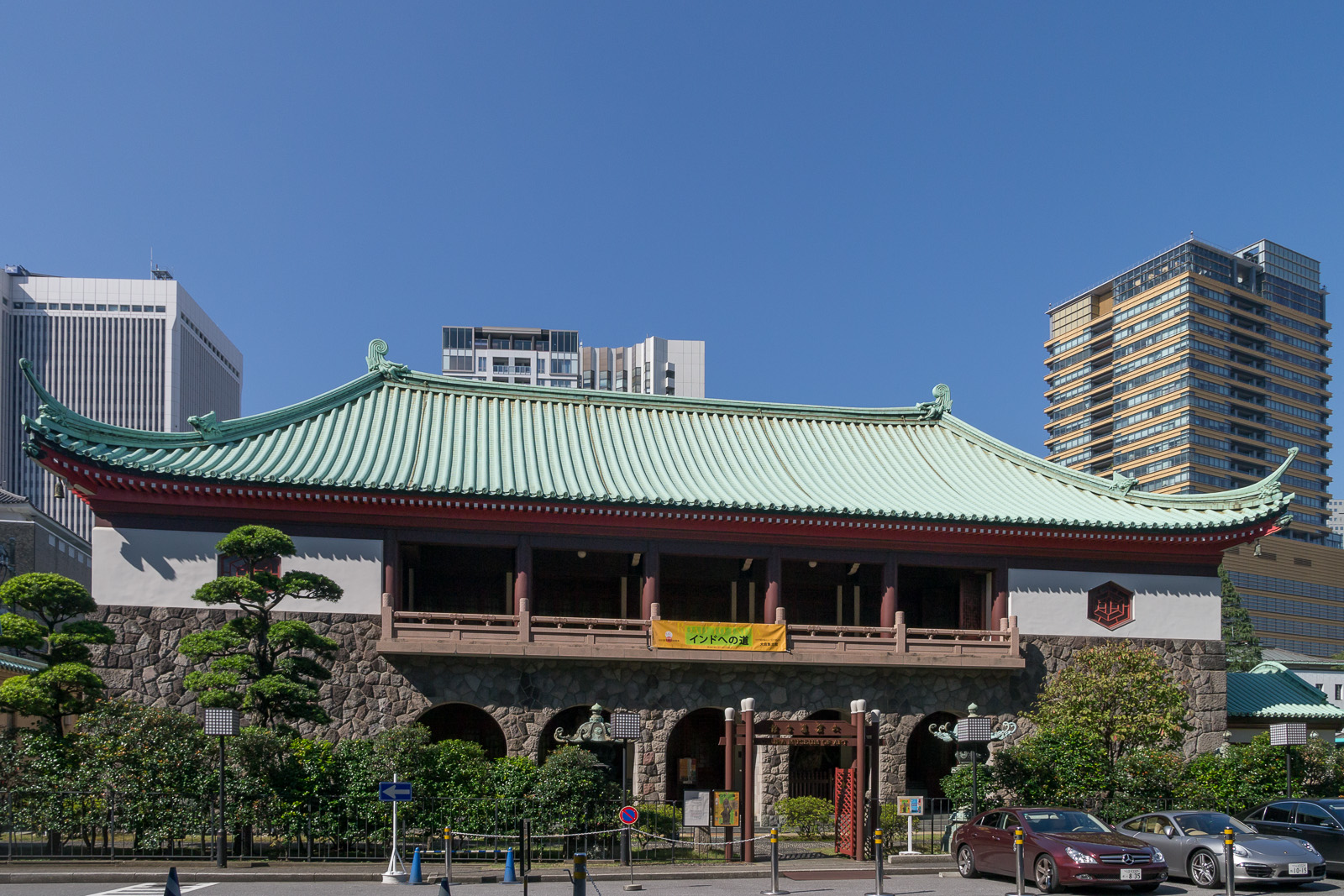
- Exhibition Hall (1927) by Itō Chūta; reinforced concrete with bronze roof; Registered Cultural Property
- Alternative names: Ōkura Shūkokan

General information
- Location: 2-10-3 Toranomon, Minato, Tokyo, Japan
- Coordinates: 35°40′1″N 139°44′36″E
- Opened: August 1917 / October 1928

Design and construction
- Architect: Itō Chūta
- Architecture firm: Ōkura Doboku

Website
- www.shukokan.org

Okura Museum of Art (大倉集古館, Ōkura Shūkokan) is a museum in Tokyo, Japan.

The museum opened in Toranomon, Tokyo in 1917 to house the collection of pre-modern Japanese and East-Asian Art amassed since the Meiji Restoration by industrialist Ōkura Kihachirō. The museum collection includes some 2,500 works, among which are three National Treasures and twelve Important Cultural Properties.

The museum is located within the grounds of the Hotel Okura Tokyo. Closed for renovation since April 1, 2014, the museum reopened alongside the rebuilt hotel in 2019.

== History ==
The Okura Museum of Art was the first private museum in Japan. The museum and all the exhibits on display were destroyed in the 1923 Great Kantō earthquake although works then in storage survived. The exhibition hall was rebuilt in 1927 by leading architect and architectural historian Itō Chūta and is a Registered Cultural Property. The museum collection was subsequently augmented by the founder's son, Ōkura Kishichirō.

Kihachiro Okura began collecting Japanese works of art to prevent them leaving the country during the turbulent times of the late 19th century. Thirty years later, he established the Okura Museum of Art (Okura Bijutsukan) on the grounds of his residence in Akasaka, Tokyo in 1902. Kihachiro collected a number of ancient artworks from across Japan and East Asia, including Fugen Bosatsu (Samantabhadra) on an Elephant. He also preserved several precious historical buildings. All of these were donated to the Okura Museum of Art (Okura Shokokan) in 1917 when it became the first art museum in Japan to be established by a private foundation. The building and many artworks were subsequently lost to fire in the Greek Kanto Earthquake of 1923. A new quake-and-fire-proof gallery was then built in classical Chinese style based on a design by the renowned architect Chuta Ito, with the museum opening again in 1928. Kihachiro's son Kishichiro later added to the museum's collection when he donated Equestrian Portraits of Court Nobles, Introduction to the Poetry Anthology Kokinwakashu, and a number of modern Japanese paintings.

== Collection ==
The three National Treasures in the collection are a Heian-period wooden statue of Samantabhadra (Fugen Bosatsu in Japanese) riding on an elephant; a scroll painting Imperial Guard Cavalry (Zuijin Teiki Emaki in Japanese) dating to 1247; and a copy of the preface to the Kokinshū attributed to Minamoto no Shunrai. Losses in the 1923 earthquake include one of the dry lacquer statue group of the Ten Great Disciples of which six survive at Kōfuku-ji (National Treasures).

== Publications ==
The museum has published a number of books about its collection and special exhibitions, including the following:

- 100 Masterpieces of Okura Museum of Art (2019)
- Peach Blossoms Shangli-La: Okura Museum of Art Renewal Open Special Exhibition (2019)
- A Guide to the Okura Museum of Art (2019)
- Hatanaka Kokyo Collection: Enchanted by Indian Textiles - The Cloths That Spread Into the World (2023)
- 150th Anniversary of the Founding of Okura&Co: The Encounters of the Greats - Calligraphy and Words in Modern Japan and China (2023)
- Okura Museum of Art Collection of Works by Mori Togaku (2024)
- Paintings of Beautiful Women and Shunga by Ukiyo-e Masters (2024)

== See also ==
- List of National Treasures of Japan (paintings)
- List of National Treasures of Japan (sculptures)
- List of National Treasures of Japan (writings: Japanese books)
- List of Important Cultural Properties of Japan (Shōwa period: structures)
