= Hotel Okura Tokyo =

Hotel in Tokyo, Japan

The Okura Tokyo
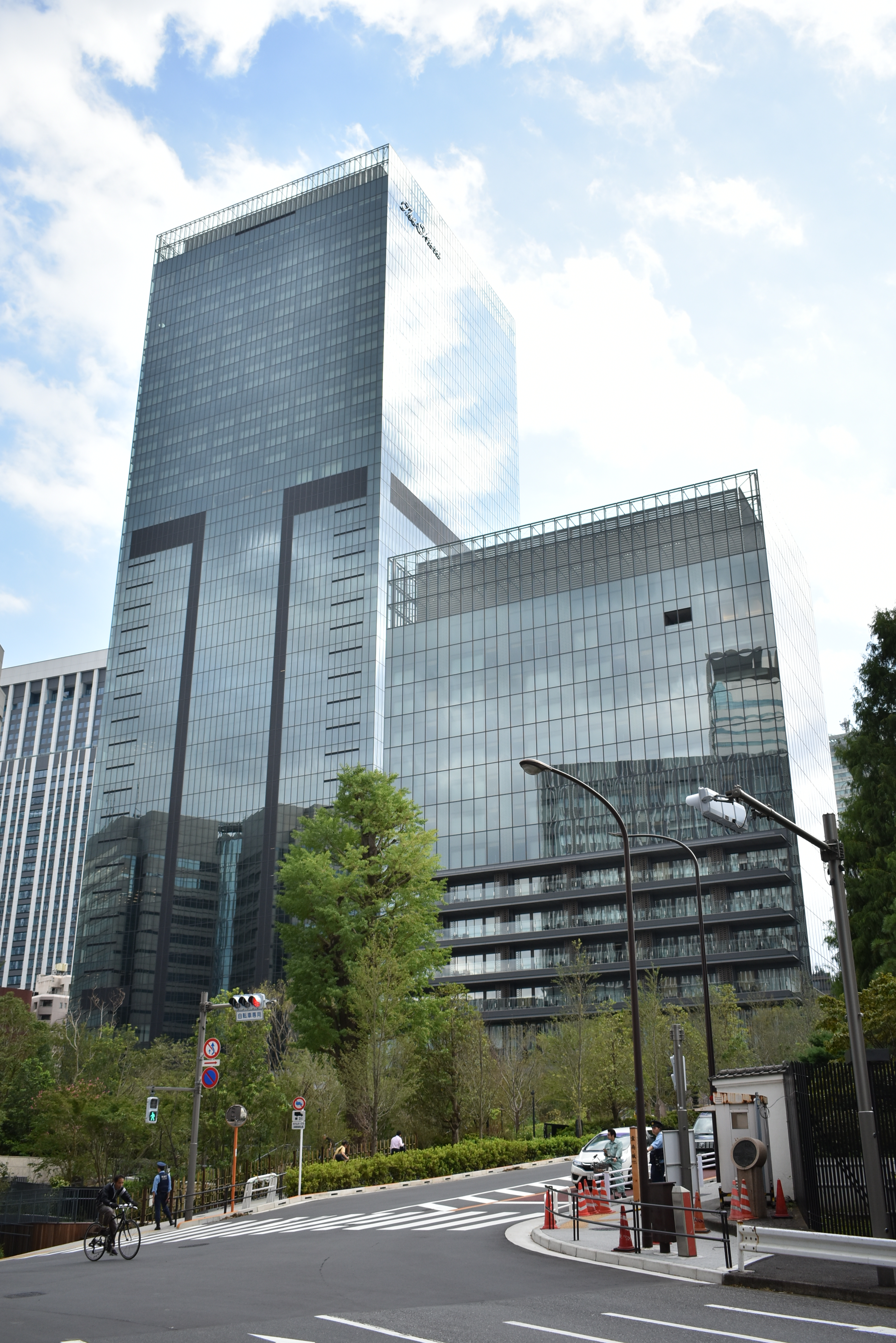
- The Okura Tokyo, September 2019

General information
- Location: Tokyo, Japan, 2-10-4 Toranomon, Minato-ku
- Coordinates: 35°40′01″N 139°44′39″E
- Opening: 20 May 1962
- Operator: Okura Hotels

Other information
- Number of rooms: 508

Website
- Official website

Hotel Okura Tokyo (ホテルオークラ東京, Hoteru Ōkura Tōkyō) is a luxury hotel opened in 1962 in Minato, Tokyo, Japan. It is operated by Okura Hotels and is a member of The Leading Hotels of the World. The historic main wing was demolished in 2015, with a modern replacement on the site opening in 2019, rebranded as The Okura Tokyo.

The Hotel Okura Tokyo (now The Okura Tokyo), the Imperial Hotel, Tokyo, and the Hotel New Otani Tokyo, are often referred to as one of the Three Great Hotels (御三家, gosanke) of Tokyo, in a reference to the three Edo-era branch houses of the Tokugawa clan.

The hotel grounds also host the Okura Museum of Art, which houses a collection of Japanese and East Asian art amassed by industrialist Ōkura Kihachirō.

== History ==
=== First building (1962–2015) ===
Designed by Yoshiro Taniguchi, the historic 408-room Main Wing opened on 20 May 1962. The 388-room South Wing opened on 26 November 1973. The hotel is located near the United States Embassy in the Akasaka area, and hosted every President of the United States since Richard Nixon, as well as numerous other foreign heads of state. The South Wing can be cut off from the rest of the building to serve as lodging for reporters and logistics aides, while using the penthouse "Imperial Suite" as high-security VIP lodging.

The hotel became a member of Pan Am's Intercontinental Hotels division on 1 June 1964, and would remain part of the chain until 1972, though it was never branded as an Intercontinental. The hotel has appeared in novels such as 1Q84 by Haruki Murakami, and The Ninja by Eric Van Lustbader. In Ian Fleming's novel You Only Live Twice, James Bond stays at the Okura while in Tokyo. In the movie Walk, Don't Run, Sir William Rutland (Cary Grant) tries to check in at the fully-booked Okura two days before the 1964 Olympics in Tokyo.

The hotel has also been the site of several major international summits, and has also provided catering to international summits held off-site. In 1976, JVC chose the Okura Hotel for the launch of the world's first VHS videocassette recorder.

The original Main Wing closed in August 2015 for demolition, leaving only the smaller South Tower operating. The demolition plans were met with dismay by travel journalists, like Tyler Brûlé, who called the original "a masterpiece" and "one of the most loved modernist hotels in the world". Others lamented the irony of the iconic building and its "Orchid Bar", a favourite meeting place for the foreign diplomats from the many embassies nearby, being demolished at a time when shows like Mad Men have made the modernistic style of the 1960s highly fashionable again. The outcry helped raise awareness of the significance of the original design, and many interior elements of the lobby were painstakingly transferred to or recreated within the new building by Yoshio Taniguchi, the son of the original designer.

=== Second building (2019–present) ===
Following a ¥110 billion (US$1 billion) construction project, the hotel opened two new towers, with a total of 508 rooms, on 12 September 2019, in anticipation of the 2020 Tokyo Olympics. The Okura Prestige Tower is a 188 m (617 ft) tall, 41-storey mixed-use tower with 368 modern international hotel rooms and 18 storeys of office space. The Okura Heritage Tower is an adjacent 75-metre, 17-storey tower offering 140 traditional Japanese guest rooms. The complex was designed and built by Taisei Corporation.

About half of the site is open to the public as a green area and plaza.

=== South Wing ===
The Hotel Okura's South Wing opened on 26 November 1973, built in a style similar to the 1962 main building. The 13-storey building was demolished between 2021–2022. Two buildings, a 180 m (590 ft) tall 43-storey apartment tower, and a 115 m (377 ft) tall 21-storey office tower, are currently planned for the site.

== Gallery ==
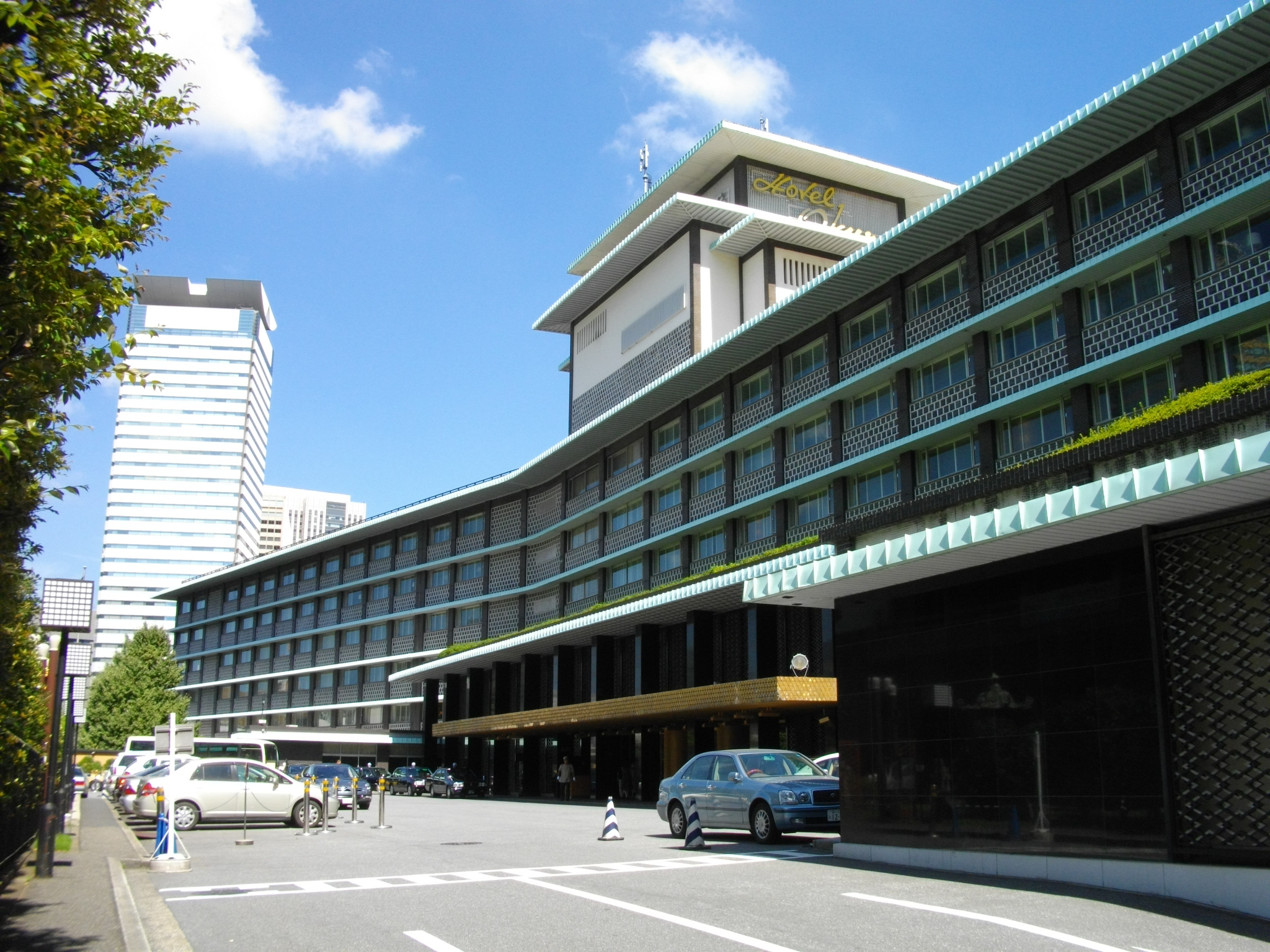
Exterior of the 1962 Main Wing, 2010

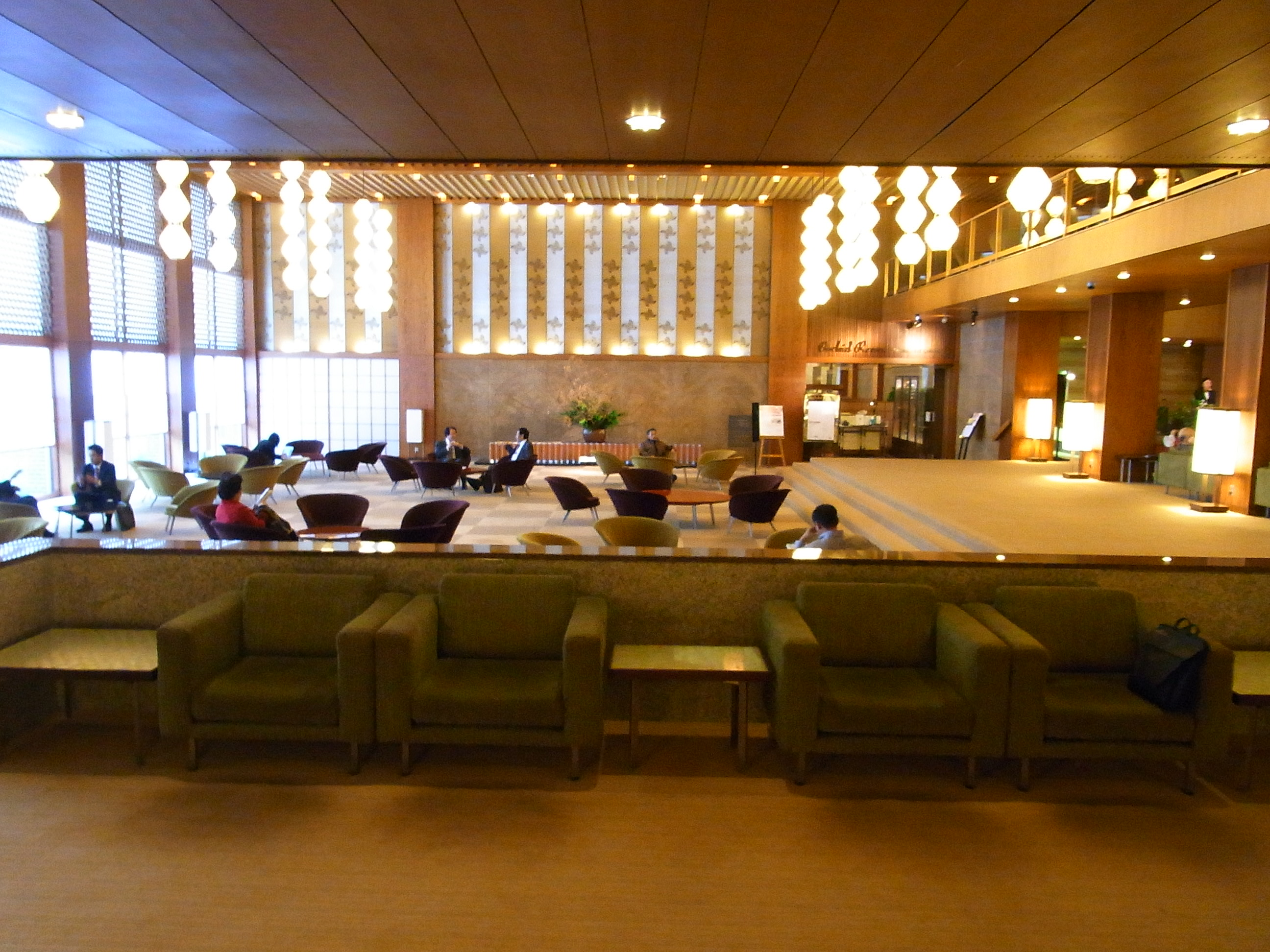
1962 Main Wing, lobby, 2010

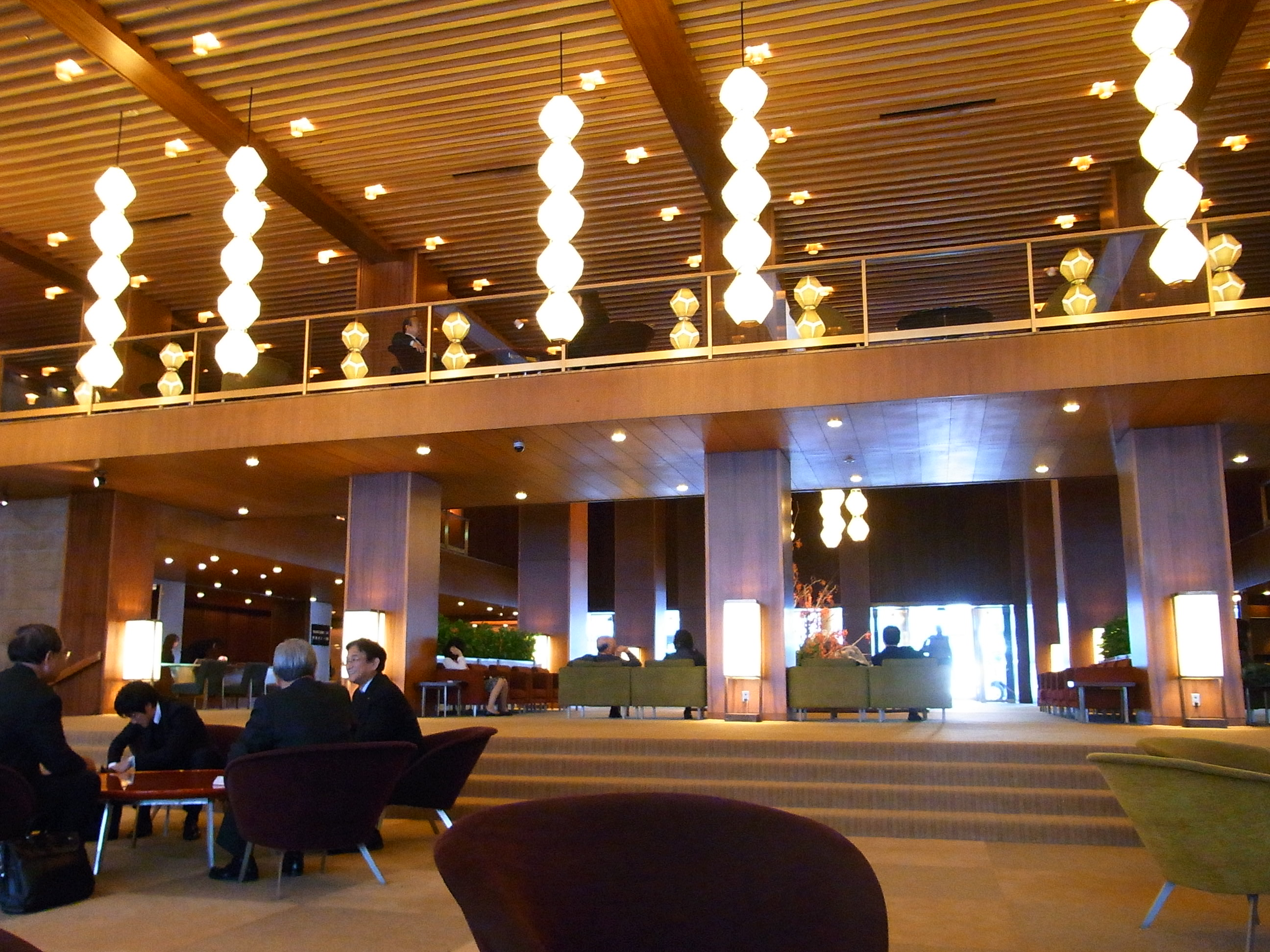
Lobby of the 1962 Main Wing, 2010

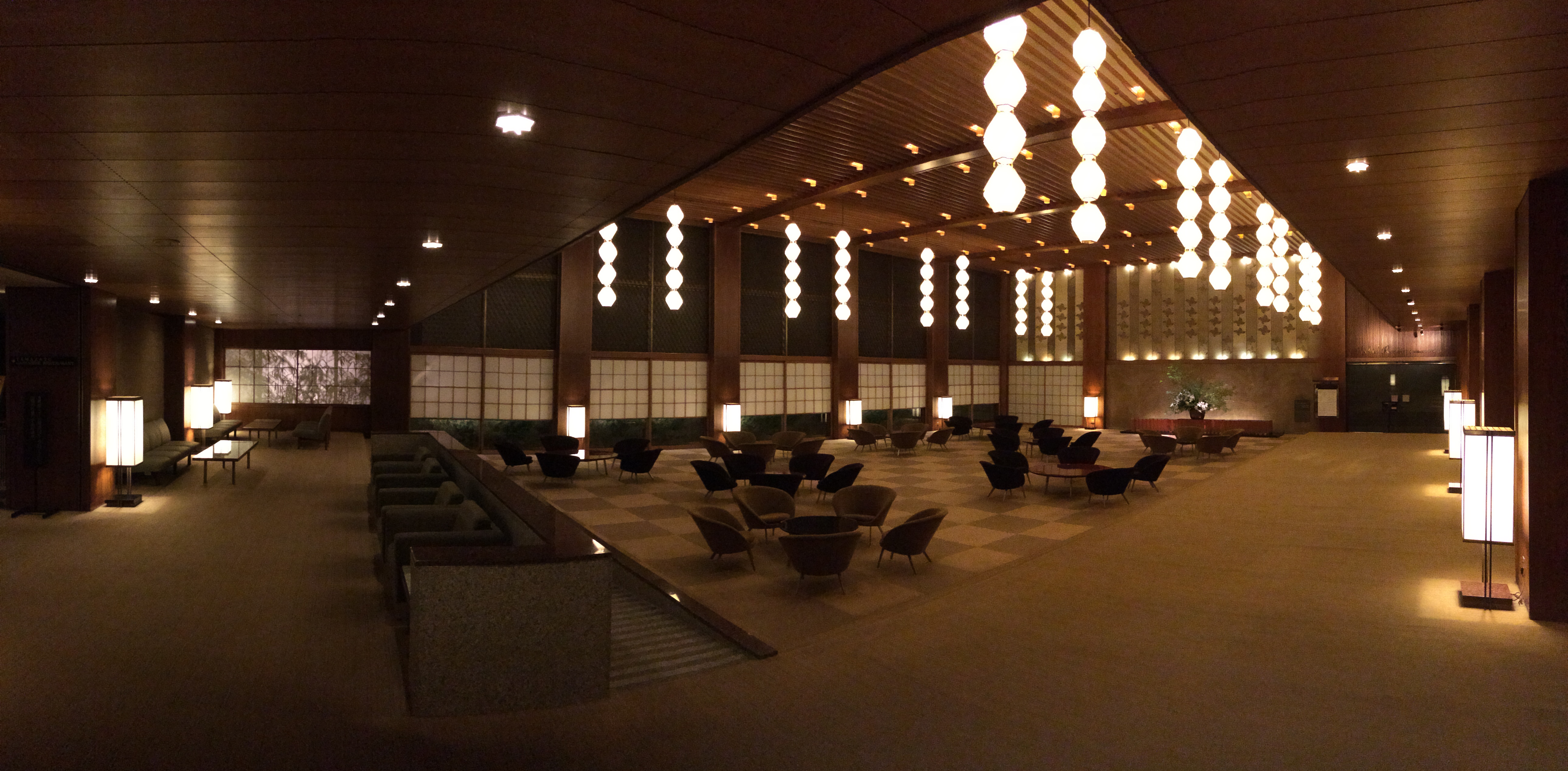
1962 Main Wing, Lobby, 2015

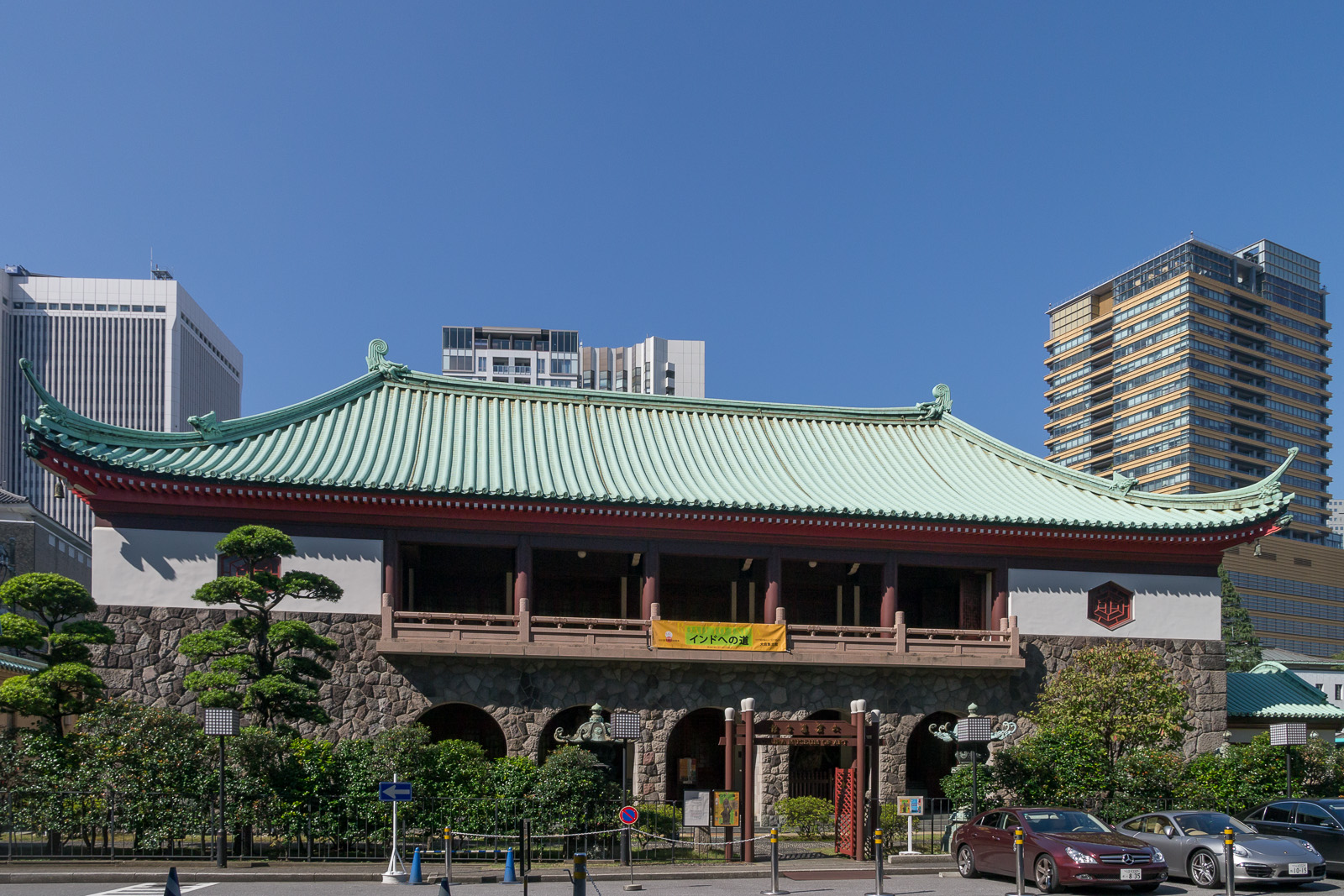
Okura Museum of Art, 2012

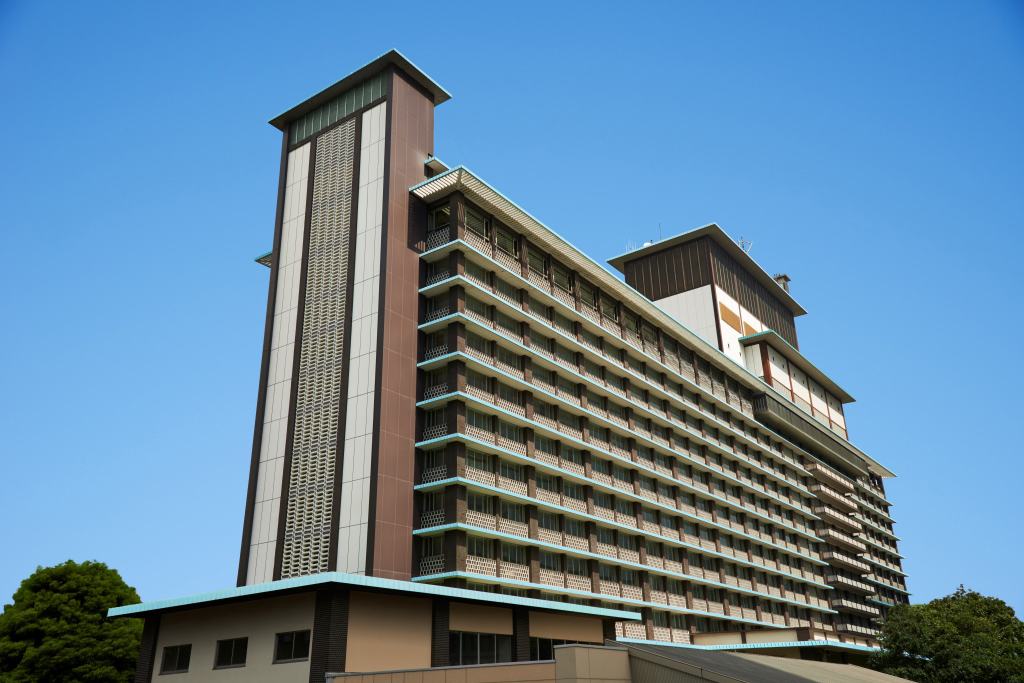
Exterior of the 1973 South Wing, 2015

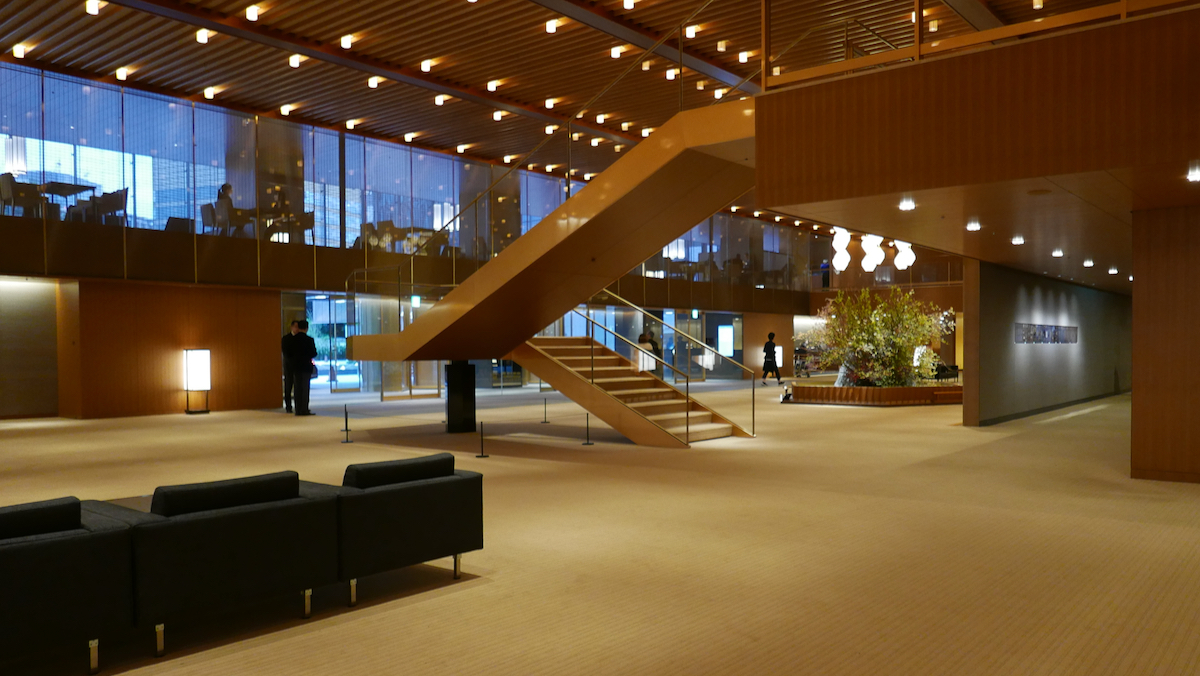
New Okura lobby, 2019

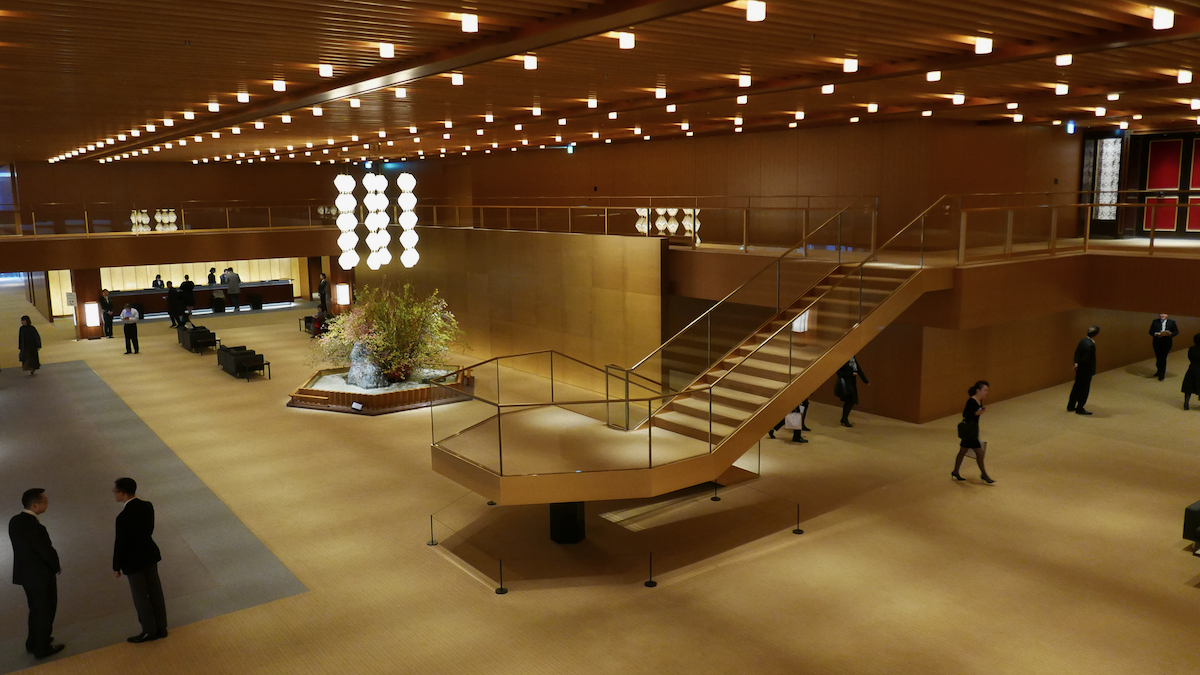
New Okura lobby, 2019

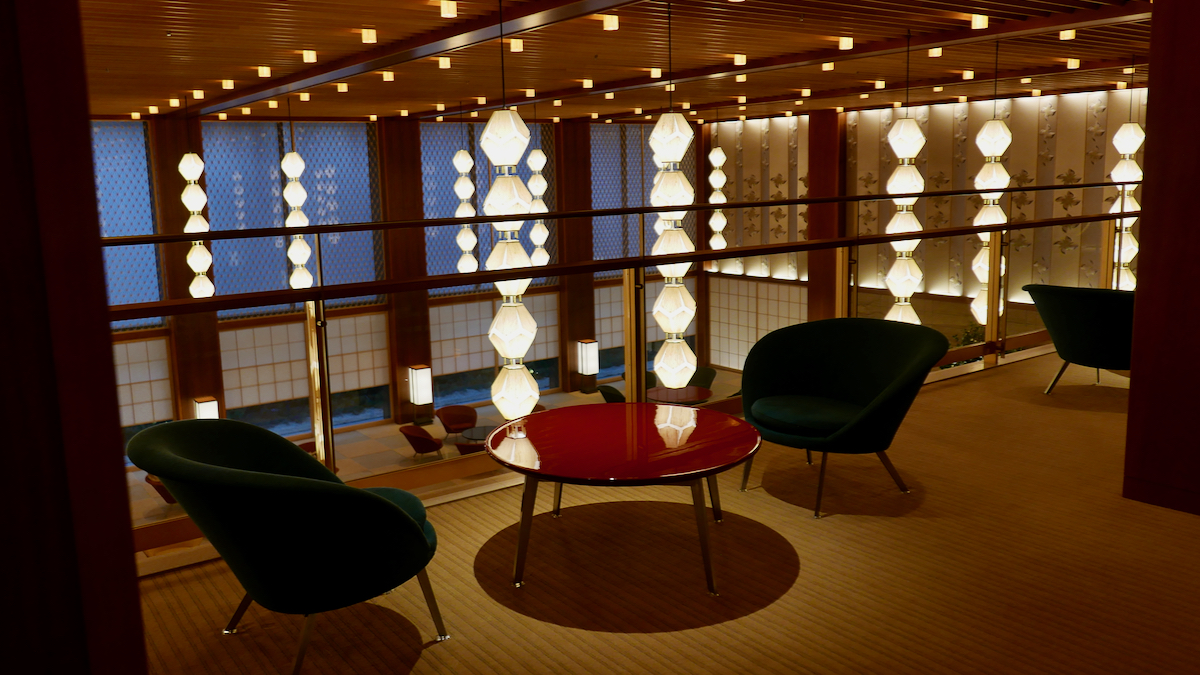
Okura mid century details, 2019

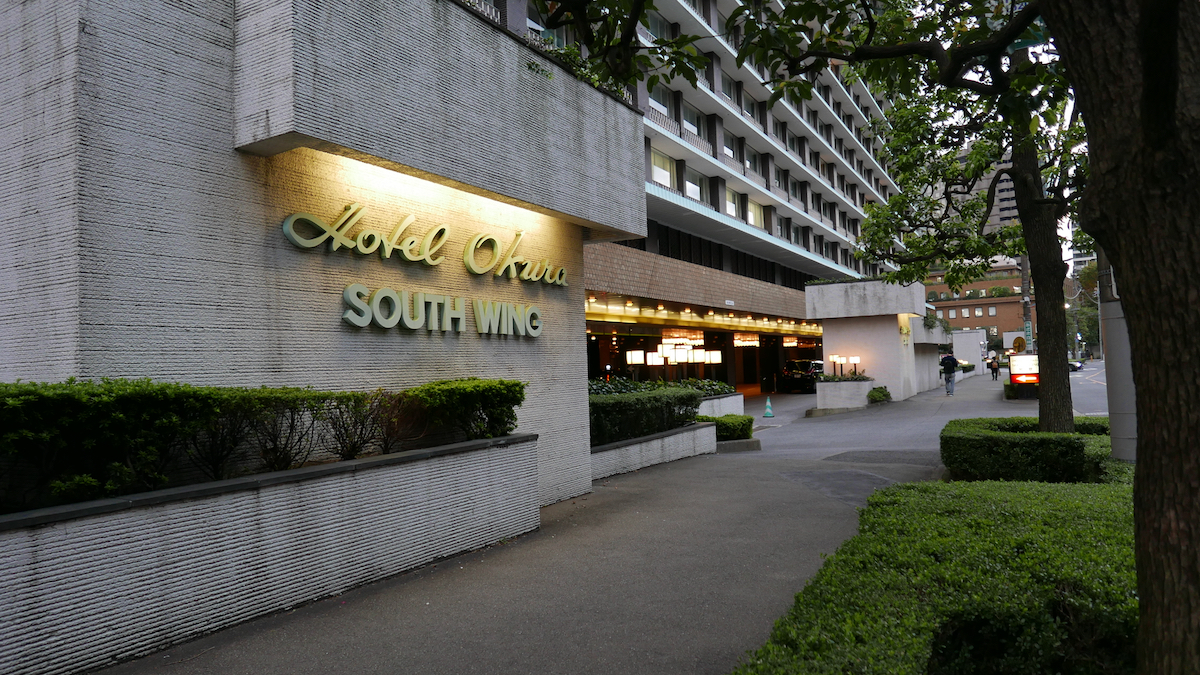
Okura south wing, 2019

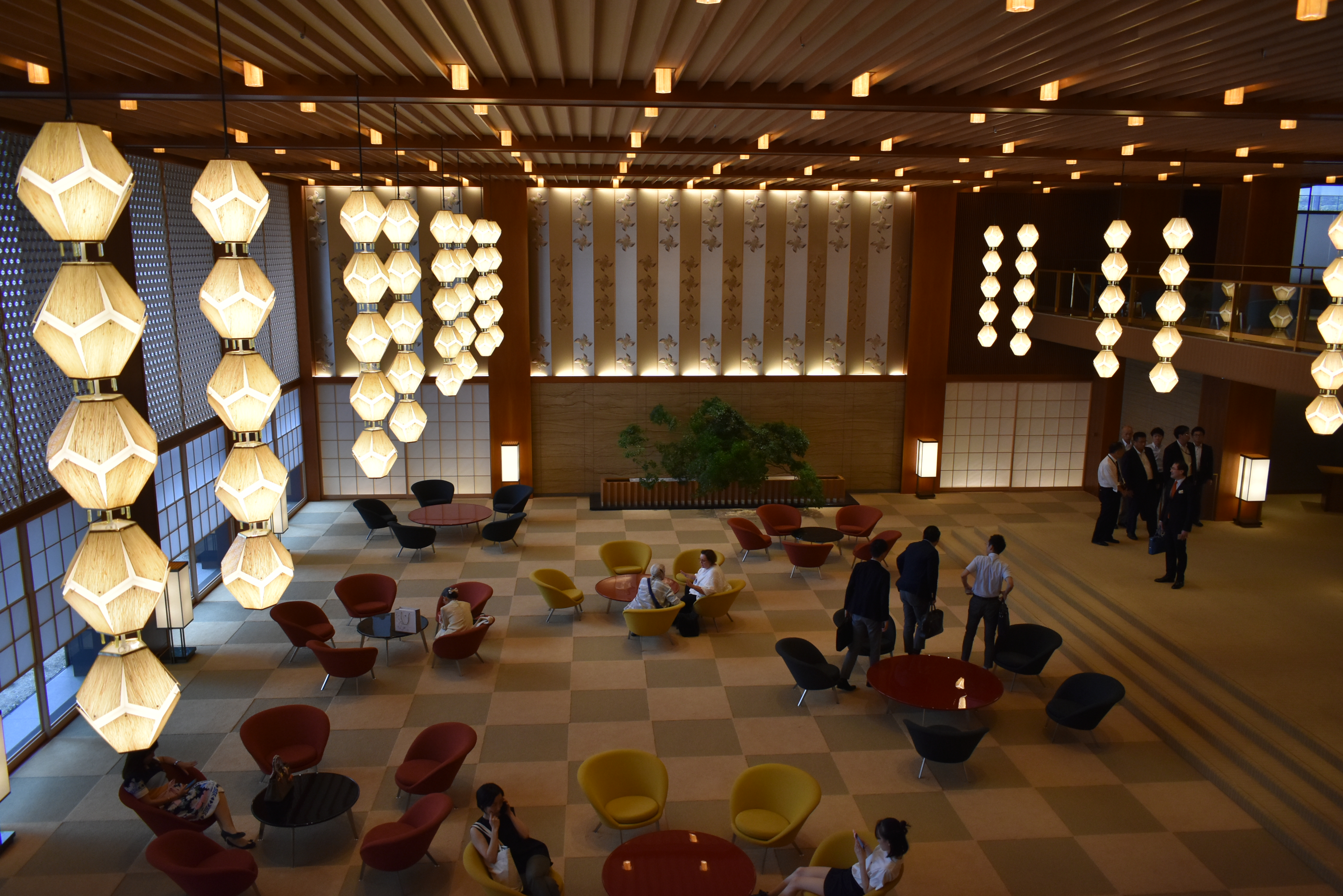
Lobby of the rebuilt 2019 hotel, 2019
