= List of important cultural properties of Japan (Taishō period: structures) =

This list is of Japanese structures dating from the Taishō period (1912–1926) that have been designated important cultural properties. As of October 2016, ninety-six properties with two hundred and twenty-seven component structures have been so designated.

== Structures ==
Structure	Date	Municipality	Prefecture	Comments	Image	Coordinates	Ref.
Former Temiya Railway Facilities 旧手宮鉄道施設 kyū-Temiya tetsudō shisetsu	1916-19	Otaru	Hokkaido	designation comprises six components, two from the Taishō period: the water tank (1916) and turntable (1919)		43°12′43″N 141°00′01″E	
Ōtani Hongan-ji Hakodate Betsu-in 大谷派本願寺函館別院; Ōtani-ha Honganji Hakodate betsu-in	1912-25	Hakodate	Hokkaido	designation comprises three components: the hondō (1915), shōrō, and main gate		41°45′47″N 140°42′50″E	
Hakodate Haristos Greek Orthodox Church 函館ハリストス正教会復活聖堂; Hakodate Harisutosu seikyōkai fukkatsu seidō	1916	Hakodate	Hokkaido	the sound of the church bell is one of the 100 Soundscapes of Japan		41°45′46″N 140°42′44″E	
Iwate University Department of Agriculture 岩手大学農学部（旧盛岡高等農林学校） Iwate daigaku nōgakubu	1912	Morioka	Iwate	designation comprises two components, one from the Taishō period: the former main building (1912)		39°42′49″N 141°08′20″E	
Former Takahashi Family Residence 旧高橋家住宅 kyū-Takahashi-ke jūtaku	1924	Ōshū	Iwate	designation comprises seven components, two from the Taishō period: two storehouses (1924)		39°08′29″N 141°08′23″E	
Chiba Family Residence 千葉家住宅; Chiba-ke jūtaku	1912-25	Tōno	Iwate	designation comprises five components, one from the Taishō period: the stone storehouse		39°20′27″N 141°26′30″E	
Kon Family Residence 金家住宅; Kon-ke jūtaku	1913-25	Kitaakita	Akita	designation comprises four components, two from the Taishō period: the western-style residence (1925) and rice storehouse (1913)		40°07′45″N 140°20′55″E	
Kodama Family Residence 小玉家住宅; Kodama-ke jūtaku	1923	Katagami	Akita	designation comprises four components: the residence, two storehouses, and garage		39°53′44″N 140°04′43″E	
Suzuki Family Residence 鈴木家住宅; Suzuki-ke jūtaku	1915	Ugo	Akita	designation comprises two components, one from the Taishō period: the storehouse		39°09′05″N 140°21′22″E	
Former Yamagata Prefectural Office and Assembly Hall 山形県旧県庁舎及び県会議事堂; Yamagata-ken kyū-kenchōsha oyobi kenkaigijidō	1916	Yamagata	Yamagata	designation comprises two components: the Former Yamagata Prefectural Office and Former Yamagata Prefectural Assembly Hall		38°15′24″N 140°20′28″E	
Former Takamatsunomiya Okinashima Villa 旧高松宮翁島別邸 kyū-Takamatsunomiya Okinashima bettei	1922	Inawashiro	Fukushima	designation comprises three components: two entrances and the kitchen		37°31′03″N 140°02′40″E	
Yokotone Lock 横利根閘門; Yokotone kō-mon	1921	Inashiki	Ibaraki			35°54′43″N 140°29′39″E	
Ishioka No.1 Power Plant Facility 石岡第一発電所施設; Ishioka dai-ichi hatsudensho shisetsu	1916	Takahagi	Ibaraki	designation comprises eight components, one from the Taishō period		36°47′30″N 140°39′18″E	
Former Nikkō Tamozawa Imperial Villa 旧日光田母澤御用邸 kyū-Nikkō Tamozawa go-yōtei	1912-25	Nikkō	Tochigi	designation comprises ten components, three from the Taishō period: two audience chambers (1921) and a room for the ladies-in-waiting		36°45′08″N 139°35′29″E	
Usui Pass Railway Facilities 碓氷峠鉄道施設; Usui-tōge tetsudō shisetsu	1912	Annaka	Gunma	designation comprises seventeen components, two from the Taishō period: the former Maruyama substation machinery and battery rooms; proposed for inscription on the UNESCO World Heritage List as a component of The Tomioka Silk Mill and Related Industrial Heritage		36°21′18″N 138°42′20″E	
Seishidō 誠之堂; Seishidō	1916	Fukaya	Saitama	designed by Tanabe Junkichi (田辺淳吉)		36°13′21″N 139°16′32″E	
Eitai Bridge 永代橋; Eitai-hashi	1926	Chūō	Tokyo			35°40′35″N 139°47′15″E	
Former Isono Family Residence 旧磯野家住宅 kyū-Isono-ke jūtaku	1912-13	Bunkyō	Tokyo	designation comprises two components: the residence (1912) and front gate (1913)		35°43′08″N 139°44′18″E	
Old Mikawashima Sewage Disposal Facilities 旧三河島汚水処分場喞筒場施設 kyū-Mikawajima osuishobunjō bonbujō shisetsu	1920-1	Arakawa	Tokyo	designation comprises seven components		35°44′17″N 139°47′07″E	
Former Shibusawa Family Asukayama Villa 旧渋沢家飛鳥山邸 kyū-Shibusawa-ke Asukayama-tei	1918-25	Kita	Tokyo	designation comprises two components: the Bankōro by Tanabe Junkichi (1918) and Seien Bunko Library (1925)		35°44′56″N 139°44′24″E	
Former Asakura Family Residence 旧朝倉家住宅 kyū-Asakura-ke jūtaku	1919	Shibuya	Tokyo	designation comprises two components: the main building and storehouse		35°38′51″N 139°42′03″E	
Jiyu Gakuen Myōnichikan 自由学園明日館; Jiyu Gakuen Myōnichikan	1921-5	Toshima	Tokyo	designation comprises four components, three from the Taishō period: the central building (1921), west classroom building (1922), and east classroom building (1925)		35°43′36″N 139°42′26″E	
Meiji Memorial Picture Gallery 聖徳記念絵画館; Seitoku kinen kaigakan	1926	Shinjuku	Tokyo			35°40′44″N 139°43′03″E	
Sensō-ji Denbō-in 浅草寺伝法院; Sensōji Denbōin	1918	Taitō	Tokyo	designation comprises six components, two from the Edo period, three from the Meiji period, and one from the Taishō period: the new Shoin		35°42′48″N 139°47′44″E	
Tokyo Station Marunouchi Building 東京駅丸ノ内本屋; Tōkyō-eki Marunouchi honya	1914	Chiyoda	Tokyo			35°40′53″N 139°45′58″E	
Meiji Jingū Treasure Museum 明治神宮宝物殿; Meiji Jingū hōmotsuden	1921	Shibuya	Tokyo	designation comprises thirteen components: the central, east, and west treasure houses, east and west corridors, east and west bridges, east and west crossings, north building, covered driveway, office, and main gate		35°40′48″N 139°41′53″E	
Yokohama Port Opening Memorial Hall 横浜市開港記念会館; Yokohama-shi kaikō kinen kaikan	1917	Yokohama	Kanagawa			35°26′50″N 139°38′28″E	
Igarashi Family Residence 五十嵐家住宅; Igarashi-ke jūtaku	1924	Aga	Niigata	designation comprises three components, one from the Taishō period: a storehouse		37°44′37″N 139°37′07″E	
Satō Family Residence 佐藤家住宅; Satō-ke jūtaku	1926	Sekikawa	Niigata	designation comprises six components, one from the Taishō period: the new living room		38°05′25″N 139°33′48″E	
Shiraiwa Dam Erosion Control Facility 白岩堰堤砂防施設; Shiraiwa entei sabō shisetsu	1919	Toyama	Toyama	designation comprises four components, one from the Taishō period: a side dam		36°32′55″N 137°32′04″E	
Former Kanazawa Arsenal 旧金澤陸軍兵器支廠 kyū-Kanazawa rikugun heikishō	1913-4	Kanazawa	Ishikawa	designation comprises three components, two from the Taishō period: the sixth (1913) and seventh (1914) arsenal buildings; now the Ishikawa Prefectural History Museum		36°33′30″N 136°39′45″E	
Chūya Family Residence 忠谷家住宅; Chūya-ke jūtaku	1915	Kaga	Ishikawa	designation comprises four components, two from the Taishō period: the new living room and new storehouse		36°21′04″N 136°18′28″E	
Nakamura Family Residence 中村家住宅; Nakamura-ke jūtaku	1913	Minamiechizen	Fukui	designation comprises ten components, one from the Taishō period: the new living room		35°49′38″N 136°04′04″E	
Yatsusawa Power Plant Facility 八ツ沢発電所施設; Yatsusawa hatsudensho shisetsu	1915	Ōtsuki, Uenohara	Yamanashi	designation comprises twenty components, three from the Taishō period: the Ōno regulating pond dam, floodgate, and spillway		35°36′49″N 138°57′45″E	
Former Matsumoto High School 旧松本高等学校 kyū-Matsumoto kōtō gakkō	1920-2	Matsumoto	Nagano	designation comprises two components: the main building (1920) and auditorium (1922)		36°13′52″N 137°58′55″E	
Former Tokidakan Reeling Facility 旧常田館製糸場施設 kyū-Tokidakan seishijō shisetsu	1912	Ueda	Nagano	designation comprises seven components, two from the Taishō period: the five-storey cocoon warehouse and cocoon processing building		36°23′38″N 138°15′19″E	
Ushibuse River Main Waterway 牛伏川本流水路（牛伏川階段工） Ushibuse-gawa honryū suiro (Ushibuse-gawa kaidankō)	1917	Matsumoto	Nagano			36°09′41″N 138°01′21″E	
Yomikaki Power Plant Facility 読書発電所施設; Yomikaki hatsudensho shisetsu	1922-3	Nagiso	Nagano	designation comprises three components: the power plant (1922-3), Kakizore aqueduct (1923), and Momosuke bridge (1922)		35°35′17″N 137°35′31″E	
Mino Bridge 美濃橋; Mino-hashi	1920	Mino	Gifu			35°33′08″N 136°54′38″E	
Former Nukada District Public Hall and Bussan Display Space 旧額田郡公会堂及物産陳列所 kyū-Nukada-kun kōkaidō oyobi Bussan chinretsusho	1913	Okazaki	Aichi	designation comprises two components		34°57′12″N 137°10′35″E	
Former Nagoya Court of Appeal Building 旧名古屋控訴院地方裁判所区裁判所庁舎 kyū-Nagoya kōsoin chihōsaibansho kusaibansho chōsha	1922	Nagoya	Aichi	now the Nagoya City Archives		35°10′53″N 136°54′37″E	
Toyohashi Orthodox Church 豊橋ハリストス正教会聖使徒福音者馬太聖堂; Toyohashi Harisutosu seikyōkai seishito fukuinsha matai seidō	1913	Toyohashi	Aichi			34°46′05″N 137°23′39″E	
Former Moroto Family Residence 旧諸戸家住宅 kyū-Moroto-ke jūtaku	1912-13	Kuwana	Mie	designation comprises two components: the Japanese-style (1912) and Western-style (1913) buildings		35°04′16″N 136°41′34″E	
Former Iba Family Residence 旧伊庭家住宅 kyū-Iba-ke jūtaku	1922	Ōtsu	Shiga	designation comprises six components, one from the Taishō period: the new living room		34°58′15″N 135°54′09″E	
Rokasansuisō 蘆花浅水荘; Rokasansuisō	1915-21	Ōtsu	Shiga	designation comprises six components: the outhouse (1915), storehouse (1919), Jibutsudō (1920), and front gate, main building, and connecting corridor (1921)		34°59′24″N 135°53′43″E	
Former Kyoto Central Nishijin Telephone Office Building 旧京都中央電話局西陣分局舎 kyū-Kyōto chūō denwa-kyoku Nishijin-bun kyokusha	1921	Kyoto	Kyoto			35°01′29″N 135°45′12″E	
Former Mitsui Family Shimogamo Villa 旧三井家下鴨別邸 kyū-Mitsui-ke Shimogamo bettei	1912-26	Kyoto	Kyoto	designation comprises three components, two from the Taishō period: the entrance building (1925) and chashitsu		35°01′54″N 135°46′19″E	
Seifūsō 清風荘; Seifūsō	1912-14	Kyoto	Kyoto	designation comprises twelve components		35°01′46″N 135°46′34″E	
Seiryūtei 清流亭; Seiryūtei	1913	Kyoto	Kyoto	designation comprises three components		35°00′49″N 135°47′27″E	
Umekōji Roundhouse 梅小路機関車庫; Umekōji kikan shako	1914	Kyoto	Kyoto			34°59′13″N 135°44′34″E	
Maizuru Chinjufu Water Supply Facilities 舞鶴旧鎮守府水道施設; Maizuru kyū-chinjufu suidō shisetsu	1921	Maizuru	Kyoto	designation comprises ten components, one from the Taishō period: the water intake dam on the lower stretches of the Kishitani River		35°26′44″N 135°26′37″E	
Nomura Hekiunsō 野村碧雲荘; Nomura Hekiunsō	1921	Kyoto	Kyoto	villa built for Tokushichi Nomura II in the grounds of Nanzen-ji; the gardens use water from Lake Biwa Canal; designation comprises seventeen components, including a Noh stage and chashitsu; six date from the Taishō era and the remainder from 1928		35°00′49″N 135°47′35″E	
Former Nishio Family Residence 旧西尾家住宅 kyū-Nishio-ke jūtaku	1926	Suita	Osaka	designation comprises seven components, two from the Taishō period: the east and west wings		34°45′24″N 135°31′24″E	
Osaka City Central Public Hall 大阪市中央公会堂; Ōsaka-shi chūō kōkaidō	1918	Osaka	Osaka			34°41′37″N 135°30′14″E	
Osaka Prefectural Library 大阪府立図書館; Ōsaka furitsu toshokan	1922	Osaka	Osaka	designation comprises three components, two from the Taishō period: the left and right wings		34°41′37″N 135°30′12″E	
Ijōkaku 移情閣; Ijōkaku	1915	Kobe	Hyōgo			34°37′48″N 135°02′04″E	
Former Yamamura Family Residence 旧山邑家住宅（淀川製鋼迎賓館） kyū-Yamamura-ke jūtaku (Yodogawa seikō geihinkan)	1924	Ashiya	Hyōgo	by Frank Lloyd Wright		34°44′23″N 135°18′00″E	
Former Murayama Family Residence 旧村山家住宅 kyū-Murayama-ke jūtaku	1912-26	Kobe	Hyōgo	designation comprises six components, three from the Taishō period: the shoin (1918), entrance (1918), and art storehouse		34°43′25″N 135°15′24″E	
Nunobiki Water Source Facilities 布引水源地水道施設; Nunobiki suigen-chi suidō shisetsu	1912-25	Kobe	Hyōgo	designation comprises nine components, one from the Taishō period: the Tanigawa Bridge		34°42′52″N 135°11′15″E	
Hase-dera Honbō 長谷寺本坊; Hase-dera honbō	1919-24	Sakurai	Nara	designation comprises eight components, six from the Taishō period: the great lecture hall (1919), inner shoin (1920), large entrance and kuri, small shoin, and Gomadō (1923), and karamon and kairō (1924)		34°32′01″N 135°54′28″E	
Former Nishimura Family Residence 旧西村家住宅 kyū-Nishimura-ke jūtaku	1914	Shingū	Wakayama			33°43′40″N 135°59′33″E	
Kotonoura Onzansō 琴ノ浦温山荘; Kotonoura Onzansō	1913-20	Kainan	Wakayama	designation comprises three components: the "hama-zashiki" (1913), main building (1915), and chashitsu (1920)		34°09′30″N 135°11′40″E	
Former Mitani Water Source Dam Water Supply Facility 旧美歎水源地水道施設 kyū-Mitani suigenchi entei suidō shisetsu	1922	Tottori	Tottori	designation comprises ten components, eight from the Taishō period: two weirs, four filtration ponds, and a well (1915) and the dam (1922)		35°29′11″N 134°17′15″E	
Ishitani Family Residence 石谷家住宅; Ishitani-ke jūtaku	1920-2	Chizu	Tottori	designation comprises eight components, three from the Taishō period: three storehouses		35°16′12″N 134°13′49″E	
Kadowaki Family Residence 門脇家住宅; Kadowaki-ke jūtaku	1914	Daisen	Tottori	designation comprises four components, one from the Taishō period: the new storehouse		35°29′01″N 133°27′57″E	
Former Taisha Station Honya 旧大社駅本屋 kyū-Taisha-eki honya	1920	Izumo	Shimane			35°23′12″N 132°41′25″E	
Former Ōhara Family Residence 旧大原家住宅 kyū-Ōhara-ke jūtaku	1912-25	Kurashiki	Okayama	designation comprises ten components, two from the Taishō period: two storehouses		34°35′48″N 133°46′15″E	
Shunbūkan Rai Family Residence 春風館賴家住宅; Shunbūkan Rai-ke jūtaku	1917	Takehara	Hiroshima	designation comprises five components, one from the Taishō period: a storehouse		34°20′49″N 132°54′35″E	
Honjō Water Source Dam Water Supply Facility 本庄水源地堰堤水道施設; Honjō suigenchi entei suidō shisetsu	1916	Kure	Hiroshima	designation comprises three components: the dam and two wells		34°18′25″N 132°33′44″E	
Former Mōri Family Main Residence 旧毛利家本邸 kyū-Mōri-ke hontei	1916-8	Hōfu	Yamaguchi	designation comprises twelve components: the main building, gate, gatehouse, stone bridge, kitchen, bathroom, maids' room, and four storehouses (1916) and image hall (1918); partly occupied by the Mōri Museum		34°03′48″N 131°35′15″E	
Former Yamaguchi Prefectural Office and Assembly Hall 山口県旧県庁舎及び県会議事堂; Yamaguchi-ken kyū-kenchōsha oyobi kenkaigijidō	1916	Yamaguchi	Yamaguchi	designation comprises two components: the Former Yamaguchi Prefectural Office and Former Yamaguchi Prefectural Assembly Hall		34°11′07″N 131°28′19″E	
Arichika Family Residence 有近家住宅; Arichika-ke jūtaku	1923-4	Yamaguchi	Yamaguchi	designation comprises seven components, three from the Taishō period: the main building and gate (1924) and warehouse (1923)		34°13′53″N 131°39′48″E	
Hiunkaku (Former Matsudaira Takamatsu Villa) 披雲閣（旧松平家高松別邸） Hiunkaku (kyū-Matsudaira-ke Takamatsu bettei)	1917-26	Takamatsu	Kagawa	designation comprises three components: the main building (1917) and two storehouses (1917, 1926)		34°21′01″N 134°03′06″E	
Iwaya-ji Daishidō 岩屋寺大師堂; Iwayaji Daishidō	1920	Kumakōgen	Ehime	Iwaya-ji is Temple 45 of the Shikoku pilgrimage		33°39′32″N 132°58′51″E	
Dōgo Onsen Main Building 道後温泉本館; Dōgo onsen honkan	1924	Matsuyama	Ehime	designation comprises four components, two from the Taishō period: the south wing and entrance (1924)		33°51′08″N 132°47′11″E	
Uchiko-za 内子座; Uchiko-za	1916	Uchiko	Ehime			33°33′05″N 132°39′01″E	
Toshima Family Residence 豊島家住宅; Toshima-ke jūtaku	1917	Matsuyama	Ehime	designation comprises seven components, one from the Taishō period: the rice storehouse (1917)		33°47′53″N 132°46′49″E	
Bansuisō (Former Hisamatsu Family Villa) 萬翠荘（旧久松家別邸） Bansuisō (kyū-Hisamatsu-ke bettei)	1922	Matsuyama	Ehime	designation comprises two components: the main building and estate manager's lodge (1922)		33°50′33″N 132°46′06″E	
Former Sekikawa Family Residence 旧関川家住宅 (高知県高知市一宮) kyū-Sekikawa-ke jūtaku (Kōchi-ken Kōchi-shi Ichinomiya)	1912-25	Kōchi	Kōchi	designation comprises four components, one from the Taishō period: the tool storehouse (1912–25)		33°35′16″N 133°34′26″E	
Yanase Forest Railway Facilities 旧魚梁瀬森林鉄道施設 kyū-Yanase shinrin tetsudō shisetsu	1913-26		Kōchi	designation includes fourteen component tunnels and bridges, four from the Meiji period, five from the Taishō period (Kamagatani Bridge (1926), Ochiai Bridge (1925), estuary tunnel (1913), Inubō Bridge (1924), and Inoya Bridge (1924)), and five from the Shōwa period		33°29′15″N 134°00′09″E	
Former Moji Mitsui Club 旧門司三井倶楽部 kyū-Moji Mitsui kurabu	1921	Kitakyushu	Fukuoka	designation comprises two components: the main building and Fuzoku-ya (1921)		33°56′45″N 130°57′45″E	
Imamura Catholic Church 今村天主堂; Imamura tenshudō	1913	Tachiarai	Fukuoka			33°22′14″N 130°35′57″E	
South Kawachi Bridge 南河内橋 minami Kawachi bashi	1926	Kitakyushu	Fukuoka			33°49′38″N 130°48′04″E	
Mojikō Station Main Building 門司港駅 (旧門司駅) 本屋; Mojikō eki (kyū-Mojikō eki) honkan	1914	Kitakyushu	Fukuoka			33°56′42″N 130°57′41″E	
Takeo Onsen New Building and Rōmon 武雄温泉新館及び楼門; Takeo onsen shinkan oyobi rōmon	1914	Takeo	Saga	designation comprises two components: the new building and rōmon		33°11′48″N 130°00′52″E	
Hario Wireless Telegraph Station 旧佐世保無線電信所（針尾送信所）施設 kyū-Sasebo musen denshin-sho (Hario sōshinjo) shisetsu	1922	Sasebo	Nagasaki	designation comprises three components: the three wireless towers, the telegraph room, and an oil storehouse		33°04′04″N 129°45′00″E	
Egami Church 江上天主堂; Egami tenshudō	1918	Gotō	Nagasaki	inscribed on the UNESCO World Heritage List as part of the Hidden Christian Sites in the Nagasaki Region		32°51′19″N 128°54′15″E	
Tabira Church 田平天主堂; Tabira tenshudō	1918	Hirado	Nagasaki	proposed for inscription on the UNESCO World Heritage List as one of the Hidden Christian Sites in the Nagasaki Region		33°20′23″N 129°34′38″E	
Kashiragashima Church 頭ヶ島天主堂; Kashiragashima tenshudō	1919	Shinkamigotō	Nagasaki	included in the UNESCO World Heritage List as one of the Hidden Christian Sites in the Nagasaki Region		33°00′45″N 129°10′58″E	
Former Tamana Reclamation Facility 旧玉名干拓施設; Tamana kantaku shisetsu		Tamana	Kumamoto	designation comprises seven components, one from the Taishō period: the restoration and remodelling of the original facilities of 1895		32°51′56″N 130°31′39″E	
Mitsui Miike Coal Mine 三井石炭鉱業株式会社三池炭鉱旧万田坑施設; Mitsui sekitan kōgyō kabushikigaisha Miike tankō kyū-Manda ana shisetsu	1912-26	Arao, Ōmuta	Kumamoto, Fukuoka	designation comprises six components, two from the Taishō period: the office building and ritual facility		33°00′09″N 130°26′58″E	
Former Narikiyo Family Hiji Villa 旧成清家日出別邸 kyū-Narikiyo-ke Hiji bettei	1912-26	Hiji	Ōita	designation comprises five components		33°22′00″N 131°32′02″E	
Former Yoshimatsu Family Residence 旧吉松家住宅 kyū-Yoshimatsu-ke jūtaku	1919	Kushima	Miyazaki	designation comprises five components: the residence, three storehouses, and bath house		31°27′50″N 131°13′45″E	
Former Masuda Family Residence 旧増田家住宅 kyū-Masuda-ke jūtaku	1912-25	Satsumasendai	Kagoshima	designation comprises four components, two from the Taishō period: the stone warehouse (1912) and bath house and toilet		31°48′29″N 130°25′44″E	
Former Yonaguni Family Residence 旧与那国家住宅 kyū-Yonaguni-ke jūtaku	1913	Taketomi	Okinawa			24°19′43″N 124°05′15″E	
Nakandakari Hiijā 仲村渠樋川; Nakandakari hiijā	1912	Nanjō	Okinawa			26°08′43″N 127°47′34″E	

== See also ==
- Cultural Properties of Japan
- List of Important Cultural Properties of Japan (Shōwa period: structures)
