= Okraulo =

The Okraulo (Japanese: オークラウロ) is a vertical flute that is named after its inventor Baron Kishichiro Okura of the Hotel Okura in Tokyo, Japan.
