= Itō Chūta =

Japanese architect

Itō Chūta 伊東忠太
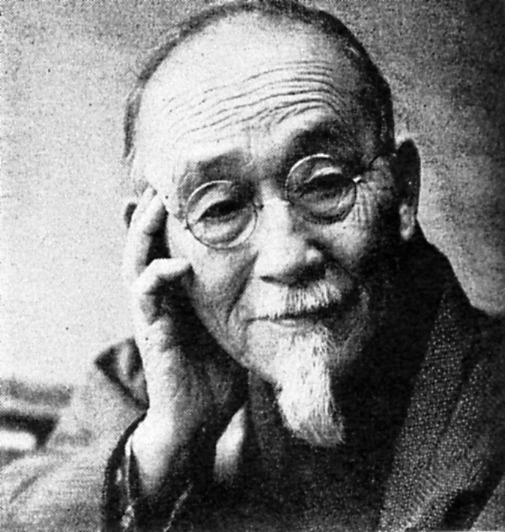
- Pictured in May 1954 edition of International Architecture (国際建築, Kokusai kenchiku)
- Born: 26 October 1867; Yonezawa, Yamagata
- Died: 7 April 1954 (aged 86); Bunkyō, Tokyo
- Education: Imperial University
- Occupation: Architect
- Awards: Order of the Sacred Treasure Order of Culture
- Practice: Japan Art Academy (final)
- Buildings: Tokyō University of Commerce; Tsukiji Hongan-ji; Kanematsu Auditorium at Hitobashi University

Itō Chūta (伊東 忠太; 26 October 1867 – 7 April 1954) was a Japanese architect, architectural historian, and critic. He is recognized as the leading architect and architectural theorist of early 20th-century Imperial Japan.

== Biography ==
Second son of a doctor in Yonezawa, present-day Yamagata Prefecture, Itō was educated in Tokyo. From 1889 to 1892 he studied under Tatsuno Kingo in the Department of Architecture at the Imperial University. Josiah Conder was still teaching in the department, while Ernest Fenollosa and Okakura Kakuzō were also influential in the formation of Itō's ideas. For graduation he designed a Gothic cathedral and wrote a dissertation on architectural theory. His doctoral thesis was on the architecture of Hōryū-ji. He was professor of architecture at the Imperial University from 1905, then of Waseda University from 1928.

Itō travelled widely, to the Forbidden City with photographer Ogawa Kazumasa in 1901 and subsequently, after fourteen months in China, to Burma, India, Sri Lanka, Turkey, Europe and the United States. Later he was involved in the planning of Chōsen Jingū in Seoul and a survey of the monuments of Rehe in Manchukuo. He incorporated elements of the diverse architectural styles he encountered in his many writings and approximately one hundred design projects. He was also a leading proponent of the Imperial Crown style of architecture, which had been developed for the Japanese Empire by architect Shimoda Kikutaro.

Itō helped formulate the Ancient Temples and Shrines Preservation Law of 1897, an early measure to protect the Cultural Properties of Japan. He is also credited with coining the Japanese term for architecture, namely kenchiku (建築) (lit. 'erection of buildings') in place of the former zōkagaku (造家学) (lit. 'study of making houses'). A member of the Japan Academy, in 1943 he was awarded the Order of Culture. Itō has more recently been criticised, with specific reference to his writings on Ise Grand Shrine, for having 'blurred a religio-political discourse with an architectural discourse'.

== Projects ==
Project	Date	Location	Comments	Image
Heian Jingū	1895	Sakyō-ku, Kyoto	recreation on a smaller scale of the Daikokuden (Great Hall of State) of the ancient capital of Heian-kyō; Itō worked with fellow architect Kiko Kiyoyoshi, drawing on his studies of old records and picture scrolls	
Asano Sōichirō pavilion (浅野総一郎邸)	1909	Tokyo	Japanese-style pavilion; destroyed in the Great Kantō earthquake	
Niraku Villa (二楽荘, Nirakusō)	1910	Kobe, Hyōgo Prefecture	for Ōtani Kōzui, one of the pioneering explorers of Central Asia and the Silk Road; destroyed by arson on 18 October 1932; to the north of Konan University; photographic documentation exists	
Asoka Shinryōjo	1912	Shimogyō-ku, Kyoto	for the Shinshū Believers Life Insurance Company; now the Hongan-ji Dendo'in; Municipal Cultural Property	34°59′28.9″N 135°45′14.3″E
Main Gate (正門, Seimon), Tokyo Imperial University	1912	Bunkyō, Tokyo	replacement for the Edo-period Akamon, moved to one side; Emperor Meiji was the first to ride through, on graduation day 1912; Itō was professor at the University from 1905; Registered Tangible Cultural Property	
Meiji Jingū	1920	Shibuya, Tokyo	shrine to Emperor Meiji; destroyed in the Tokyo air raids of World War II; rebuilt in 1958 following the original design	
Uesugi Jinja (上杉神社)	1923	Yonezawa, Yamagata Prefecture	rebuilding after a great fire in 1919 that destroyed over a thousand buildings; in the city of Itō's birth	
Great Hall (大殿, Daiden), Zōjō-ji	1925	Minato, Tokyo	an earlier hall was lost in a fire in 1873 and its replacement in a fire in 1909; Itō's hall was destroyed in 1945; the Great Hall was rebuilt in 1978	
Tekigai Villa (荻外荘, Tekigaisō)	1927	Suginami, Tokyo	for Prime Minister Fumimaro Konoe, founder of the Taisei Yokusankai movement	
Gion Kaku (祇園閣)	1927	Higashiyama-ku, Kyoto	34 m; in Gion; Registered Tangible Cultural Property	
Ōkura Shūkokan (大倉集古館)	1927	Minato, Tokyo	rebuilding after the Great Kantō earthquake; houses the Ōkura Museum of Art with a collection that includes three National Treasures; Registered Tangible Cultural Property	
Kanematsu Auditorium (兼松講堂, Kanematsu kōdō)	1927	Kunitachi, Tokyo	Romanesque Revival style; part of Hitotsubashi University; Registered Tangible Cultural Property	
Former Hankyū Umeda Station Concourse (旧阪急梅田駅地上駅コンコース)	1929	Kita-ku, Osaka	with dome, gilding, chandeliers, and arabesque	
Tokyo Memorial Hall (東京都慰霊堂, Tōkyōto ireidō)	1930	Sumida, Tokyo	Dedicated to 58,000 victims of the Great Kantō earthquake of 1 September 1923 and 105,000 victims of the bombing of Tokyo on the night of 9/10 March 1945	
Tokyo Reconstruction Memorial Hall (東京都復興記念館, Tōkyōto fukkō kinenkan)	1931	Sumida, Tokyo	houses exhibits relating to reconstruction after the Great Kantō earthquake; located in Yokoamichō Park near the Tokyo Memorial Hall	
Yūshūkan	1931	Chiyoda, Tokyo	rebuilding after the Great Kantō earthquake; museum of Yasukuni Jinja	
Shōgyōden (聖教殿), Hokekyō-ji	1931	Ichikawa, Chiba Prefecture	reinforced concrete structure to house temple treasures, including texts by Nichiren, founder of the Nichiren School (On Establishing the Correct teaching for the Peace of the Land and The Object of Devotion for Observing the Mind)	
Sōji-ji Daisodo	1933	Tsurumi-ku, Yokohama	Monks' training center	
Shinmon (神門), Yasukuni Jinja	1934	Chiyoda, Tokyo	reminiscent of the shinmei-zukuri style of the Ise Grand Shrine	
Tsukiji Hongan-ji	1934	Chūō, Tokyo	rebuilding after the Great Kantō earthquake; evokes chaitya no.9 at the Ajanta Caves; near the Tsukiji fish market; Registered Tangible Cultural Property	
Haiseiden (俳聖殿)	1942	Iga, Mie Prefecture	for the 300th anniversary celebrations of the birth of Matsuo Bashō; in the grounds of Iga Ueno Castle; Important Cultural Property	

== See also ==
- List of Japanese architects
- List of Important Cultural Properties of Japan (Shōwa period: structures)
- An Artist of the Floating World
