= Ōkura Kihachirō =

Japanese businessman and philanthropist (1837–1928)

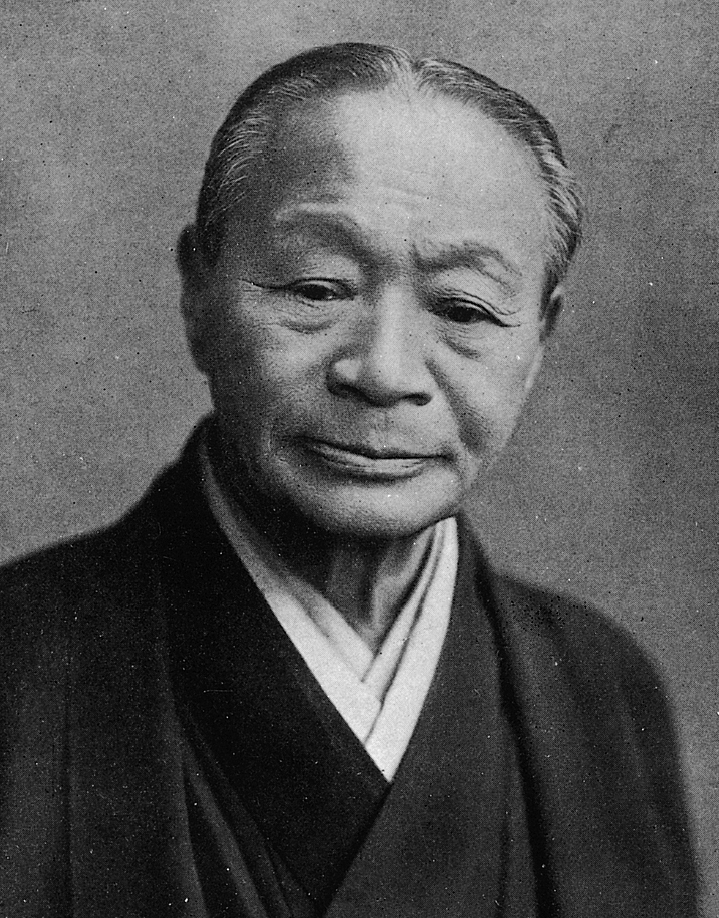
Ōkura Kihachirō

Baron Ōkura Kihachirō (大倉 喜八郎; 23 October 1837 – 5 April 1928) was a Japanese businessman, investor, and philanthropist. He was the corporate progenitor of the Ōkura-gumi zaibatsu, which later became the Taisei Corporation, and the Ōkura Shōgyō Gakkō ("Okura Commerce School") which later became Tokyo University of Economics in 1949. In contrast to most of the zaibatsu, the Ōkura zaibatsu was founded by someone from the peasant class.

== Biography ==
Ōkura was born in Echigo Province, and moved to Edo and worked for three years before starting his own grocery store in 1857. After selling groceries for eight years, he became a weapons dealer during the turbulent years between the arrival of the Black Ships and the eventual overthrow in 1867 of the Tokugawa Shogunate. Despite being born a peasant, he became an expert in Shindō Munen-ryū. He became one of the principal business investors of the original Imperial Hotel completed in 1890.

Kihachiro's son, Kishichirō, is credited with introducing the automobile into Japan.

Ōkura first went to Korea when he was around 40 years old. He visited soon after Korea was forcefully opened by Japan. In 1878, he established the First Bank of Japan in Busan. He then worked in trade and supplies for the Japanese military. When Korea came under Japanese colonial rule, the colonial government began auctioning off buildings in the Korean royal palace Gyeongbokgung. Ōkura purchased the building Jaseondang and had it reassembled in his private home in Tokyo.

Kihachiro, who made a fortune in his lifetime and lived in Toranomon, was a collector of Oriental antiques. In fear of valuable artworks flowing out to other countries, he built Japan's first private museum, the Okura Museum of Art (Ōkura Shukokan), in 1917 by donating many cultural assets he had collected, the land, and the funds. The 5-story building stood on a property of about 10,000 square meters (2.5 acres), but it was damaged in the 1923 Great Kantō earthquake. The museum that now stands adjacent to the Hotel Ōkura was rebuilt in 1928; it was based on a design by Itō Chūta, who is known for his design of Tsukiji Hongan-ji, and is designated as a cultural asset of Japan. The museum houses 2,000 pieces of Oriental paintings and sculptures, including such national treasures as the wooden statue of Samantabhadra and 35,000 volumes of Chinese literature.

== Honors ==
=== Japanese ===
- Medal of Honor with Yellow Ribbon (6 November 1888)
- Medal of Merit of the Japanese Red Cross (November 1898)
- Baron (1 December 1915)
- Grand Cordon of the Order of the Sacred Treasure (11 February 1924; Second Class: 26 September 1907)
- Grand Cordon of the Order of the Rising Sun (20 January 1928; Third Class: 3 November 1902; Fourth Class: 28 October 1897)

=== Others ===
- Second Class, Second Grade of the Imperial Order of the Double Dragon of China (10 February 1912)
- Grand Cordon of the Precious Golden Harvest of the Republic of China (November 1917; Second Class: 26 January 1915)
- Grand Cordon of the Order of the Eight Trigrams of the Empire of Korea (December 1908)
- Grand Cross of the Order of Leopold II of Belgium (29 October 1926)

== See also ==
- Ōkura Kishichirō
- Suematsu Kenchō
- Kikuchi Dairoku
- Inagaki Manjirō
- Anglo-Japanese relations
