= Sherwood F. Moran =

- “CAPTAIN Sherwood F. Moran ----Marine Corps interpreter on Guadalcanal, holds school in Japanese for Leatherneck students who will eventually put this training to good use.” - From the Thayer Soule Collection (COLL/2266) at the Archives Branch, Marine Corps History Division
- Born: October 8, 1885; Covington, Kentucky
- Died: February 7, 1983; Sawtelle, Los Angeles, California
- Spouse: Ursul Mildred Reeves (1890-1967)
- Children: Sherwood Reeves “Sherry” Moran (1917-2008)
- Military career
- Branch: Marines
- Rank: Lieutenant Colonel
- Conflicts: Battle of Guadalcanal
- Other work: Artibus Asiae

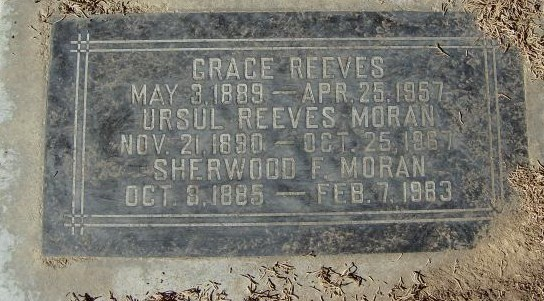
The gravestone of Sherwood F. Moran, his wife Ursul Reeves Moran, and her sister Grace Reeves.

Sherwood Ford Moran (8 October 1885 – 7 February 1983) was a United States Marine major who after

serving as a Congregational missionary in Japan fought in the Second World War as an interrogator of PoWs and soon after became known for his memorandum on the efficacy of humane forms of interrogation.

== Biography ==
In 1885, Sherwood F. Moran was born in Covington, Kentucky, to William Joel Moran and Margaret Ford. His father was a military clerk of Northern (non-Catholic) Irish descent. In 1914, Moran graduated from Oberlin College with a bachelor's in philosophy. In 1915, he married Ursul Mildred Reeves. In 1916, he graduated from Union Theological Seminary, after two years of study, with a Congregational ordination. In the same year, he also attained a master's in philosophy from Columbia University.

Between 1916 and 1956 (with wartime interruption), the Morans were missionaries with the American Board of Commissioners for Foreign Missions in Japan. Their time was spent mostly in Osaka, where in 1925 they established the Christian Church there and the Yodagawa Neighborhood House.

During the Second World War, after the Attack on Pearl Harbor, Moran volunteered as a commissioned officer in the U.S. Marine Corps. After traveling to the Marine headquarters in Washington D.C. and enlisting there, he was made a captain immediately, despite his age, as he was among the most fluent speakers of Japanese in the United States. He performed his duties 1942–1946, eventually reaching the rank of lieutenant colonel. In 1946, following postbombing assessment, he left the Marine Corps. In 1948, he and Ursul returned to Japan to continue their work, from which they retired in 1956. Sherwood Moran was awarded by the Emperor of Japan the official decoration known as the Order of the Sacred Treasure, Fifth Class.

In his later years, Moran published many articles on Japanese sculpture and other artifacts in Artibus Asiae and Oriental Art and similar journals, and also authored volumes on Japanese swordguards and accessories. He died on 7 February 1983 at the age of 97. He is buried at Hillside Memorial Park Cemetery in Redlands, California.

A detailed family-authored biography of Moran draws on recorded interviews he gave in his last decade, https://davidrmoran.wordpress.com/.

== Suggestions for Japanese interpreters based on work in the field ==
Moran wrote a memo in 1943 regarding the best ways to interrogate Japanese prisoners-of-war during the Second World War. The memo was "relatively unknown outside the Marine Corps until the summer of 2003, when it (was) included in the archives of the Marine Corps Interrogator Translator Teams Association." The work argued for treating prisoners with humanity and respect, as that would be more effective than forms of interrogation involving torture.

In his work, Moran prefers the term "interviewers" to "interrogators", and suggests that the interviewer must be constantly aware of his attitude to the prisoner. He further writes that a superior or demeaning attitude breeds nothing but antagonism and resistance. He encourages the interviewer to be able to speak the language of his captives, without translators. While on the outside Moran's techniques seem to be chitchat, the interviewer must be constantly aware of the goals: "Deep human sympathy can go with a business-like, systematic, and ruthlessly persistent approach.” Ultimately, Moran "practiced the bedrock principles of modern effective interrogation techniques, based mostly on knowing the language and customs of the enemy."

The Marine Corps Interrogator Translator Teams Association (MCITTA), a group of active-duty and retired Marine intelligence personnel, calls Moran's report one of the "timeless documents" in the field and says it has long been "a standard read" for insiders. MajGen Michael E. Ennis, former director of Marine Corps Intelligence, says Moran's reports are the "gold standard" of interrogation techniques, owing to their actionable results in theater. They remain studied and in use today. The findings after the Abu Ghraib scandals indicated that, as predicted by Moran's findings, those who extracted the most useful information were those who were nice to their subjects.
