= Jindai-ji (Tokyo) =

Temple of Tendai Buddhism in Tokyo, Japan

Coordinates: 35.667525°N 139.550472°E

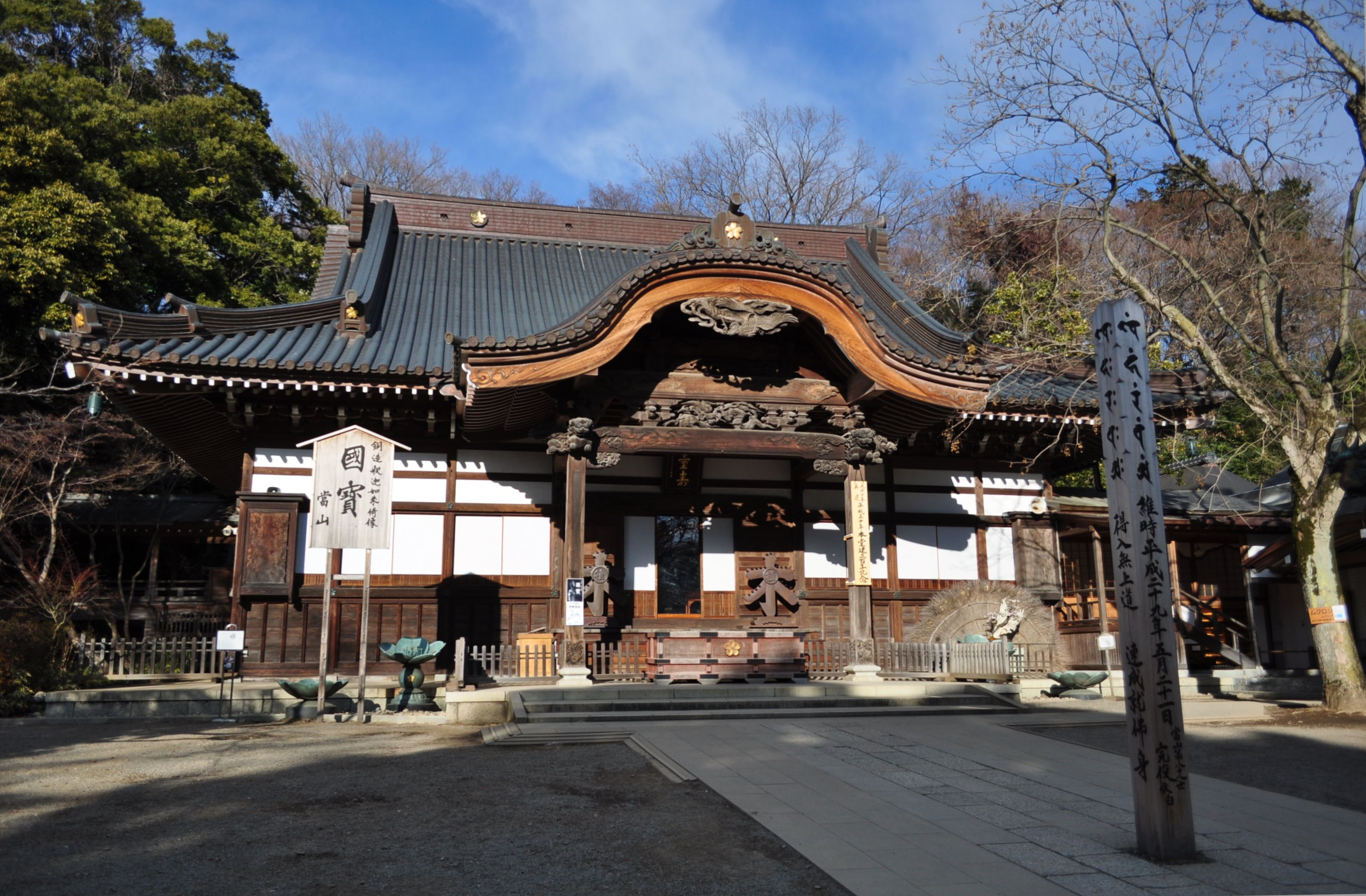
Main Hall

Jindai-ji (深大寺)is a temple belonging to the Tendai school of Buddhism. It is located in Chōfu in Tokyo Prefecture.

== History ==
The foundation of Jindai-ji goes back many centuries. In the context of esoteric Buddhism (Japanese: 密教, romanized: Mikkyō), the name of the temple refers to the saint of water, Jinja Daiō (深沙大王). According to the temple tradition, the daughter of Sato Osaukon (郷長右近) fell in love with a man named Fukuman (福満) in the area. Her mother was against the marriage, so Fukuman prayed to Jinja Daiō, and the mother finally acceded to the marriage. In gratitude, the daughter is said to have founded the temple in Tempyō 5 (733) in order to pay gratitude and worship Jinja Daiō there. In the Jōgan era (859–877) the temple is said to have followed the Tendai school of Buddhism. The principal figure of veneration in the temple is the Amida Buddha.

== Temple grounds ==
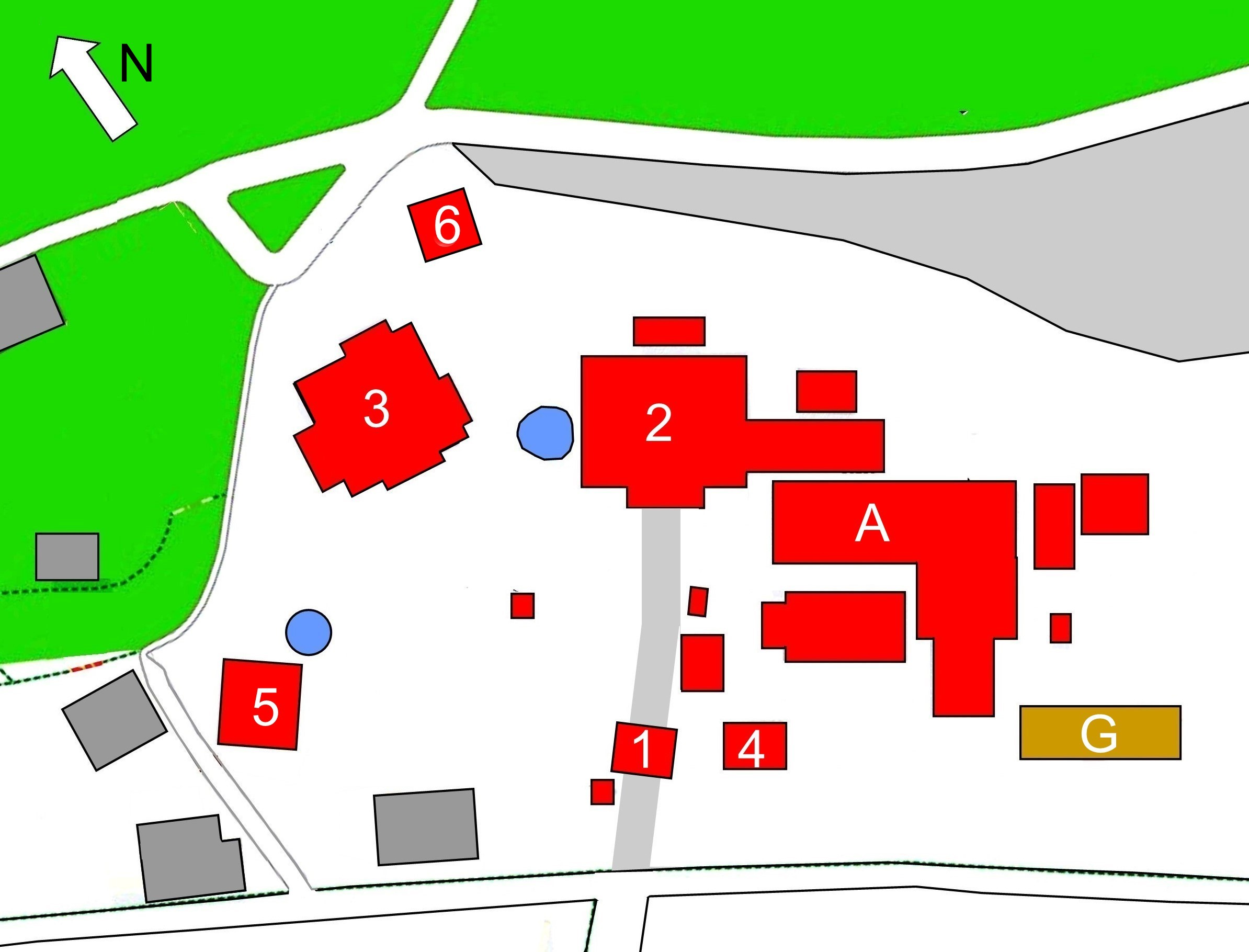
Central temple area (s. Text)

The temple is bordered in a semicircular shape by a hill to the northeast. A staircase leads to the temple and it is entered through the temple gate (Japanese: 山門, romanized: Sammon; map: 1). The original gate was lost in a fire in 1695 and was rebuilt in the Yakui style. After passing the gate, the temple bell (Japanese: 鐘楼, romanized: Shōrō, map: 4) can be seen on the right, and ahead the main hall (Japanese: 本堂, romanized: Hondō; map: 2). The main hall was lost in a major fire in the middle of the 19th century, and was eventually rebuilt in the first half of the 20th century. In 2003 the roof was rebuilt, using copper plates in the shape of bricks, instead of actual bricks.

To the left of the main hall, and set back, is the 'Gansandaishidō' (元三大師堂; map: 3), which was popular in the Edo period, for praying for good fortune in life. In 1900, a group of sculptures of a seated Shaka Buddha with two companions made of bronze with gold traces (Japanese: 金銅釈迦如来椅像, romanized: Kongō Shaka Nyorai Izō) was discovered underneath the hall, for which a separate building, the Shakadō (釈迦堂; map: 5) was built. The sculptures, the 'Three Hakuhō-Buddhas' (Japanese: 白鳳三仏, romanized: Hakuhō are named for the Hakuhō period (673–686) from which they are dated. The sculptures have been designated as a National Treasure.

To the right of the main hall is the monks' quarters with the residence hall (map: A) and the guest house, known as "Accommodation for Sparrows" (Japanese: 雀のお宿, romanized: Suzume no oyado; map: G). In the rear, where the temple rises, stands the small 'Kaisandō' (開山堂; map: 6), which is dedicated to the founder of the temple. The temple cemetery is further above and to the west.

== Photo Gallery ==
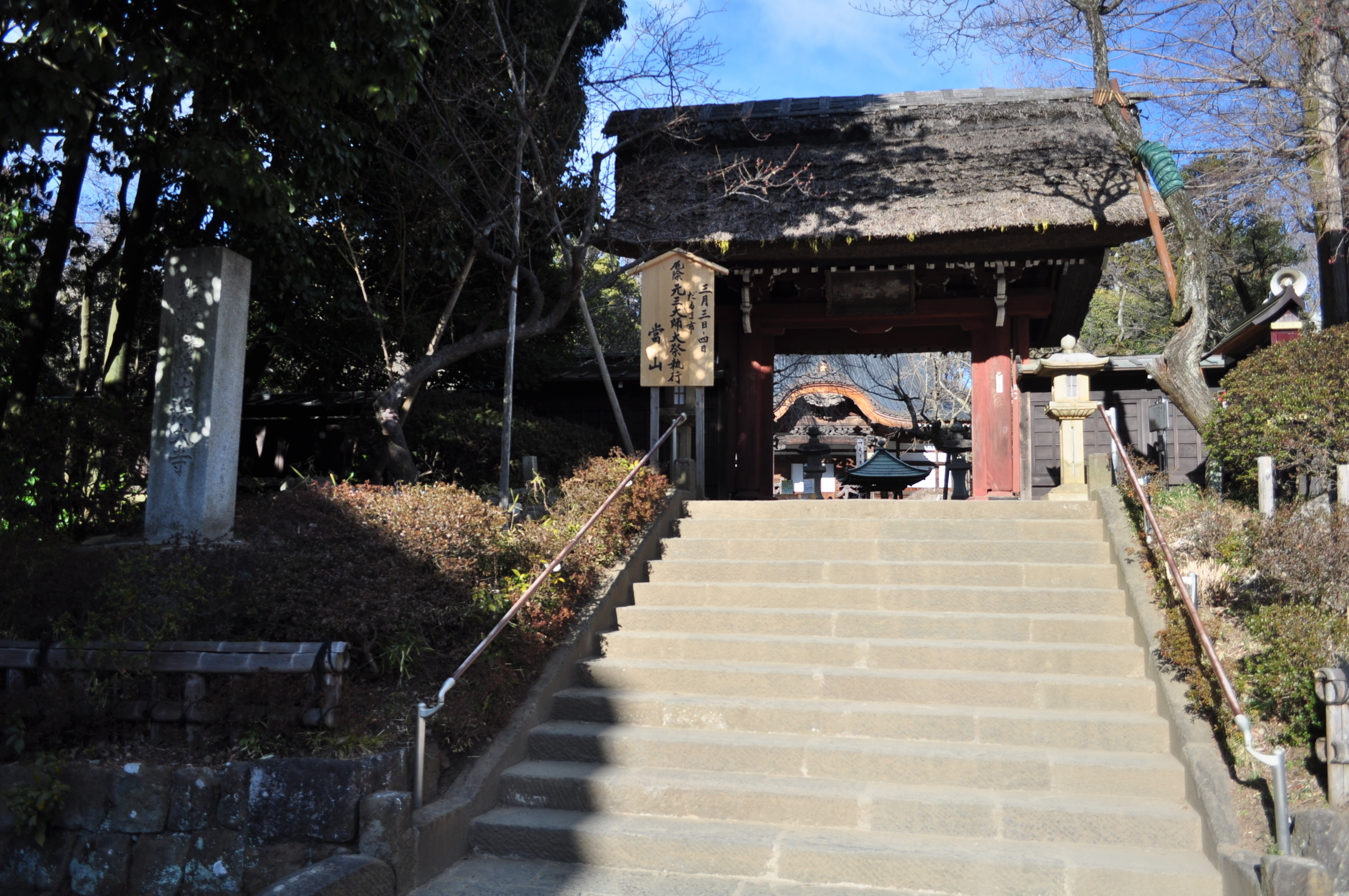
Temple Gate

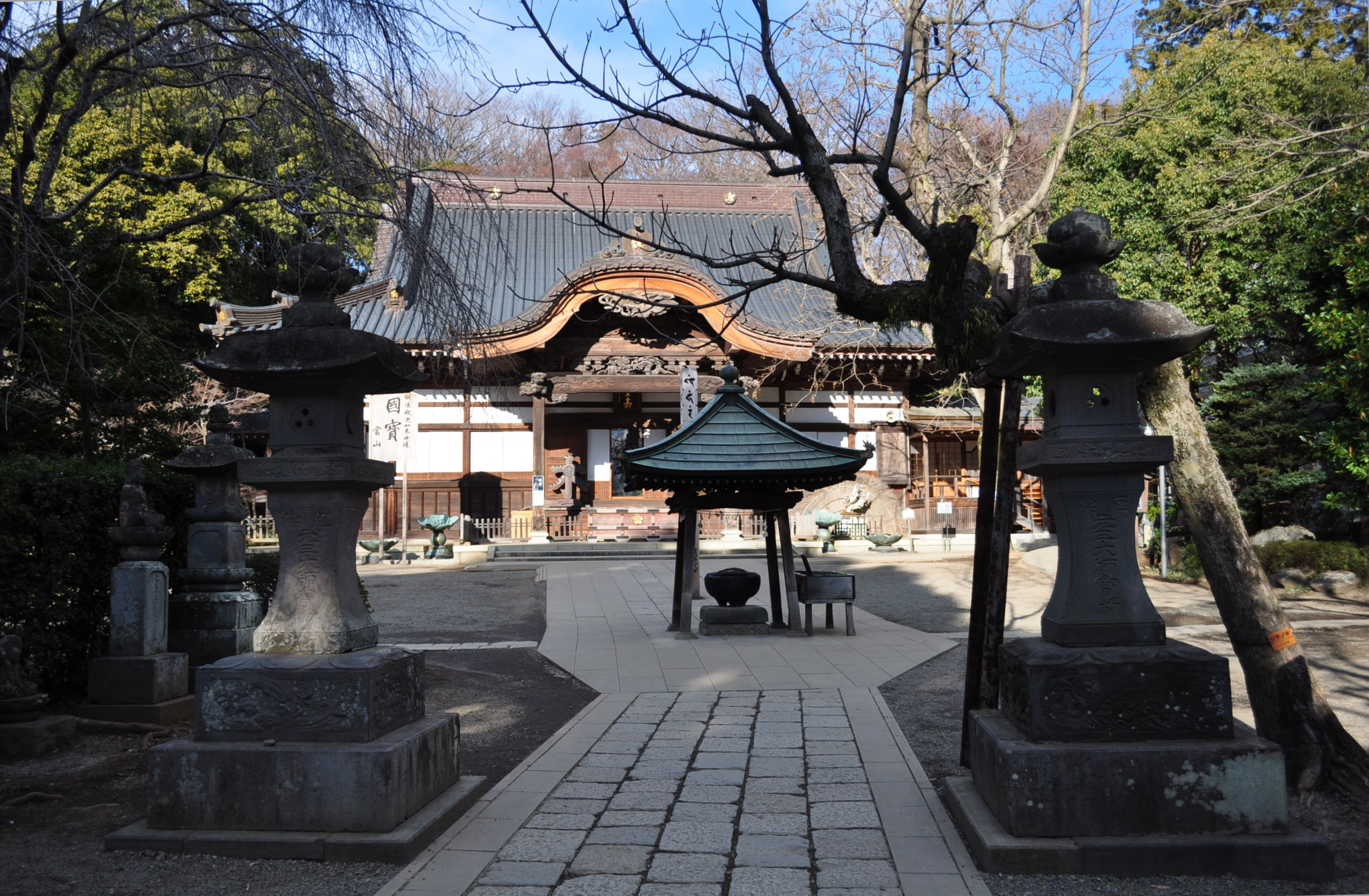
Main Hall

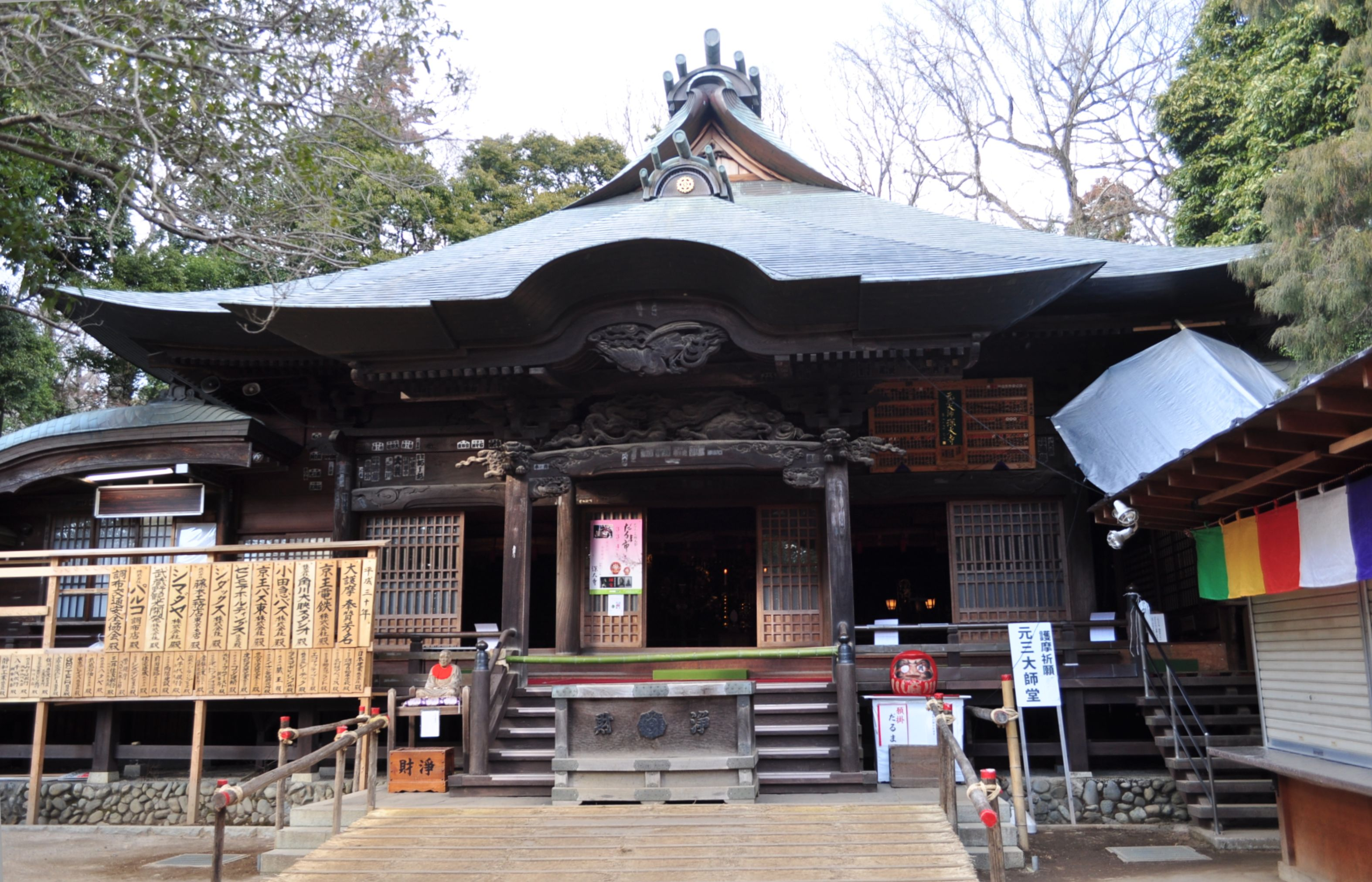
Gansandaishidō

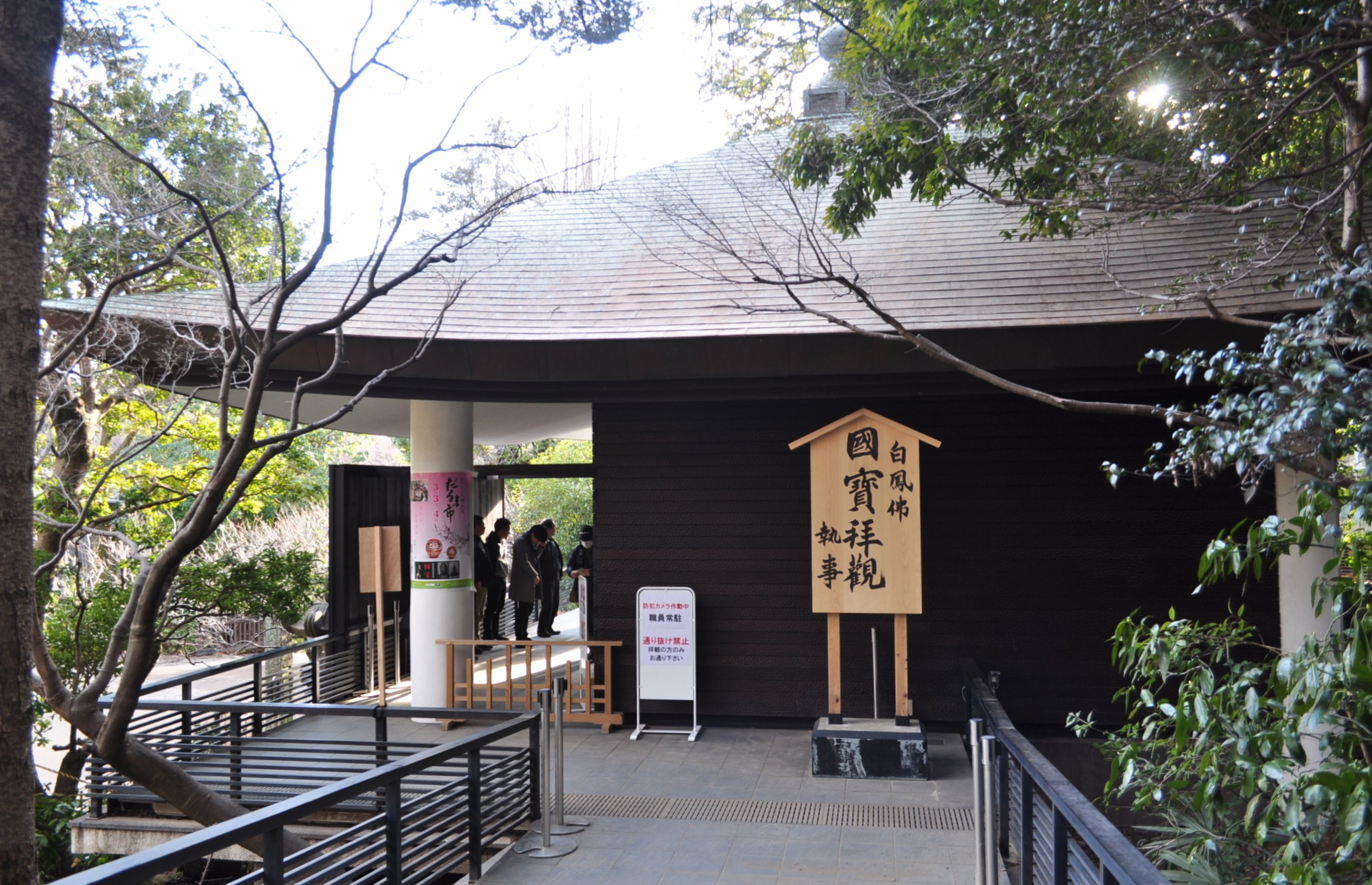
Shakadō

== Related literature ==
- Tokyo-to rekishi kyoiku kenkyukai (Hrsg.): Jindaiji. In: Tokyo-to no rekishi sampo (ge). Yamakawa Shuppan, 2005, ISBN 978-4-634-24813-7.
- Saitō Gesshin u. a.: Edo meisho zue (江戸名所図会). Six volumes, 1834 to 1836.
