= List of important cultural properties of Japan (Shōwa period: structures) =

This list is of Japanese structures dating from the Shōwa period (1926–1989) that have been designated important cultural properties. As of October 2016, fifty-three properties with one hundred and eight component structures have been so designated.

== Structures ==
Structure	Date	Municipality	Prefecture	Comments	Image	Coordinates	Ref.
Kon Family Residence 金家住宅; Kon-ke jūtaku	1925-28	Kita-Akita	Akita	designation comprises four components: western-style residence (1925), Japanese-style residence (1928), rice storehouse (1913), warehouse (1902); one of the few hybrid residences in Tōhoku		40°07′45″N 140°20′55″E	
Marunuma Dam 丸沼堰堤; Marunuma entei	1931	Katashina	Gunma	88.2 m wide, 32.1 m high; for hydroelectric power		36°49′26″N 139°20′23″E	
Former Maeda Family Main Residence 旧前田家本邸 kyū-Maeda-ke hontei	1929-30	Meguro	Tokyo	designation comprises eight components: western-style residence, main gate, and gatehouse (1929), and Japanese-style residence, two associated corridors, waiting area for a chashitsu, and gate (1930)		35°39′44″N 139°40′49″E	
Former Residence of Prince Asaka 旧朝香宮邸 kyū-Asaka-no-miya tei	1933-36	Minato	Tokyo	designation comprises five components: main building, warehouse, garage, and front gate (1933), and tea house (1936); now the Tokyo Metropolitan Teien Art Museum		35°38′13″N 139°43′09″E	
Former Tokyo Science Museum: main building 旧東京科学博物館本館 kyū-Tōkyō Kagaku Hakubutsukan honkan	1931	Taitō	Tokyo	part of the rebuilding after the Great Kantō earthquake; now the National Museum of Nature and Science		35°42′59″N 139°46′35″E	
Former Tokyo Imperial Museum: main building 旧東京科学博物館本館 kyū-Tōkyō Teishitsu Hakubutsukan honkan	1937	Taitō	Tokyo	constructed after the Great Kantō earthquake at a cost of six million yen after the design by Watanabe Hitoshi; now the Tokyo National Museum		35°43′07″N 139°46′35″E	
Former Baba Family Ushigome Residence 旧馬場家牛込邸 kyū-Baba-ke Ushigome tei	1928	Shinjuku	Tokyo			35°41′56″N 139°44′19″E	
National Museum of Western Art: main building 国立西洋美術館本館; Kokuritsu Seiyō Bijutsukan honkan	1959	Taitō	Tokyo	by Le Corbusier; component of the serial UNESCO World Heritage List inscription The Architectural Work of Le Corbusier: an Outstanding Contribution to the Modern Movement; not a National Treasure		35°42′56″N 139°46′33″E	
Mitsui main building 三井本館; Mitsui honkan	1929	Chūō	Tokyo	built to replace the 1889 headquarters, heavily damaged in the Great Kantō earthquake; now houses the Mitsui Memorial Museum		35°41′11″N 139°46′23″E	
Jiyū Gakuen House of Tomorrow 自由学園明日館; Jiyū Gakuen myōnichikan	1927	Toshima	Tokyo	by Frank Lloyd Wright; formerly the Jiyu Gakuen Girls' School; designation comprises four components: central building (1921), east classroom building (1925), west classroom building (1922), and lecture hall (1927)		35°43′36″N 139°42′26″E	
Kachidoki Bridge 勝鬨橋; Kachidoki bashi	1940	Chūō	Tokyo	movable bridge		35°39′44″N 139°46′30″E	
Kiyosu Bridge 勝鬨橋; Kiyosu bashi	1928	Chūō	Tokyo	suspension bridge reconstructed after the Great Kantō earthquake		35°40′57″N 139°47′31″E	
Waseda University Okuma Memorial Hall 早稲田大学大隈記念講堂; Waseda daigaku Ōkuma kinen kōdō	1927	Shinjuku	Tokyo	named after the founder, Ōkuma Shigenobu		35°42′32″N 139°43′18″E	
Sonkeikaku Bunko 尊経閣文庫; Sonkeikaku Bunko	1928	Meguro	Tokyo	designation comprises four components: library, archive, storage space, and gate		35°39′46″N 139°40′46″E	
Tsukiji Hongan-ji Main Hall 築地本願寺本堂; Tsukji Hongaji hondō	1934	Chūō	Tokyo	by Itō Chūta		35°39′59″N 139°46′20″E	
Meiji Life Insurance Mutual headquarters: main building 明治生命保険相互会社本社本館; Meiji seimei hokensō gogaisha honsha honkan	1934	Chiyoda	Tokyo	now the headquarters of Meiji Yasuda Life Insurance Company		35°40′44″N 139°45′42″E	
Takashimaya Tokyo store 明治生命保険相互会社本社本館; Takashimaya Tōkyō-ten	1933	Chūō	Tokyo	occupies an entire city block		35°40′51″N 139°46′25″E	
Japan National Route 1 Hakone Yumoto road facilities 国道一号箱根湯本道路施設; Kokudō ichigō Hakone Yumoto dōro shisetsu	1930-31	Hakone	Kangawa	designation comprises three components: the Chitose Bridge (1930), Kanrei Dōmon tunnel (1931), and Asahi Bridge (1933)		35°13′57″N 139°05′47″E	
Former Sado Mining Sites 旧佐渡鉱山採鉱施設 kyū-Sado kōzan saikō shisetsu	1937-1940	Sado	Niigata	designation comprises eight components: great shaft tower (1940), associated chamber (1940), tunnels (1940), ore crushing facility (1937), conveyor belts (1938), machinery workshop (1940), and two Meiji-period bridges; The Sado complex of heritage mines, primarily gold mines have been submitted for inscription on the UNESCO World Heritage List		38°02′36″N 138°15′36″E	
Bandai Bridge 萬代橋; Bandai bashi	1929	Niigata	Niigata	306.9 m long, 22 m wide		37°55′11″N 139°03′11″E	
Shiraiwa Check Dam Facility 白岩堰堤砂防施設; Shiraiwa entei sabō shisetsu	1939	Toyama	Toyama	check dam to reduce erosion and flooding; designation comprises four components: main dam (1939), sub-dam (1919), boards (1939), and shoring works (1939)		36°32′55″N 137°32′04″E	
Fugan Canal Lock Facility (Nakajima Lock Gate) 富岩運河水閘施設 (中島閘門); Fugan unga suikō shisetsu (Nakajima kōmon)	1934	Toyama	Toyama	designation comprises five components: lock, spillway, Nakajima Bridge (two components), and control room		36°43′32″N 137°32′04″E	
Katakurakan 片倉館; Katakurakan	1928	Suwa	Nagano	western-style spa complex; designation comprises three components: bath house, meeting hall, and connecting corridor		36°02′54″N 138°06′47″E	
Atami Hyūga Family Villa Annex 旧日向家熱海別邸地下室 kyū-Hyūga-ke Atami bettei chikashitsu	1936	Atami	Shizuoka	by Bruno Taut		35°06′12″N 139°04′54″E	
Aichi Prefectural Government Office 愛知県庁舎; Aichi-kenchōsha	1938	Nagoya	Aichi			35°10′49″N 136°54′24″E	
Nagoya City Hall 名古屋市庁舎; Nagoya-shichōsha	1933	Nagoya	Aichi			35°10′53″N 136°54′23″E	
Nagoya Higashiyama Botanical Garden greenhouse 名古屋市東山植物園温室前館; Nagoya-shi Higashiyama shokubutsuen	1936	Nagoya	Aichi	one of the first iron and glass buildings in the country		35°09′15″N 136°58′56″E	
Hinjitsukan 旧賓日館 kyū-Hinjitsukan	1935	Ise	Mie	guesthouse for visitors to Ise Jingu; designation comprises three components: main building (1887), storeroom (1887), and hall (1935)		34°30′29″N 136°47′04″E	
Haiseiden 俳聖殿; Haiseiden	1942	Iga	Mie	by Itō Chūta for the 300th anniversary celebrations of Matsuo Bashō; in the grounds of Iga Ueno Castle		34°46′19″N 136°07′43″E	
Suehiro Bridge 末広橋梁; Suehiro kyōryō	1930	Yokkaichi	Mie	bascule bridge; former Yokkaichi Port Station railway bridge		34°57′16″N 136°38′00″E	
Kamigamo Jinja 賀茂別雷神社; Kamigamo Jinja Kataoka hashi	1926	Kyoto	Kyoto	designation comprises thirty-four components, mainly dating to the early Edo period, also including the Kataoka Bridge (片岡橋) of 1926		35°03′38″N 135°45′10″E	
Nomura Hekiunsō 野村碧雲荘; Nomura Hekiunsō	1928	Kyoto	Kyoto	villa built for Tokushichi Nomura II in the grounds of Nanzen-ji; the gardens use water from Lake Biwa Canal; designation comprises seventeen components, including a Noh stage and chashitsu; six date from the Taishō era and the remainder from 1928		35°00′49″N 135°47′35″E	
Ōe Bridge and Yodoya Bridge 大江橋及び淀屋橋; Ōe bashi oyobi Yodoya bashi	1935	Osaka	Osaka	over the Kyū-Yodo River via Nakanoshima; Yodoya Bridge pictured		34°41′41″N 135°30′04″E	
Mengyō Kaikan 綿業会館; Mengyō kaikan	1931	Osaka	Osaka	for leaders of the textile industry		34°41′08″N 135°30′14″E	
Kobe College 神戸女学院; Kōbe jo-gakuin	1933	Kobe	Hyōgo	designation comprises twelve components		34°45′39″N 135°21′07″E	
Anglican Church in Japan - Nara Episcopal Church 日本聖公会奈良基督教会; Nihon seikōkai Nara Kirisuto kyōkai	1937	Nara	Nara	designation comprises two components: the church (1930) and school building (192)		34°40′58″N 135°49′46″E	
Former Kōya-guchi School Building 旧高野口尋常高等小学校校舎 kyū-Kōya-guchi jinjō kōtō shō gakkō kōsha kaikan	1937	Hashimoto	Wakayama			34°18′14″N 135°33′11″E	
Mitani Waterworks Facility Site 旧美歎水源地水道施設 kyū-Mitani suigenchi suidō shisetsu	1926-28	Tottori	Tottori	designation comprises ten components, eight dating to the Taishō period, the fifth filtration pond to 1928 and the meter room to 1926-8		35°29′11″N 134°17′15″E	
Ishitani Family Residence 石谷家住宅; Ishitani-ke jūtaku	1926-28	Chizu	Tottori	designation with eight components, two dating to the Meiji period, three to the Taishō period, the main building to 1928, parlour to 1926–8, and family room to 1928		35°16′12″N 134°13′49″E	
Hiroshima Peace Memorial Museum 広島平和記念資料館; Hiroshima heiwa kinen shiryōkan	1955	Hiroshima	Hiroshima	by Kenzo Tange; in Hiroshima Peace Memorial Park		34°23′31″N 132°27′08″E	
Hiroshima World Peace Memorial Cathedral 世界平和記念聖堂; Sekai heiwa kinen seidō	1954	Hiroshima	Hiroshima	by Tōgo Murano		34°23′44″N 132°28′04″E	
Watanabe Memorial Hall 渡辺翁記念会館; Sekai heiwa kinen seidō	1937	Ube	Yamaguchi	by Tōgo Murano; for industrialist Watanabe Sukesaku (渡辺祐策)		33°57′29″N 131°14′41″E	
Arichi Family Residence 有近家住宅; Arichi-ke jūtaku	1926-45	Yamaguchi	Yamaguchi	designation comprises seven components, one dating to the Meiji period, three to the Taishō period, and a Nagaya (1929), pickles hut (1926–45), and bottle washery (1936)		34°13′53″N 131°39′48″E	
Mikawa Family Residence 三河家住宅; Mikawa-ke jūtaku	1928	Tokushima	Tokushima	illustrates the proliferation of modern materials and styles		34°03′59″N 134°33′22″E	
Hōnen'ike Dam 豊稔池堰堤; Hōnen-ike entei	1929	Kan'onji	Kagawa	145.5 m wide, 30.4 m high		34°02′30″N 133°41′05″E	
Nagahama Ōhashi Bridge 長浜大橋; Nagahama-ōhashi	1935	Ōzu	Ehime			33°36′36″N 132°28′47″E	
Hizuchi Primary School 日土小学校; Hizuchi shōgakkō	1956-58	Yawatahama	Ehime	designation comprises two components, central block (1956) and east wing (1958)		33°30′02″N 132°25′40″E	
Yanase Forest Railway Facilities 旧魚梁瀬森林鉄道施設 kyū-Yanase shinrin tetsudō shisetsu	to 1941		Kōchi	designation includes fourteen component tunnels and bridges, four from the Meiji period, five from the Taishō period and five from the Shōwa period		33°29′15″N 134°00′09″E	
Shime Shaft Mine Intake 旧志免鉱業所竪坑櫓 kyū-Shime kōgyōsho tatekō yagura	1943	Shime	Fukuoka	for shaft mining in the Kasuya coal fields (糟屋炭田); 47.6 m		33°35′26″N 130°29′09″E	
Chikugo River Lift Bridge 旧筑後川橋梁 (筑後川昇開橋) kyū-Chikugogawa kyōryō (Chikugogawa shōkaikyō)	1935	Ōkawa	Fukuoka	Vertical-lift bridge; 507.2 m		33°12′54″N 130°21′42″E	
Nabeshima Family Residence 旧鍋島家住宅 kyū-Nabeshima-ke jūtaku	1930	Unzen	Nagasaki	designation comprises five components, dating from the Edo, Meiji and Shōwa periods (the main building)		32°52′12″N 130°16′04″E	
Hakusui Dam Facilities 白水溜池堰堤水利施設; Hakusui tame-ike entei suiri shisetsu	1938	Taketa	Ōita	designation comprises two components, the main dam and sub-dam		32°54′19″N 131°19′38″E	
Tsukayama Awamori Production Facilities 津嘉山酒造所施設; Tsukayama shuzōsho shisetsu	1935	Nago	Okinawa	designation comprises two components: main building, which includes residential quarters; and the koji house		26°35′29″N 127°59′00″E	

== See also ==
- Cultural Properties of Japan
- The Modern Industrial Heritage Sites in Kyushu and Yamaguchi
- List of Important Cultural Properties of Japan (Taishō period: structures)
