= Kishichiro Okura =

Japanese businessman (1882–1963)

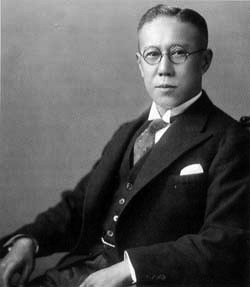
Kishichiro Okura

Baron Kishichiro Okura (大倉 喜七郎, Ōkura Kishichirō; June 16, 1882 – February 2, 1963) was a Japanese entrepreneur and hotelier.

== Biography ==
Baron Kishichiro Okura was the son of Okura Kihachiro (1837–1928), an entrepreneur who built up the Okura-gumi and founded the giant Okura Zaibatsu (family owned conglomerate) and the Okura Shogyo Gakko, which later became Tokyo Keizai University (Tokyo University of Economics), in 1949.

Okura studied at Trinity College, Cambridge from 1903 to 1906 but did not graduate. He competed in the first ever car race held at Brooklands in Surrey on July 6, 1907, where he came in second. Okura was also one of the pioneers who introduced the motor car to Japan. He was President of the Imperial Hotel and Okura luxury hotel chain that is still important in Japan today.

Okura Kishichiro was a primary patron in the establishment of the Nihon Ki-in or Japanese Go Association in 1924, where he organized and supported professional go players in Japan following the Meiji Restoration and subsequent ceasing of government support for the four go houses.

He also invented the Okraulo, a type of vertical flute.

== See also ==
- Kikuchi Dairoku
- Suematsu Kenchō
- Inagaki Manjirō
- Anglo-Japanese relations
- Japanese students in Britain
