= Machida Hisanari =

Japanese samurai and statesman

- 町田久成
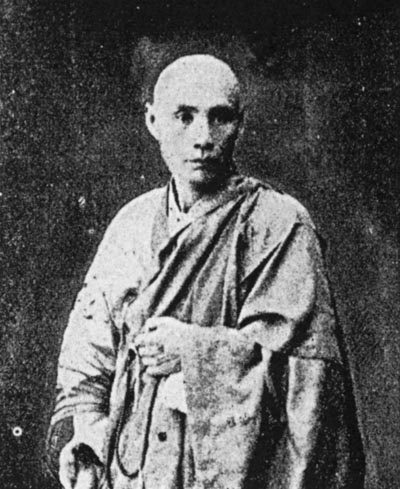
- Born: January 27, 1838; Kagoshima, Japan
- Died: September 15, 1897 (aged 59); Tokyo, Japan
- Other names: Ueno Ryōtarō

Machida Hisanari (町田久成) (January 27, 1838 – September 15, 1897), also known as Ueno Ryōtarō, was a Japanese samurai and statesman of the Meiji period (1868–1912). He was the first director of the Tokyo National Museum.

== Biography ==
=== Youth ===
Machida Hisanari was born in 1838 in Shinshōin, an ancient village of the old Satsuma Province which became a district of Kagoshima in 1883. He was the eldest son of Machida Hisanaga, head of a samurai family in the service of Shimazu Narioki, the daimyō of the Satsuma Domain. At the age of 19, he left his hometown and moved to Edo, the capital, in order to continue his studies. Before his return to Satsuma, he spent more than three years at the Shōhei-zaka Gakumonjo (昌平坂学問所), a state-run academy under the control of the shogunate where Bakufu officials were trained.

=== Travel to Europe ===
In 1863, he was promoted to Ōmetsuke and participated as a military officer in the Anglo-Satsuma War where he had the future admiral Tōgō Heihachirō under his command. In the following year, he led a troop of 600 men to defend the Imperial Palace against a group of insurgents.

In 1865, as a member of an official Japanese delegation, he spent a two-year study period in Europe enrolling as a student at University College London. As well as frequent visits to the British Museum his travels also took him to Paris where he visited both the Louvre and National Museum of Natural History. He also participated in the International Exposition of 1867. During his European journey, he became familiar with the concept of cultural heritage and the impact of museums and educational programs on the public.

=== Return to Japan ===
Back in Japan at the beginning of the Boshin War (January 1868 – June 1869), he was called to Kyoto with the mission of thwarting the plans of the Satchō Alliance, a military coalition dedicated to overthrowing the Tokugawa shogunate.

In 1870 he entered the service of the Meiji government, and became Secretary of State in the newly formed Ministry of Education. In this influential position, he strove to stop the devastation of the national historic heritage caused by the Meiji policy of separating Shinto and Buddhism and the violent anti-Buddhist movement (Haibutsu kishaku) it triggered.

In 1874, he accepted the position of director of office of the first official World's Fair in the United States, the Centennial Exposition in Philadelphia.

In 1882 he became the first director of the Imperial Museum in Tokyo (now called the Tokyo National Museum), but retired from this position later that year.

=== Retirement and death ===
In 1885 he joined the Chamber of Elders. In 1889 he left the state apparatus and retired to the Buddhist monastery Mii-dera in Shiga Prefecture. Machida died 15 September 1897 in Tokyo. His tomb is located within the grounds of Kan'ei-ji, a Buddhist temple in the Ueno district of Tokyo, which was the Bodaiji of the Tokugawa dynasty during the Edo period (1603–1868).

== See also ==
- Tokyo National Museum
- Japanese students in the United Kingdom
