= Ishitani Residence =

Building in Chizu, Tottori Prefecture, Japan

- 石谷家住宅; Ishitanike Jūtaku
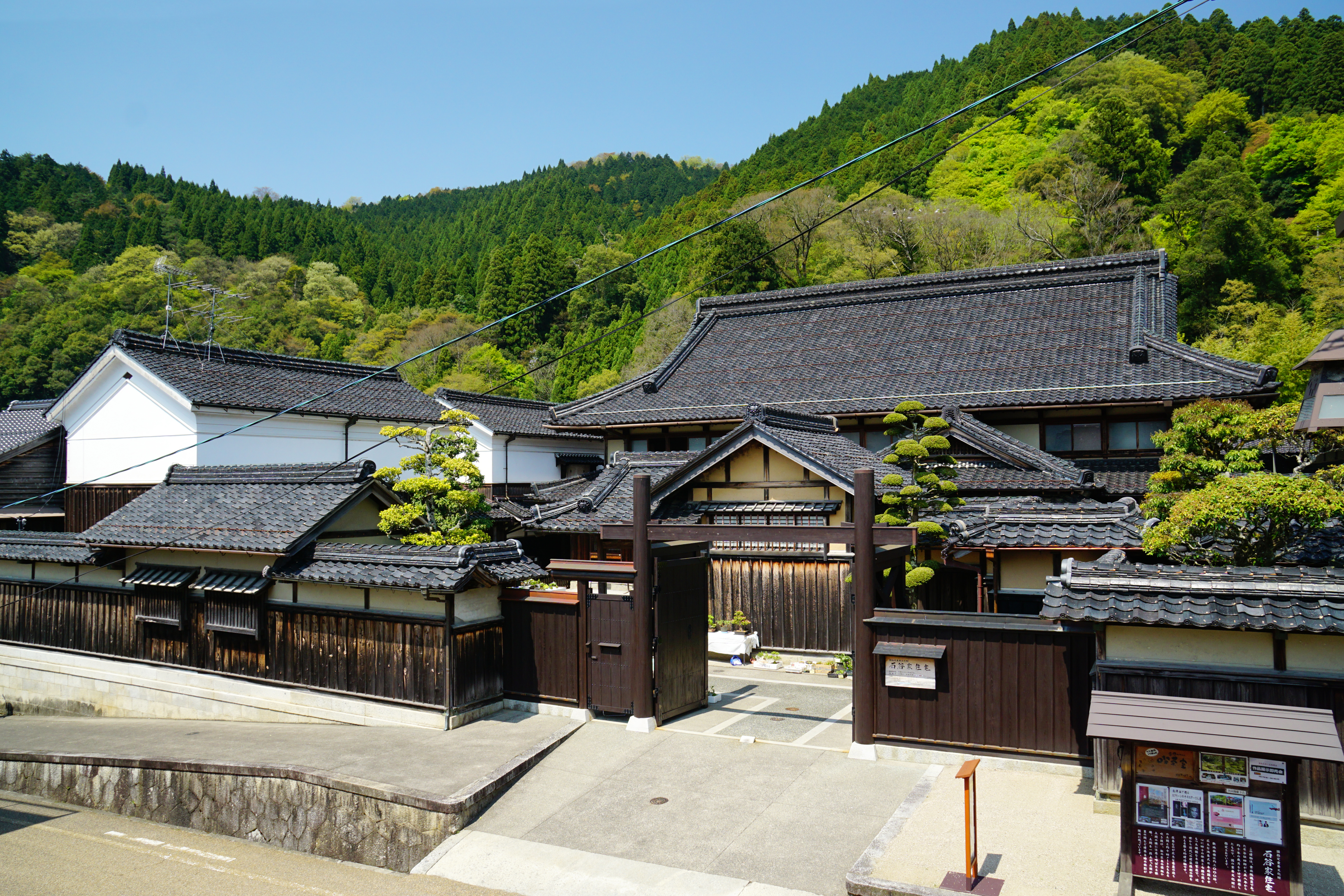
- Ishitani Residence in Chizu, Tottori Prefecture, Japan

- Location within Japan

General information
- Architectural style: Japanese Edo period
- Location: 2-121 Chizu, Chizu-machi, Yazu-gun, Tottori Prefecture, Japan 689-1402, Chizu, Japan
- Coordinates: 35.270403°N 134.230044°E
- Construction started: 1919
- Completed: 1929

Technical details
- Floor count: 2
- Floor area: 1,046 square metres (11,260 sq ft)

Website
- http://www.ifs.or.jp/

The Ishitani Residence (石谷家住宅, Ishitanike Jūtaku) is a family residence in Chizu, Tottori Prefecture, Japan. In the Edo period Chizu flourished as one of Japan's largest shukuba (宿場) or post stations, the Chizushuku (智頭宿) in Inaba Kaidō. The Ishitani family, an upper-class family, built a residence in the area. In the early 20th century the residence was greatly expanded by incorporating Western-style elements into the Japanese-style structure. The residence is spread across two floors and forty rooms. The Ishitani Residence is an important part of the Itaibara settlement. A number of its buildings have been designated Important Cultural Properties and its gardens are a registered Place of Scenic Beauty.

== See also ==
- List of Important Cultural Properties of Japan (Shōwa period: structures)
- List of Places of Scenic Beauty of Japan (Tottori)
