= Isao Takeuchi =

Japanese politician (1951–2026)

Isao Takeuchi 竹内功

Member of the House of Councillors of Japan
- In office 29 October 2021 – 25 July 2022

Mayor of Tottori
- In office 15 April 2002 – 14 April 2014

Personal details
- Born: 18 December 1951 Tottori, Tottori Prefecture, Japan
- Died: 24 September 2026 (aged 74) Tottori, Tottori Prefecture, Japan
- Party: Independent; Liberal Democratic Party

Isao Takeuchi (竹内功, 18 December 1951 – 24 September 2026) was a Japanese civil servant and politician. He began his career as a bureaucrat in the Ministry of Construction (now known as the Ministry of Land, Infrastructure, Transport and Tourism) beginning in 1974. In 2002, he was elected Mayor of Tottori city, defeating the incumbent mayor. He served three terms consecutive terms as Tottori's mayor for twelve years from 2002 until 2014.

During his first term, Mayor Takeuchi oversaw the 2004 merger of Tottori city with six surrounding towns and two villages to establish Tottori's modern city borders. Takeuchi also opened the Tottori Sand Museum, established new facilities at the West Japan Railway Company JR train station, and expanded the Tottori Expressway.

== Life and career ==
Takeuchi was born and raised in Tottori. He graduated from the faculty of law at the University of Tokyo. Following graduation, he joined the Ministry of Construction as a civil servant, eventually serving as the ministry's Director of General Affairs in Shimane Prefecture and Director of Planning in Tottori Prefecture.

After leaving the mayoral office, Takeuchi ran for a proportional seat in the House of Councillors in the 2016 general election, but lost the election. However, in October 2021, Takeuchi was elected to the House of Councillors as a proportional seat senator, serving one term in office from October 2021 until July 2022.

Takeuchi died from a cerebral haemorrhage at a hospital in Tottori, on 24 September 2026, at the age of 74. His funeral was held in Tottori on 26 September.
