= Tottoridaigakumae Station =

Railway station in Tottori, Tottori Prefecture, Japan

Tottoridaigakumae Station 鳥取大学前駅
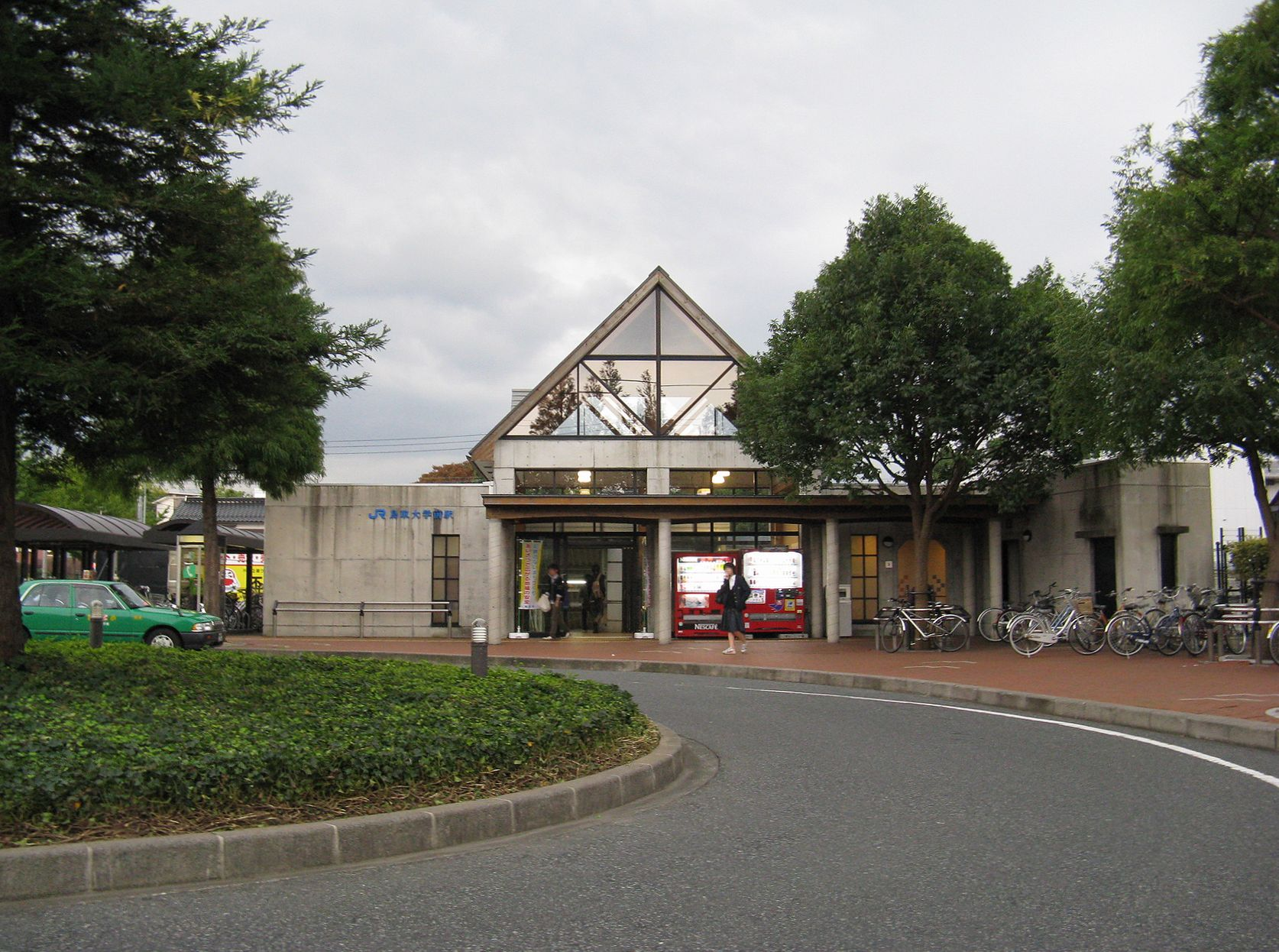
- Tottoridaigakumae Station

General information
- Location: 2 Chome Koyamachokita, Tottori-shi, Tottori-ken 680-0941; Japan
- Coordinates: 35°31′5.54″N 134°10′28.11″E
- Operator: JR West
- Line: San'in Main Line
- Distance: 235.8 km (146.5 miles) from Kyoto
- Platforms: 1 side platform
- Tracks: 1

Construction
- Structure type: At grade

Other information
- Status: Staffed
- Website: Official website

History
- Opened: 27 July 1995

Passengers
- 2020: 1534 daily
Location
- Location within Tottori Prefecture Location within Japan

Tottoridaigakumae Station (鳥取大学前駅, Tottoridaigakumae-eki) is a passenger railway station located in the city of Tottori, Tottori Prefecture, Japan. It is operated by the West Japan Railway Company (JR West). The name of the station translates to Station in front of Tottori University.

== Lines ==
Tottoridaigakumae Station is served by the San'in Main Line, and is located 235.8 kilometers from the terminus of the line at Kyoto.

== Station layout ==
The station consists of one side platform with the platform is located one step below the station building due to topographical reasons. The station is staffed.

=== Platforms ===
| 1 | ■ San'in Main Line | for Hamasaka and Tottori |
| 2 | ■ San'in Main Line | for Kurayoshi and Yonago |

== Adjacent stations ==
West Japan Railway Company (JR West)

| « | Service | » |
Sanin Main Line
Limited Express Super Oki: Does not stop at this station
Limited Express Super Matsukaze: Does not stop at this station
| Koyama | Express "Tottori Liner" | Hamamura |
| Koyama | Local | Suetsune |

== History ==
Tottoridaigakumae Station opened on 27 July 1995.

== Passenger statistics ==
In fiscal 2020, the station was used by an average of 1534 passengers daily.

== See also ==
- List of railway stations in Japan
