= Former site of the Japanese Legation =

The former site of the Japanese Legation (Chinese: 日本公使馆旧址), located at 21 and 23 Dongjiaoming Lane, Dongcheng District, Beijing, is the former site of the Imperial Japanese Legation to the Qing Empire before the Boxer Rebellion of 1900.

== History ==
In 1872, Japan opened its legation in Beijing, initially utilizing a private residence purchased in Dongsi Liujiao Hutong. At that time, all the foreign embassies were located in Peking Legation Quarter (now called Dongjiaominxiang), the Japanese Minister applied for funds from the Japanese government, purchased a private house in Peking Legation Quarter and expanded it. On August 6, 1884, the Japanese Ministry of Foreign Affairs hired Katayama Tōkuma as the design of the Embassy and supervision of the project. In May 1885, the construction began, and In August 1886, it completed.

The former Japanese Legation is the earliest surviving building in the Peking Legation Quarter, and is the only 19th-century building in the area that has survived to the present day. During the People's Republic of China period, the building became the dormitory of the Beijing Municipal Committee of the Chinese Communist Party. In January 2019, as the Beijing Municipal Administrative Center moves into the Beijing Municipal Administrative Center (Beijing MC), the CCP Beijing Municipal Committee is moving out of this and nearby buildings.
