= Kaigara Bushi =

Japanese work song

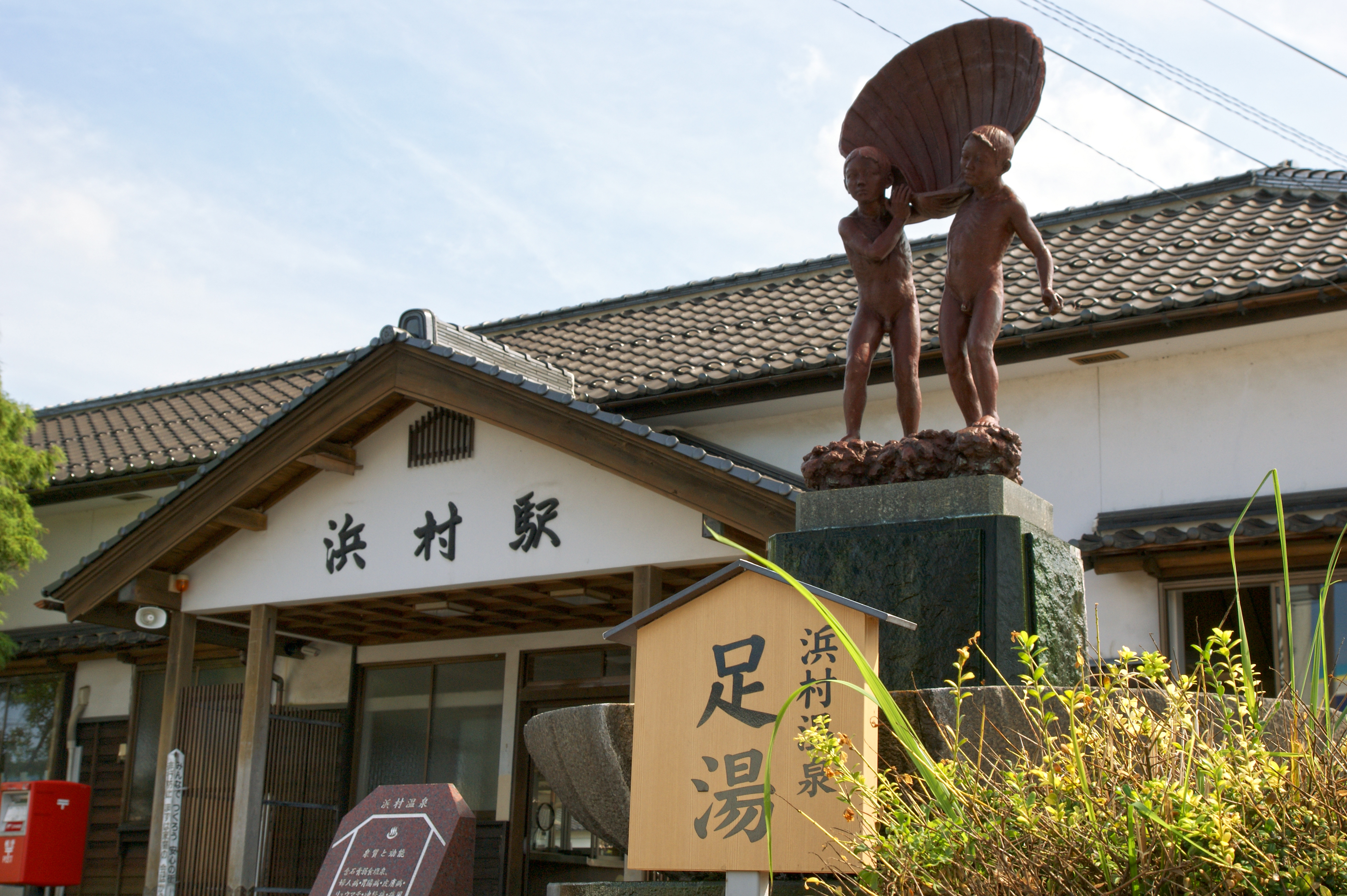
The Kaigarabushi statue in front of Hamamura Station of JR San'in Main Line

Kaigara Bushi (Japanese: 貝殻節, literally Shell tune), also spelled Kaigarabushi or Kaigara-bushi, is a Japanese folk song that originated in Hamamura Onsen, Ketaka Town, Tottori City, Tottori Prefecture. It is a work song of the fishermen who worked on the Japan Sea coast.

== History ==
It is not known when this folk song originated. On the sea coast of Hamamura Onsen (ja:浜村温泉), Ketaka Town (ja:気高町), Tottori City in central Tottori Prefecture, there used to appear in several year cycles abundant shellfish, which the fishermen caught by bottom trawling. Rowing the boat pulling the trawling net was such hard labor that the rowers used to sing this song, consoling themselves.

== Words ==
The most common words of this folk song starts with "Nan no inga de kaigara kogi narouta?", which means "What destiny has made me to row the boat to catch shellfish?"

== Dance ==
Several styles of dance to this music are known. They are most popular at the bon dances in Tottori Prefecture and the nearby prefectures. Each August, a festival of Kaigara Bushi dance, fire displays and local food is held in Ketaka Town, Tottori City.

Professional dancers, such as the geisha at indoor dances in Hamamura Onsen, sometimes hold small dishes so they can imitate clacking of the shells.

== See also ==
- Bon dance
- Work song
