= Hamamura Station =

Railway station in Tottori, Tottori Prefecture, Japan

Hamamura Station 浜村駅
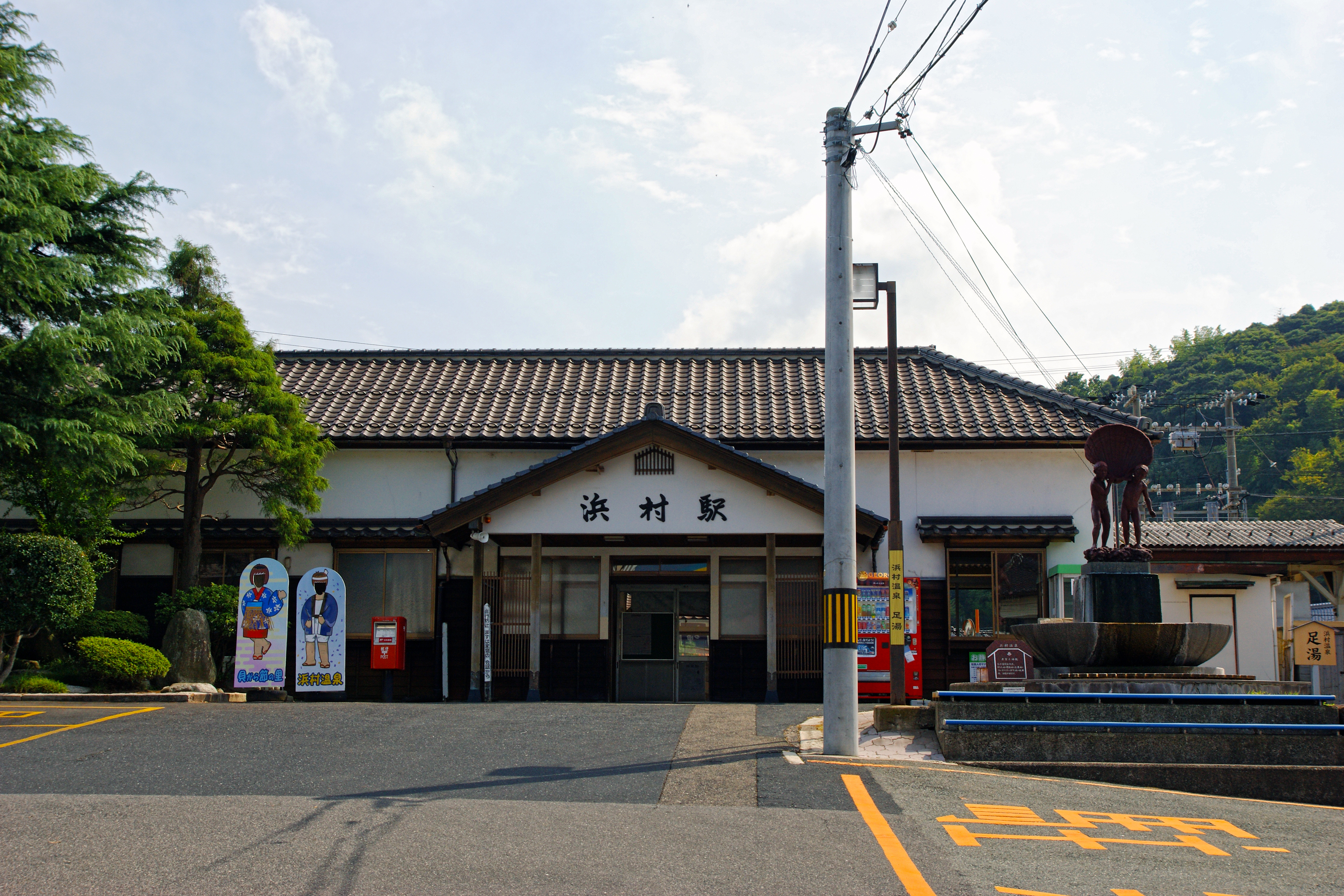
- Hamamura Station

General information
- Location: 682 Katsumi, Ketaka-cho, Tottori-shi, Tottori-ken 689-0332; Japan
- Coordinates: 35°30′34.27″N 134°3′2.69″E
- Operator: JR West
- Line: San'in Main Line
- Distance: 252.8 km (157.1 miles) from Kyoto
- Platforms: 2 side platforms
- Tracks: 2

Construction
- Structure type: At grade

Other information
- Status: Unstaffed
- Website: Official website

History
- Opened: 28 April 1907

Passengers
- 2020: 392 daily
Location
- Location within Tottori Prefecture Location within Japan

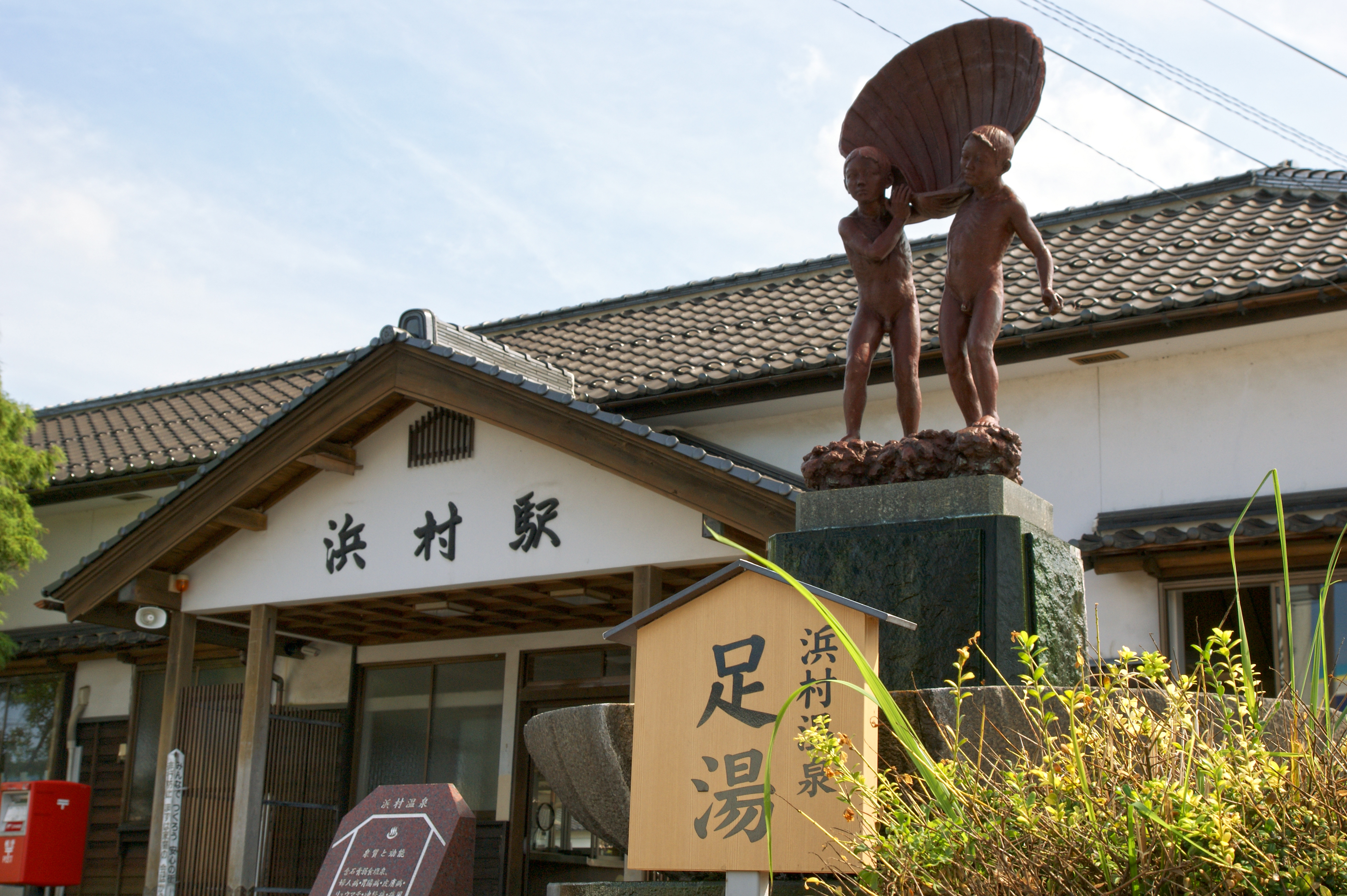
Hamamura Station

Hamamura Station (浜村駅, Hamamura-eki) is a passenger railway station located in the city of Tottori, Tottori Prefecture, Japan. It is operated by the West Japan Railway Company (JR West).

== Lines ==
Hamamura Station is served by the San'in Main Line, and is located 247.6 kilometers from the terminus of the line at Kyoto.

== Station layout ==
The station consists of two ground-level opposed side platforms connected by a footbridge to the station building. The station is unattended.

=== Platforms ===
1	■ San'in Main Line	for Hamasaka and Tottori
2	■ San'in Main Line	for Kurayoshi and Yonago

== Adjacent stations ==
West Japan Railway Company (JR West)

«	Service	»
Sanin Main Line
Limited Express Super Oki: Does not stop at this station
Limited Express Super Matsukaze: Does not stop at this station
Tottoridaigakumae	Express "Tottori Liner"	Aoya
Hōgi	Local	Aoya

== History ==
Hamamura Station opened on April 28, 1907. With the privatization of the Japan National Railways (JNR) on April 1, 1987, the station came under the aegis of the West Japan Railway Company.

== Passenger statistics ==
In fiscal 2020, the station was used by an average of 392 passengers daily.

== Surrounding area ==
- Hamamura Onsen Tourist Information Center
- Ketaka Town General Branch
- Tottori City Ketaka Library
- Tottori Municipal Hamamura Elementary School

== See also ==
- List of railway stations in Japan
