= Aoya Station =

Railway station in Tottori, Tottori Prefecture, Japan

Aoya Station 青谷駅
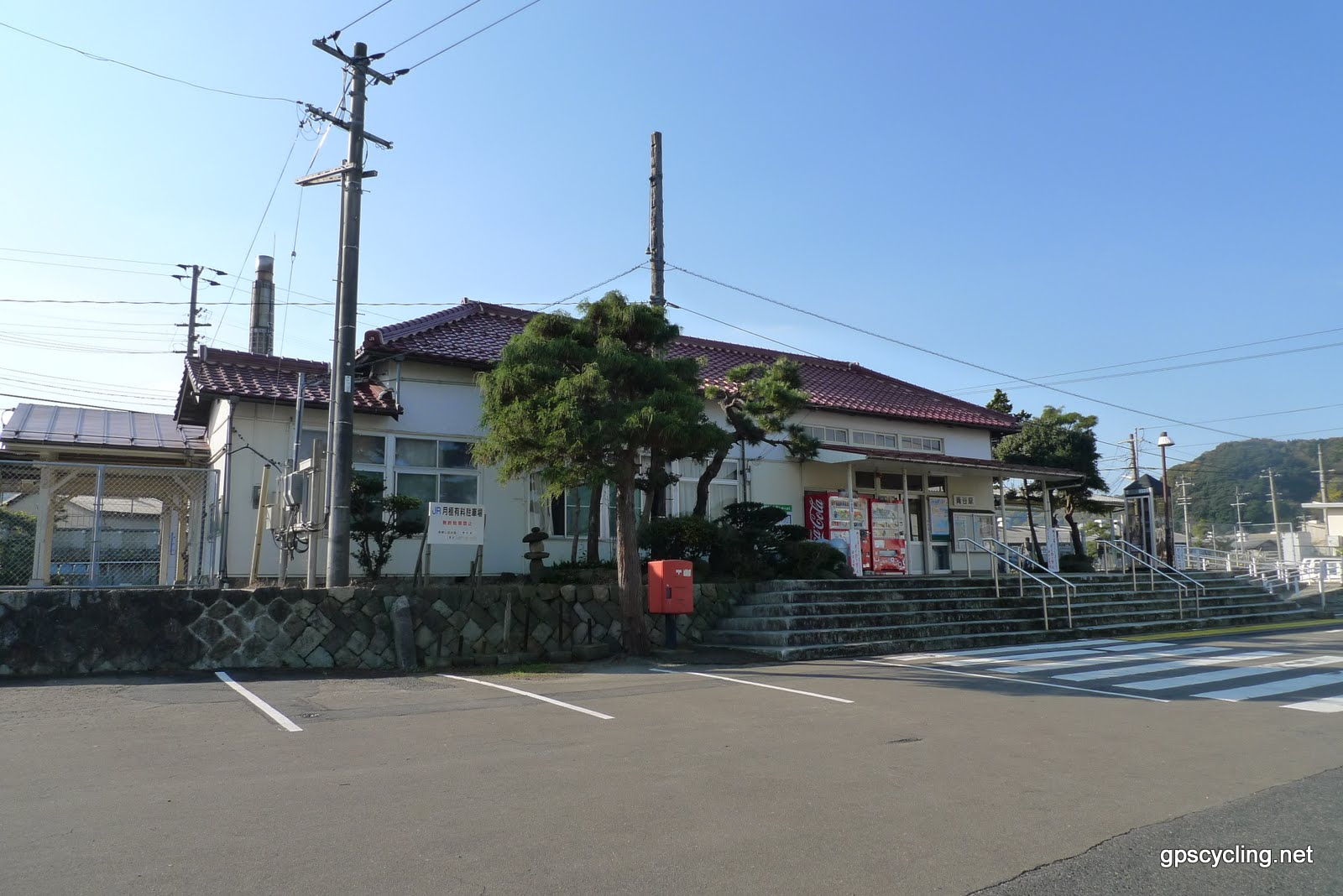
- Aoya Station

General information
- Location: Aoyacho Aoya, Tottori-shi, Tottori-ken 689-0501; Japan
- Coordinates: 35°30′58.43″N 133°59′44.60″E
- Operator: JR West
- Line: San'in Main Line
- Distance: 252.8 km (157.1 miles) from Kyoto
- Platforms: 1 side + 1 island platform
- Tracks: 3

Construction
- Structure type: At grade

Other information
- Status: Unstaffed
- Website: Official website

History
- Opened: 15 May 1905

Passengers
- 2020: 389 daily

Services
Preceding station	JR West	Following station
Tomari towards Yonago	San'in Line Local	Hamamura towards Kinosaki-Onsen
Tomari towards Yonago	San'in Line Tottori Liner	Hamamura towards Kinosaki-Onsen
Location
- Location within Tottori Prefecture Location within Japan

Aoya Station (青谷駅, Aoya-eki) is a passenger railway station located in the city of Tottori, Tottori Prefecture, Japan. It is operated by the West Japan Railway Company (JR West).

== Lines ==
Aoya Station is served by the San'in Main Line, and is located 252.8 kilometers from the terminus of the line at Kyoto.

== Station layout ==
The station consists of one ground-level side platform and one island platform connected by a footbridge to the station building. The station is unattended.

=== Platforms ===
1	■ San'in Main Line	for Hamasaka and Tottori
2, 3	■ San'in Main Line	for Kurayoshi and Yonago

== History ==
Aoya Station opened on May 15, 1905. With the privatization of the Japan National Railways (JNR) on April 1, 1987, the station came under the aegis of the West Japan Railway Company.

== Passenger statistics ==
In fiscal 2020, the station was used by an average of 389 passengers daily.

== Surrounding area ==
- Tottori City Hall Aoya Town General Branch (former Aoya Town Office)
- Tottori Prefectural Aoya High School
- Tottori City Aoya Junior High School
- Tottori City Aoya Elementary School

== See also ==
- List of railway stations in Japan
