= Jinpūkaku =

- 仁風閣
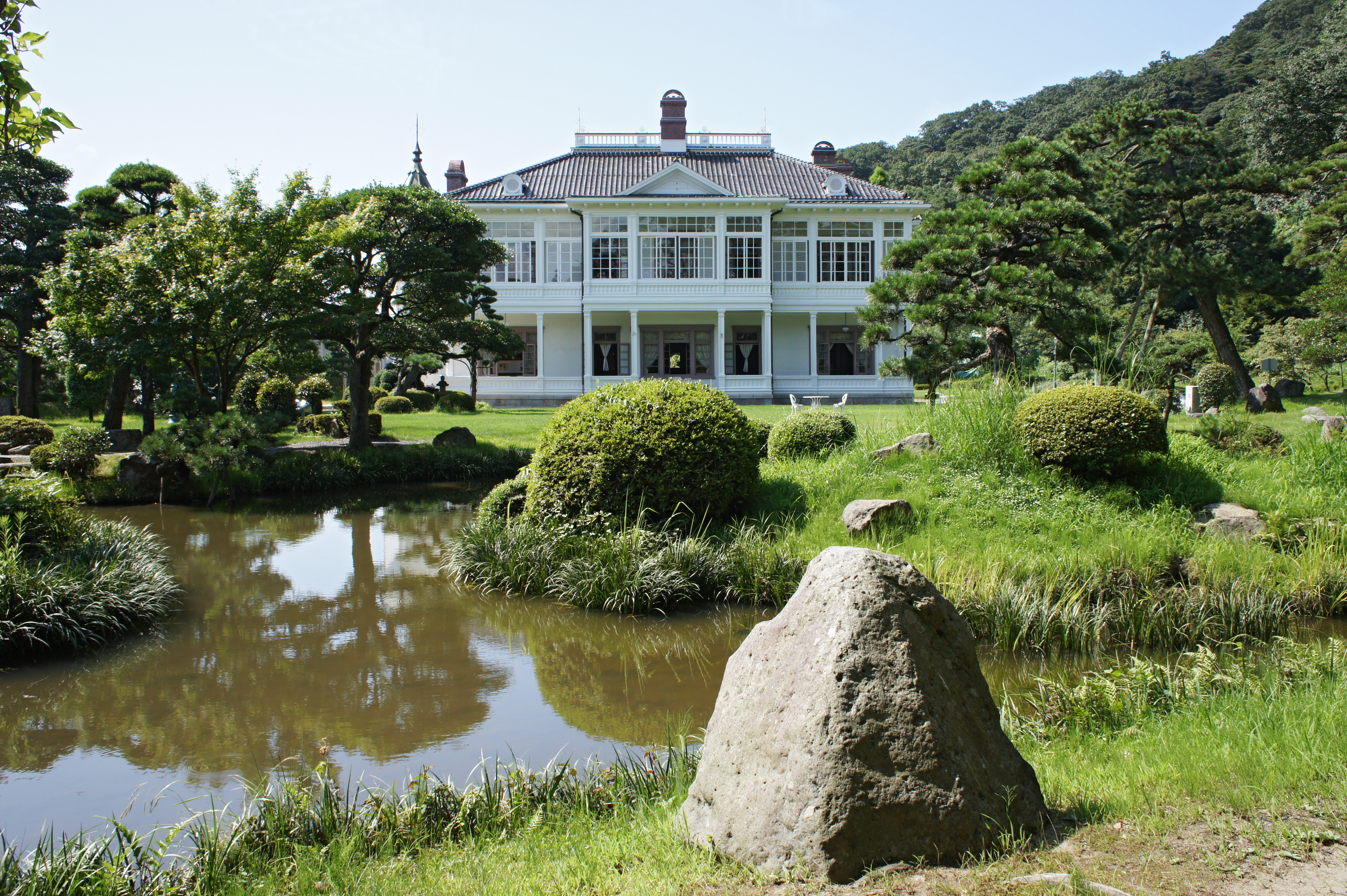
- Jinpukaku in Tottori, Tottori Prefecture, Japan

- Location within Tottori Prefecture Jinpūkaku (Japan)

General information
- Architectural style: Neo-Renaissance
- Location: 2-121 Higashi-machi, Tottori-shi, Tottori-ken, Japan 680-0011, Japan
- Coordinates: 35.5071263°N 134.2374716°E
- Construction started: 1906
- Completed: 1907
- Renovated: 1973
- Cost: 43335 yen
- Client: Nakahiro Ikeda
- Owner: City of Tottori, Tottori Prefecture, Japan

Technical details
- Floor count: 2
- Floor area: 1,046 square metres (11,260 sq ft)

Design and construction
- Architect: Katayama Tōkuma

Website
- http://www.tbz.or.jp/jinpuukaku/

Jinpūkaku (仁風閣, Jinpūkaku) is a Western-style French Renaissance style residence of the Ikeda clan located in Tottori, Tottori Prefecture, Japan.

== History ==
Jinpūkaku was commissioned in 1906 by the 14th daimyō of the Ikeda clan, Nakahiro Ikeda (1877–1948). The residence was designed by the Meiji period architect Katayama Tōkuma (1854–1917), and covers 1,046 square metres (11,260 sq ft) on a site of 7,200 square metres (78,000 sq ft), and was completed in 1907. Jinpūkaku resembles Tōkuma's Nara National Museum (1894) and Akasaka Palace (1909), and cost 43,335 yen to build. Jinpūkaku was built in close proximity to the ruins of Tottori Castle, which was long controlled by the Ikeda clan, and Kōzen-ji, the temple of the Ikeda family.

== Association with Emperor Taishō ==
Ikeda ostensibly commissioned Jinpūkaku as a detached residence for the family, but it was likely constructed to house Crown Prince Yoshihito, later Emperor Taishō on his tour of the San'in Region in 1907, the same year construction on the residence was completed. Ikeda was closely associated with Tōgō Heihachirō (1848–1934), Fleet Admiral in the Imperial Japanese Navy, who accompanied the Emperor Taishō on the tour and gave the residence its name. A nameplate with Tōgō's inscription is prominently displayed in the second floor hall of the structure. Jinpūkaku was the first residence in Tottori to be electrified, and as such was a symbol of the progress of the Meiji period to local residents.

== Later history ==
After the Meiji period Jinpūkaku was used as a welcome hall and public gathering place by the City of Tottori. The structure was significantly damaged in the 1943 Tottori earthquake. The chimneys of the structure protruded through the roof. During the repairs after the earthquake a slate roof was placed on the residence. Jinpūkaku housed the predecessor of the Tottori Prefectural Museum from 1949 until the museum was relocated to its current structure in 1972. The structure was designated as one of the Important Cultural Properties of Japan in 1973, and an extensive renovation was carried out for the following three years. The residence is open to the public, and includes a display of materials related to the Ikeda clan.

The site was used as the backdrop for filming one of the major fight scenes in 2012 live-action Rurouni Kenshin (film).

== Nearby attractions ==
Jinpūkaku is located in close proximity to the Tottori Castle remains, Kōzen-ji, the family temple of the Ikeda Clan, the Tottori Prefectural Museum, and the Warabekan Toy Museum. Jinpūkaku and its surrounding area are especially popular with residents and tourists during the hanami cherry blossom viewing season.

== Transportation ==
Jinpūkaku is accessible via Tottori Station, which is served by the JR West Sanin Main Line. The residence is connected to the station by bus. The walking distance is 30 minutes.

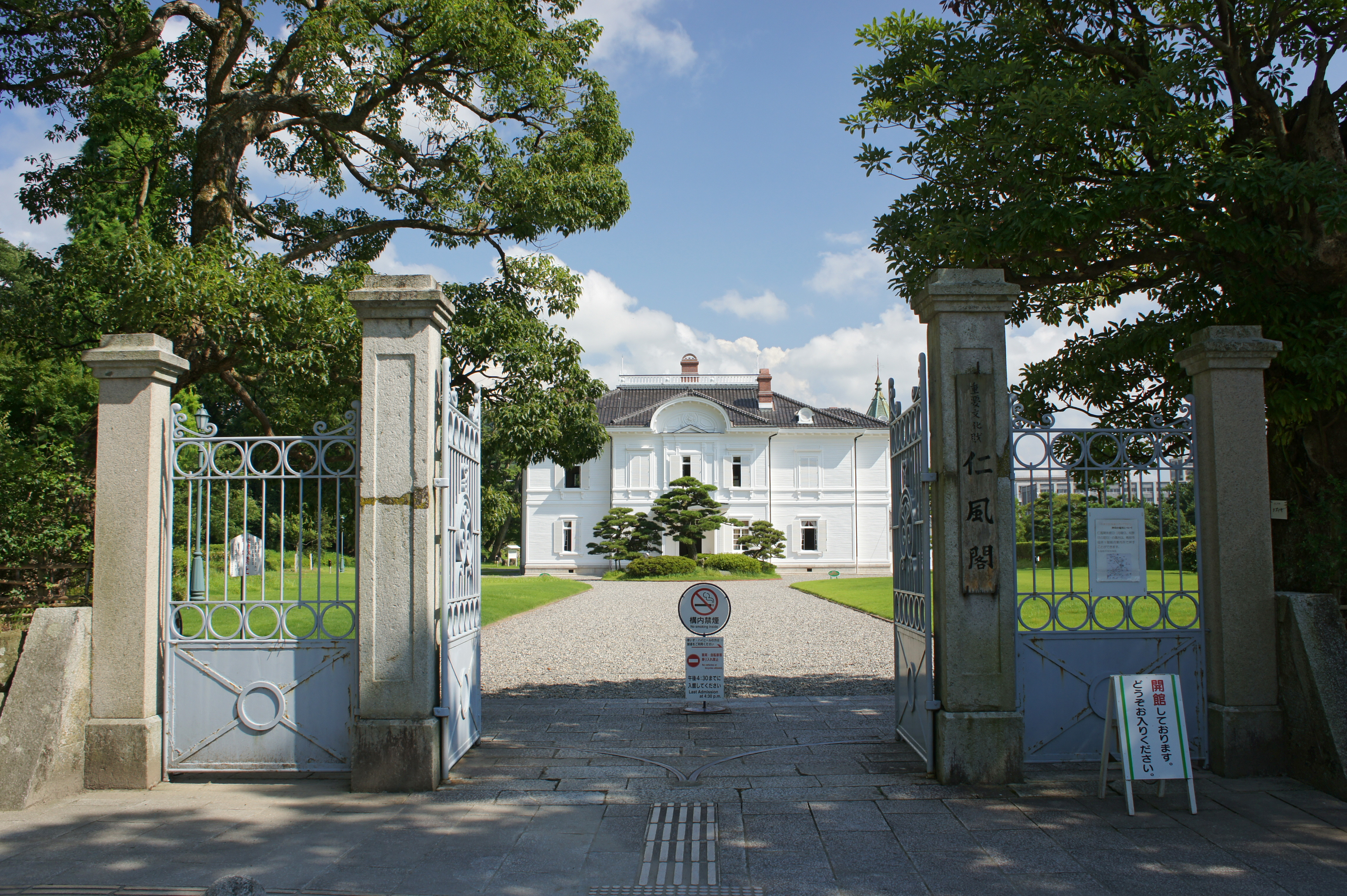
Entry gate

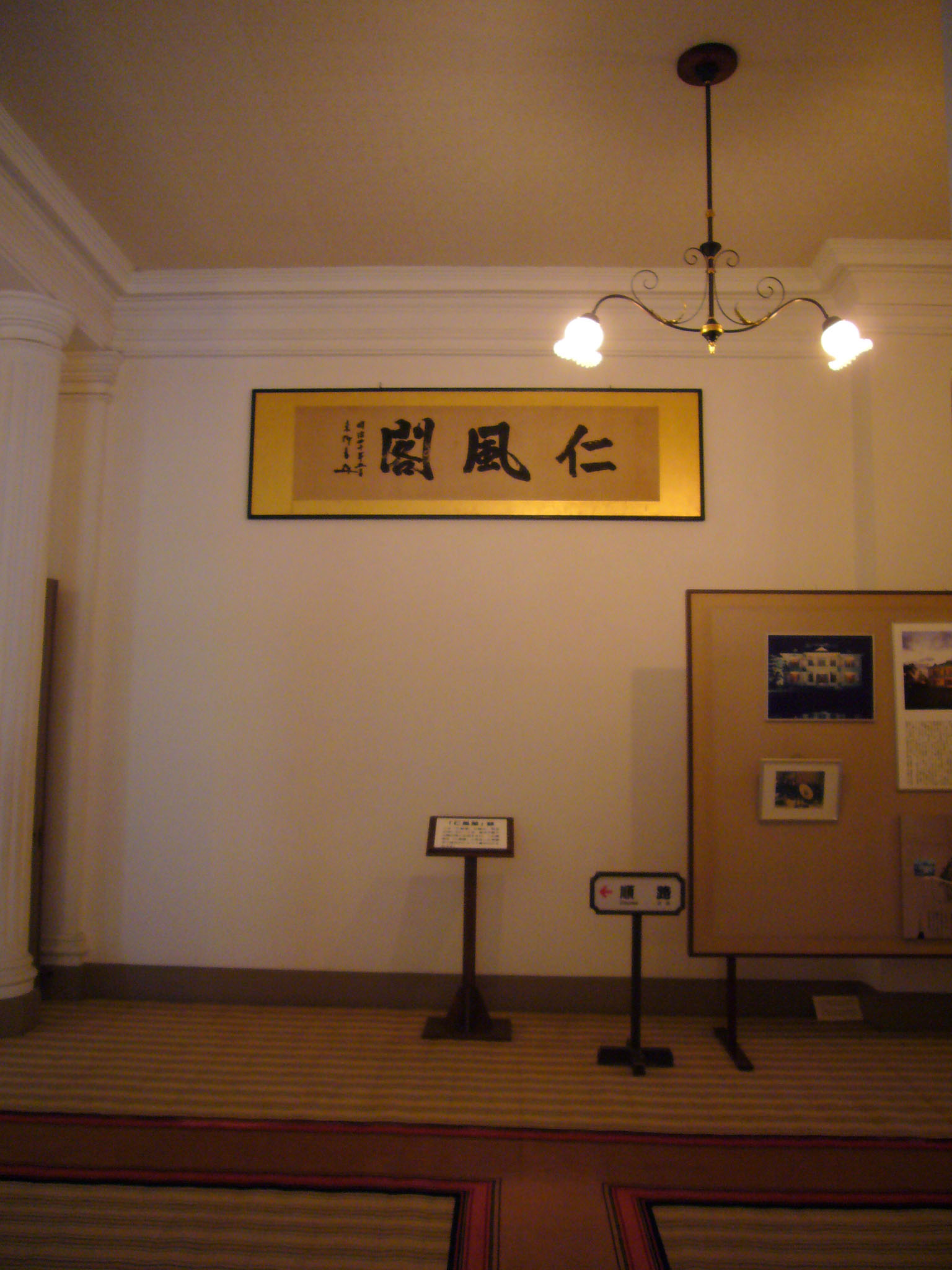
Inscription by Tōgō Heihachirō

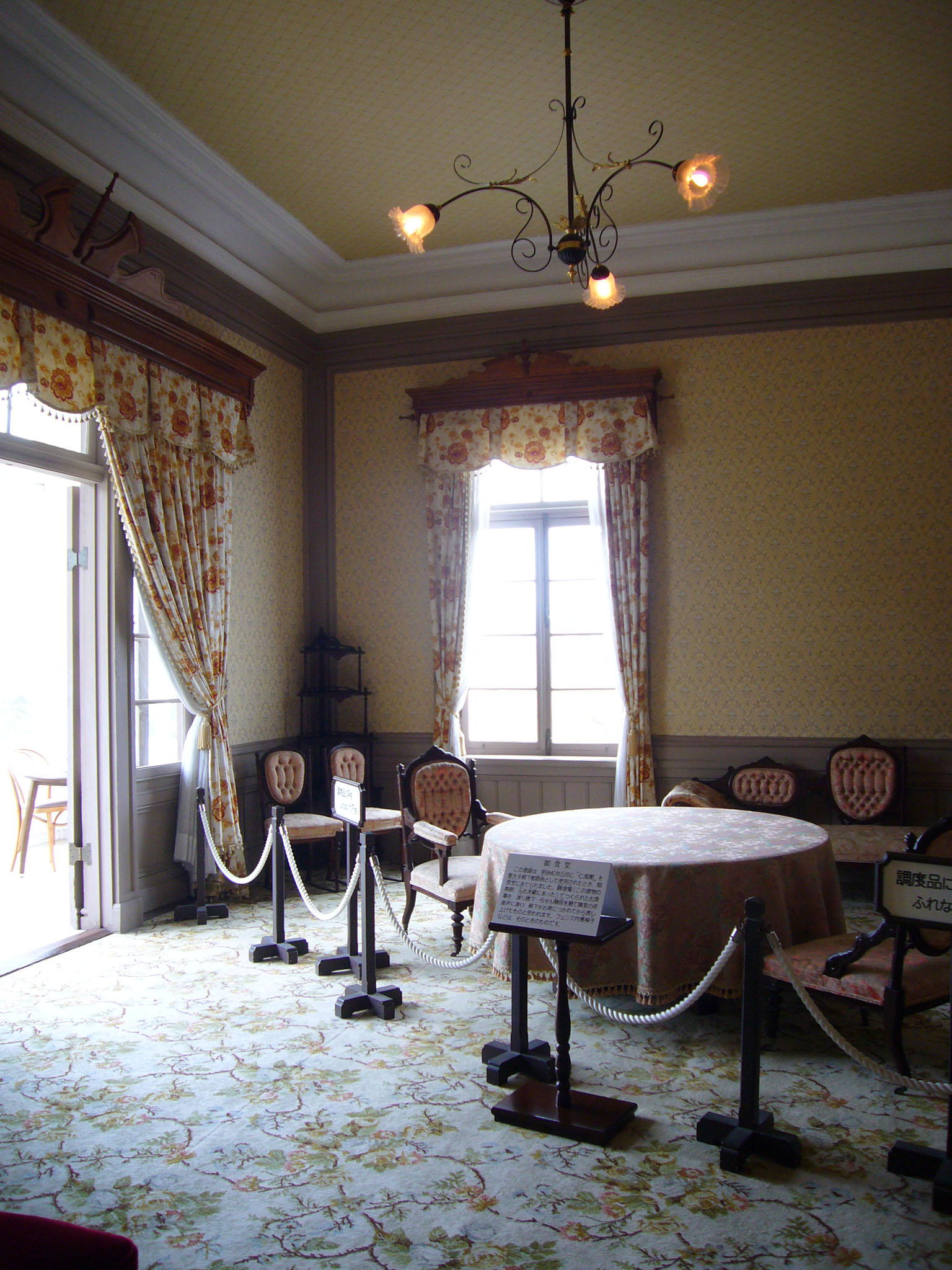
Dining area

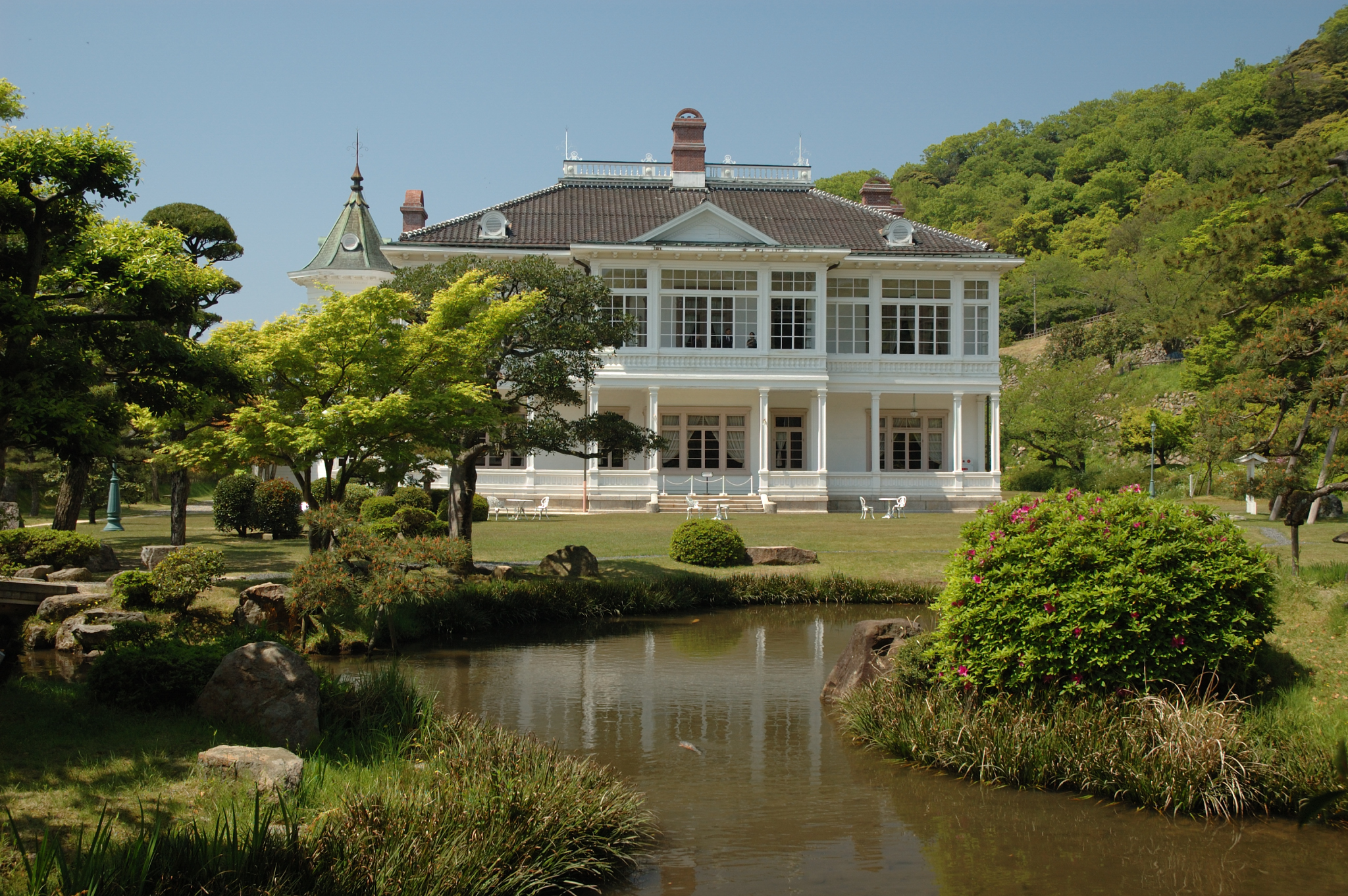
Japanese garden

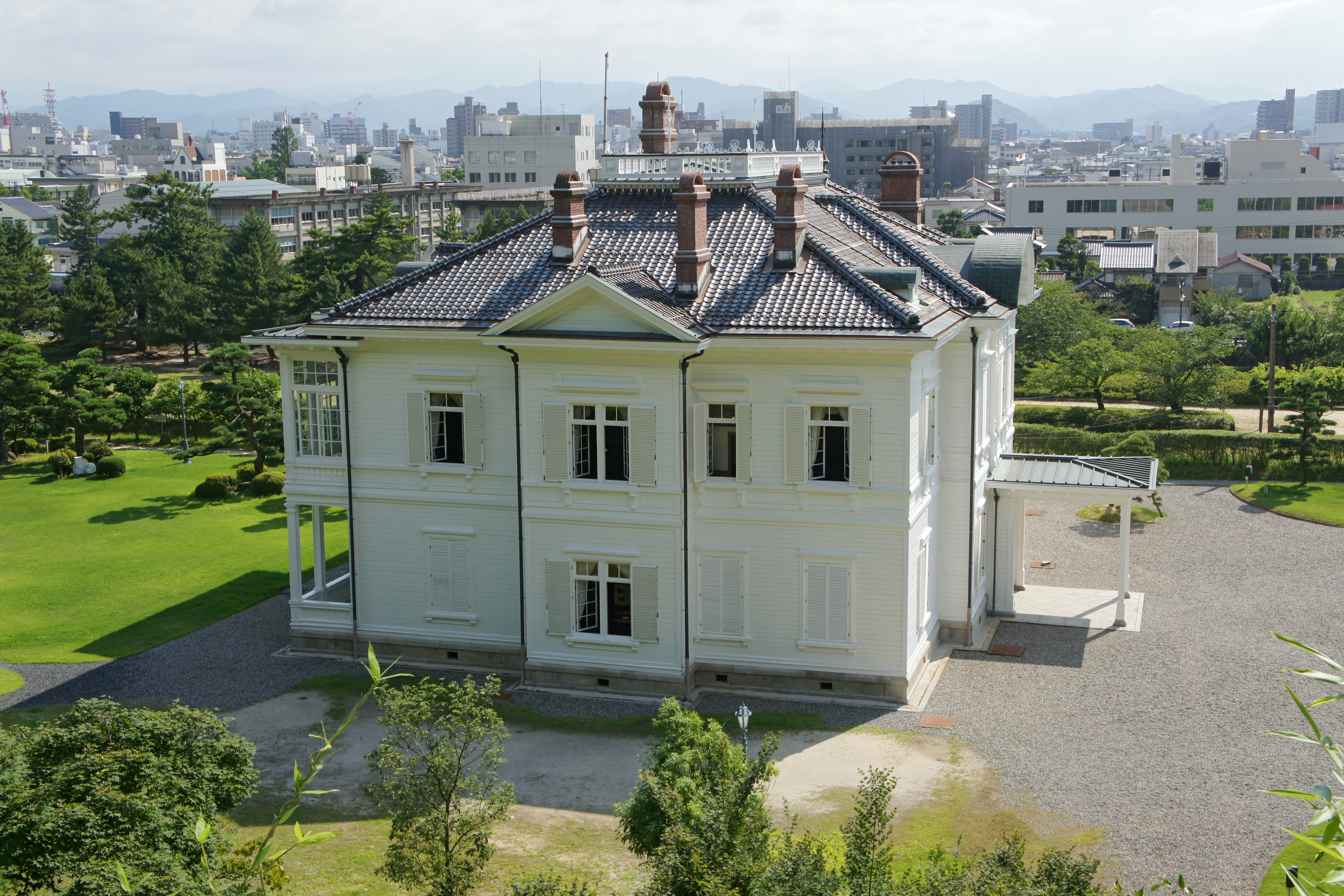
Tottori City behind Jinpūkaku

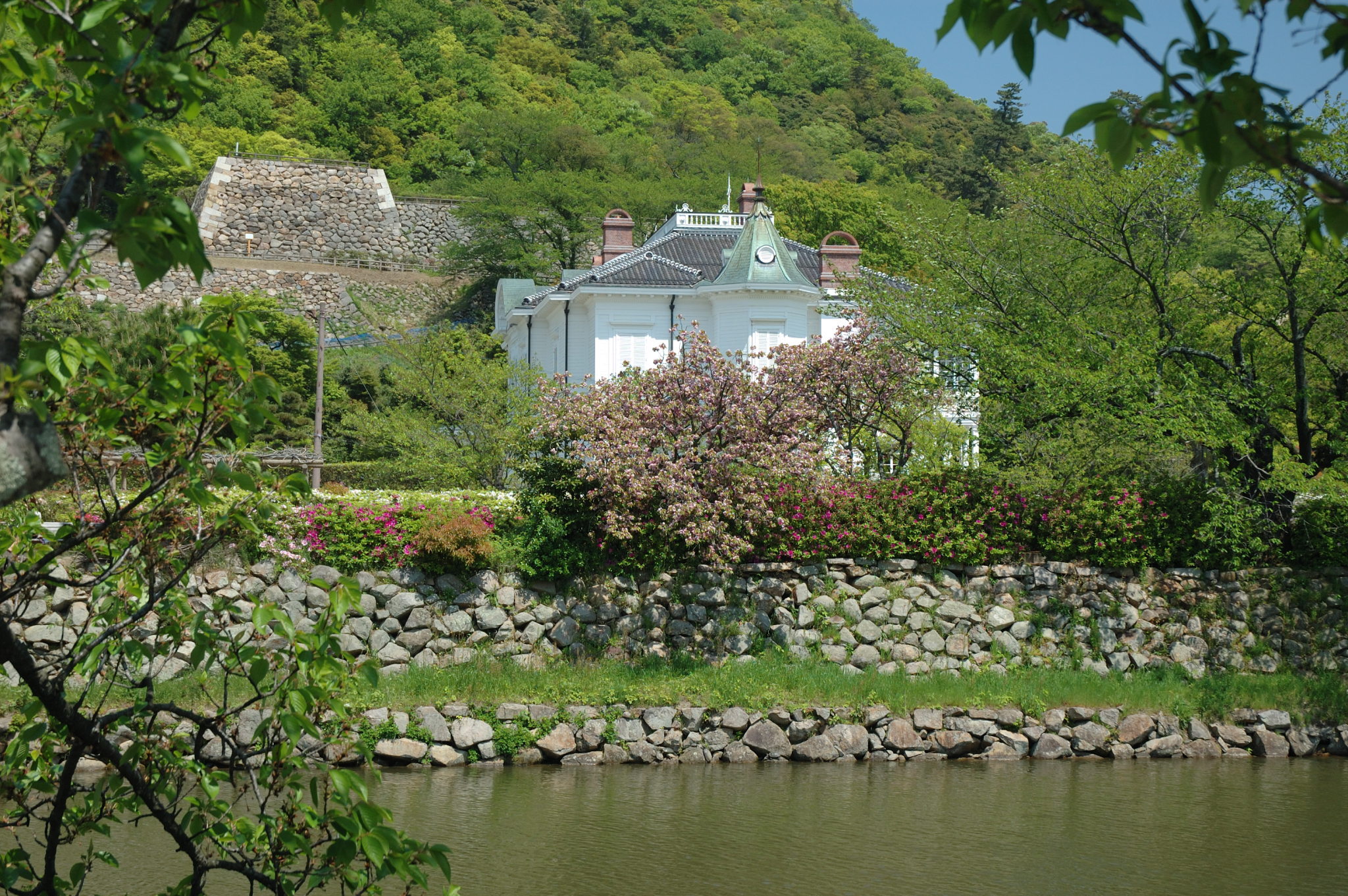
Ruins of Tottori Castle above Jinpūkaku
