= Katayama Tōkuma =

Japanese architect (1854–1917)

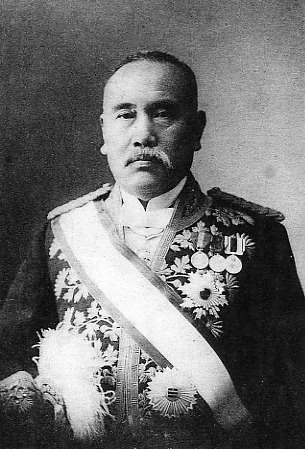
Katayama Tōkuma

Katayama Tōkuma (片山 東熊; 18 January 1854 – 24 October 1917) was a Japanese architect who designed the original buildings for the Imperial Nara Museum as well as the Kyoto Imperial Museum and was significant in introducing Western, particularly French architecture into Japan.

Coming from Chōshū, Tōkuma was a protégé of Yamagata Aritomo. In 1879 he graduated from the Imperial College of Engineering. During his late twenties and early thirties he assisted Josiah Conder in designing and building a Western-style residence for Prince Arisugawa Taruhito and then on the new Imperial Palace in Tokyo. During the 1880 he was sent to Europe and America to study interior decoration, including furniture. In 1887 he was appointed as an officer in the construction office of the Imperial Household.

== Buildings ==
- 1894: Nara Imperial Museum, now the Nara National Museum
- 1895: Kyoto Imperial Museum, now the Kyoto National Museum
- 1905: Museum of Agriculture (神宮農業館), Ise, Mie Prefecture
- 1909: Tōgu Palace, now Akasaka Palace
- 1907: Jinpūkaku, Tottori, Tottori Prefecture

== Gallery ==
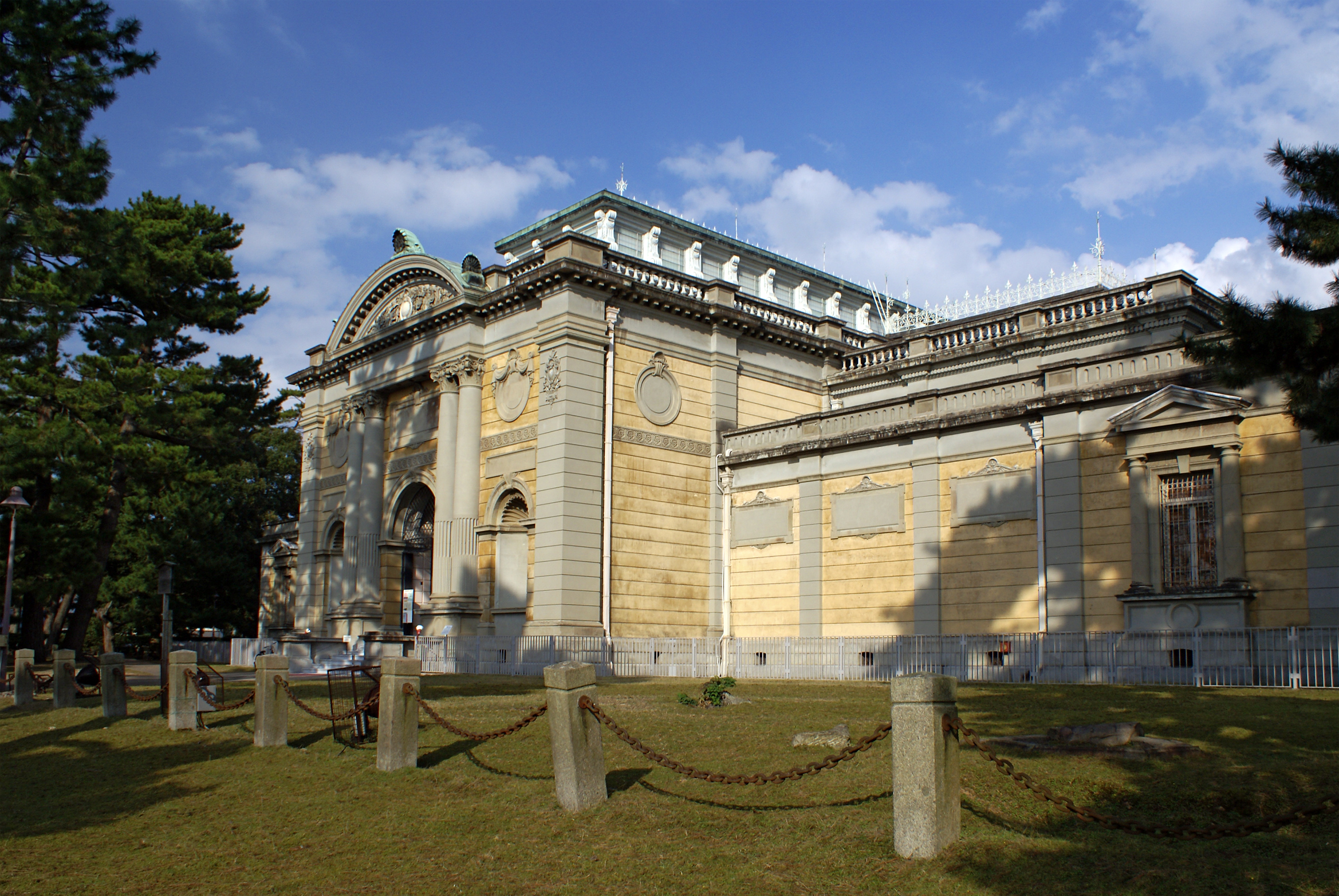
Nara National Museum in Nara, Built in 1894

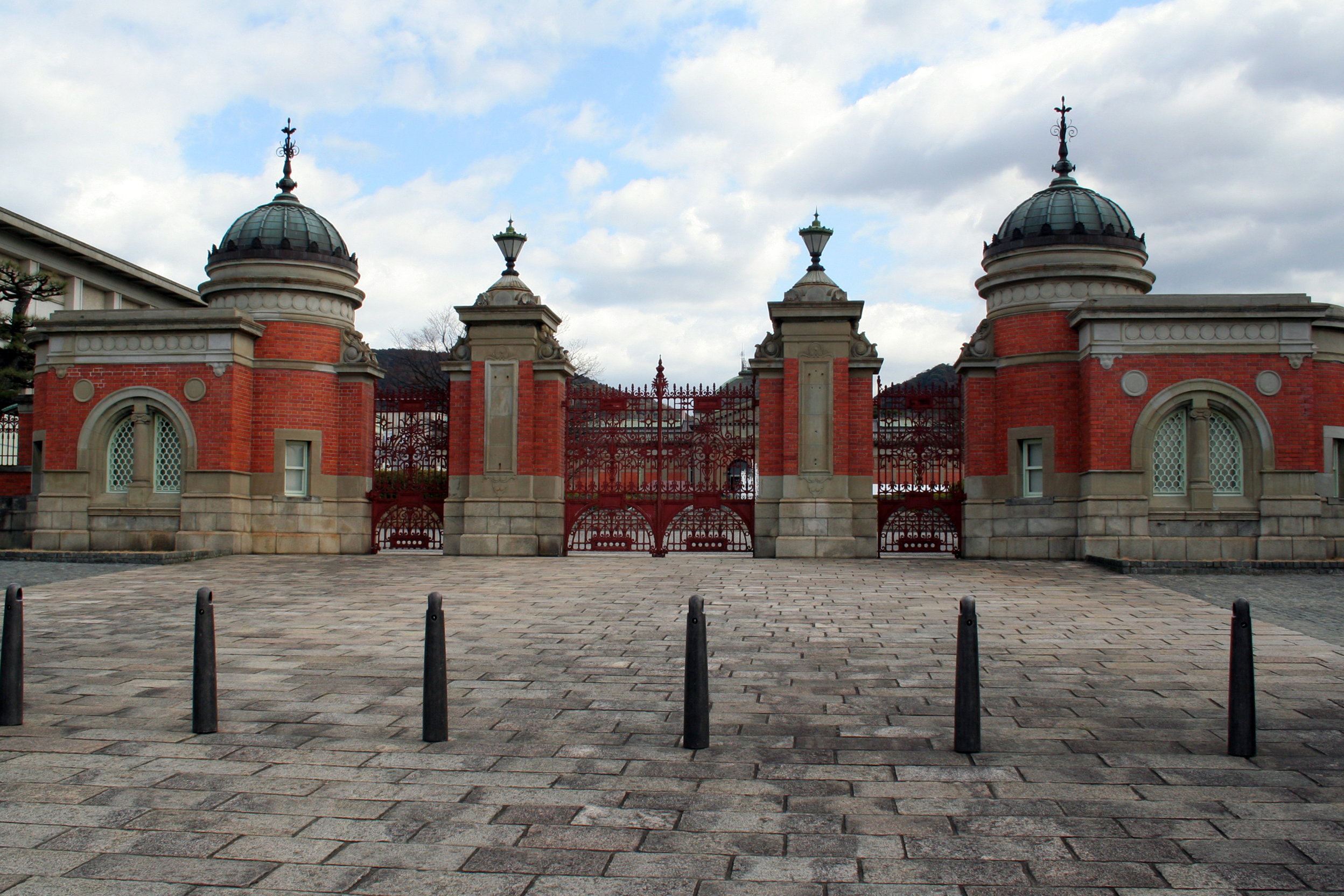
Kyoto National Museum in Kyōto, Built in 1895
