= Tottori University of Environmental Studies =

Coordinates: 35°27′03″N 134°15′18″E

- 鳥取環境大学 (Tottori Kankyō Daigaku)
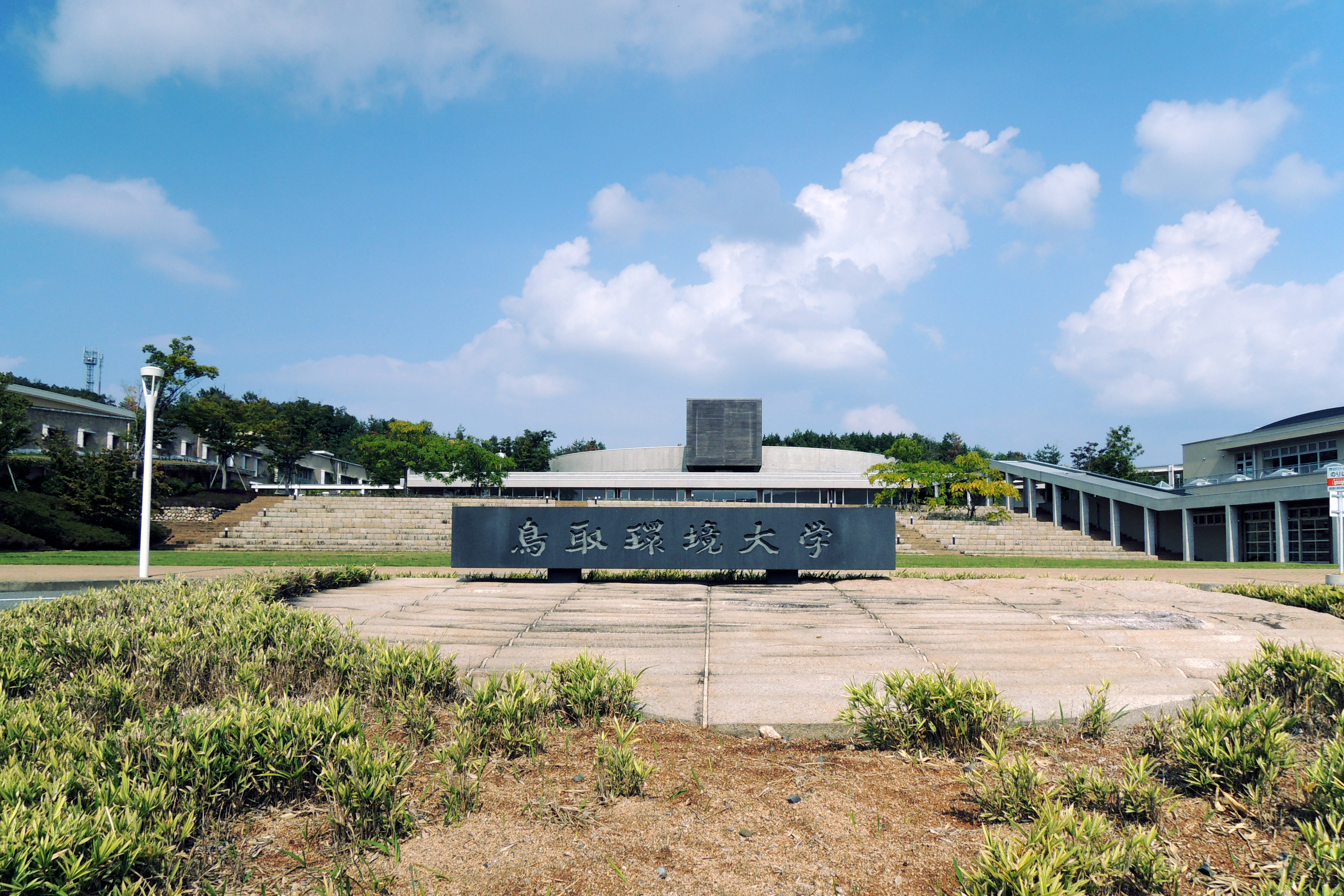
- Type: Public university under the jurisdiction of the prefecture and city of Tottori
- Established: April 4, 2001
- Location: 1-1-1 Wakabadaikita; Tottori-shi, 689-1111, Tottori, Tottori Prefecture, Japan
- Website: https://www.kankyo-u.ac.jp/

Tottori University of Environmental Studies (鳥取環境大学, Tottori Kankyō Daigaku) is a small public university in Tottori, Tottori Prefecture, Japan. It is under the jurisdiction of the city and prefecture of Tottori.

== History ==
- April, 2001 - Opening
- 2005 - Establishment of Ecoinformatics Graduate Research Department, featuring a masters program in Ecoinformatics. Particular areas of study include Environmental sociology, Environmental design, and Information Systems.

== Departments ==
Faculty of Environmental Studies; Faculty of Business Administration; Humanities Center.

== Graduate school ==
- Ecoinformatics Research Course
