= Koyama Station =

Railway station in Tottori, Japan

Koyama Station 湖山駅
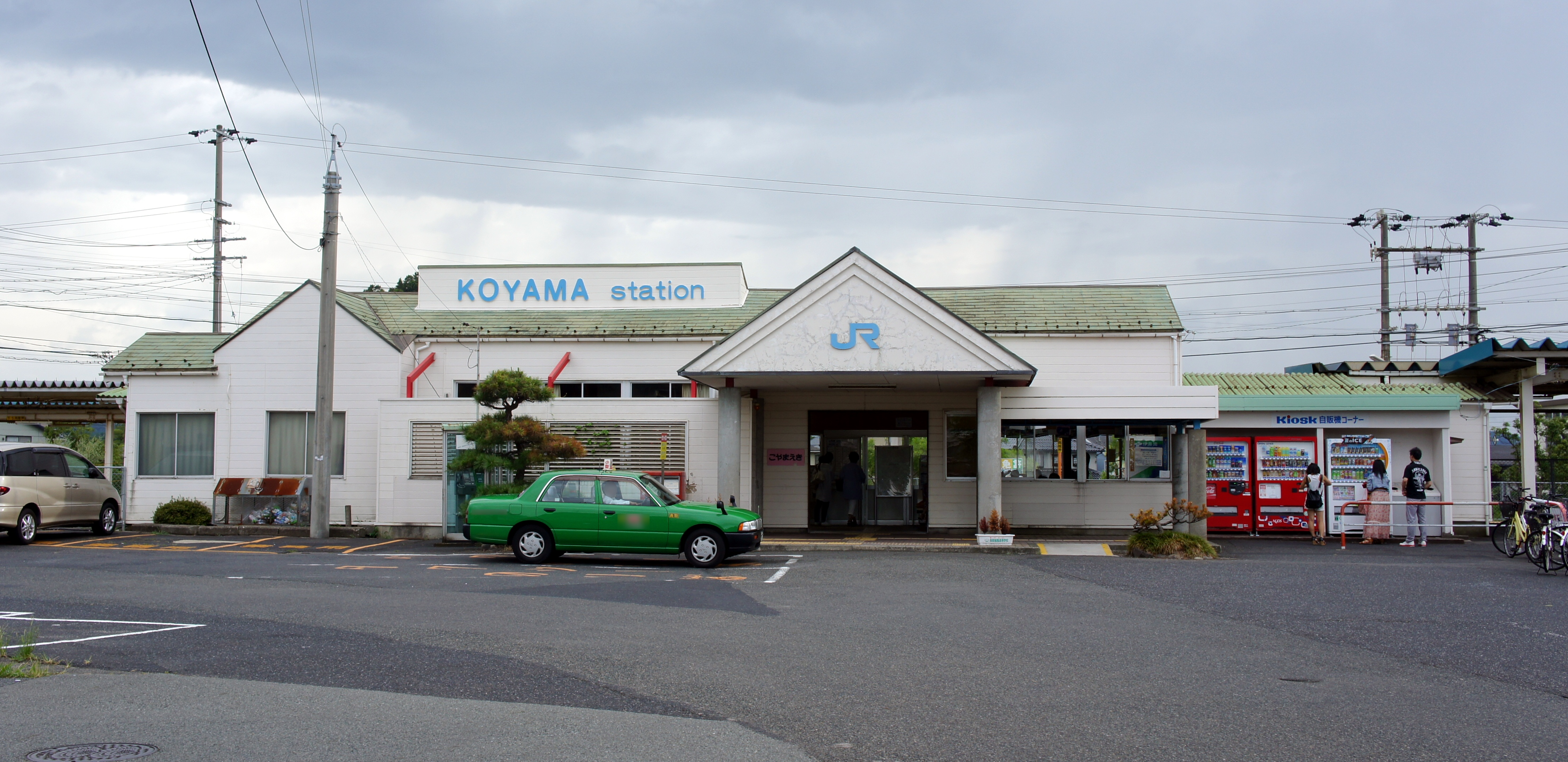
- Koyama Station building, August 2012

General information
- Location: 1-683 Higashi, Koyamacho, Tottori-shi, Tottori-ken 680-0942; Japan
- Coordinates: 35°30′49.33″N 134°11′9.93″E
- Operator: JR West
- Line: San'in Main Line
- Distance: 234.5 km (145.7 miles) from Kyoto
- Platforms: 2 side platforms
- Tracks: 2

Construction
- Structure type: At grade

Other information
- Status: Unstaffed
- Website: Official website

History
- Opened: 28 April 1907

Passengers
- 2020: 551 daily

Services
Preceding station	JR West	Following station
Tottoridaigakumae towards Shimonoseki	San'in Main Line A	Tottori towards Masuda
Location
- Location within Tottori Prefecture Location within Japan

Koyama Station (湖山駅, Koyama-eki) is a passenger railway station located in the city of Tottori, Tottori Prefecture, Japan. It is operated by the West Japan Railway Company (JR West).

== Lines ==
Koyama Station is served by the San'in Main Line, and is located 234.5 kilometers from the terminus of the line at Kyoto.

== Station layout ==
The station consists of two ground-level opposed side platforms connected by a footbridge to the station building. The station is unattended.

=== Platforms ===
1	■ San'in Main Line	for Hamasaka and Tottori
2	■ San'in Main Line	for Kurayoshi and Yonago

== Adjacent stations ==
West Japan Railway Company (JR West)

«	Service	»
Sanin Main Line
Limited Express Super Oki: Does not stop at this station
Limited Express Super Matsukaze: Does not stop at this station
Tottori	Express "Tottori Liner"	Tottoridaigakumae
Tottori	Local	Tottoridaigakumae

== History ==
Koyama Station opened on April 28, 1907. With the privatization of the Japan National Railways (JNR) on April 1, 1987, the station came under the aegis of the West Japan Railway Company.

== Passenger statistics ==
In fiscal 2020, the station was used by an average of 551 passengers daily.

== See also ==
- List of railway stations in Japan
