= Shikano Castle =

- 鹿野城
- Tottori, Tottori Prefecture, Japan
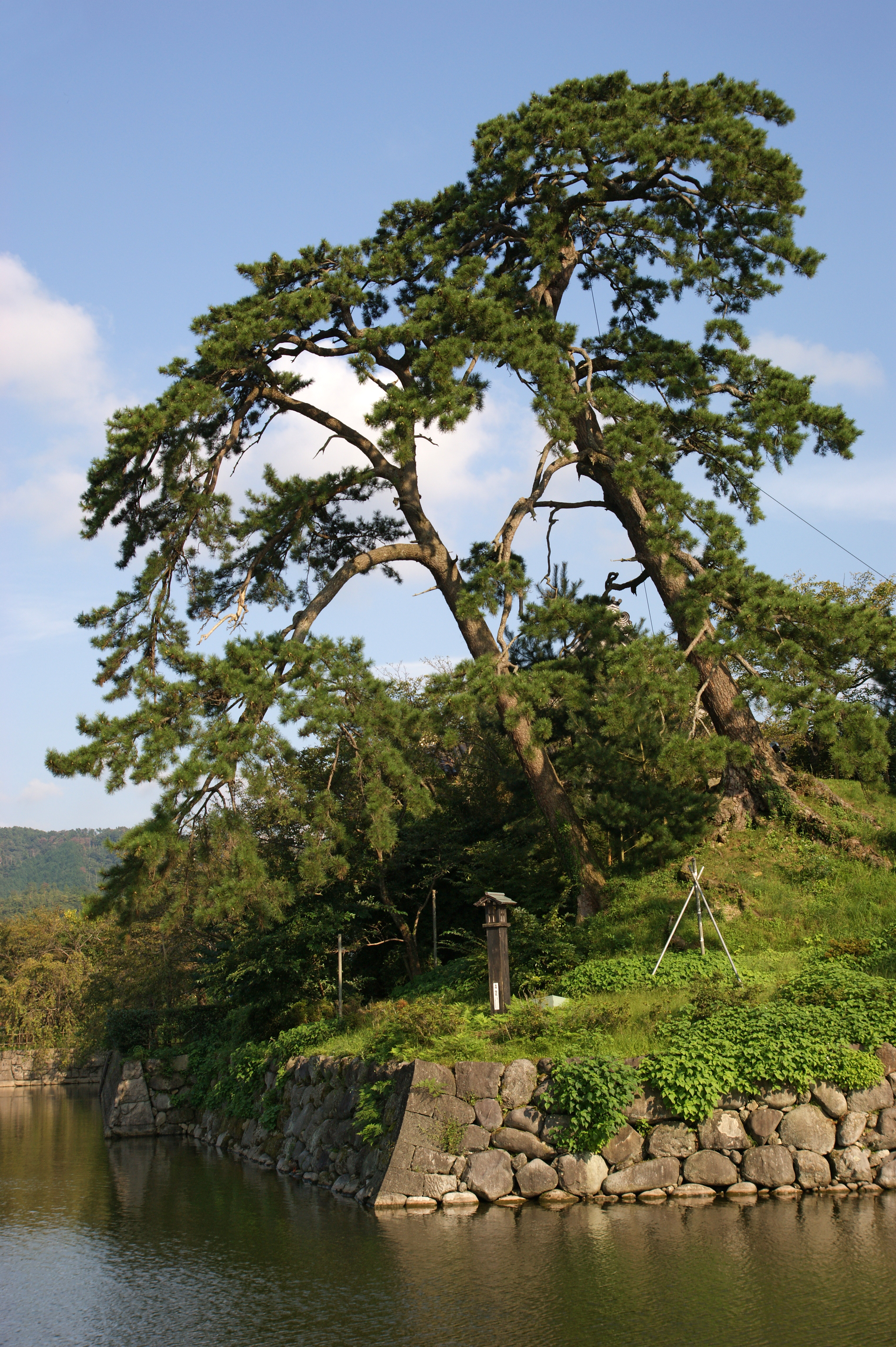
- Remnant of moat and walls of Shikano Castle

Site information
- Type: hirayama-style Japanese castle
- Open to the public: yes
- Condition: ruins

Location
- Shikano Castle Shikano Castle (Japan)
- Coordinates: 35°27′31.25″N 134°3′49.94″E

Site history
- In use: Sengoku period
- Demolished: 1627

Shikano Castle (鹿野城, Shikano jō) was a Muromachi period Japanese castle located in the Shikano neighborhood of the city of Tottori, Tottori Prefecture, in the San'in region of western Japan.

== History ==
Shikano Castle is located southwest of central Tottori city. It commands a junction of roads leading to the Sea of Japan and western Inaba Province with the Kurayoshi region of Hōki Province. This area was controlled by the local Shikano clan, who fortified this site at some unknown date in the early Muromachi period. The Shikano were conquered by the Amago clan of Izumo Province in 1544, which is the first the name of the castle appears in historical documentation. The Amago awarded it to their retainer, Kamei Korenori (1557–1612), who held it until the defeat of the Amago by the Mōri clan in 1566. Kamei escaped the fall of the castle to continue to fight against the Mōri, eventually joining with Toyotomi Hideyoshi. After Hideyoshi captured Inaba Province from the Mōri, he restored Shikano Castle to him. After Hideyoshi's death, Kamei Korenori pledged fealty to Tokugawa Ieyasu, and was confirmed in his holdings after the Battle of Sekigahara. Unusually for small warlords, Kamei received red seal authorization from the Tokugawa shogunate to conduct foreign trade, and constructed a vessel with the intent to trade with Siam, but the venture was not successful. His interest in foreign matters extended to Shikano Castle, which he renamed 王舎城 (Ousha-jō) after the city of Rajgir in India. He also named two of the yagura turrets of the castle the "Holland Yagura" and the "Korea yagura" and planted exotic trees in his gardens.

On his death, the Kamei clan was transferred to Tsuwano Domain and Shikano Castle was turned over to the Ikeda clan of Tottori Domain. The hilltop fortifications were demolished under the shogunate's policy of limiting the number of castles per domain.

== Current situation ==
On the current site, only fragments of walls and steps remain and portions of the moat remain. The site is a park.

== Gallery ==
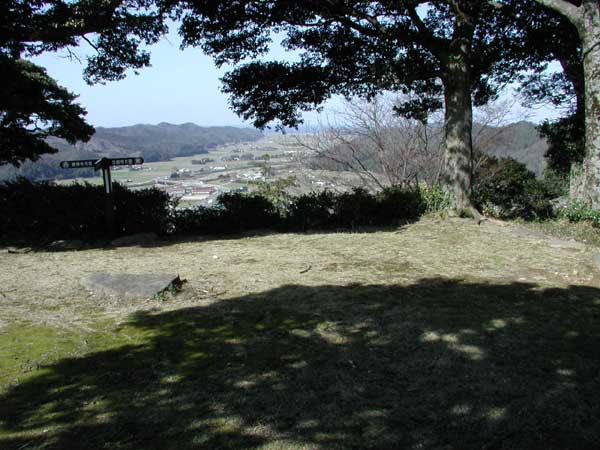
Site of the tenshu

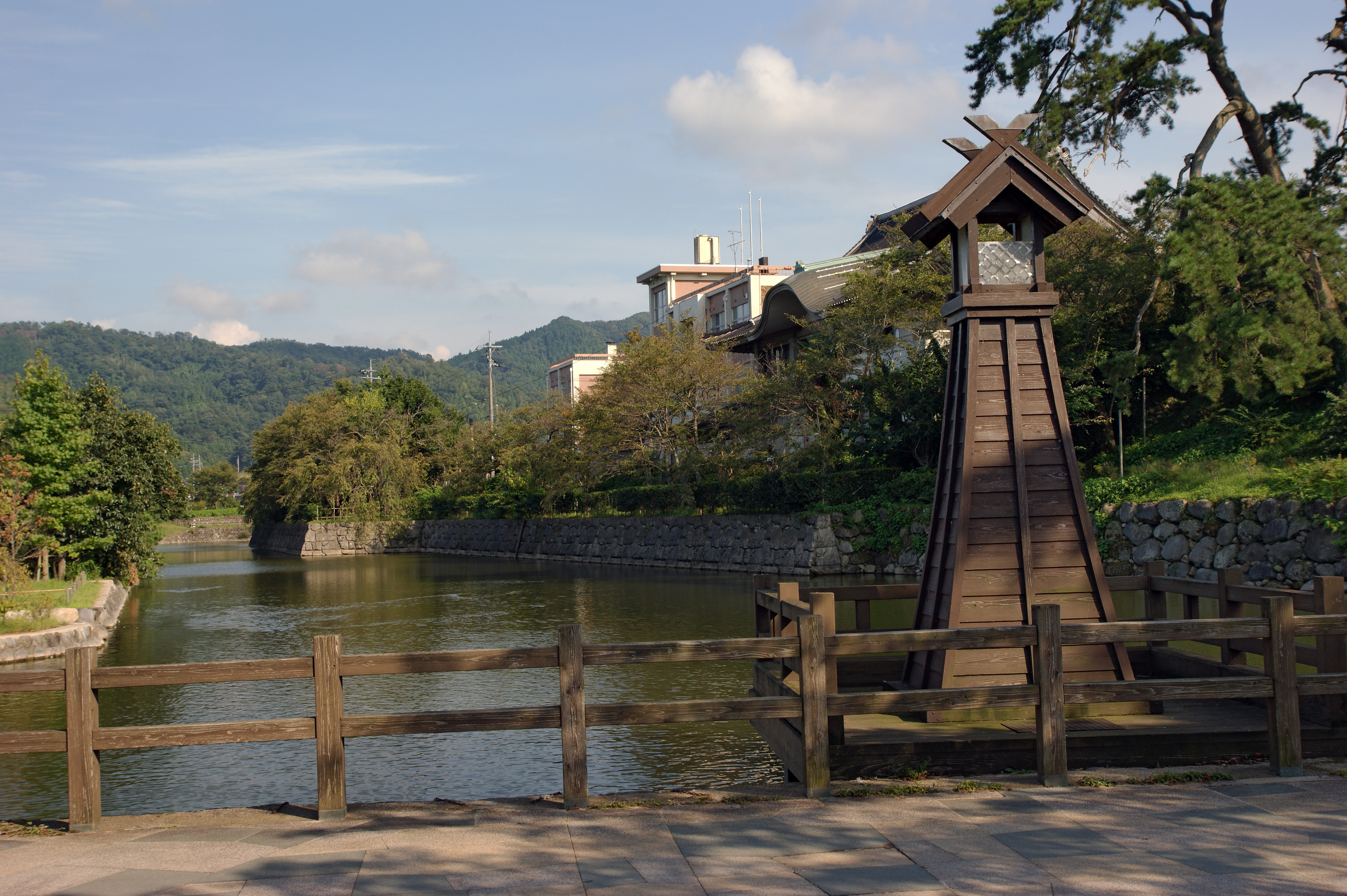
moat

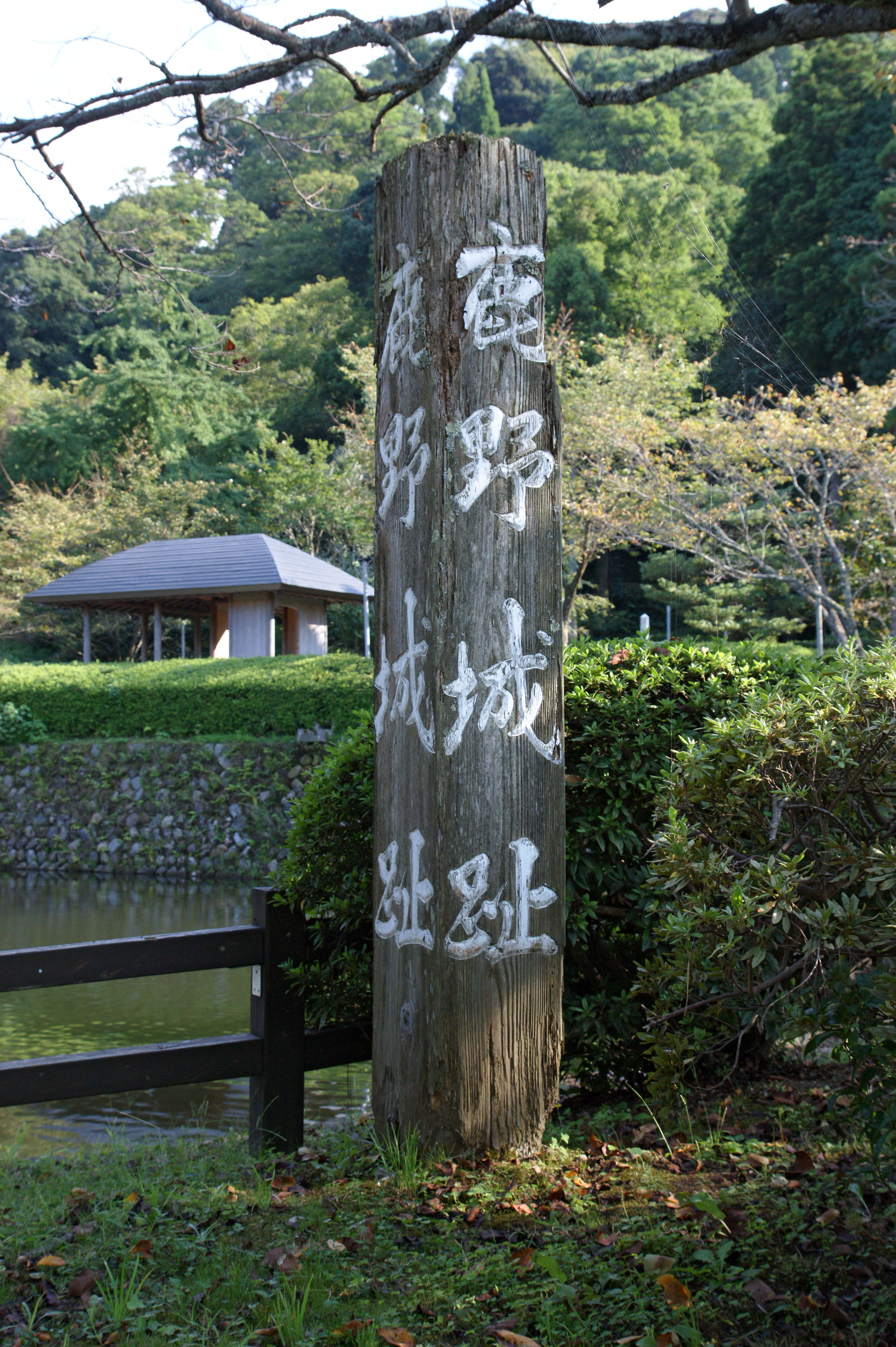
Signpost

== Literature ==
- De Lange, William (2021). An Encyclopedia of Japanese Castles. Groningen: Toyo Press. pp. 600 pages. ISBN 978-9492722300.
- Schmorleitz, Morton S. (1974). Castles in Japan. Tokyo: Charles E. Tuttle Co. pp. 144–145. ISBN 0-8048-1102-4.
- Motoo, Hinago (1986). Japanese Castles. Tokyo: Kodansha. p. 200 pages. ISBN 0-87011-766-1.
- Mitchelhill, Jennifer (2004). Castles of the Samurai: Power and Beauty. Tokyo: Kodansha. p. 112 pages. ISBN 4-7700-2954-3.
- Turnbull, Stephen (2003). Japanese Castles 1540-1640. Osprey Publishing. p. 64 pages. ISBN 1-84176-429-9.
