= Shan-shan festival =

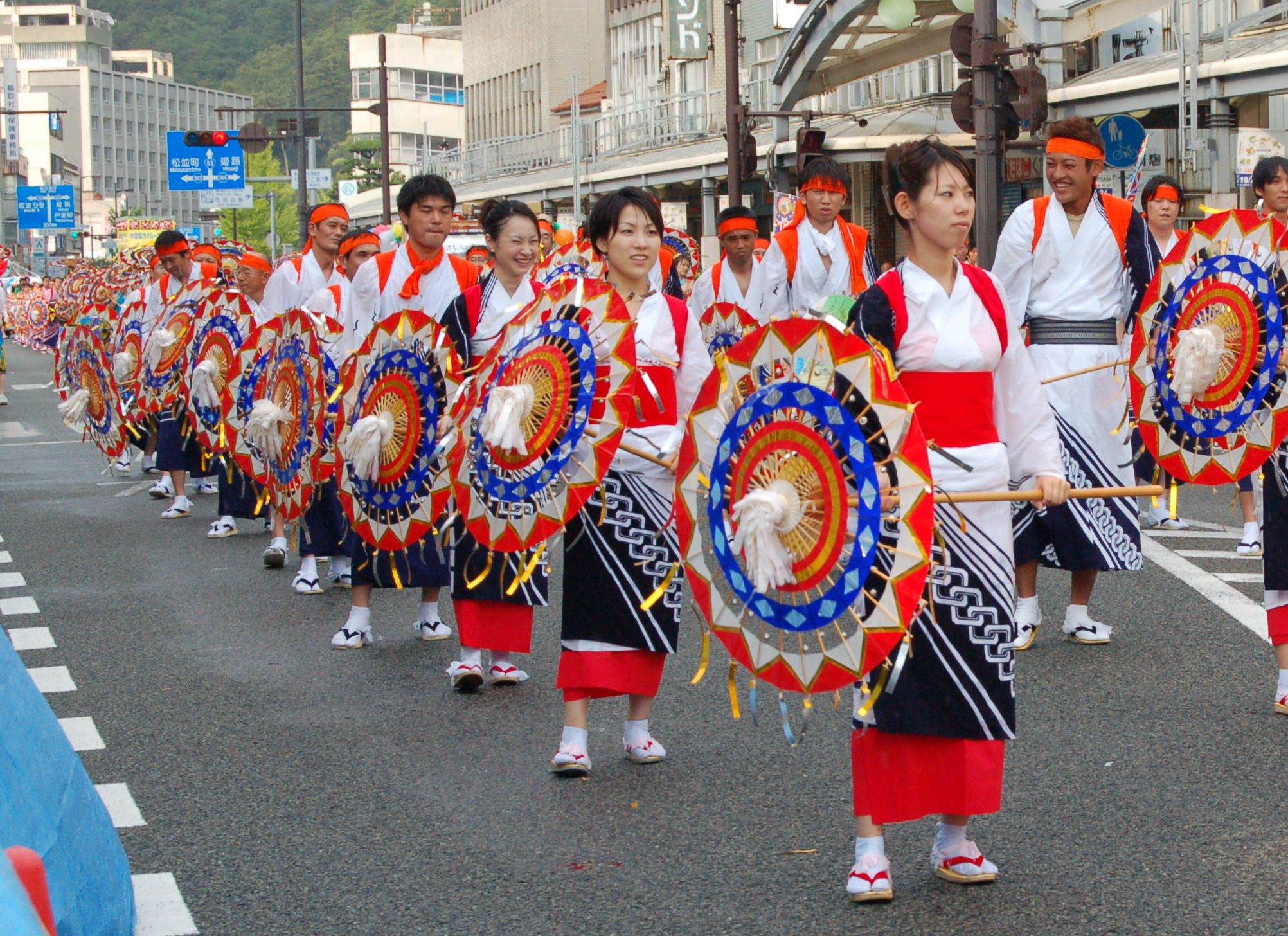
Umbrella dance

The Bon-odori, a Japanese dance which is part of the Obon Festival, is widely enjoyed by the people in Tottori during the summer. There are various bon-dances throughout Japan, and the dances in Tottori can be categorized as Kasa-odori (a dance with a paper umbrellas) and te-odori (hand dance).

== Tottori City's Shan Shan Festival (Kasa-odori) ==
The Kasa-odori is very popular in the eastern part of Tottori Prefecture. According to a legend in Kokufu, in the Edo period (1603–1867) during a drought, an old man named Gorosaku danced with an umbrella for the village god praying for rain. Gorosaku danced with the umbrella until he died, and the drought ended. These days, the dance is performed with ornamented paper umbrellas and Japanese swords, which represent the beautiful but gallant local culture of Tottori.
