= Tottori Sand Museum =

- 砂の美術館
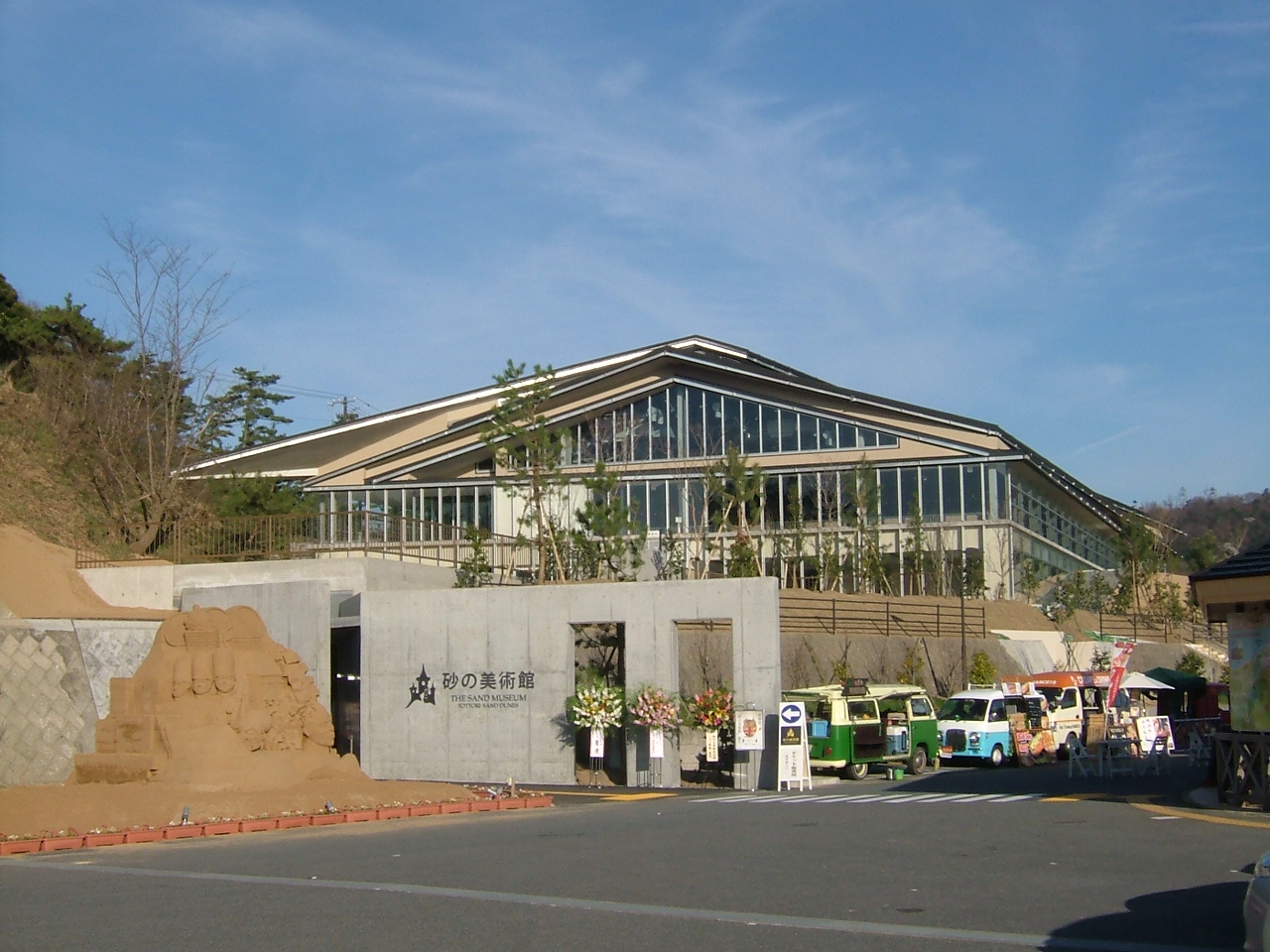
- Interactive map of the Tottori Sand Museum area

General information
- Location: 2083-17, Yuyama, Fukube-chō, Tottori, Tottori Prefecture, Japan
- Coordinates: 35°32′23″N 134°14′17″E
- Opened: 14 April 2012
- Cost: ¥ 580 million

Website
- www.sand-museum.jp/en

The Tottori Sand Museum (砂の美術館, Suna no Bijutsukan) was opened on November 18, 2006, in Tottori, Japan, close to the Tottori Sand Dunes, displaying sand sculptures in temporary facilities. On April 14, 2012, it reopened as the world's first permanent indoor exhibition space dedicated to sand art, exhibiting works by fifteen international sculptors.

== History ==
The local tourism officer of the Tottori Sand Dunes, Shinji Tsutsui, was passionate about the Italian Renaissance, and invited the sand sculptor Katsuhiko Chaen to create a sand exhibit on that theme in 2006.

The first exhibit took place in November 2006. The first exhibits took place in a tent. In 2012, a permanent 21,000-square building, located around 20 minutes from the sand dunes, became the home of the exhibit.

The museum won the 2021 TripAdvisor's choice award for places to visit.

== Description ==
Each yearly exhibit starts in April and lasts until January of the following year. The sand sculptures are then deliberately destroyed and a new exhibit is prepared from January to April. The sand sculptor Katsuhiko Chaen is the chief sculptor. Despite the museum's close proximity to the sand dunes, that sand cannot be used because the sand dunes are part of a protected national park. The sand comes from a road building project, and the same sand is reused each year. Only sand and water is used to create the sculptures. The museum's motto is "Travel around the World in Sand", and the exhibit is themed around a different country or geographical area each year.

== Yearly exhibits ==
Year	Theme	Description
2006	Italian Renaissance	
2007	World Heritage and Asia|	
2008	Austria	
2009	Africa	
2010	No exhibition	Construction of indoor exhibition space
2011	No exhibition	Construction of indoor exhibition space
2012	United Kingdom	Olympics- and London-themed sand sculpture to celebrate the 2012 Summer Olympics.
2013	South-East Asia	
2014	Russia	
2015	Germany	
2016	South America	
2017	U.S.A.	
2018	Northern Europe	
2019	South Asia	
2020	Czech Republic and Slovakia	100th anniversary of the establishment of diplomatic relations between Japan and Czechoslovakia. 3,000 tons of sand were used by 17 sculptors.
2021	No exhibition	COVID-19
2022	Egypt	
2023	Egypt	Continuation of previous year's exhibit
2024	France	
2025	Japan	

== See also ==
- Sand art
