= Tottori University =

University in Japan

Coordinates: 35°30′54″N 134°10′18″E

National University Corporation Tottori University
- 鳥取大学
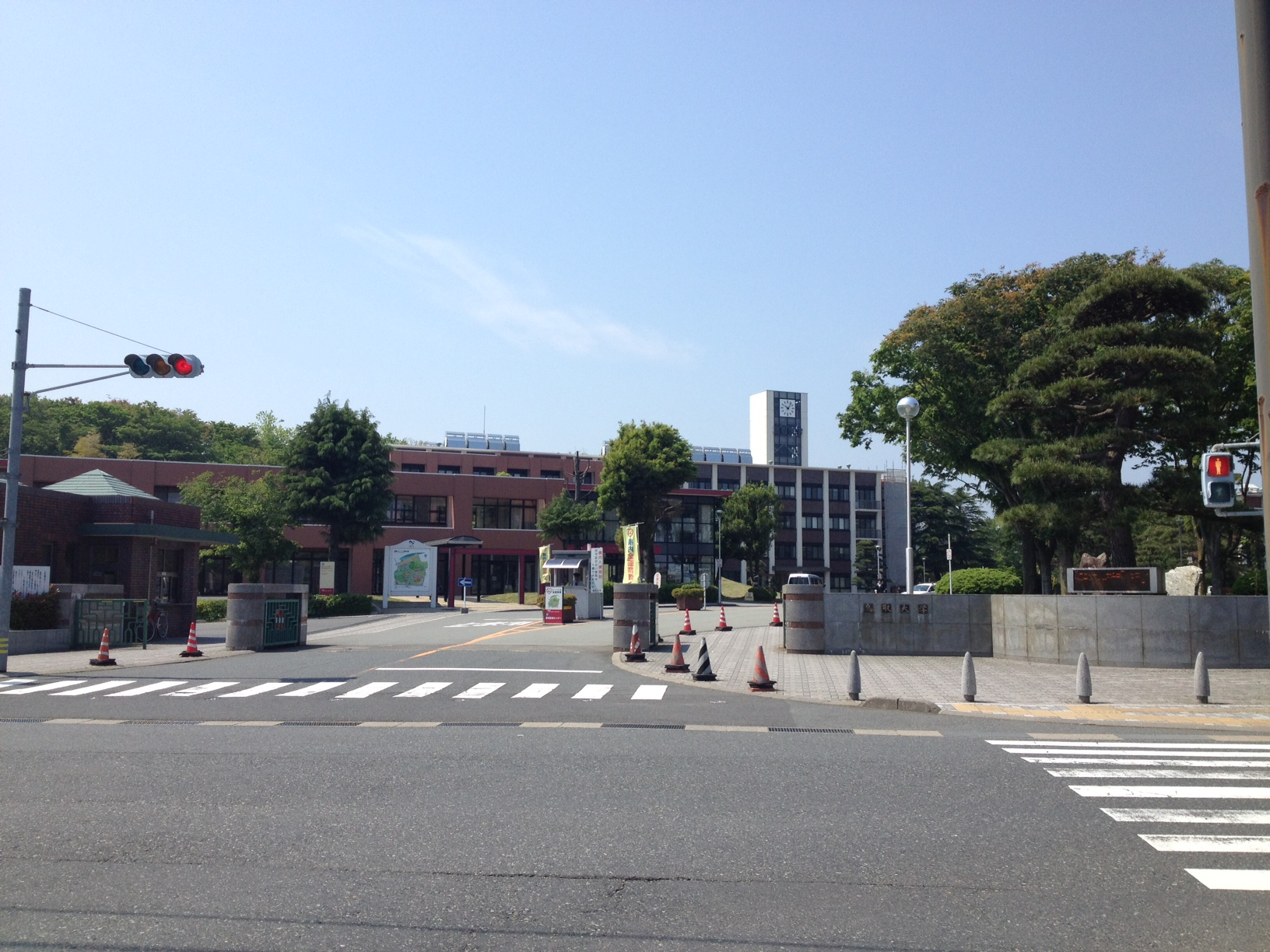
- Tottori Campus
- Motto: 知と実践の融合 (Fusion of Knowledge and Practice)
- Type: Public (National)
- Established: 1949
- President: Ryota Teshima
- Faculty: 1,366
- Students: 6,148
- Undergraduates: 5,268
- Postgraduates: 1,085
- Doctoral students: 397
- Location: 4-101 Koyama-cho Minami, Tottori, 680-8550, Japan, Tottori, Tottori
- Campus: Tottori, Yonago
- Website: Tottori University

National University Corporation Tottori University (国立大学法人鳥取大学, Tottori Daigaku), abbreviated to Toridai (鳥大), is a national university in Japan. The main campus is located in Koyamachō-Minami, Tottori City, Tottori Prefecture. Another campus, the Faculty of Medicine, is located on the Yonago Campus in Yonago, Tottori.

== History ==
Tottori University (TU) was established in 1949 by integrating five national colleges in Tottori Prefecture:

1. Yonago Medical College (米子医科大学, Yonago Ika daigaku), established in 1948,
2. Yonago Professional School of Medicine (米子医学専門学校, Yonago Igaku Senmon Gakkō), founded in 1945,
3. Tottori College of Agriculture and Forestry (鳥取農林専門学校, Tottori Nōrin Senmon Gakkō), founded in 1920 as Tottori Agricultural College,
4. Tottori Normal School (鳥取師範学校, Tottori Shihan Gakkō), founded in 1874, also known as the Tottori Teachers Training Institute,
5. Tottori Youth Normal School (鳥取青年師範学校, Tottori seinen shihan gakkō; founded in 1921)

The university at first had three faculties: the Faculties of Liberal Arts (in Tachikawa-cho Campus), Medicine (in Yonago Campus) and Agriculture (in Yoshikata Campus). The latter history of the university is as follows:

- 1965: the Faculty of Engineering was established (in Tachikawa-cho Campus).
- 1966: the Faculty of Liberal Arts was renamed Faculty of Education.
  - In August 1966 the Faculties of Education, Engineering and Agriculture were removed to the new-born Koyama Campus, which is now the main Tottori Campus.
  - The former Tachikawa-cho and Yoshikata Campuses are now used as Sanyo and Epson factories.
- 1999: the Faculty of Education was reorganized into Faculty of Education and Regional Sciences.
- 2004: the Faculty of Education and Regional Sciences was reorganized into Faculty of Regional Sciences.

== Organization ==
=== Faculties (undergraduate schools) ===
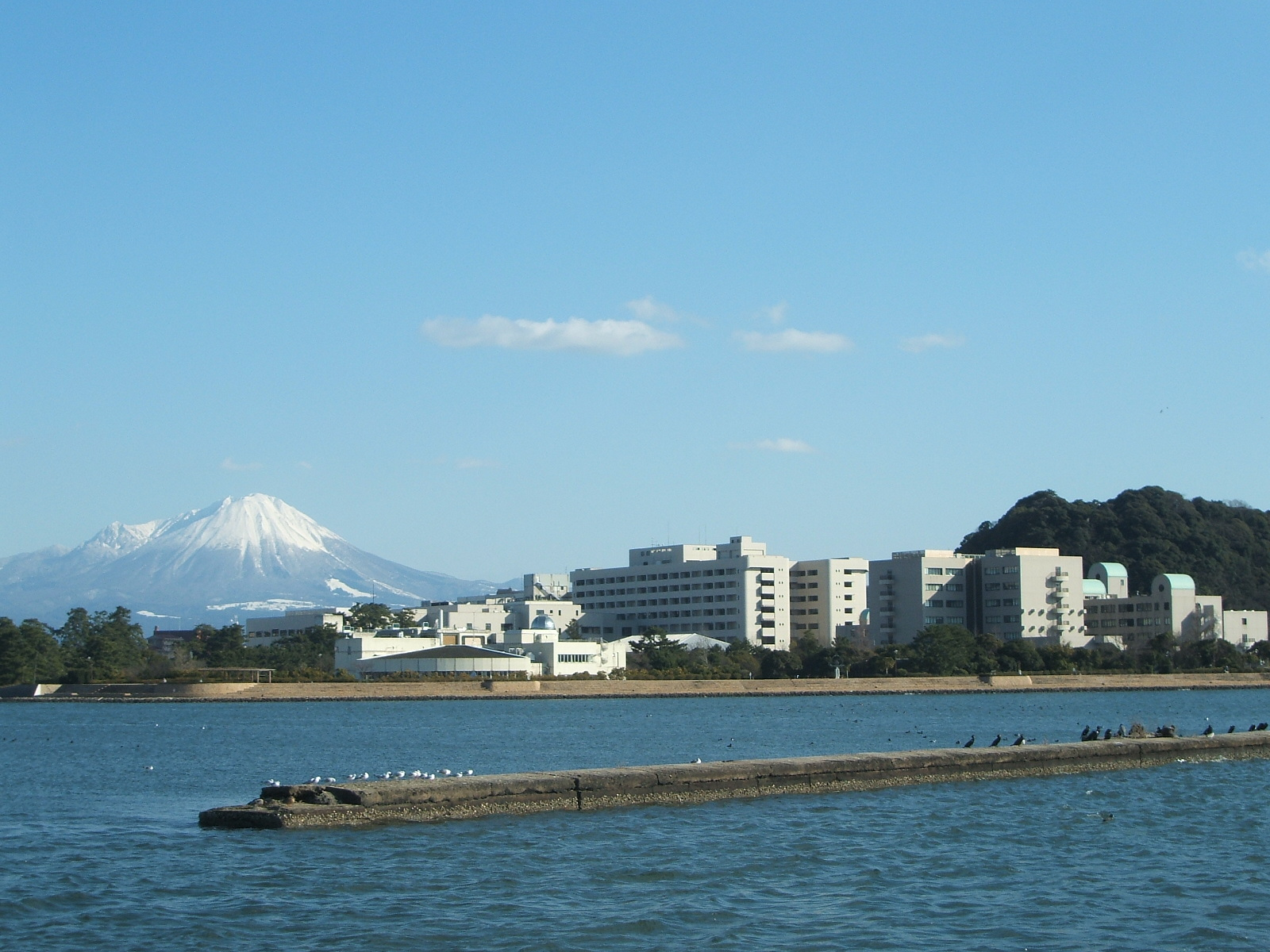
Yonago Campus

- Faculty of Regional Sciences
- Faculty of Medicine (in Yonago Campus)
- Faculty of Engineering
- Faculty of Agriculture

=== Graduate schools ===
- Graduate School of Regional Sciences (Master's courses only)
- Graduate School of Medical Sciences (Yonago Campus)
- Graduate School of Engineering
- Graduate School of Agriculture (Master's courses only)
- United Graduate School of Agricultural Science (Doctoral courses only)
  - Participants are Tottori, Shimane and Yamaguchi Universities.
- United Graduate School of Veterinary Medicine (Doctoral courses only)
  - Participants are Yamaguchi, Tottori, Miyazaki and Kagoshima Universities.

=== Facilities ===
- Tottori University Library

=== Institutes and related facilities ===
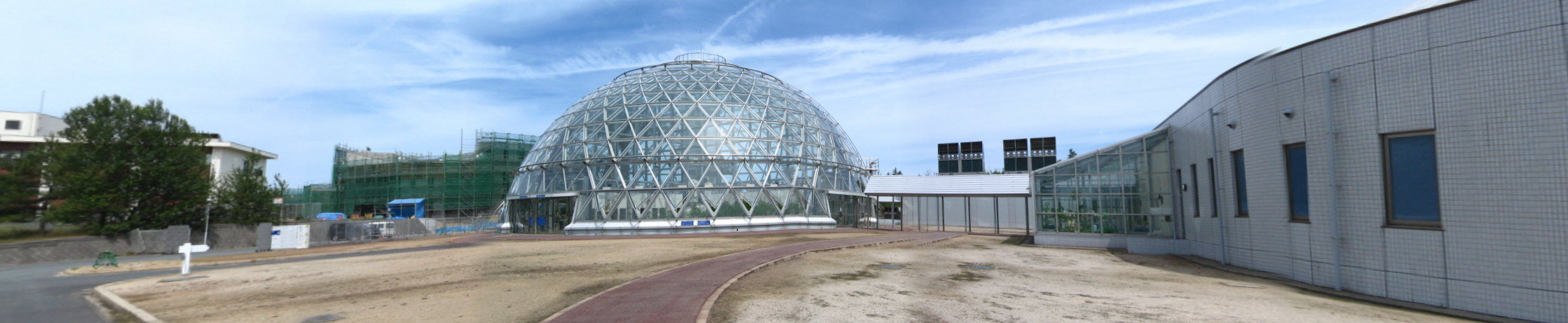
Arid Land Research Center in Tottori Sand Dunes

- The Tottori University Arid Land Research Center (乾燥地研究センター, Tottori Daigaku Kansōchi Kenkyū Sentā) dates to 1923. As Tottori College of Agriculture and Forestry was located near the Tottori Sand Dunes, its main task included the study of agriculture on dry or sandy land. In 1923 it opened a test field by the sand dunes. The tradition is followed by the TU Faculty of Agriculture and the research center.
- The university's Geospheric Structure and Dynamics Laboratory is represented on the national Coordinating Committee for Earthquake Prediction.
- Tottori University Hospital (鳥取大学医学部付属病院, Tottori Daigaku Igakubu Fuzoku Byōin), Yonago Campus

=== General rankings ===
Tottori university ranked 30th of Japan's top 300 universities in 2014 in the ranking "Truly Strong Universities" by Toyo Keizai. In another ranking, the university ranked 44th in Japan in the ranking by University Ranking by Academic Performance among 730 universities in 2013–2014.
