= Tottori (city) =

Tottori 鳥取市
- Prefecture capital and Core city
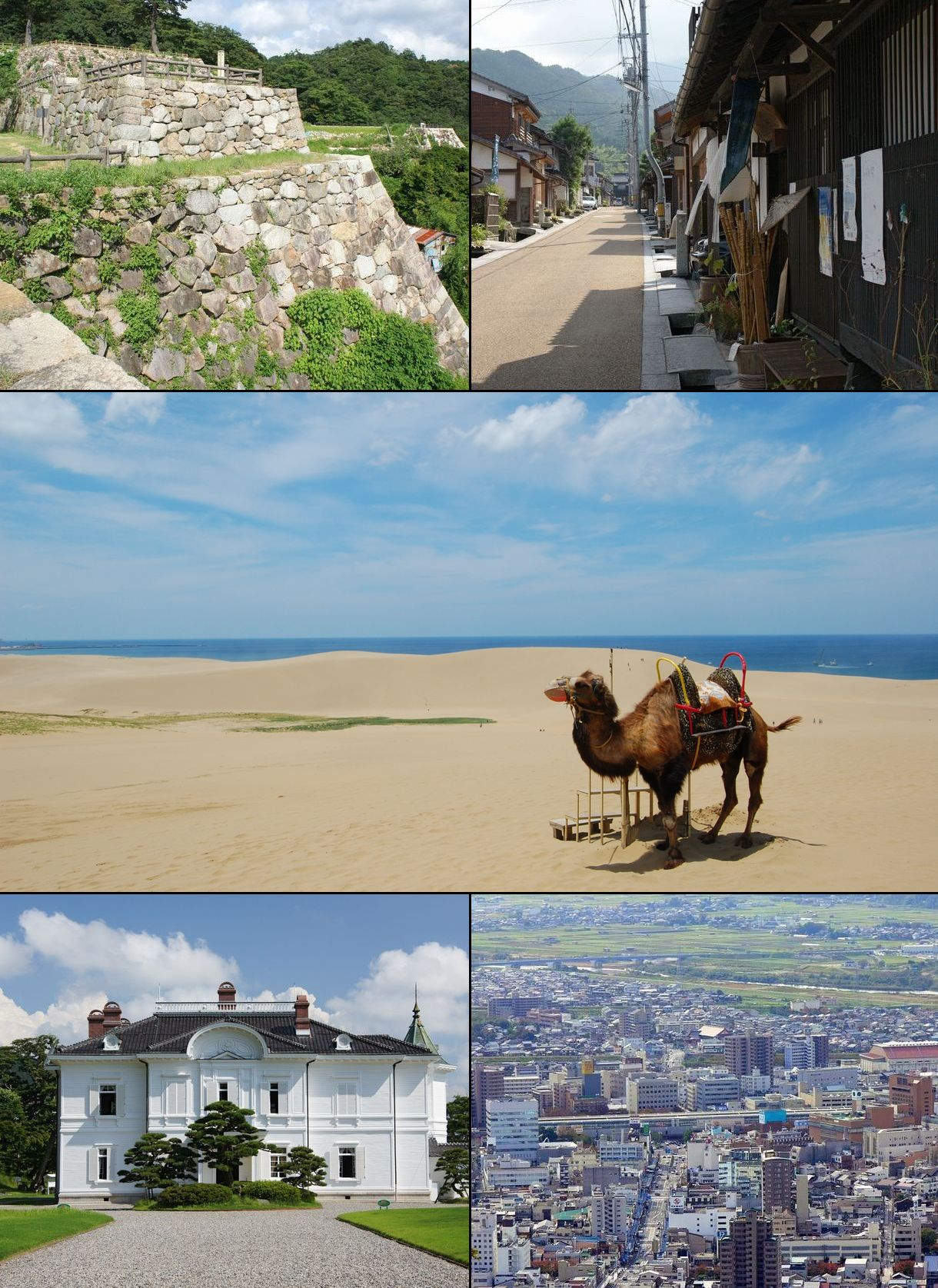
- From top left: Tottori Castle, Shikano (old castle town), Tottori Sand Dunes, Jinpūkaku, View of Tottori from Tottori Castle

- Flag Seal
- Location of Tottori in Tottori Prefecture

- Location in Japan
- Coordinates: 35°30′N 134°14′E
- Country: Japan
- Region: Chūgoku (Sanin)
- Prefecture: Tottori

Government
  - Mayor: Yoshihiko Fukazawa

Area
  - Total: 765.31 km^{2} (295.49 sq mi)

Population (November 30, 2022)
  - Total: 183,383
  - Density: 239.62/km^{2} (620.61/sq mi)
- Time zone: UTC+09:00 (JST)
- City hall address: 116 Shutoku-cho, Tottori-shi, Tottori-ken 680-8571
- Climate: Cfa
- Website: Official website
- Symbols
- Bird: Blue-and-white flycatcher
- Flower: Allium chinense
- Tree: Camellia sasanqua

Tottori (鳥取市, Tottori-shi; Japanese pronunciation: [tò̞t̚.tó̞.ɾʲí(.ɕì)]) is the capital and the largest city of Tottori Prefecture in the Chūgoku region of Japan. As of 30 November 2022, the city had an estimated population of 183,383 in 81,732 households and a population density of 240 persons per km^{2}. The total area of the city is 765.31 square kilometres (295.49 sq mi). Most of the city is within the San'in Kaigan Geopark.

== Geography ==
The city of Tottori is located in the east of the prefecture at the foot of the Chūgoku Mountains at the mouth of the Sendai River. While it is about 300 km by road to Hiroshima city, which is the regional hub of the Chūgoku region, it is only 180 km from Kobe, 190 km from Osaka, and 220 km from Kyoto. Within Japan the city is best known for the Tottori Sand Dunes which are a popular tourist attraction, drawing visitors from outside the prefecture. The sand dunes are also important as a centre for research into arid agriculture, hosting Tottori University's Arid Land Research Center.

=== Neighboring municipalities ===
Hyōgo Prefecture

- Shin'onsen

Okayama Prefecture

- Kagamino
- Tsuyama

Tottori Prefecture

- Chizu
- Iwami
- Misasa
- Wakasa
- Yazu
- Yurihama

== Demographics ==
Per Japanese census data, the population of Tottori is as follows. Tottori has the lowest population among prefectural capitals in Japan.

Historical population
Year	Pop.	±%
1920	130,050	—
1930	136,874	+5.2%
1940	137,637	+0.6%
1950	168,463	+22.4%
1960	170,731	+1.3%
1970	169,176	−0.9%
1980	184,601	+9.1%
1990	195,707	+6.0%
2000	200,744	+2.6%
2010	197,391	−1.7%

== History ==
Tottori is part of ancient Inaba Province, and the place name "Tottori" can be found in the early Heian period Wamyō Ruijushō. Tottori Castle was completed in 1545 and the surrounding castle town forms the core of the modern city. During the Edo period, Tottori was the seat of a branch of the Ikeda clan, which ruled Tottori Domain. Following the Meiji restoration, Tottori was incorporated as a city on October 1, 1889, with the implementation of the modern municipalities system.

Most of the downtown area was destroyed by the Tottori earthquake of September 10, 1943, which killed over 1000 people, and much of the rebuilt city was destroyed again in the Great Tottori Fire of April 17, 1952.

In the 1950s, and again in 2004, redistricting ("gappei") of the city's borders increased its size to include a number of surrounding areas.

On November 1, 2004, the then-Tottori Mayor Isao Takeuchi oversaw the merger of the city of Tottori with six surrounding towns and two villages, forming its modern municipal borders. The town of Kokufu, the village of Fukube (both from Iwami District), the towns of Aoya, Ketaka and Shikano (all from Ketaka District), the towns of Kawahara and Mochigase and the village of Saji (all from Yazu District) were merged into Tottori. Ketaka District was dissolved as a result of this merger.

Tottori gained special city status on October 1, 2005, with an increased local autonomy. The 2016 Tottori earthquake caused moderate damage and several injuries, but no fatalities.

== Government ==
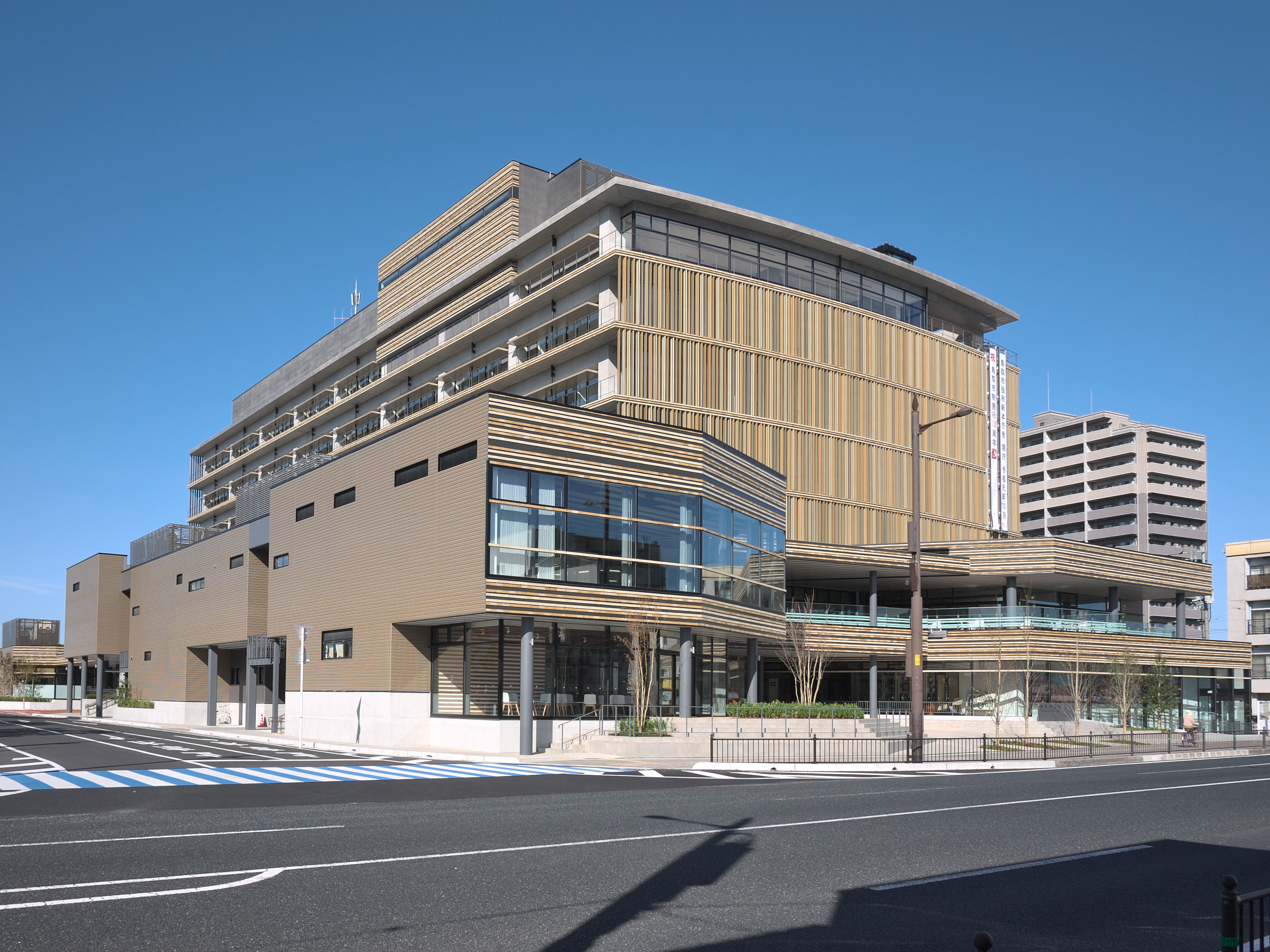
Tottori City Hall

Tottori has a mayor-council form of government with a directly elected mayor and a unicameral city council of 32 members. Tottori contributes 12 members to the Tottori Prefectural Assembly. In terms of national politics, the city is part of Tottori 1st district of the lower house of the Diet of Japan.

== Economy ==
As the administrative center of Tottori Prefecture, the city of Tottori is the regional center for commerce. Agricultural products include rice and Tottori is also famous for its production of scallions.

== Education ==
=== Universities and colleges ===
Tottori City has two universities. The main campus of Tottori University, a national public university, is located next to Koyama Lake on the west end of the city. The privately funded Tottori University of Environmental Studies is located in the south-eastern part of Tottori city, near the town of Yazu. These two universities are not to be confused with the 2-year junior college in the prefecture, Tottori College, which is located in the central city of Kurayoshi.

=== Primary and secondary education ===
Tottori has 39 public elementary schools operated by the city government, and one by the national government. It has 13 public middle schools operated by the city government, one by the national government and one private middle school. The city has seven public high schools operated by the Tottori Prefectural Board of Education, and four private high schools. The prefecture also operates four special education schools for the handicapped and there is one more special education school operated by the national government.

== Transportation ==
=== Airports ===
- Tottori Airport

=== Railway ===
JR West - Inbi Line

- Tottori - Tsunoi - <Higashi-Kōge - Kōge - Kawahara> - Kunifusa - Takagari - Mochigase - Inaba-Yashiro

JR West - San'in Main Line

- Aoya - Hamamura - Hōgi - Suetsune - Tottoridaigakumae - Koyama - Tottori - Fukube

=== Highways ===
- Tottori Expressway
- San'in Expressway
- San'in Kinki Expressway
- National Route 9
- National Route 29
- National Route 53
- National Route 373

== Sister cities ==
- Cheongju, North Chungcheong, South Korea
- Hanau, Hesse, Germany
- Himeji, Hyōgo, Japan, since March 8, 1972
- Iwakuni, Yamaguchi, Japan, since October 13, 1995
- Kushiro, Hokkaido, Japan, since October 4, 1963
- Shahe, Hebei, China, friendship city since 1995
- Taicang, Jiangsu, China, friendship city since 1995

== Local attractions ==
=== Outline ===
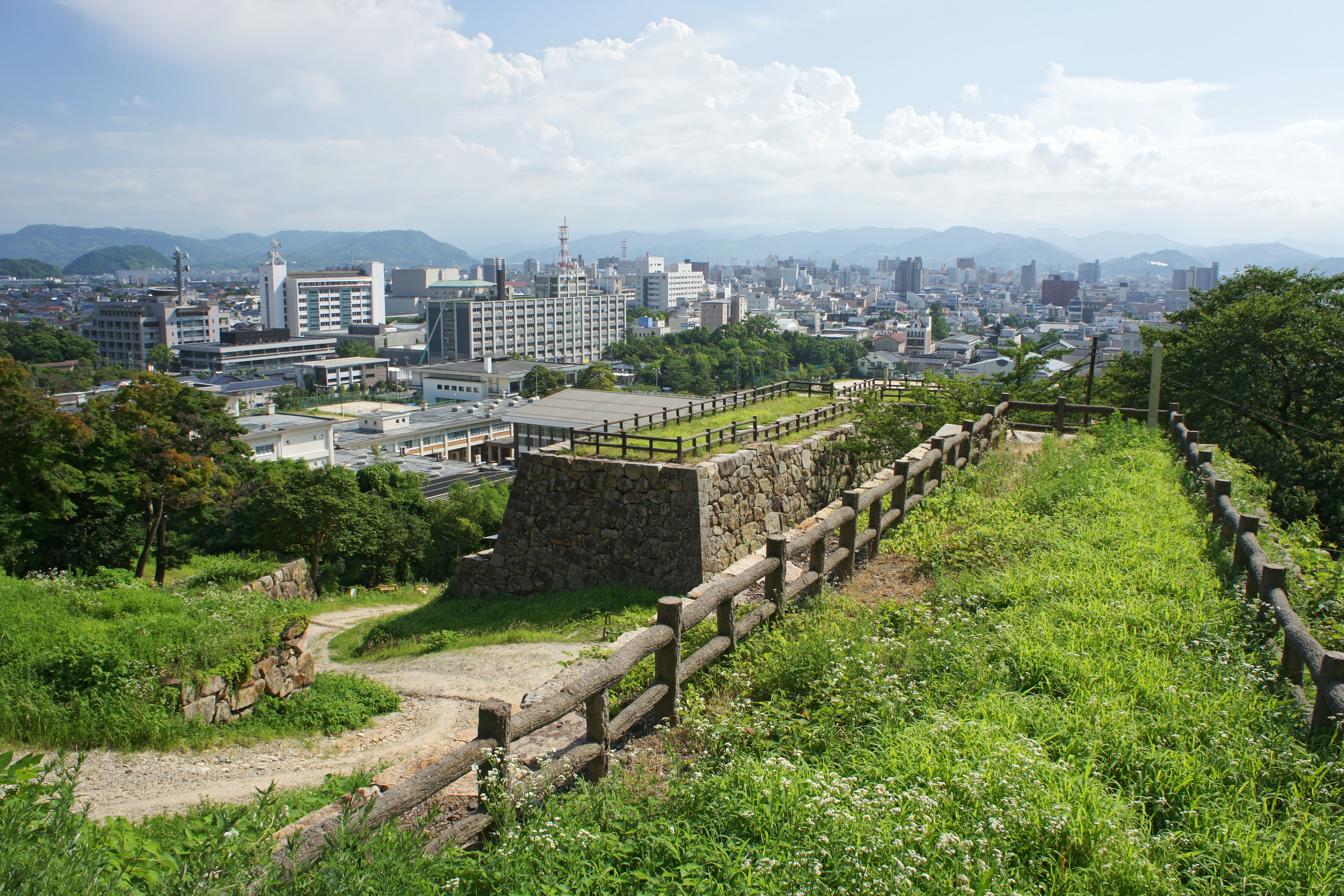
Skyline of Tottori City from Tottori Castle

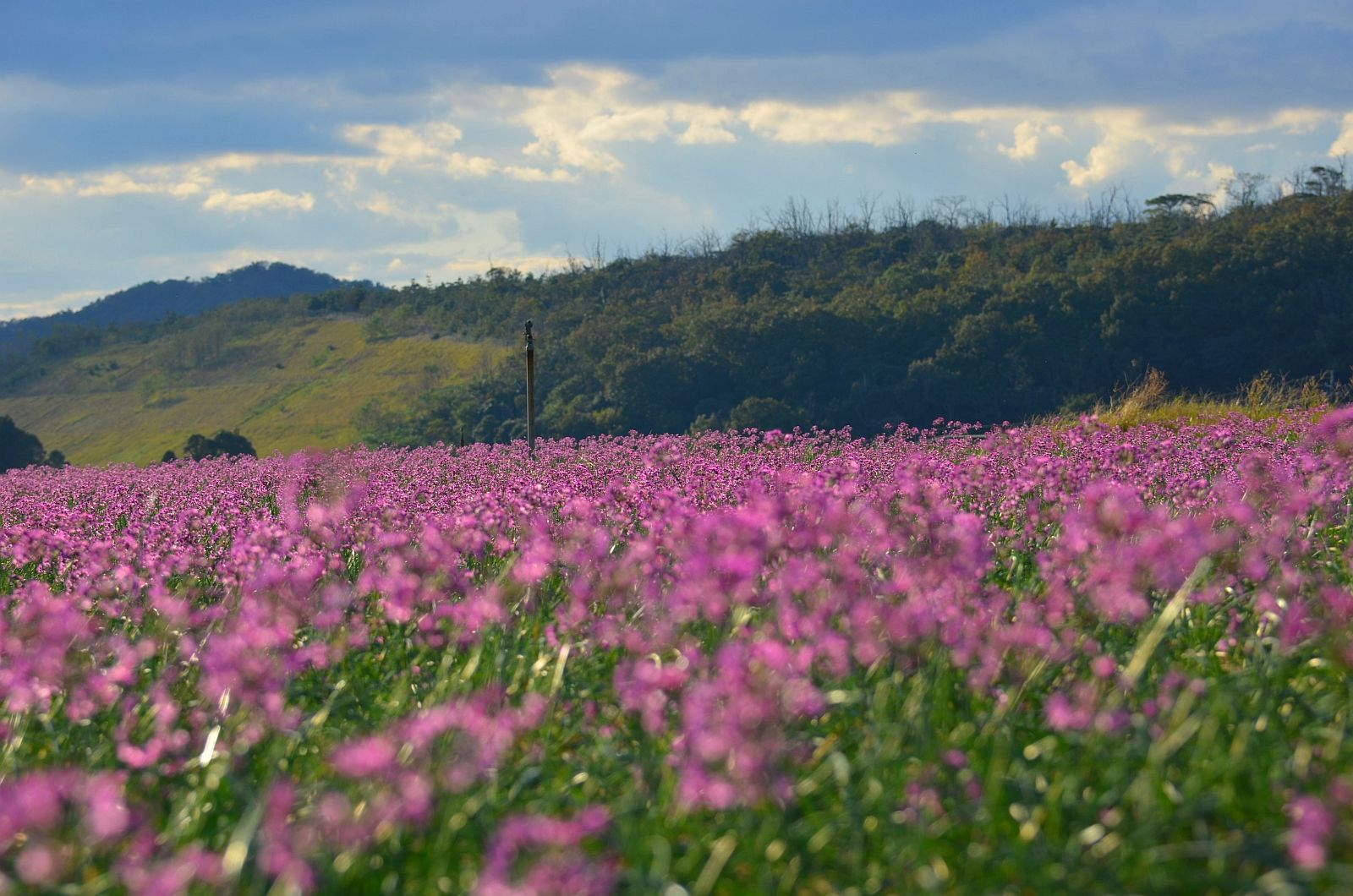
Allium chinense fields in Tottori

The city's main street (Wakasa, or "young cherry blossom" street) runs north from the station and terminates at the foot of the Kyushouzan ("eternal pine") mountain. Around this mountain lies the oldest part of the city. Its centre is the now ruined Tottori Castle, once the property of the Ikeda clan daimyō who ruled the Tottori Domain during the Edo period. It is open to the public, and is the site of the Castle Festival in autumn each year. In the vicinity are temples, museums, and public parks. The city also hosts the prefecturally famous Shan-shan festival in the summer, which features teams of people dressing up and dancing with large umbrellas; the name 'Shan-shan' is said to come from the sound made by the small bells and pieces of metal attached to the umbrellas, which are very large. An exceptionally big example of a Shan-shan umbrella graces the main foyer of Tottori Station.

At the beginning of every summer, Tottori is host to one of the biggest beach parties in the country, the San In Beach Party. The event lasts an entire weekend and some top names on the national DJ circuit are invited to perform.

== Museums ==
Tottori has a number of museums located in the main part of the city, and surrounding districts

=== Watanabe Art Museum ===
The Watanabe Art museum (渡辺美術館, Watanabe Bijutsukan) is the largest collection of armour and weapons in Japan. It is a mixture of historical art, modern art and historical artifacts. While the initial part of the collection is art focussed the main body of the museums is devoted to a large number of swords, yumi, other weapons and samurai armour. There is also a wide range of historical artifacts, many found in archaeological digs in the Tottori area.

It was established in 1978 in order to display and make available the collection, which numbers over 30,000 items, including over 200 sets of armour.

=== Gosho Aoyama Manga Factory - Conan Museum ===
The museum is dedicated to the high-profile Detective Conan manga, which is a manga story originating from Tottori. The museum is devoted to the detective Conan story near Yura, near Tottori. The museum shows items from the artist, and has original drafts of the manga.

=== Tottori City Historical Museum ===
The Tottori City Historical Museum (鳥取市歴史博物館, Tottori-shi Rekishi Hakubutsukan) opened in Tottori, Japan, in 2000 and is dedicated to the cities history.

=== Tottori Folk Crafts Museum ===
The Tottori Folk Crafts Museum opened in Tottori, Japan, in 1949. It was established as the Tottori Mingeikan by Yoshida Shōya (吉田璋也), local advocate of the mingei folk craft movement, who formed a craft guild in 1931 and opened the craft shop "Takumi" in the city the following year. In 1933, Yoshida opened a shop by the same name in Tokyo's Ginza district. Both shops are still in operation as of 2023.

=== Tottori Prefectural Museum ===
The Tottori Prefectural Museum (鳥取県立博物館, Tottori Kenritsu Hakubutsukan) is the prefectural museum of Tottori, Japan, dedicated to the nature, history, folklore, and art of the region. It holds over three thousand items from the permanent collection.

=== Tottori Sand Museum ===
An indoor exhibition centre dedicated to sand sculptures. The Museum regularly hosts guest artists who make sand sculptures for display. The yearly exhibits start in April and lasts until January of the following year. The sand sculptures are then deliberately removed to make space for new exhibits. The chief sculptor for the museums is Katsuhiko Chaen. The sand is sourced from a road building project.

== Sports facilities ==
- Axis Bird Stadium
- Yamata Sports Park Stadium

== Shrines and temples ==
- Kannon-in, whose Japanese garden is a Special Place of Scenic Beauty of Japan
- Kōzen-ji, family temple of the Ikeda Clan
- Mount Misumi
- Ōchidani Shrine
- Ube shrine, former ichinomiya of Inaba Province

== National Historic Sites ==
- Aoyakamiji Site
- Fuse Kofun
- Ifukibe-no-Tokotari grave
- Inaba Provincial Capital ruins
- Kajiyama Kofun
- Tochimoto temple ruins
- Tottori Castle
- Tottori Domain Ikeda clan cemetery

== Other attractions ==
- Jinpūkaku, French Renaissance-style residence of the Ikeda clan
- Shikano Castle
- Tottori Sand Dunes

== Culture ==
- Kaigara Bushi, a folk song

== Climate ==
Tottori has a humid subtropical climate (Köppen climate classification Cfa) with hot summers and cool winters. Precipitation is abundant throughout the year.

Climate data for Tottori (1991−2020 normals, extremes 1943−present)
Month	Jan	Feb	Mar	Apr	May	Jun	Jul	Aug	Sep	Oct	Nov	Dec	Year
Record high °C (°F)	20.4 (68.7)	23.2 (73.8)	27.0 (80.6)	31.7 (89.1)	34.4 (93.9)	36.5 (97.7)	39.1 (102.4)	39.6 (103.3)	37.9 (100.2)	32.6 (90.7)	28.1 (82.6)	22.9 (73.2)	39.6 (103.3)
Mean maximum °C (°F)	14.6 (58.3)	17.3 (63.1)	21.5 (70.7)	27.3 (81.1)	30.4 (86.7)	32.9 (91.2)	36.0 (96.8)	36.8 (98.2)	33.8 (92.8)	29.0 (84.2)	23.3 (73.9)	17.5 (63.5)	37.2 (99.0)
Mean daily maximum °C (°F)	8.1 (46.6)	9.1 (48.4)	13.1 (55.6)	18.9 (66.0)	23.8 (74.8)	26.9 (80.4)	30.9 (87.6)	32.6 (90.7)	27.8 (82.0)	22.4 (72.3)	16.8 (62.2)	10.9 (51.6)	20.1 (68.2)
Daily mean °C (°F)	4.2 (39.6)	4.7 (40.5)	7.9 (46.2)	13.2 (55.8)	18.1 (64.6)	22.0 (71.6)	26.2 (79.2)	27.3 (81.1)	22.9 (73.2)	17.2 (63.0)	11.9 (53.4)	6.8 (44.2)	15.2 (59.4)
Mean daily minimum °C (°F)	1.1 (34.0)	1.0 (33.8)	3.1 (37.6)	7.6 (45.7)	12.9 (55.2)	17.9 (64.2)	22.5 (72.5)	23.3 (73.9)	19.0 (66.2)	12.9 (55.2)	7.7 (45.9)	3.2 (37.8)	11.0 (51.8)
Mean minimum °C (°F)	−2.8 (27.0)	−2.6 (27.3)	−1.5 (29.3)	1.1 (34.0)	6.6 (43.9)	12.2 (54.0)	18.4 (65.1)	18.9 (66.0)	13.2 (55.8)	7.0 (44.6)	2.6 (36.7)	−0.9 (30.4)	−3.5 (25.7)
Record low °C (°F)	−6.5 (20.3)	−7.4 (18.7)	−4.7 (23.5)	−2.2 (28.0)	2.2 (36.0)	7.5 (45.5)	12.6 (54.7)	12.9 (55.2)	8.4 (47.1)	2.9 (37.2)	−2.4 (27.7)	−5.6 (21.9)	−7.4 (18.7)
Average precipitation mm (inches)	201.2 (7.92)	154.0 (6.06)	144.3 (5.68)	102.2 (4.02)	123.0 (4.84)	146.0 (5.75)	188.6 (7.43)	128.6 (5.06)	225.4 (8.87)	153.6 (6.05)	145.9 (5.74)	218.4 (8.60)	1,931.3 (76.04)
Average snowfall cm (inches)	55 (22)	49 (19)	11 (4.3)	0 (0)	0 (0)	0 (0)	0 (0)	0 (0)	0 (0)	0 (0)	0 (0)	27 (11)	140 (55)
Average precipitation days (≥ 0.5 mm)	22.4	17.8	16.3	12.5	11.0	12.5	13.2	10.4	13.7	12.8	15.5	20.3	178.4
Average relative humidity (%)	76	74	70	67	68	74	76	74	77	76	75	76	74
Mean monthly sunshine hours	69.0	83.7	131.3	177.4	201.4	153.9	166.5	203.8	143.4	146.1	110.7	82.6	1,669.9
Source: Japan Meteorological Agency
