= List of Natural Monuments of Japan (Tottori) =

This list is of the Natural Monuments of Japan within the Prefecture of Tottori.

== National Natural Monuments ==
As of 1 April 2021, twenty Natural Monuments have been designated, including two *Special Natural Monuments; the Southern Native Limit of the Japanese rose includes an area of Ibaraki Prefecture.

Monument	Municipality	Comments	Image	Coordinates	Type	Ref.
*Japanese giant salamander Andrias japonicus オオサンショウウオ; Õsanshōuo		designated across eighteen prefectures			1.2	
*Daisen Japanese yew Forest; Taxus cuspidata var. nana 大山のダイセンキャラボク純林; Daisen no Daisen kyaraboku junrin	Daisen			35°22′20″N 133°32′04″E	2.2	
Shiba Inu; Canis familiaris 柴犬; Shiba inu					1.4	
Japanese dormouse Glirulus japonicus ヤマネ; Yamane		found in Honshū, Shikoku, and Kyūshū			1.1	
Golden eagle Aquila chrysaetos イヌワシ; Inuwashi					1.2	
White-tailed eagle Haliaeetus albicilla オジロワシ; Ojirowashi					1.2	
Bean goose Anser fabalis ヒシクイ; Hishikui					1.2	
Greater white-fronted goose Anser albifrons マガン; Magan					1.2	
Uradome Coast 浦富海岸; Uradome kaigan	Iwami	also a Place of Scenic Beauty		35°35′23″N 134°17′49″E		
Ōnomi no Sukune no Mikoto Jinja Verdure 大野見宿禰命神社社叢; Ōnomi no Sukune no Mikoto Jinja shasō	Tottori			35°30′05″N 134°12′08″E	2.1	
Kara River Japanese iris Communities; Iris laevigata 唐川のカキツバタ群落; Kara-kawa no kakitsubata gunraku	Iwami			35°29′17″N 134°19′45″E	2.4	
Spindasis takanonis Butterfly Habitat キマダラルリツバメチョウ生息地; Kimadararuritsubame-chō seisoku-chi	Tottori			35°30′23″N 134°14′27″E	2.2	
Kurata Hachimangū Verdure 倉田八幡宮社叢; Kurata Hachimangū shasō	Tottori			35°27′55″N 134°13′31″E	2.1	
Japanese yews of Mount Sentsū; Taxus cuspidata 船通山のイチイ; Sentsū-zan no ichii	Nichinan			35°09′19″N 133°10′45″E	2.1	
Tottori Sand Dunes 鳥取砂丘; Tottori sakyū	Tottori			35°32′31″N 134°13′49″E	3.5,9	
Hakuto Jinja Verdure 白兎神社樹叢; Hakuto Jinja jusō	Tottori			35°31′28″N 134°06′53″E	2.1	
Hahaki Jinja Verdure 波波伎神社社叢; Hahaki Jinja shasō	Kurayoshi			35°27′55″N 133°51′15″E	2.1	
Giant Chinquapins of Hōki; Castanopsis 伯耆の大シイ; Hōki no ōshii	Kotoura			35°26′01″N 133°41′02″E	2.1	
Matsugami Jinja Sakaki Forest; Cleyera japonica 松上神社のサカキ樹林; Matsugami Jinja no sakaki jurin	Tottori			35°26′01″N 133°41′02″E	2.2	
Southern Native Limit of the Japanese rose Rosa rugosa ハマナス自生南限地帯; Hamanasu jisei nangen chitai	Daisen, Tottori	designation includes an area of Kashima in Ibaraki Prefecture		35°31′36″N 134°07′13″E	2.10	

April 2021

== Prefectural Natural Monuments ==
As of 1 May 2020, fifty-six Natural Monuments have been designated at a prefectural level.

== Municipal Natural Monuments ==
As of 1 May 2020, eighty-nine Natural Monuments have been designated at a municipal level.

== See also ==
- Cultural Properties of Japan
- Parks and gardens in Tottori Prefecture
- List of Places of Scenic Beauty of Japan (Tottori)
- List of Historic Sites of Japan (Tottori)
