= List of places of scenic beauty of Japan (Tottori) =

This list is of the places of scenic beauty of Japan located within the Prefecture of Tottori.

== National Places of Scenic Beauty ==
As of 1 January 2025, six Places have been designated at a national level.

Site	Municipality	Comments	Image	Coordinates	Type	Ref.
Uradome Coast 浦富海岸; Uradome kaigan	Iwami	also a Natural Monument		35°35′23″N 134°17′49″E	5, 8	
Kannon-in Gardens 観音院庭園; Kannonin teien	Tottori			35°29′46″N 134°14′30″E	1	
Mount Mitoku 三徳山; Sōrinji teien	Misasa	also an Historic Site; the Nagaire-dō of Sanbutsu-ji is a National Treasure		35°23′51″N 133°57′30″E	5, 6, 10	
Ojika-kei 小鹿渓; Ojika-kei	Misasa			35°22′26″N 133°58′32″E	5, 6	
Fukada Family Gardens 深田氏庭園; Fukada-shi teien	Yonago			35°25′50″N 133°21′35″E	1	
Ozaki Family Gardens 尾崎氏庭園; Ozaki-shi teien	Yurihama			35°30′19″N 133°53′44″E	1	

== Prefectural Places of Scenic Beauty ==
As of 1 May 2014, thirteen Places have been designated at a prefectural level.

Site	Municipality	Comments	Image	Coordinates	Type	Ref.
Ishitani Family Gardens 石谷氏庭園; Ishitani-shi teien	Chizu			35°16′13″N 134°13′48″E		
Ogawa Family Gardens 小川氏庭園; Ogawa-shi teien	Kurayoshi			35°25′44″N 133°48′42″E		
Kawamoto Family Gardens 河本氏庭園; Kawamoto-shi teien	Kotoura			35°30′56″N 133°36′56″E		
Kuwata Family Gardens 桑田氏庭園; Kuwata-shi teien	Kurayoshi			35°25′54″N 133°49′28″E		
Kōzen-ji Gardens 興禅寺庭園; Kōzenji teien	Tottori			35°30′16″N 134°14′29″E		
Saihō-ji Gardens 西方寺庭園; Saihōji teien	Wakasa			35°20′36″N 134°23′57″E		
Shōji Family Gardens 庄司家庭園; Shōji-ke teien	Sakaiminato			35°31′03″N 133°12′34″E		
Shōzen-in Gardens 正善院庭園; Shōzenin teien	Misasa			35°24′01″N 133°57′21″E		
Shinkō-ji Gardens 心光寺庭園; Shinkōji teien	Yonago			35°26′05″N 133°19′34″E		
Takata Family Gardens 高田氏庭園; Takata-shi teien	Kurayoshi			35°25′55″N 133°49′22″E		
Mitaki-kei 三滝溪; Mitaki-kei	Tottori			35°22′24″N 134°04′31″E		
Izanrō Iwasaki Gardens 依山楼岩崎庭園; Izanrō Iwasaki teien	Misasa			35°24′40″N 133°53′40″E		
Kadokawa Family Gardens 門脇氏庭園; Kadokawa-shi teien	Daisen			35°29′01″N 133°27′57″E		

== Municipal Places of Scenic Beauty ==
As of 1 May 2024, eighteen Places have been designated at a municipal level.

Site	Municipality	Comments	Image	Coordinates	Type	Ref.
Hōryū-in Gardens 宝隆院庭園; Hōryūin teien	Tottori			35°30′26″N 134°14′15″E		
Jõden-ji Gardens 譲傳寺庭園; Jõdenji teien	Tottori			35°27′37″N 134°02′52″E		

== Registered Places of Scenic Beauty ==
As of 27 January 2025, four Monuments have been registered (as opposed to designated) as Places of Scenic Beauty at a national level.

Place	Municipality	Comments	Image	Coordinates	Type	Ref.
Ishitani Family Gardens 石谷氏庭園; Ishitani-shi teien	Chizu			35°16′13″N 134°13′48″E		
Ogawa Family Gardens 小川氏庭園; Ogawa-shi teien	Kurayoshi			35°25′44″N 133°48′42″E		
Mount Mani 摩尼山; Mani-san	Tottori			35°31′56″N 134°16′12″E		
Marui Family Gardens 丸井氏庭園; Marui-shi teien	Kurayoshi					

== See also ==
- Cultural Properties of Japan
- List of Historic Sites of Japan (Tottori)
- List of Cultural Properties of Japan – paintings (Tottori)
- List of parks and gardens of Tottori Prefecture
