= List of cultural properties of Japan – paintings (Tottori) =

This list is of the cultural properties of Japan designated in the category of paintings (絵画, kaiga) for the Prefecture of Tottori.

== National Cultural Properties ==
As of 1 July 2019, three Important Cultural Properties have been designated (including one *National Treasure), being of national significance.

Property	Date	Municipality	Ownership	Comments	Image	Dimensions	Coordinates	Ref.
*Fugen Bosatsu, colour on silk 絹本著色普賢菩薩像 kenpon chakushoku Fugen Bosatsu zō	late Heian period	Chizu	Bujō-ji (豊乗寺)			102.4 centimetres (40.3 in) by 52.1 centimetres (20.5 in)	35°15′38″N 134°12′23″E	
Fugen and the Ten Rakshasa, colour on silk 絹本著色普賢十羅刹女像 kenpon chakushoku Fugen jū-rasetsu-nyo zō	Kamakura period	Tottori	Jōnin-ji (常忍寺)	with two of the Four Heavenly Kings in the foreground and two bodhisattvas behind			35°30′08″N 134°13′18″E	
Yōryū Kannon, colour on silk 絹本著色楊柳観音像 kenpon chakushoku Yōryū Kannon zō	Goryeo dynasty	Tottori	Bujō-ji (豊乗寺) (kept at Tottori Prefectural Museum)	Goryeo Buddhist painting; alternatively identified as of Yuan origin		106 centimetres (42 in) by 54.6 centimetres (21.5 in)	35°30′30″N 134°14′10″E	

== Prefectural Cultural Properties ==
As of 1 May 2019, twenty-six properties have been designated at a prefectural level.

Property	Date	Municipality	Ownership	Comments	Image	Dimensions	Coordinates	Ref.
Dragon and Tiger byōbu 龍虎図屏風 ryūko zu byōbu	late Edo period	Tottori	private	pair of six-fold screens by Katayama Yōkoku (片山楊谷)				
Sanpō-Kōjin, colour on silk 絹本着色三宝荒神像 kenpon chakushoku Sanpō-Kōjin zō	Kamakura period	Tottori	Daiankō-ji (大安興寺) (kept at Tottori Prefectural Museum)			98.4 centimetres (38.7 in) by 39.7 centimetres (15.6 in)	35°30′30″N 134°14′10″E	
Aizen Myōō, colour on silk 絹本着色愛染明王像 kenpon chakushoku Aizen Myōō zō	Kamakura period	Tottori	Daiankō-ji (大安興寺) (kept at Tottori Prefectural Museum)			98.1 centimetres (38.6 in) by 39.6 centimetres (15.6 in)	35°30′30″N 134°14′10″E	
Godai Myōō, colour on silk 絹本着色五大明王像 kenpon chakushoku Godai Myōō zō	Kamakura period	Tottori	Daiankō-ji (大安興寺) (kept at Tottori Prefectural Museum)	five scrolls		144 centimetres (57 in) by 70 centimetres (28 in) (Fudō Myōō); 108 centimetres (43 in) by 54 centimetres (21 in)	35°30′30″N 134°14′10″E	
Partition paintings from the Former Kōkoku-ji Shoin 旧興国寺書院障壁画 kyū-Kōkokuji shoin shōhekiga	1796	Tottori	Tottori Prefectural Museum				35°30′30″N 134°14′10″E	
The Tale of Heike (Vanguard at Uji River and the Dropped Bow), byōbu 平家物語 宇治川先陣・弓流図屏風; Heike monogatari Uji-gawa senjin・yumi-nagashi byōbu	C19	Tottori	Watanabe Art Museum	by Nemoto Yūga (根本幽峨)			35°31′14″N 134°13′39″E	
Ikeda Tsuneoki, by Kanō Naonobu 池田恒興像（狩野尚信筆） Ikeda Tsuneoki zō (Kanō Naonobu hitsu)	C17	Tottori	Tottori Prefectural Museum			81 centimetres (32 in) by 37 centimetres (15 in)	35°30′30″N 134°14′10″E	
500 Arhats 五百羅漢図 gohyaku rakan zu	C18	Kurayoshi	private	one hundred scrolls; by local artist Yoshida Hosui (吉田保水)				
Bamboo and Plum, colour on paper with gold ground - Plants and Insects, colour on paper 紙本金地著色竹梅図・紙本著色草虫図 衝立 shihon kinji chakushoku chikubai zu・shihon chakushoku sōchū zu tsuitate	late Edo period	Tottori	Tottori Prefectural Museum	pair of screens by Oki Ichiga (沖一峨)			35°30′30″N 134°14′10″E	
Amida Triad, colour on silk 絹本着色阿弥陀三尊来迎図 kenpon chakushoku Amida sanzon zu	C14	Tottori	private					
Kiku Jidō and Flowers and Birds 菊慈童・花鳥図; Kiku Jidō kachō zu	late Edo period	Tottori	private	three scrolls by Katayama Yōkoku (片山楊谷)				
Tōhō Saku, colour on silk 絹本著色東方朔図 kenpon chakushoku Tōhō Saku zu	Edo period	Tottori	Tottori Prefectural Museum	by Hijikata Tōrei (土方稲嶺)		99.8 centimetres (39.3 in) by 40.6 centimetres (16.0 in)	35°30′30″N 134°14′10″E	
Tigers and Bamboo byōbu 竹虎図屏風 chikko zu byōbu	late Edo period	Tottori	private	pair of six-fold screens by Katayama Yōkoku (片山楊谷)		153.4 centimetres (60.4 in) by 358.7 centimetres (141.2 in)		
Journey to the East, Scenes of Cultivation, and Flowers 絹本著色東下り・耕作・草花図 kenpon chakushoku azuma-kudari kōsaku kusabana zu	late Edo period	Tottori	Tottori Prefectural Museum	five scrolls by Oki Ichiga (沖一峨); Journey to the East is based on an episode in Ise Monogatari			35°30′30″N 134°14′10″E	
Mandala of the Two Realms, colour on silk 絹本著色不動明王像 kenpon chakushoku ryōkai mandara zu	Kamakura period	Tottori	Bujō-ji (豊乗寺) (kept at Tottori Prefectural Museum)			143 centimetres (56 in) by 130 centimetres (51 in)	35°30′30″N 134°14′10″E	
Fudō Myōō, colour on silk 絹本著色不動明王像 kenpon chakushoku Fudō Myōō zō	Kamakura period	Tottori	Bujō-ji (豊乗寺) (kept at Tottori Prefectural Museum)			86 centimetres (34 in) by 39 centimetres (15 in)	35°30′30″N 134°14′10″E	
Flowers and Birds, colour on silk 絹本著色花鳥図 kenpon chakushoku kachō zu	late Edo period	Chizu	private	two scrolls; by Shimada Gentan (島田元旦)		134 centimetres (53 in) by 70 centimetres (28 in)	35°15′52″N 134°13′35″E	
Shaka and the Sixteen Benevolent Deities, colour on silk 絹本著色釈迦十六善神像 kenpon chakushoku Shaka jūroku zenjin zō	late Kamakura period	Tottori	Daiankō-ji (大安興寺) (kept at Tottori Prefectural Museum)				35°30′30″N 134°14′10″E	
Saigyō Viewing Mount Fuji, colour on silk 絹本著色富士見西行図 kenpon chakushoku Fuji-mi Saigyō zu	late Edo period	Tottori	private (kept at Tottori Prefectural Museum)	three scrolls, with inscriptions by Kagawa Kageki (香川景樹) and Kamo Suetaka (加茂季鷹); by Oki Tanyō (沖探容)		106.7 centimetres (42.0 in) by 33.5 centimetres (13.2 in)	35°30′30″N 134°14′10″E	
Shoal of Carp, colour on silk 絹本著色群鯉図 kenpon chakushoku gunkoi zu	1836	Tottori	Tottori Prefectural Museum	by Kuroda Tōkō (黒田稲皐)		146 centimetres (57 in) by 55.2 centimetres (21.7 in)	35°30′30″N 134°14′10″E	
Shoal of Swimming Carp, ink on paper, six-fold byōbu 紙本墨画群鯉游泳図六曲屏風 shihon bokuga gunkoi yūei zu rokkyoku byōbu	1824	Tottori	Tottori Prefectural Museum	pair of screens; by Kuroda Tōkō (黒田稲皐) (alternatively attributed to Kuroda Inamine (黒田稲嶺))		160 centimetres (63 in) by 375.5 centimetres (147.8 in)	35°30′30″N 134°14′10″E	
Fierce Tigers, colour on silk 絹本著色猛虎図 kenpon chakushoku mōko zu	late C18	Tottori	private (kept at Tottori Prefectural Museum)	three scrolls by Katayama Yōkoku (片山楊谷)			35°30′30″N 134°14′10″E	
Dragon in Clouds, ink on paper 紙本墨画雲竜図 shihon bokuga unryū zu	late Edo period	Tottori	Tottori Prefectural Museum	two scrolls; by Hijikata Tōrei (土方稲嶺)		57.5 centimetres (22.6 in) by 134.0 centimetres (52.8 in)	35°30′30″N 134°14′10″E	
Old Tree, light colour on paper 紙本淡彩老樹図 shihon tansai roju zu	late Edo period	Tottori	private	by Takebe Bokusai (建部僕斎)			35°29′31″N 134°14′47″E	
Thirty-Six Immortals of Poetry 三十六歌仙額 shihon tansai roju zu	1650	Tottori	Tottori Tōshō-gū (kept at Tottori Prefectural Museum)	thirty-six panels by Kanō Tan'yū (Ono no Komachi pictured)		58.7 centimetres (23.1 in) by 36.8 centimetres (14.5 in)	35°30′30″N 134°14′10″E	
View of Edo, colour on silk 絹本著色江戸風景図 kenpon chakushoku Edo fūkei zu	Edo period	Tottori	private (kept at Tottori Prefectural Museum)				35°30′30″N 134°14′10″E	

== See also ==
- Cultural Properties of Japan
- List of National Treasures of Japan (paintings)
- Japanese painting
- Kamiyodo Haiji
- List of Historic Sites of Japan (Tottori)
- List of Museums in Tottori Prefecture
