= Sanin Kaigan National Park =

National Park in Sanin, Japan

- 山陰海岸国立公園
- IUCN category II (national park)
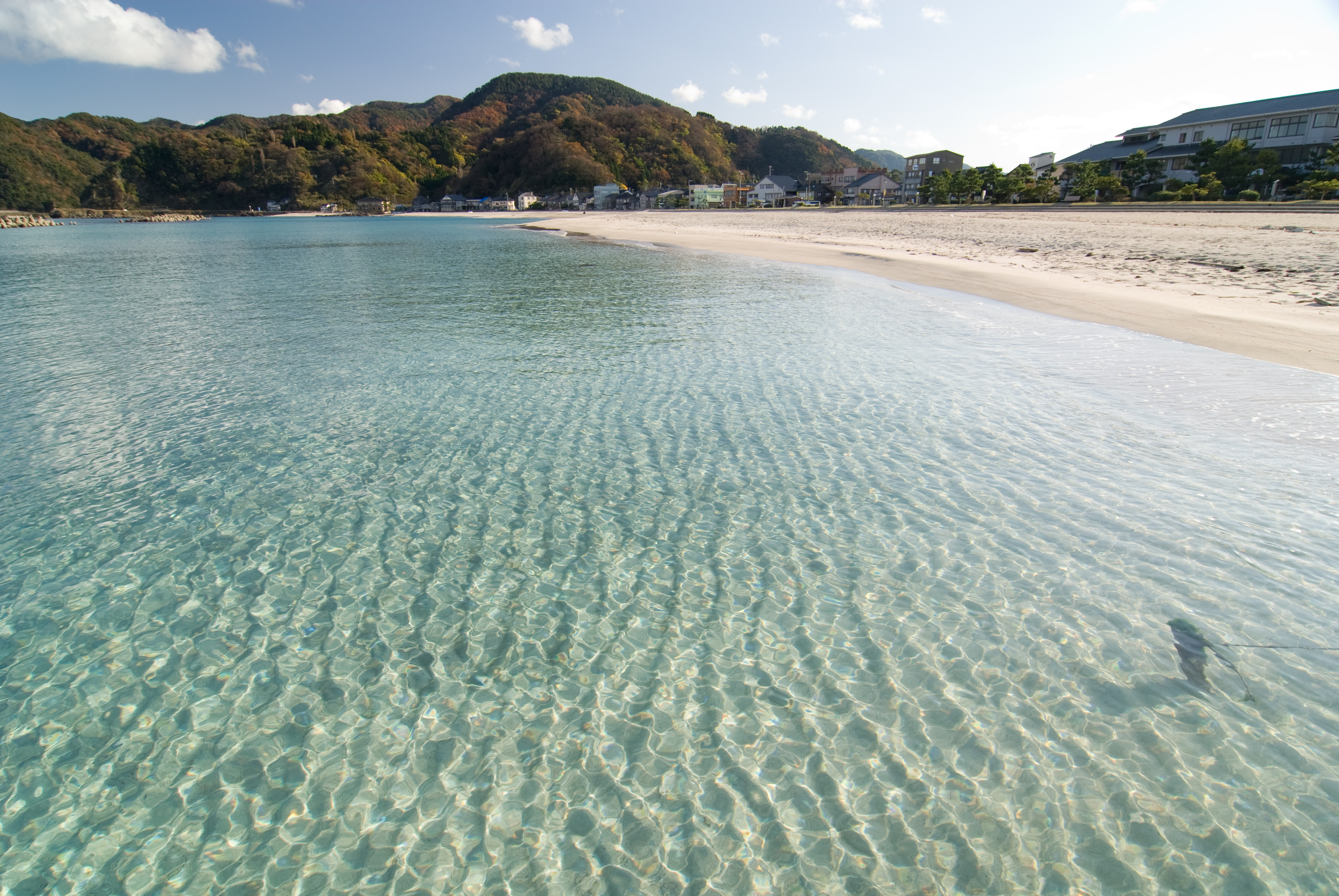
- Takeno Beach
- Location: San'in, Japan
- Area: 87.83 km^{2} (33.91 sq mi)
- Established: 15 July 1963
- Governing body: Ministry of the Environment (Japan)

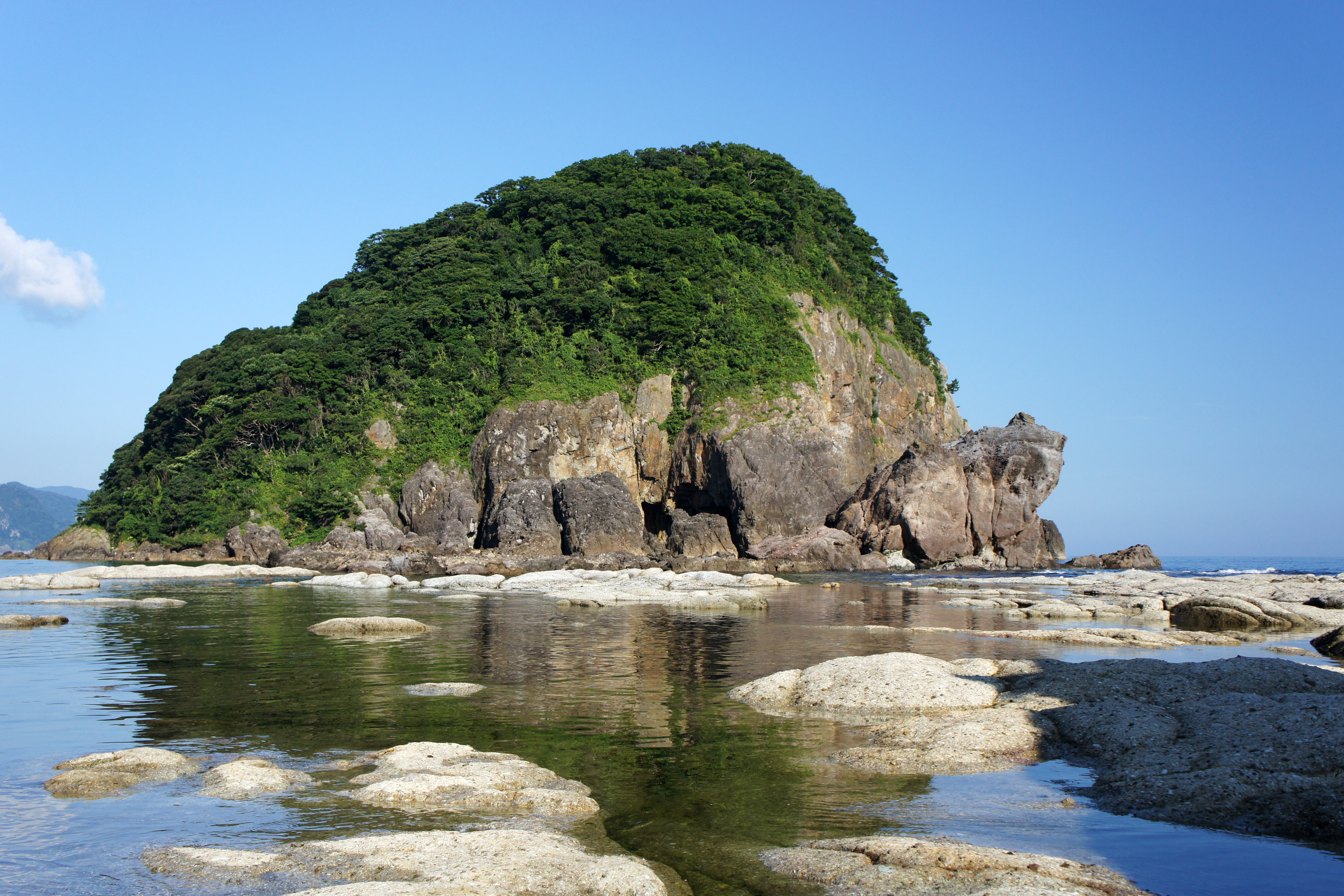
Imagoura of Kasumi Coast in Kami, Hyōgo Prefecture, Japan.

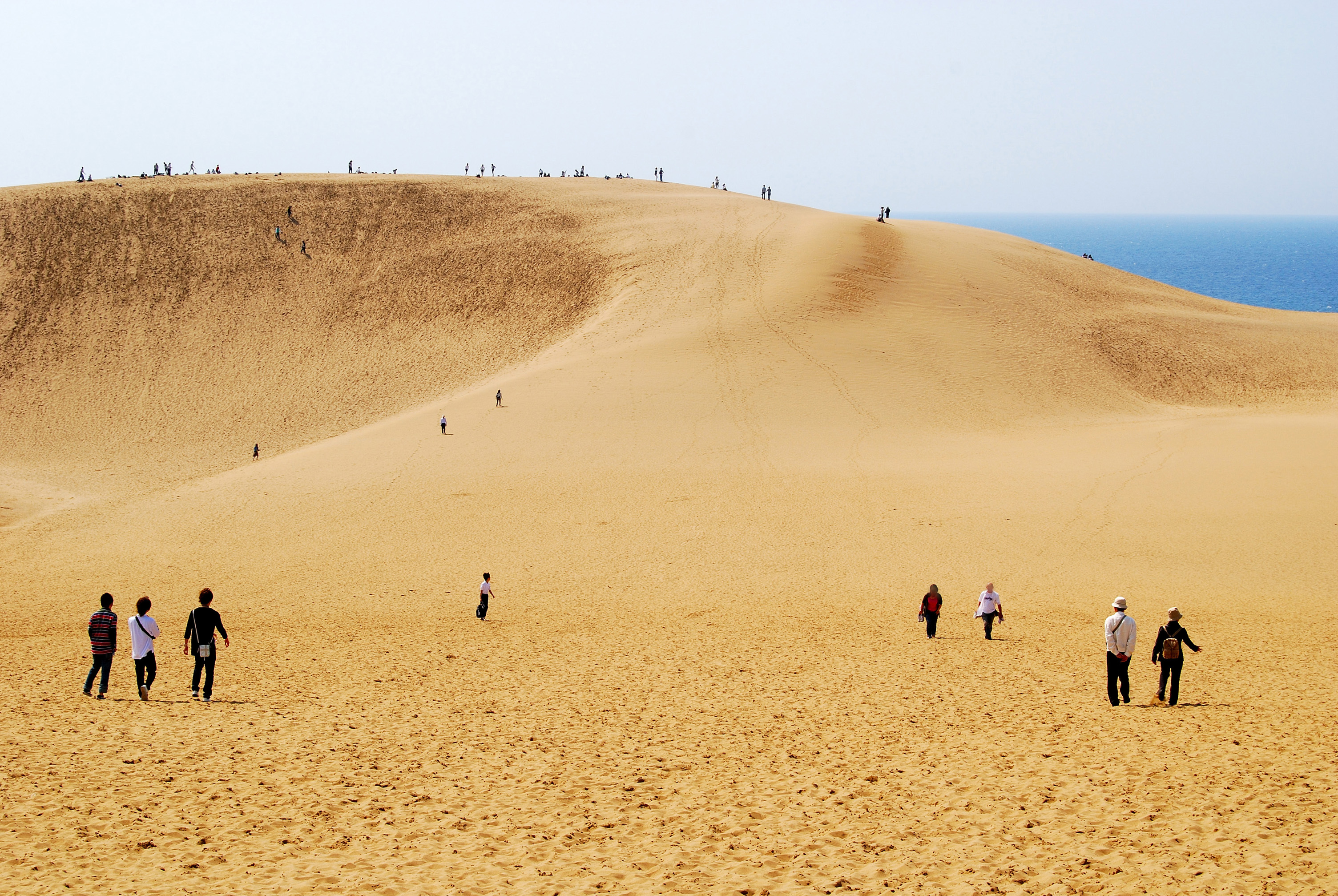
Tottori Sand Dunes in Tottori, Tottori prefecture, Japan.

Sanin Kaigan National Park (山陰海岸国立公園, San'in Kaigan Kokuritsu Kōen) is a National Park in the Tottori, Hyōgo, and Kyōto Prefectures, Japan. Established in 1963, the park runs continuously along the Sea of Japan coast from Tottori to Kyōtango. The park covers an area of 87.83 km^{2}. Sanin Kaigan National Park is known for its numerous inlets, rock formations, islands, and caves.

The entire area of this national park is a part of San'in Kaigan Global Geopark.

== Sites of interest ==
- Genbudō Cave (玄武洞)
- Kasumi Coast (香住海岸)
- Tajima Coast (但馬海岸)
- Takeno Coast (竹野海岸)
- Tottori Sand Dunes
- Uradome Coast (浦富海岸)

== Noted fauna and flora ==
- Pinus thunbergii, the Japanese black pine
- Japanese martin
- Black-tailed gull

== Related municipalities ==
- Kyōto: Kyōtango
- Hyōgo: Kami, Shin'onsen, Toyooka
- Tottori: Iwami, Tottori

== See also ==
- List of national parks of Japan
- Wakasa Wan Quasi-National Park
- Tourism in Japan
