= Luna Terrace =

The Luna Terrace is an outdoor research facility featuring a lunar analog test field in Tottori city, Japan. The facility is run by Tottori Prefecture and is located inside the Tottori Sand Dunes.

From 2025, the annual Tottori Rover Challenge competition has been held at Luna Terrace.

== History ==
Luna Terrace was inaugurated on 7 July 2023. In September 2026, tests of the seismometer for NASA's Dragonfly space probe's DraGMet instrument suite, as well as penetrators for JAXA's future Mars mission were conducted at the Luna Terrace. The 2026 model of the Mitsubishi Pajero (Montero) SUV was tested at Luna Terrace.
