= Watanabe Museum of Art =

Watanabe Museum Of Art
- 渡辺美術館
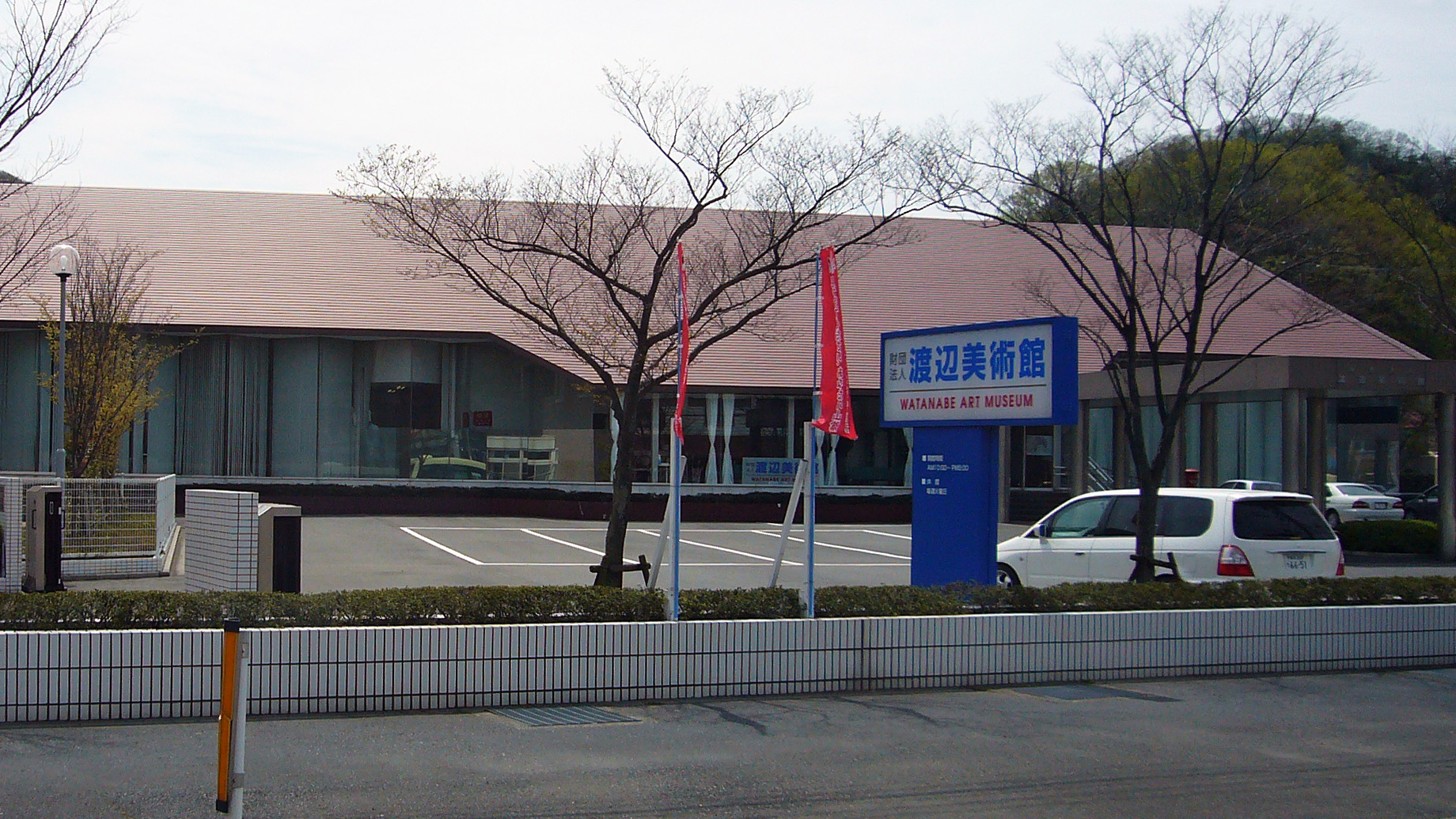
- Interactive map of the Watanabe Museum Of Art area

General information
- Location: 55 Kakuji, Tottori, Tottori Prefecture, Japan
- Coordinates: 35°31′14″N 134°13′39″E
- Opened: 1978

Technical details
- Floor area: 6,300 m^{2}

Website
- Official website

Watanabe Museum Of Art (渡辺美術館, Watanabe Bijutsukan) opened in Tottori, Tottori Prefecture, Japan in 1978. It houses the 30,000-piece collection of Tottori resident Dr. Hajime Watanabe (1911–2017). It holds the largest collection of Samurai armour and weapons in any museum in Japan.

== Art collection ==
The collection includes Buddhist sculpture and art from Japan and elsewhere, Chinese, Korean, and Japanese ceramics, ukiyo-e, and over 1,000 folding screens. It has been referred to as "a shrine for antiques".

== Armour and weapons collection ==
While front area of the museum is devoted to the art collection of the museum, the main larger body of the museum is dedicated to a large collection of armour and weapons. The museum has over half of its collection on display in a large display area, and with over 200 suits of samurai armour, it is the largest and most diverse collection of Samurai armour and weapons in Japan.

Samurai armour represented a range of armour harnesses from the Edo and warring states period.

It also houses a collection of items related to the Ikeda clan, the "daimyo" family that controlled Tottori during the Edo Period.

== See also ==
- Tottori Prefectural Museum
- Tottori Castle
