= Uradome Coast =

Coast located on the Sea of Japan in Tottori Prefecture, Japan

- IUCN category III (natural monument or feature)
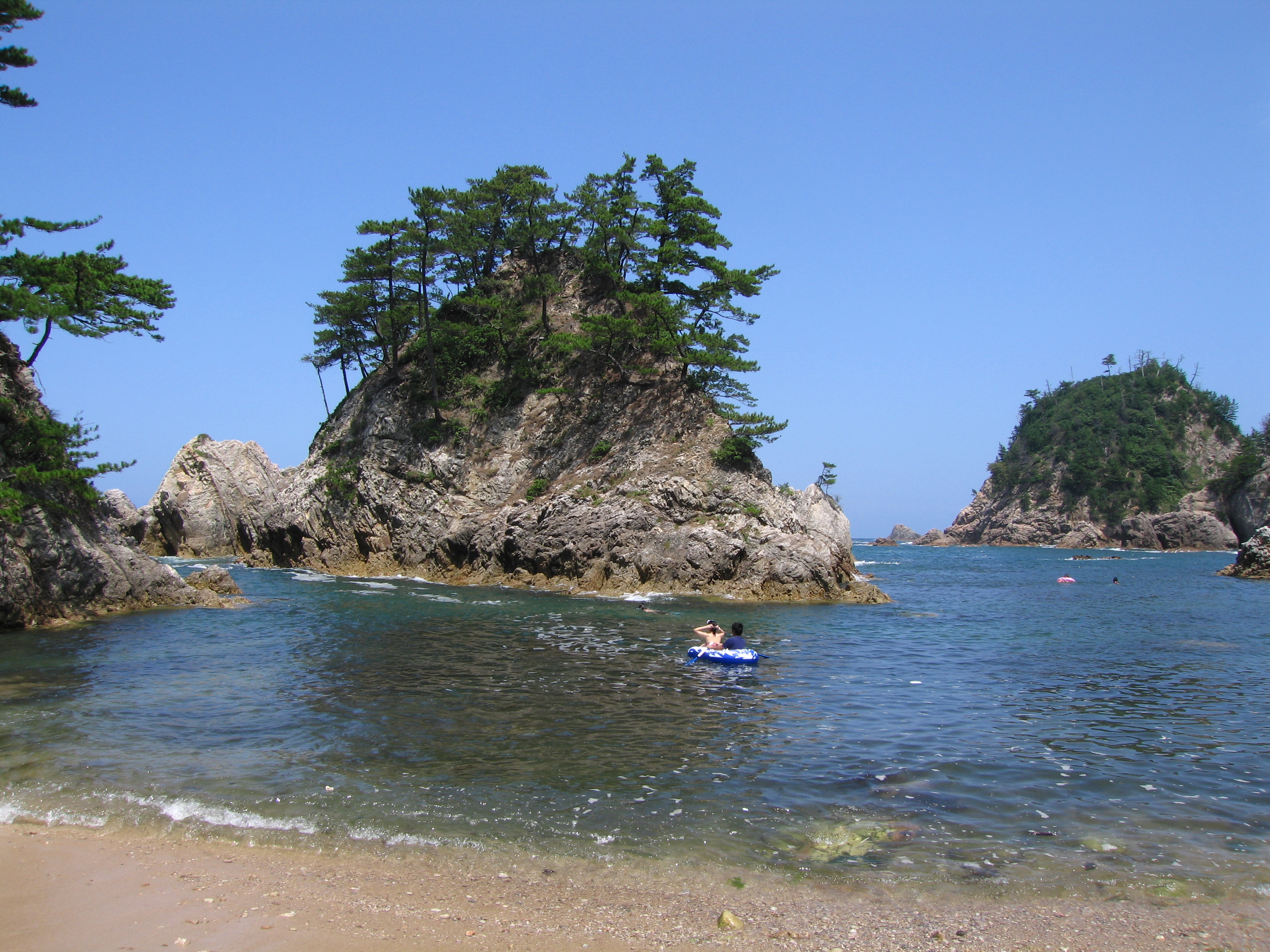
- Kamogaiso, Uradome Coast

- Location within Tottori Prefecture Location within Japan
- Location: Iwami, Tottori, Japan
- Coordinates: 35°35′25.37″N 134°19′34.39″E
- Length: 15 km (9.3 mi)
- Established: March 27, 1928
- National Place of Scenic Beauty Natural Monument

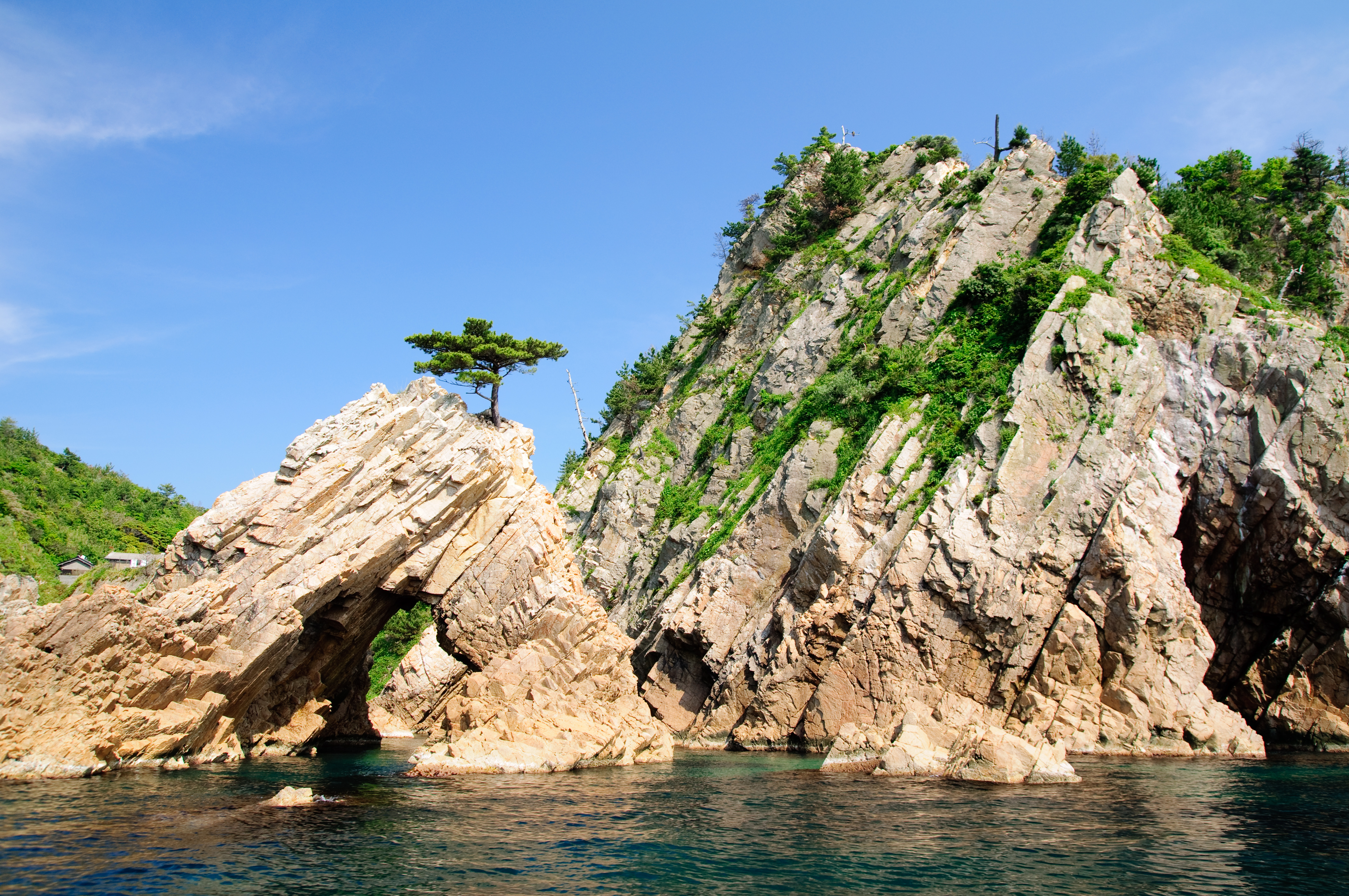
Senganmatsu Island on the Uradome Coast

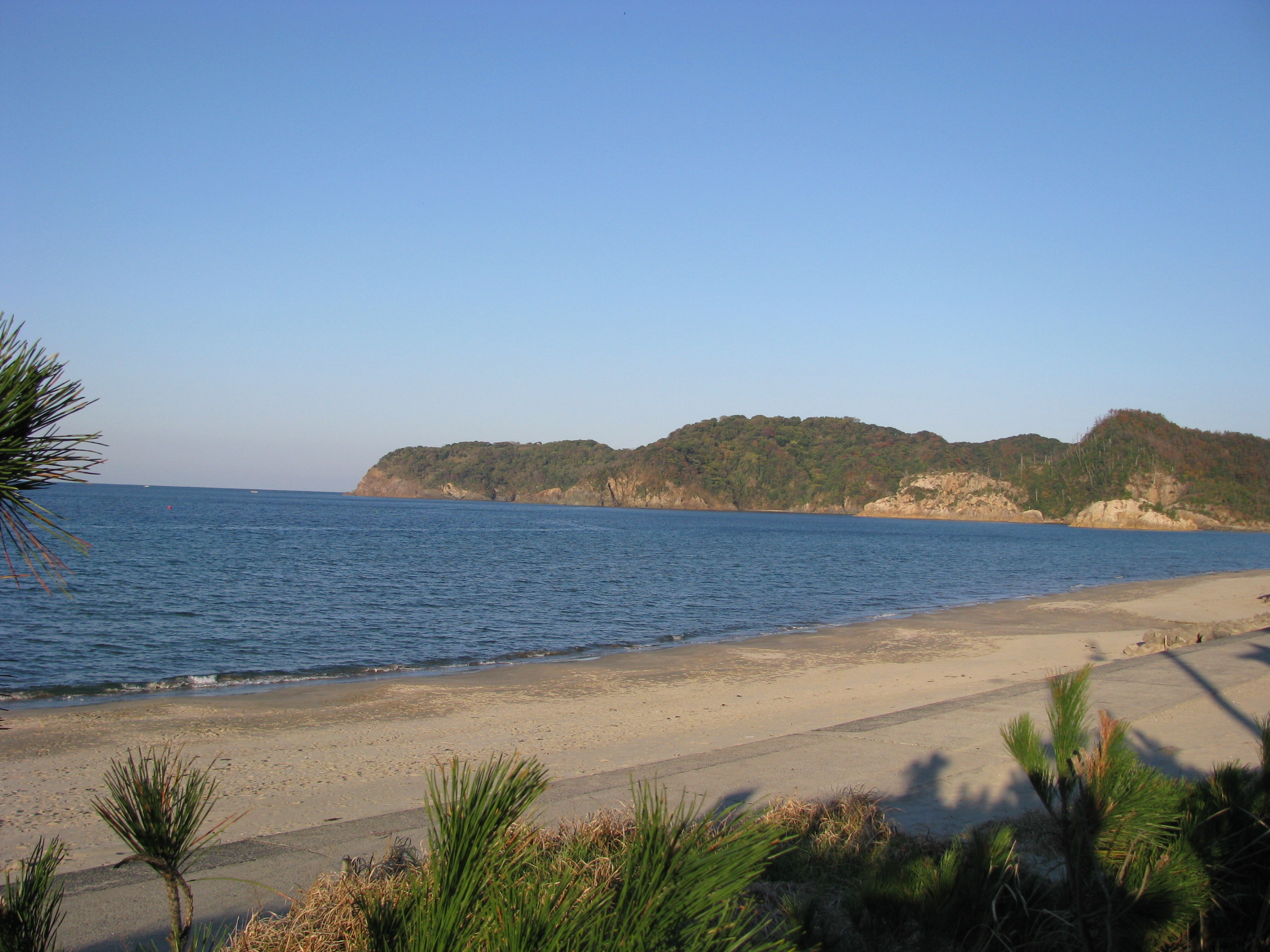
Uradome Coast, Iwami, Tottori Prefecture

Uradome Coast (浦富海岸, Uradome-kaigan) is a scenic ria coastal inlet located on the Sea of Japan in Iwami, Tottori Prefecture, Japan. This area was nationally designated as a Place of Scenic Beauty and Natural Monument on March 27, 1928 It was also voted one of the 100 Landscapes of Japan in 1927. It is one of the major geosites of San'in Kaigan Global Geopark.

== Geography ==
The Uradome Coast is made up of rocks formed by marine erosion, white sandy beaches, and dense scrub pines. The coast stretches for approximately 15 kilometers (9.3 mi) to 16 kilometers (9.9 mi) along the Sea of Japan on the eastern tip of Tottori Prefecture from Cape Kugami to Mount Shichiyama. Marine erosion has formed distinctive natural sea walls, cliffs, tunnels, caves, and large rocks of unusual shapes. The Uradome Coast is an important part of the Sanin Kaigan National Park.

The Uradome Coast is known as the "San'in Matsushima" due to its resemblance to Matsushima in Miyagi Prefecture. The author Tōson Shimazaki (1872–1943) was especially fond of the Uradome Coast. He praised the area with the quote "Matsushima is Matsushima, Uradome is Uradome".

== Etymology ==
The name of the Uradome Coast in Japanese is formed from two kanji. The first, 浦, means "inlet" and the second, 富 means "abundant" or "rich".

== Transportation ==
The Uradome Coast is to the east in close proximity to the Tottori Sand Dunes. The coast is a 25-minute drive from Tottori Station on the JR West Sanin Main Line.

== See also ==
- List of Places of Scenic Beauty of Japan (Tottori)
