= Sanbutsu-ji =

Buddhist temple in Misasa, Japan

Coordinates: 35°23′57.55″N 133°57′20.74″E

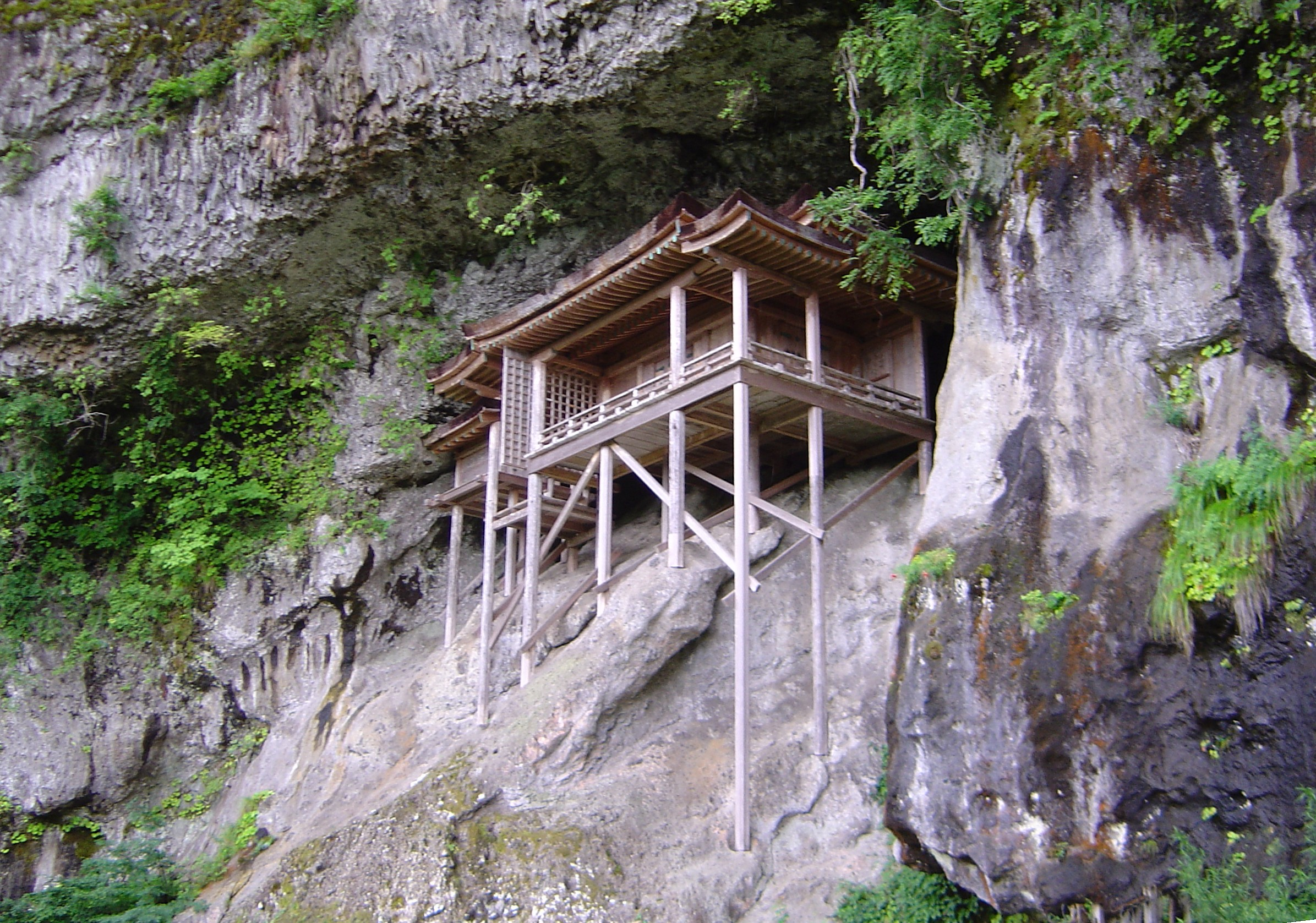
- Nageire-dō of Sanbutsu-ji

Religion
- Affiliation: Tendai
- Deity: Shaka Nyorai, Amida Nyorai, Dainichi Nyorai

Location
- Location: 1010 Mitoku, Misasa, Tottori Prefecture 〒682-0132
- Country: Japan
- Interactive map of Sanbutsu-ji

Architecture
- Completed: 849

Website
- www.mitokusan.jp

Sanbutsu-ji (三仏寺, Sanbutsu-ji) is a Buddhist temple in the town of Misasa, Tottori Prefecture, Japan. The Nageire Hall (投入堂, Nageire-dō) of Sanbutsu-ji, built in the Heian period is designated a National Treasure of Japan.

By tradition Sanbutsu-ji was founded by the Buddhist ascetic and mystic of the late Asuka period monk En no Gyōja (ca. 634–701). En no Gyōja is considered the founder of Shugendō, a syncretic religion which incorporated aspects Old Shinto, Japanese folk animism and shamanism, Taoism and esoteric Buddhism of the Shingon Mikkyō and the Tendai sects.

The Nageire-dō hall is perched on the steep cliffside, supported by stilts using the kakezukuri technique.

== See also ==
- List of National Treasures of Japan--Shrines
- En no Gyōja
- Shugendō
- Mount Mitoku
