= Mount Mitoku =

Mountain in Tottori Prefecture, Japan

- 三徳山
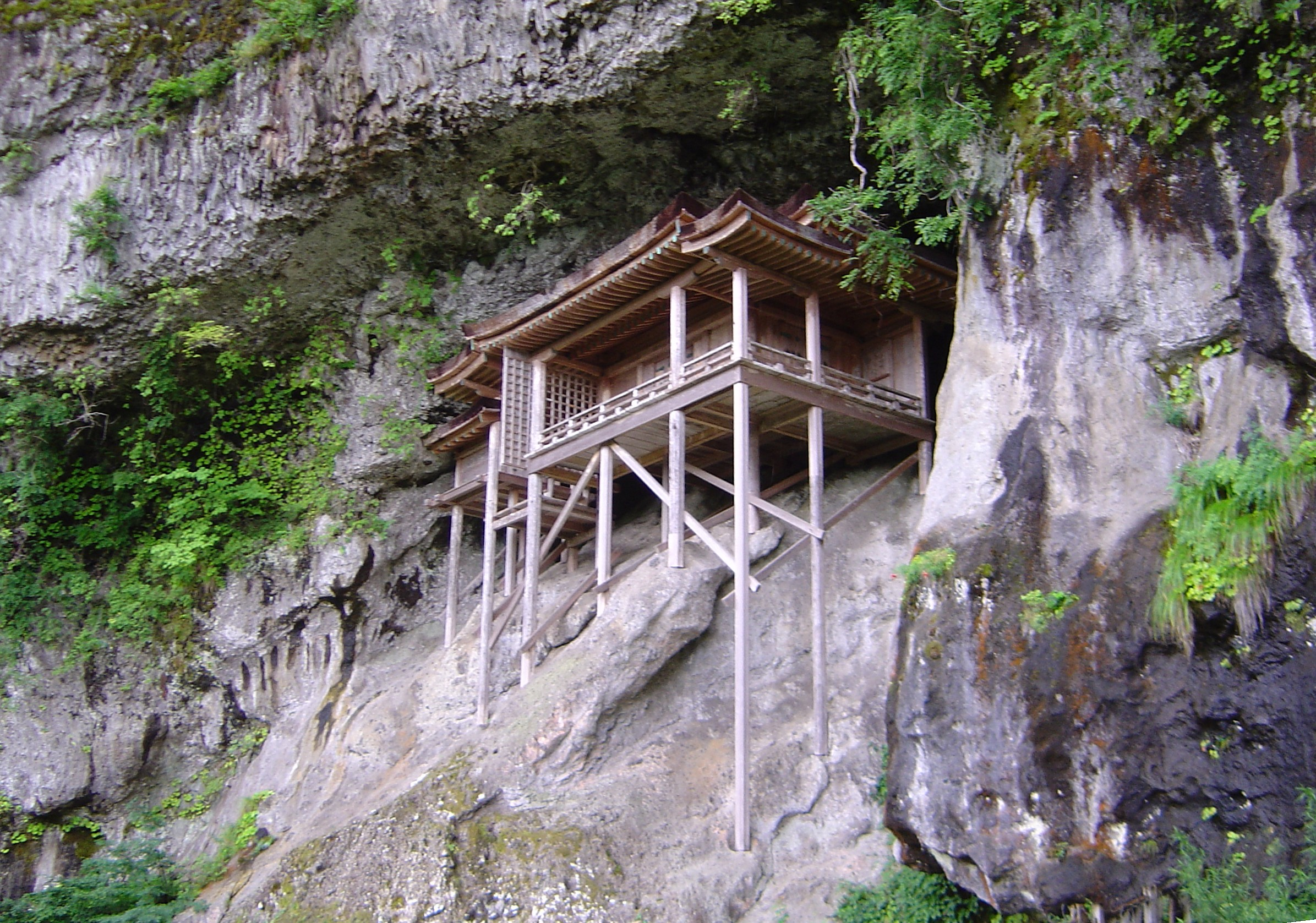
- Sanbutsu-ji on the face of Mount Mitoku

Highest point
- Elevation: 900 m (3,000 ft)
- Coordinates: 35°23′57.55″N 133°57′20.74″E

Naming
- Language of name: Japanese
- Pronunciation: Japanese: [Mitoku-san]

Geography
- Location within Japan
- Location: Tottori Prefecture, Japan
- Parent range: Chūgoku Mountains

Climbing
- Easiest route: Hiking

Mount Mitoku (三徳山, Mitoku-san) is a mountain located in Misasa, Tottori Prefecture. Mount Mitoku has an elevation of 900 m (2,953 ft). Mount Mitoku was known from ancient times as a place of both religious significance and scenic beauty. The mountain is home to Sanbutsu-ji, a historically significant temple designated an Important Treasure of Japan in 1952.

== Etymology ==
The name of Mount Mitoku in Japanese is formed from two kanji. The first, 三, means "three" and the second, 徳 means "virtue". Santoku (三徳) therefore refers to the three primary virtues of Buddhism: wisdom, renunciation, and judgement. Mount Mitoku was historically also written as 三美山 (Santoku) in Japanese, 三, meaning three and 美 meaning beautiful, but the pronunciation remained the same.

== Geography ==
Mount Mitoku was formed from a volcanic eruption approximately 15 million years ago in the Pleistocene period. The layers of granite and other conglomerates at the base of the mountain were transformed by a volcano into large pyroxene deposits. Mount Mitoku eroded over time by wind and rain. Erosion on the southern side of the mountain created steep cliffs of 40 m (131 ft) to 60 m (197 ft). Two rivers emerge from the slopes of Mount Mitoku: the Kotori River, which forms a deep valley, and one small unnamed river. The steep slopes of Mount Mitoku have created three waterfalls: namely, the Fudō, the Mahebi, and the Ryūtokuin. As the waterfalls are located deep in the primeval forest of Mount Mitoku, they are inaccessible to hikers.

== Flora ==
Mount Dōgo features outstanding examples of numerous trees, including the:

- Shiba chestnut
- Oak
- Kousa Dogwood

=== Transportation ===
Mount Dōgo can be accessed by bus from the Kurayoshi Station on the JR West Sanin Main Line. The mountain can be accessed from the bus stop at the entrance at Sanbutsu-ji, 40 minutes from Kurayoshi Station. The ascent to Sanbuts-ji is very steep, and entrance to buildings in the temple complex are a 40 to 50 minute hike from the foot of the mountain.

== Surrounding area ==
Mount Mitoku is 4.5 miles from the Misasa Onsen. Areas to the east and south of Mount Mitoku are mountainous, deeply forested, and sparsely populated.

== See also ==
- List of National Treasures of Japan: Shrines
- Sanbutsu-ji
