= Misasa, Tottori =

Misasa 三朝町
- Town
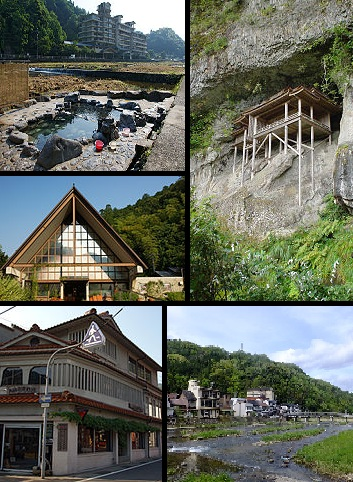
- Clockwise from top left: Misasa Spa, Sanbutsu Temple in Mount Mitoku, Mitoku River, Place of Team Hall (Jinsho no Yakata in Japanese), Misasa Art Museum

- Flag Emblem
- Interactive map of Misasa
- Location in Japan
- Coordinates: 35°25′N 133°52′E
- Country: Japan
- Region: Chūgoku; San'in
- Prefecture: Tottori
- District: Tōhaku

Government
  - Mayor: Hiroyuki Matsuura

Area
  - Total: 233.52 km^{2} (90.16 sq mi)

Population (December 31, 2022)
  - Total: 6,056
  - Density: 25.93/km^{2} (67.17/sq mi)
- Time zone: UTC+09:00 (JST)
- City hall address: 999-2 Ōaza Ōze, Misasa-chō, Tottori-ken 682-0195
- Website: Official website
- Symbols
- Flower: Rhododendron
- Tree: Aesculus

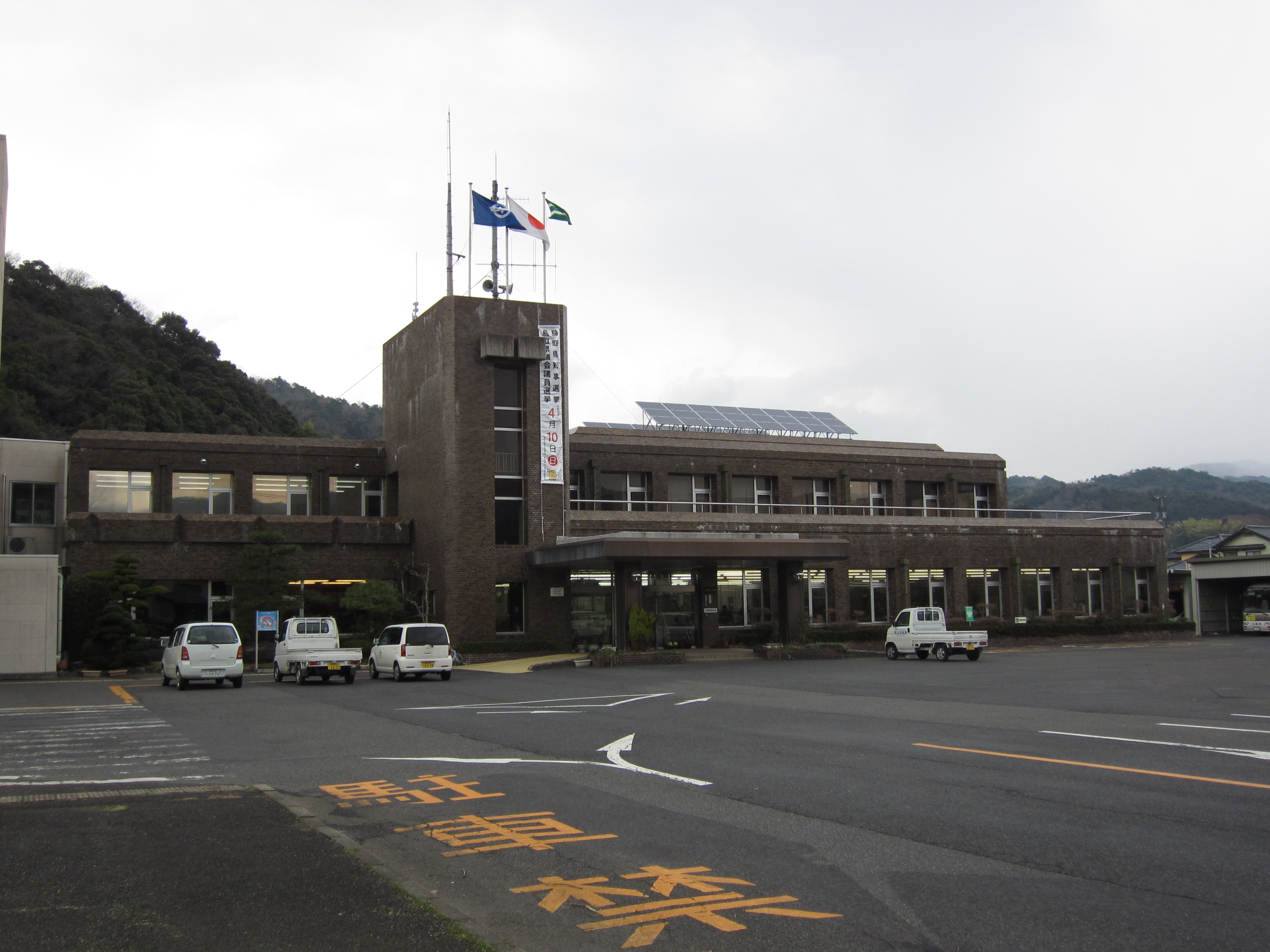
Misasa town hall

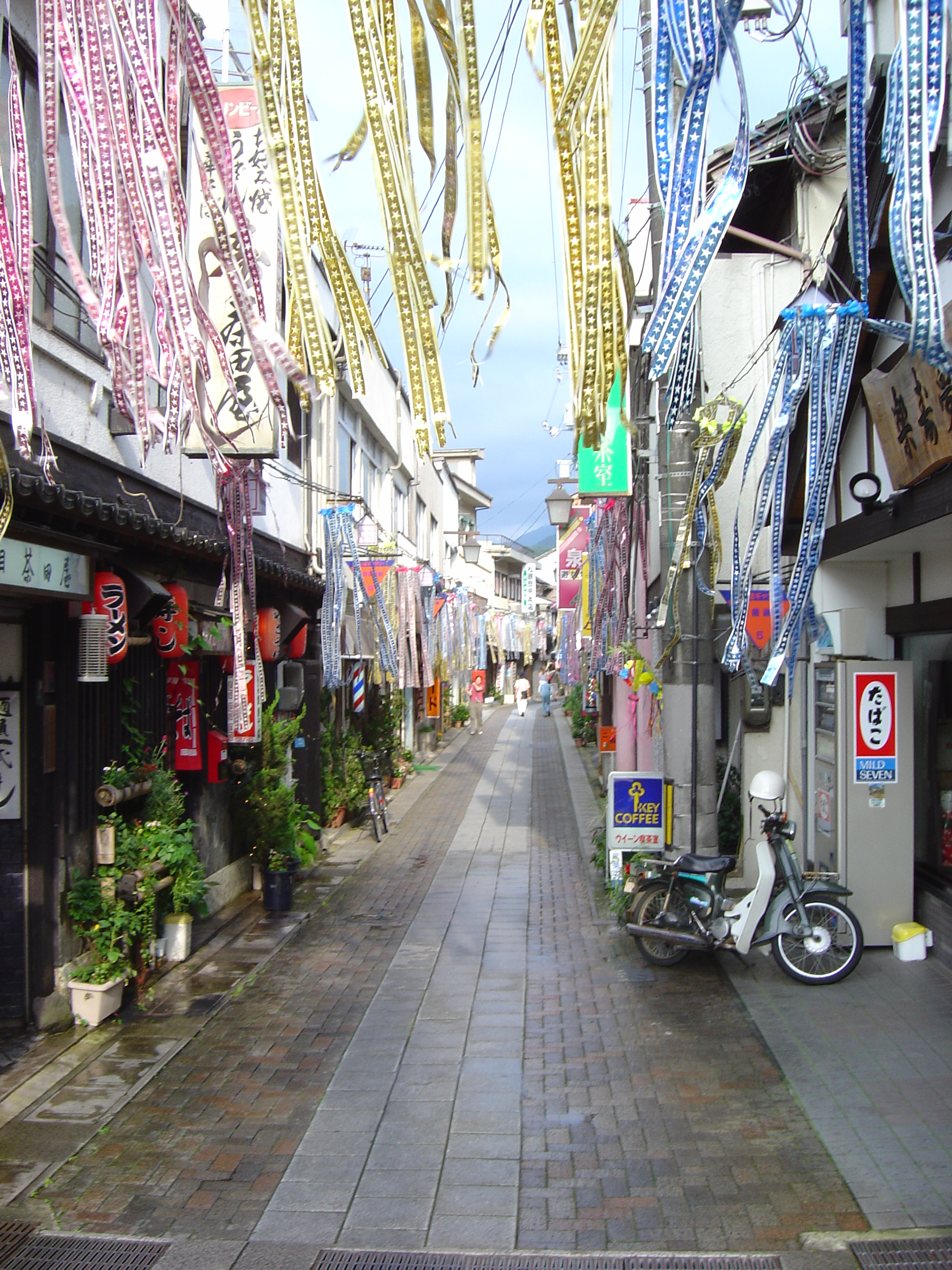
A street in the center of Misasa shortly before the Marie Curie festival

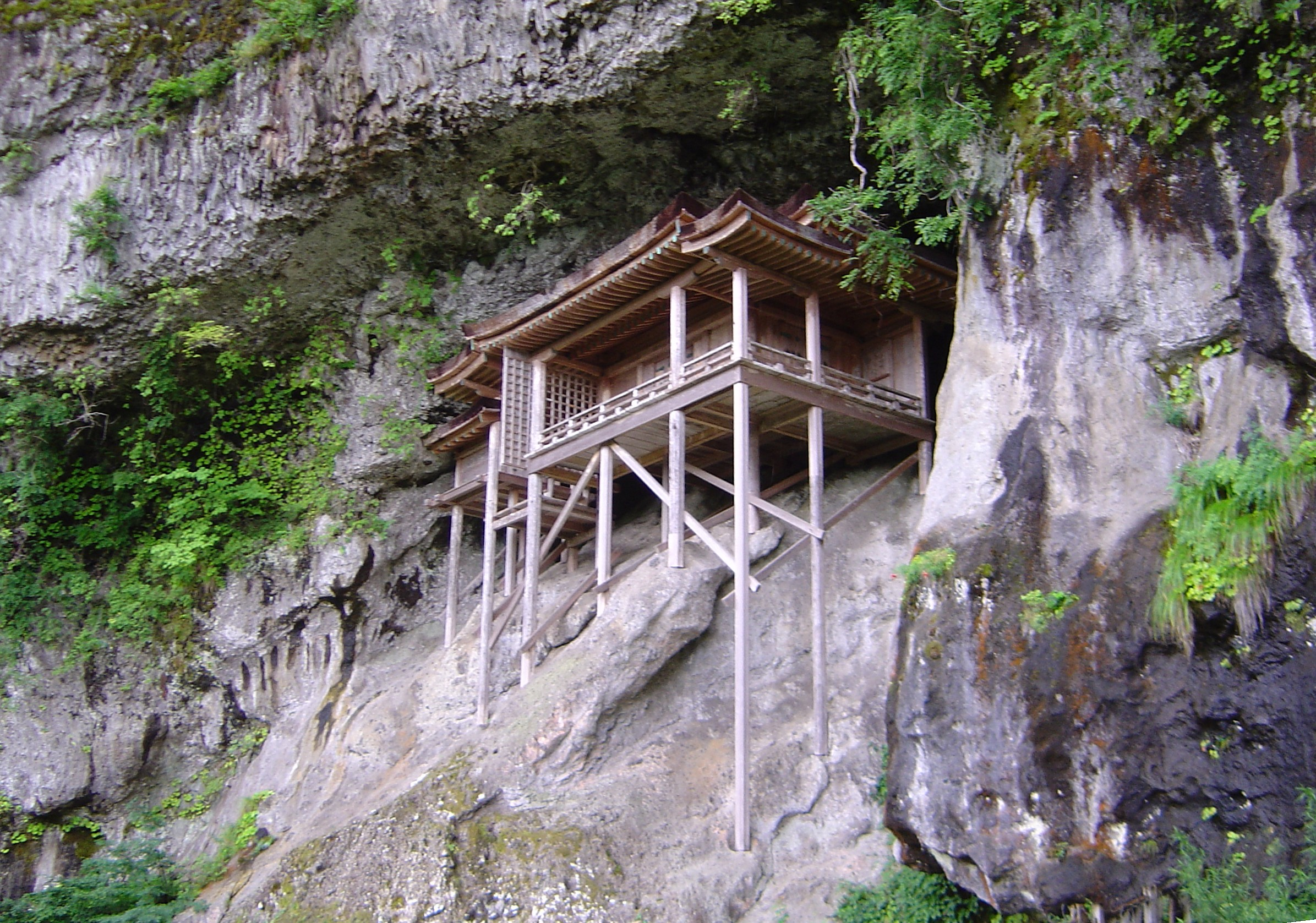
Sanbutsu-ji

Misasa (三朝町, Misasa-chō) is a town located in Tōhaku District, Tottori Prefecture, Japan. As of 31 December 2022, the town had an estimated population of 6,056 in 2520 households and a population density of 26 persons per km^{2}. The total area of the town is 233.52 square kilometres (90.16 sq mi). The name "Misasa" (literally "three mornings") originates from the belief that one who stays to enjoy three mornings in the town's famous hot springs will find all of his ailments cured.

== Geography ==
Misasa is located in central Tottori Prefecture. It is designated as a heavy snowfall area, and much of the area within the town is mountainous. The Tenjin River flows through the town.

=== Neighboring municipalities ===
Okayama Prefecture

- Kagamino
- Maniwa

Tottori Prefecture

- Kurayoshi
- Tottori
- Yurihama

== Climate ==
Misasa is classified as a humid subtropical climate (Köppen Cfa) characterized by warm summers and cold winters with heavy snowfall. The average annual temperature in Misasa is 13.2 °C. The average annual rainfall is 2097 mm with September as the wettest month. The temperatures are highest on average in August, at around 24.7 °C, and lowest in January, at around 2.4 °C.

== Demography ==
Per Japanese census data, the population of Misasa has been as follows. The population has been declining since the 1960s.

Historical population
Year	Pop.	±%
1920	10,423	—
1930	10,164	−2.5%
1940	9,715	−4.4%
1950	11,172	+15.0%
1960	10,951	−2.0%
1970	9,157	−16.4%
1980	8,771	−4.2%
1990	8,700	−0.8%
2000	7,921	−9.0%
2010	7,024	−11.3%

== History ==
As with all of Hōki Province, the area was part of the holdings of a branch of the Ikeda clan, daimyō of Tottori Domain under the Edo period Tokugawa shogunate. Following the Meiji restoration, the area was organized into villages within Tōhaku District, Tottori Prefecture on April 1, 1896, including the village of Misasa. Misasa was raised to town status on November 1, 1953.

== Government ==
Misasa has a mayor-council form of government with a directly elected mayor and a unicameral town council of 12 members. Misasa, collectively with the other municipalities of Tōhaku District, contributes three members to the Tottori Prefectural Assembly. In terms of national politics, the town is part of Tottori 1st district of the lower house of the Diet of Japan.

== Economy ==
Misasa is for the most part a spa resort, boasting springs of radium-rich water, exhausting radon, a radioactive gas. Locals believe that bathing one in such waters can be good for one's health, although there is no scientific consensus on whether doing so is detrimental or helpful to one's health (see Radiation hormesis). For this reason, the town of Misasa organizes a yearly Marie Curie festival – Marie Curie discovered radium.

== Education ==
Misasa has one public elementary school and one public junior high schools operated by the town government. The town does not have a high school. The Institute for Planetary Materials Okayama University is located in the town.

== Transportation ==
=== Railway ===
Misasa does not have any passenger railway service. The closest station is Kurayoshi Station on the JR West San'in Main Line.

=== Highways ===
- National Route 179
- National Route 482

== Sister cities ==
- Lamalou-les-Bains, France, since 1990
- Jōyō, Kyoto, Japan, since 2012

== Local attractions ==
- Misasa Onsen

A radium-rich hot spring.

- Oshika Valley

It is named a special location, or "meishou" (名所) by the government, and is about 4 km long.

- Sanbutsu-ji

A temple located on a cliff on the north face of Mount Mitoku, it is designated as one of the National Treasures of Japan.

== In popular culture ==
- The film Koitanibashi was shot in Misasa.

== Notable people from Misasa ==
- Eriko Yamaguchi, women's professional shogi player
