= Tottori Prefectural Museum =

- 鳥取県立博物館
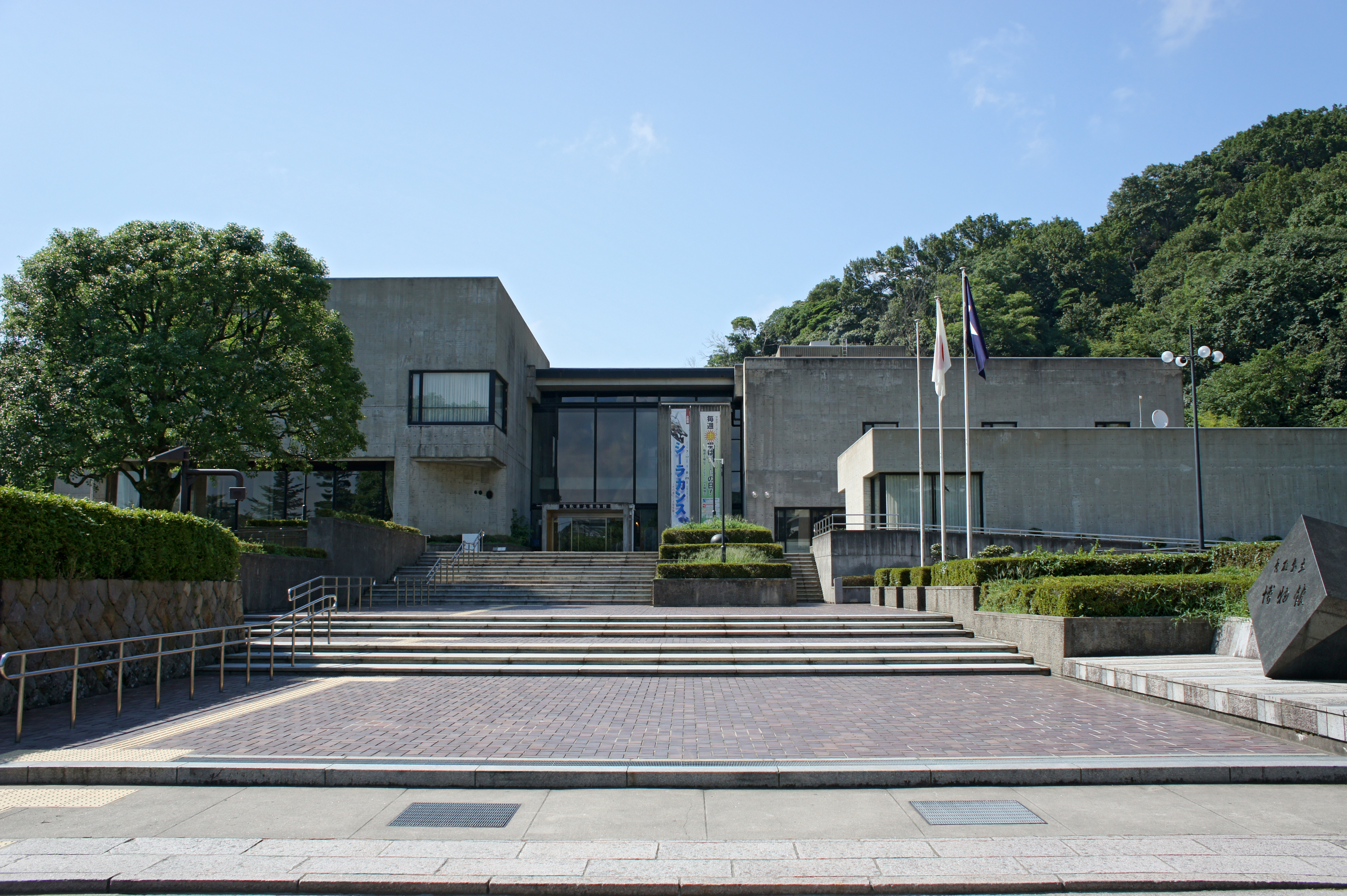
- Interactive map of the Tottori Prefectural Museum area

General information
- Location: 2-124, Higashi-machi, Tottori, Tottori Prefecture, Japan
- Coordinates: 35°30′30″N 134°14′10″E
- Opened: 1 October 1972

Website
- homepage

The Tottori Prefectural Museum (鳥取県立博物館, Tottori Kenritsu Hakubutsukan) is a museum in Tottori, Japan, dedicated to the nature, history, folklore, and art of Tottori Prefecture. Its permanent collection includes over three thousand items, and the museum also hosts temporary exhibitions.

== See also ==
- Tottori City Historical Museum
- Inaba Province
- Hōki Province
