= Iwami, Tottori =

Iwami 岩美町
- Town
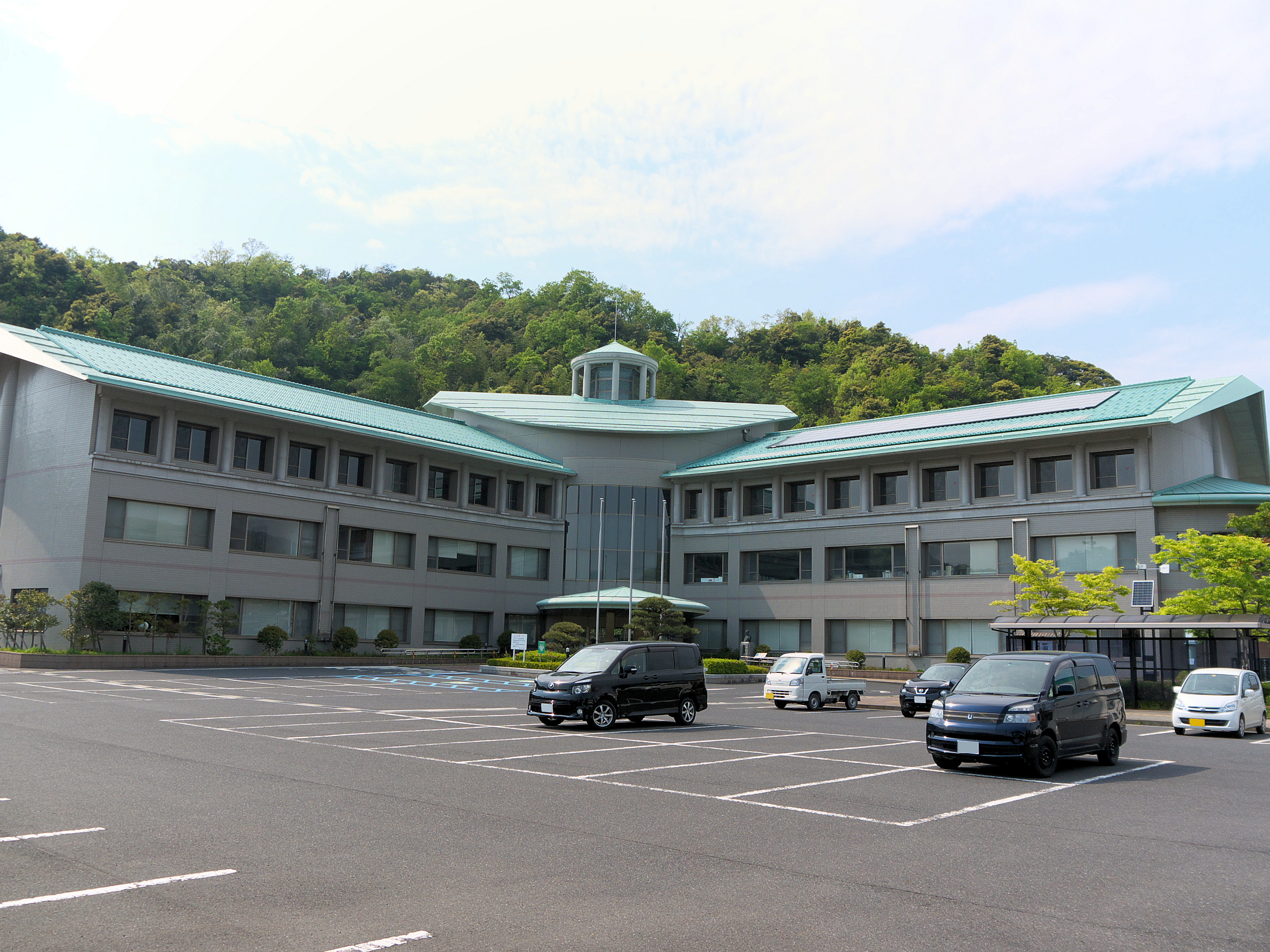
- Iwami Town Office

- Flag Emblem
- Interactive map of Iwami
- Location in Japan
- Coordinates: 35°35′N 134°20′E
- Country: Japan
- Region: Chūgoku; San'in
- Prefecture: Tottori
- District: Iwami

Area
  - Total: 122.32 km^{2} (47.23 sq mi)

Population (December 1, 2022)
  - Total: 10,998
  - Density: 89.912/km^{2} (232.87/sq mi)
- Time zone: UTC+09:00 (JST)
- City hall address: 675-1 Uradome, Iwami-chō, Tottori-ken 681-8501
- Climate: Cfa
- Website: Official website
- Symbols
- Flower: Iris
- Tree: Pine

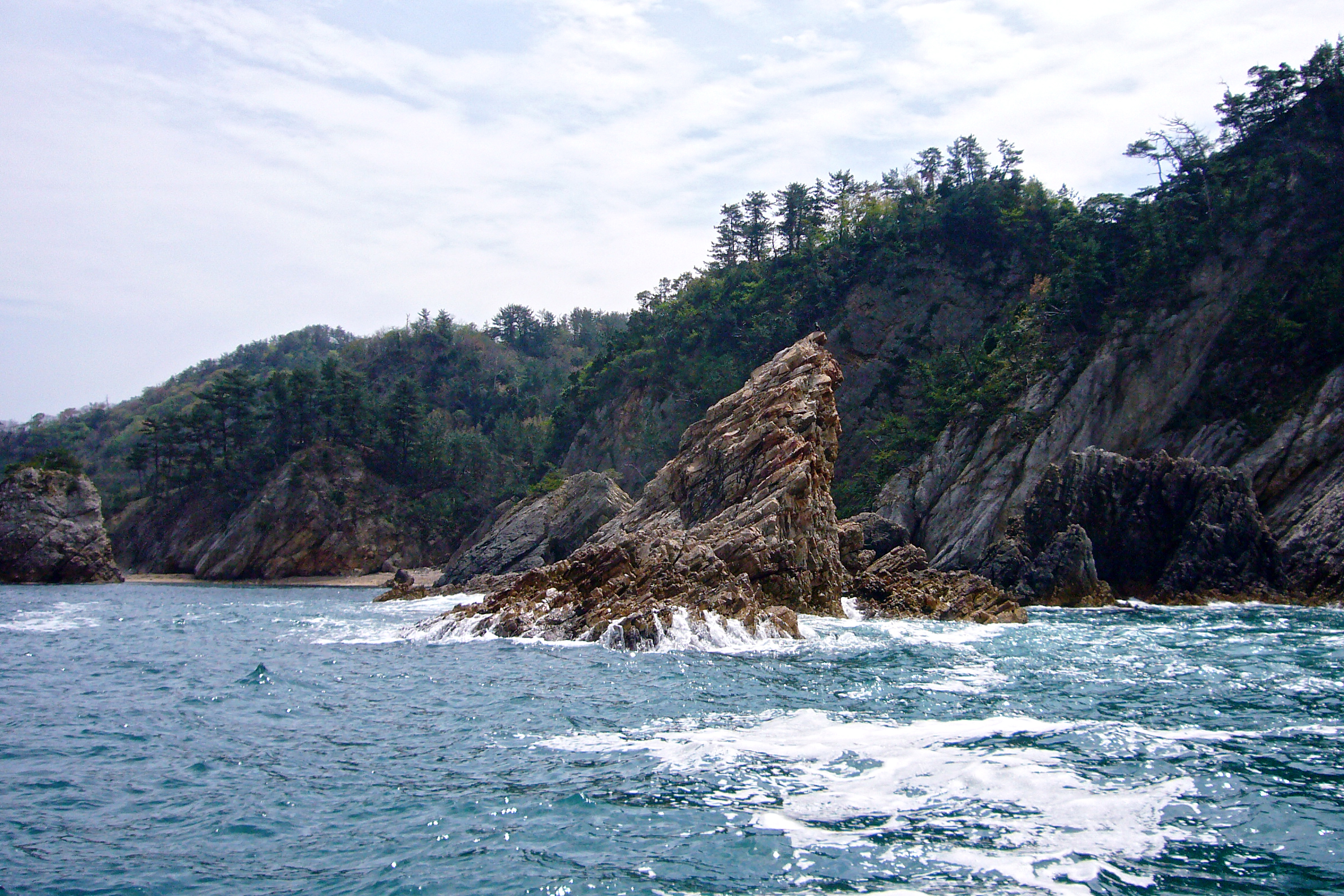
Uradome Coast

Iwami (岩美町, Iwami-chō) is a town located in Iwami District, Tottori Prefecture, Japan. As of 1 December 2022, the town had an estimated population of 10,998 in 4429 households and a population density of 90 persons per km^{2}. The total area of the town is 122.32 square kilometres (47.23 sq mi). Iwami lies entirely within the San'in Kaigan Geopark. Iwami is San'in Kaigan's biggest international beach resort.

== Geography ==
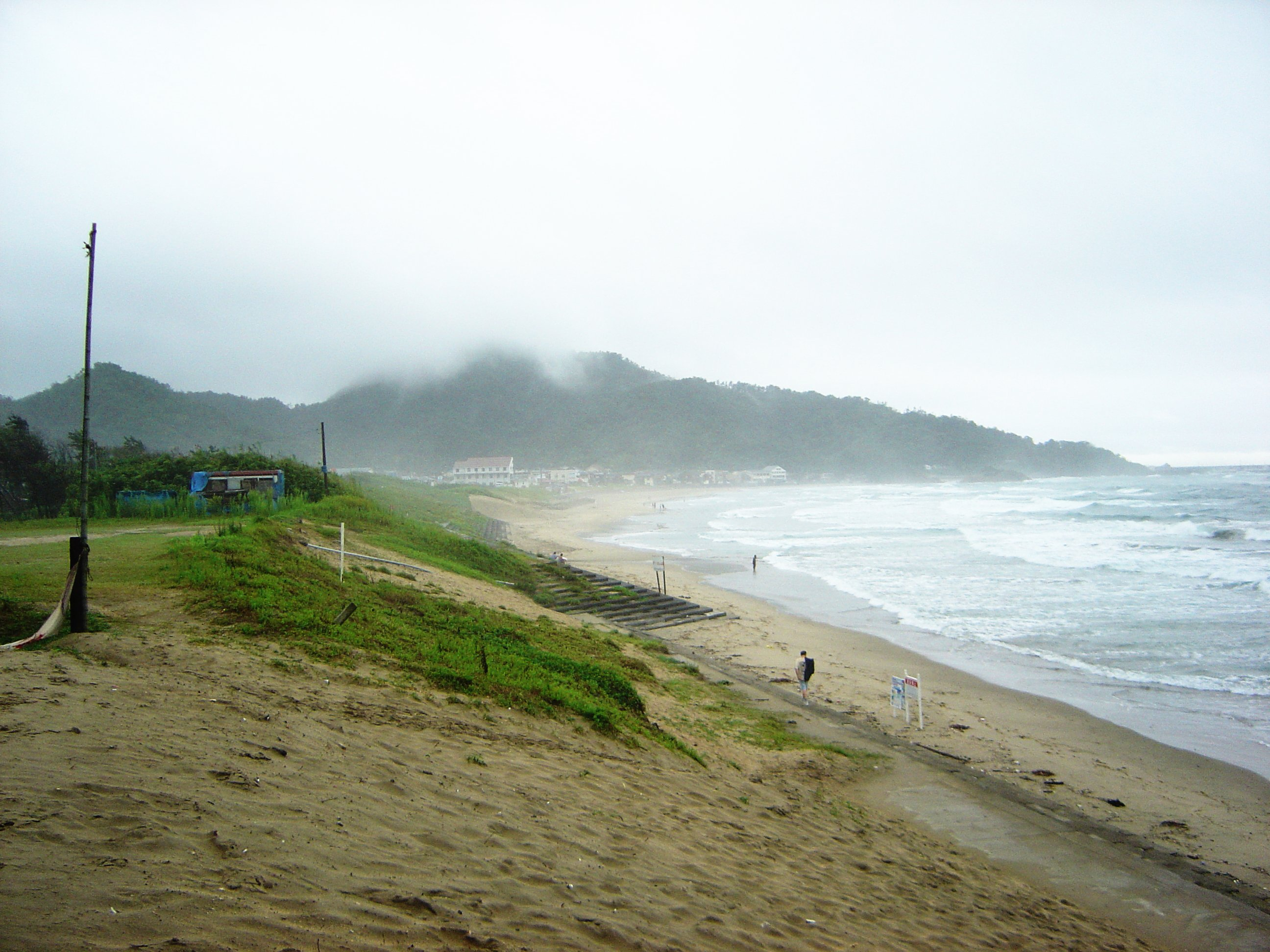
Iwami beach front following a close encounter with a typhoon.

Located in eastern Tottori, Iwami faces the Sea of Japan to the north. The surrounding landscape is dominated by low-lying hills and slopes; much of the built town and residential areas are located in flatter land between the heights. The north of the town borders onto Uradome Beach, though much of the rest of the coast consists of rough rocky outcrops and small inlets and bays. 15 km of this, collectively known as the Uradome Coast, is part of the Sanin Kaigan National Park. The Gamō River runs through the centre of the town. Iwami is around 30 minutes by train from the prefectural capital of Tottori City, and is the third stop by train heading east on the Tottori-Hamasaka line. Hyōgo Prefecture and Iwami's sister town of Shin'onsen are relatively nearby as well.

Weather in Iwami can be quite changeable, with summer temperatures peaking at over 30 degrees Celsius in August and dropping as low as -2 degrees in January and February. Whilst relatively tectonically stable for Japan, the area is prone to the occasional typhoon during the season.

=== Neighbouring municipalities ===
Hyōgo Prefecture

- Shin'onsen

Tottori Prefecture

- Tottori

=== Climate ===
Iwami has a humid subtropical climate (Köppen Cfa) characterized by warm, wet summers and cold winters with heavy snowfall. The average annual temperature in Iwami is 14.2 °C (57.6 °F). The average annual rainfall is 2,197.5 mm (86.52 in) with December as the wettest month. The temperatures are highest on average in August, at around 25.8 °C (78.4 °F), and lowest in January, at around 3.7 °C (38.7 °F). Its record high is 37.6 °C (99.7 °F), reached on 22 August 2018, and its record low is −8.5 °C (16.7 °F), reached on 9 February 2018.

Climate data for Iwami (1991−2020 normals, extremes 1978−present)
Month	Jan	Feb	Mar	Apr	May	Jun	Jul	Aug	Sep	Oct	Nov	Dec	Year
Record high °C (°F)	19.5 (67.1)	22.4 (72.3)	28.3 (82.9)	31.5 (88.7)	31.4 (88.5)	34.3 (93.7)	37.1 (98.8)	37.6 (99.7)	36.1 (97.0)	32.7 (90.9)	26.5 (79.7)	23.1 (73.6)	37.6 (99.7)
Mean daily maximum °C (°F)	7.6 (45.7)	8.4 (47.1)	12.3 (54.1)	18.1 (64.6)	22.9 (73.2)	25.7 (78.3)	29.5 (85.1)	31.0 (87.8)	26.8 (80.2)	21.7 (71.1)	16.4 (61.5)	10.6 (51.1)	19.3 (66.7)
Daily mean °C (°F)	3.7 (38.7)	4.0 (39.2)	6.9 (44.4)	12.0 (53.6)	16.9 (62.4)	20.8 (69.4)	24.9 (76.8)	25.8 (78.4)	21.8 (71.2)	16.3 (61.3)	11.2 (52.2)	6.2 (43.2)	14.2 (57.6)
Mean daily minimum °C (°F)	0.3 (32.5)	0.0 (32.0)	1.7 (35.1)	5.9 (42.6)	11.1 (52.0)	16.5 (61.7)	21.1 (70.0)	21.7 (71.1)	17.8 (64.0)	11.8 (53.2)	6.7 (44.1)	2.3 (36.1)	9.7 (49.5)
Record low °C (°F)	−6.4 (20.5)	−8.5 (16.7)	−5.5 (22.1)	−2.4 (27.7)	2.2 (36.0)	6.6 (43.9)	11.4 (52.5)	14.5 (58.1)	7.9 (46.2)	2.3 (36.1)	−0.2 (31.6)	−6.8 (19.8)	−8.5 (16.7)
Average precipitation mm (inches)	225.1 (8.86)	153.5 (6.04)	149.9 (5.90)	114.4 (4.50)	136.8 (5.39)	161.2 (6.35)	202.3 (7.96)	137.9 (5.43)	265.4 (10.45)	186.3 (7.33)	199.8 (7.87)	271.4 (10.69)	2,197.5 (86.52)
Average precipitation days (≥ 1.0 mm)	21.9	16.4	14.5	11.3	10.7	11.3	12.6	10.2	13.3	12.1	15.9	20.6	170.8
Mean monthly sunshine hours	54.8	76.4	132.5	182.2	205.0	153.6	168.7	207.9	139.6	142.8	100.3	66.9	1,627.7
Source: Japan Meteorological Agency

== Demographics ==
Per Japanese census data, the population of Iwami has been decreased steadily since the 1950s.

Historical population
Year	Pop.	±%
1920	17,121	—
1930	17,672	+3.2%
1940	16,474	−6.8%
1950	20,519	+24.6%
1960	19,350	−5.7%
1970	16,817	−13.1%
1980	15,969	−5.0%
1990	15,342	−3.9%
2000	14,015	−8.6%
2010	12,324	−12.1%

== History ==
The area of Iwami was part of ancient Inaba Province. During the Edo period, the area was part of the holdings of Tottori Domain ruled by a branch of the Ikeda clan from their seat at Tottori Castle. Iwami District, Tottori was established after the Meiji restoration and divided into several villages with the creation of the modern municipalities system on April 1, 1896. The town of Iwami was established on July 1, 1954, by the merger of two towns (Uradome and Iwai) and seven villages.

== Government ==
Iwami has a mayor-council form of government with a directly elected mayor and a unicameral town council of twelve members. Iwami contributes one member to the Tottori Prefectural Assembly. In terms of national politics, the town is part of Tottori 1st district of the lower house of the Diet of Japan.

== Economy ==
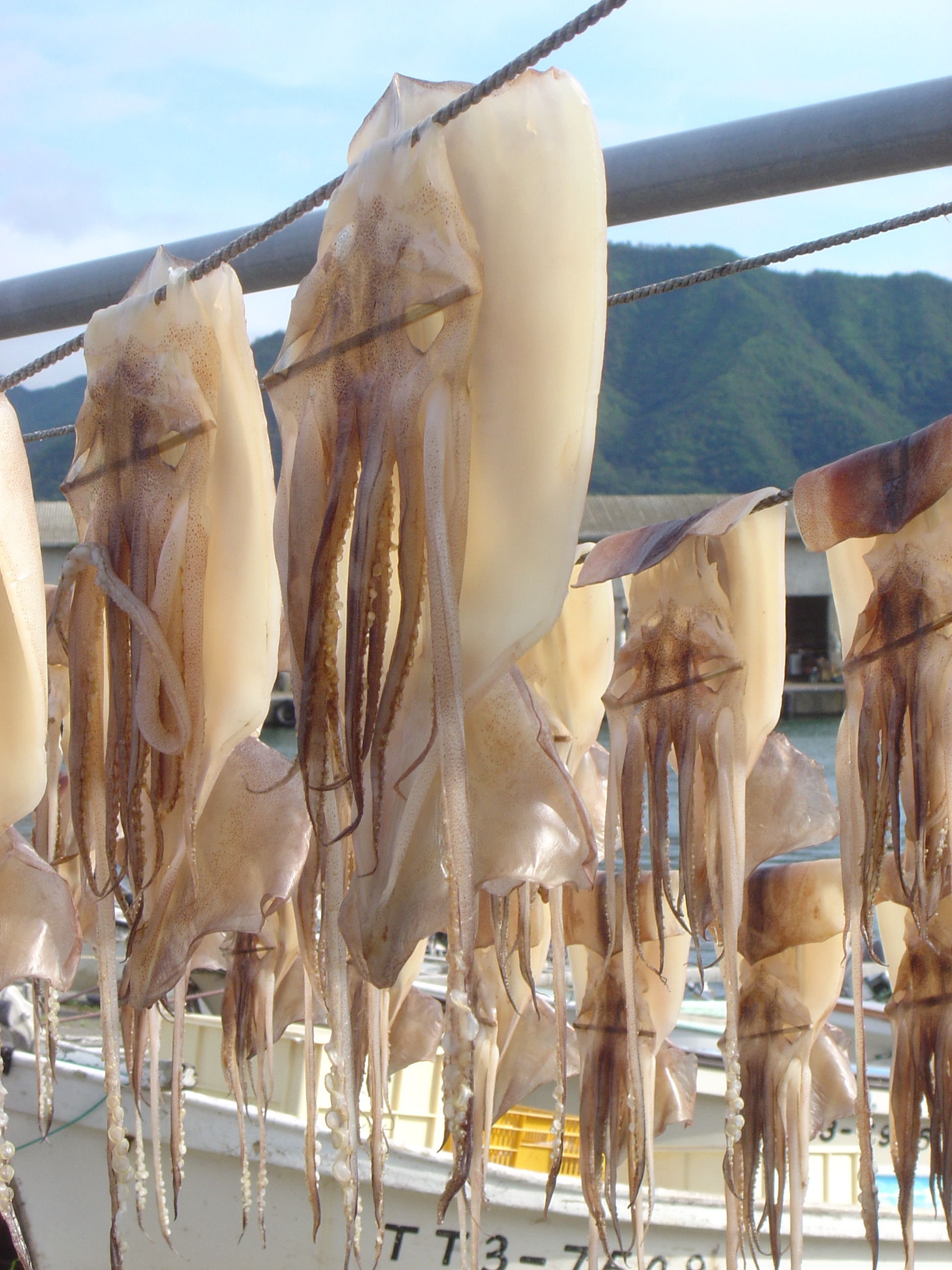
Squid drying in Iwami harbor

The majority of the town's working population is connected with the commercial fishing industry, notably squid fishing boats or aquaculture. Agriculture is also important, with the most common crop being rice. Iwami also has a locally renowned onsen (hot spring), the Iwai onsen.

== Education ==
Iwami has three public elementary schools and one junior high school operated by the town government, and one public high school operated by the Tottori Prefectural Board of Education.

== Transportation ==
=== Railway ===
JR West - San'in Main Line

- Higashihama - Iwami - Ōiwa

=== Highways ===
- San'in Kinki Expressway
- National Route 9
- National Route 178

== Sister cities ==
- Shin'onsen, Japan, since July 1, 1964
- Kunigami, Japan, since July 16, 2023

== Local attractions ==
- Iwai temple ruins, National Historic Site
- Iwami Onsen
- Uradome Coast, National Place of Scenic Beauty

== Culture ==
Iwami served as the model for the fictional town of Iwatobi, the setting for the anime series Free!. Iwami has used the series to promote tourism to the town.

== Noted people from Iwami ==
- Komakichi Matsuoka, politician
