= Tottori Sand Dunes =

Sand dunes in Tottori, Japan

Coordinates: 35°32′24″N 134°13′39″E

The Tottori Sand Dunes (鳥取砂丘, Tottori sakyū) are sand dunes located outside the city center of Tottori in Tottori Prefecture, Japan. With a length of 9 miles (14 km) and a width of less than 1.5 miles (2.4 km), it is the largest sand dune in Japan. The sand dunes are part of the San'in Kaigan Geopark, which is part of the UNESCO Global Geoparks.

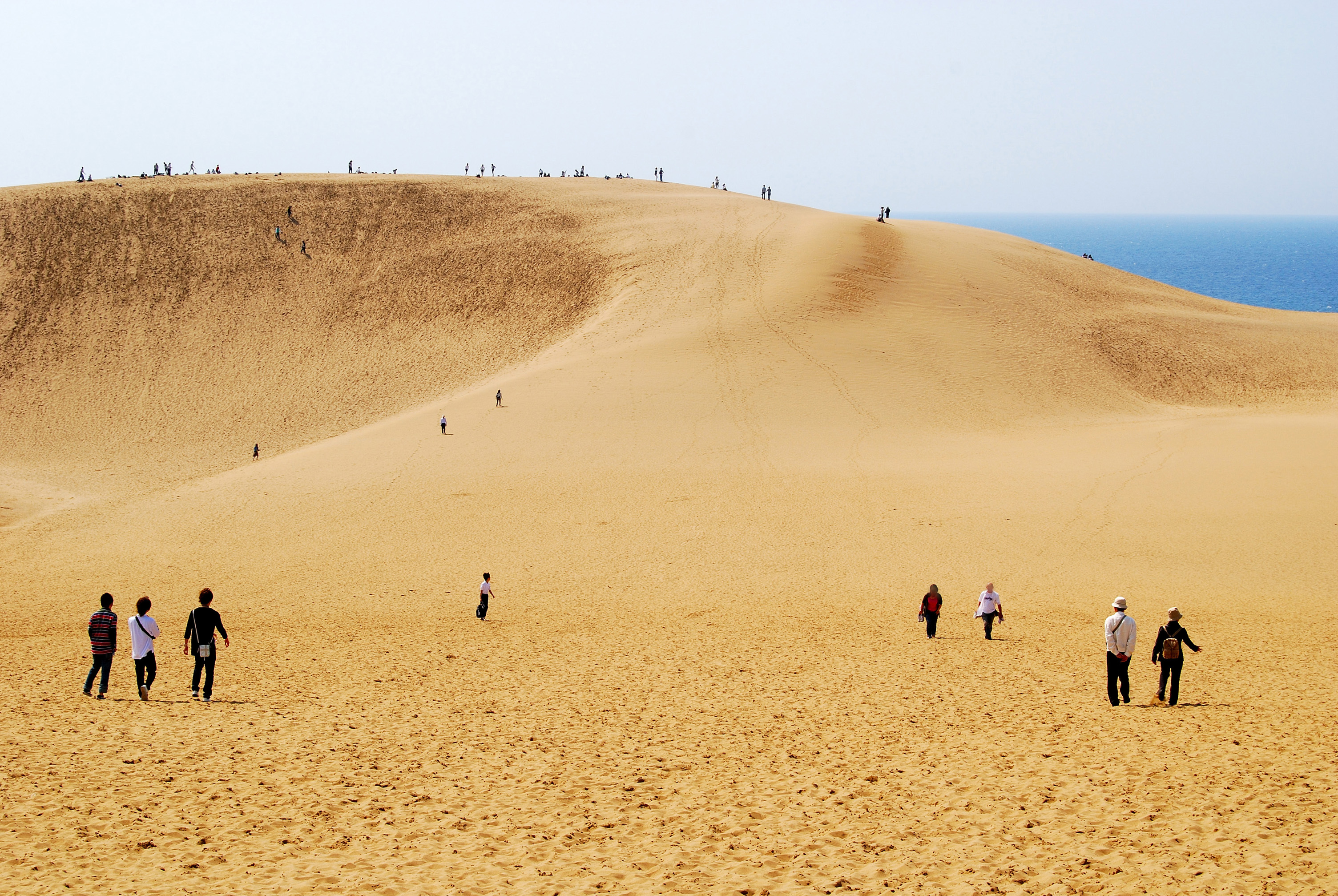
Tottori Sand Dunes

Video of the dunes

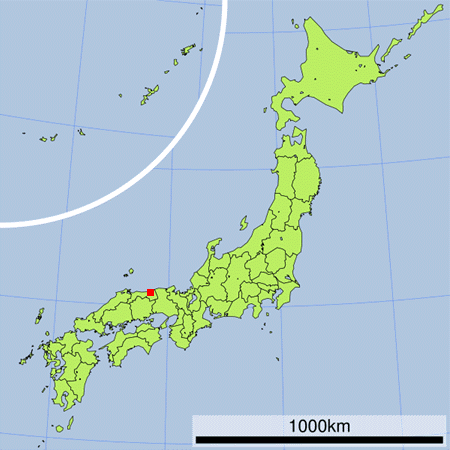
Location of the Tottori Sand Dunes

== History ==
The sand formations were created when sediment deposits carried from the Chūgoku Mountains by the Sendai River settled in the Sea of Japan. Strong winds then shaped the dunes over a span of 100,000 years.

The area of the dunes has been steadily decreasing due to a government reforestation program following World War II. Concrete barriers have been built along the coast to prevent the formations from eroding. Authorities have adopted measures to stop the shrinkage of the dunes, partly because they attract a significant amount of tourism to the area.

== Geological features ==
The Tottori Sand Dunes stretch from Iwato in Fukube-cho, Tottori City to Hakuto, Tottori City, on both sides of the Sendai River. However, the "Hamasaka Dunes" area of 545 hectares on the eastern side of the river is the most famous tourist destination. Lake Tanegaike, formed when the dunes separated it from the sea, lies to the southeast.

The maximum elevation difference reaches 90 meters, creating bowl-shaped depressions called "suribachi" (grinding bowls). The largest of these, sometimes called "Ō-suribachi" (large grinding bowl), rises to a height of 40 meters. On the slopes of these depressions, patterns resembling hanging blinds called "saren" can be seen where sand has collapsed in flowing patterns, alongside striped patterns called "fūmon" (wind ripples) formed by winds of approximately 5-6 meters per second. The surface is not always dry; at the deepest part of the suribachi, there is an area called an "oasis" where groundwater seeps out, sometimes forming a shallow pool during certain seasons.

== Graffiti incidents ==
The sand dunes have experienced problems with unauthorized markings and drawings. To address this ongoing issue, the "Ordinance to Protect and Nurture Japan's Premier Tottori Sand Dunes" was enacted on April 1, 2009, making such defacement punishable by fines of up to 50,000 yen.

== Gallery ==
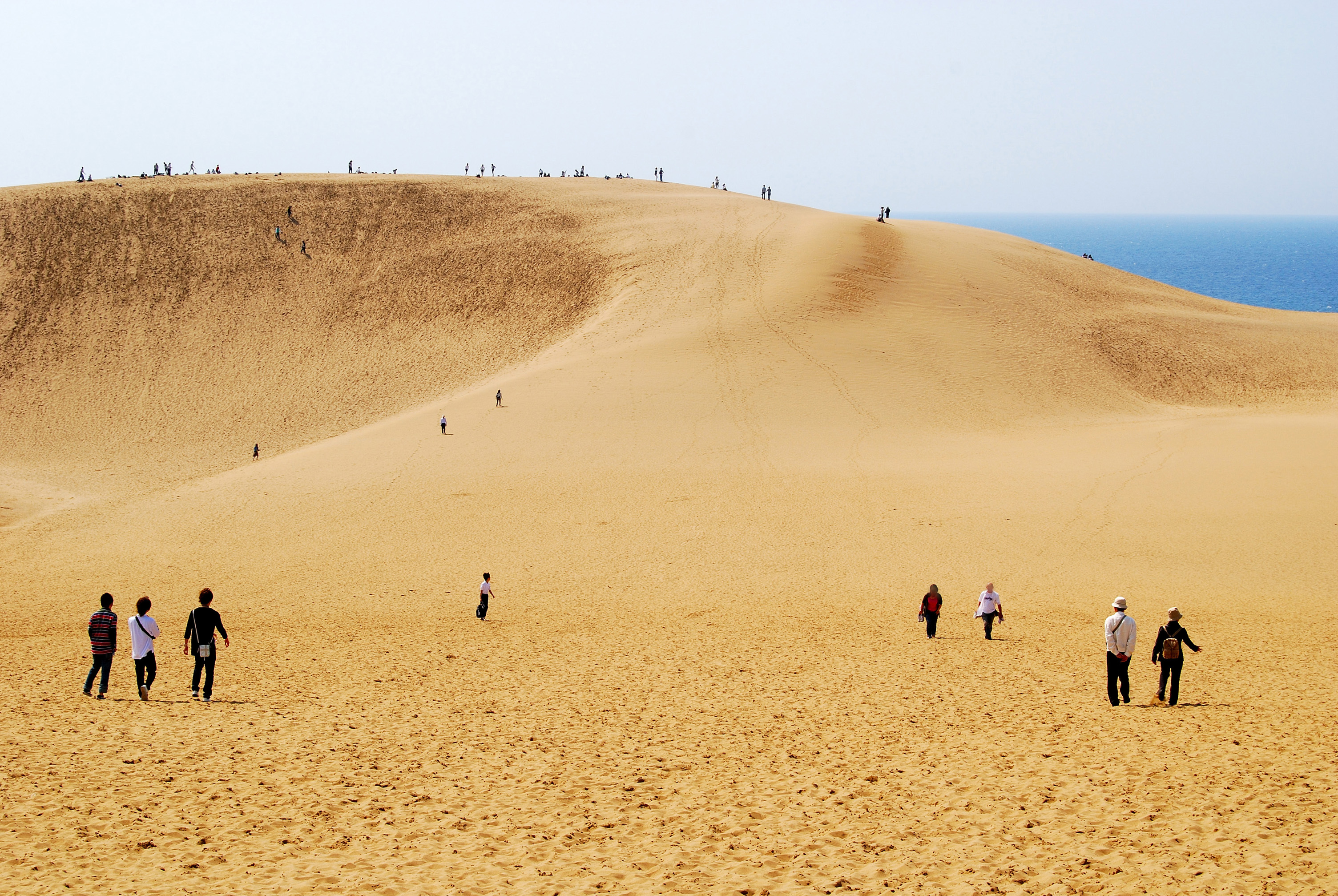
View from the biggest dune

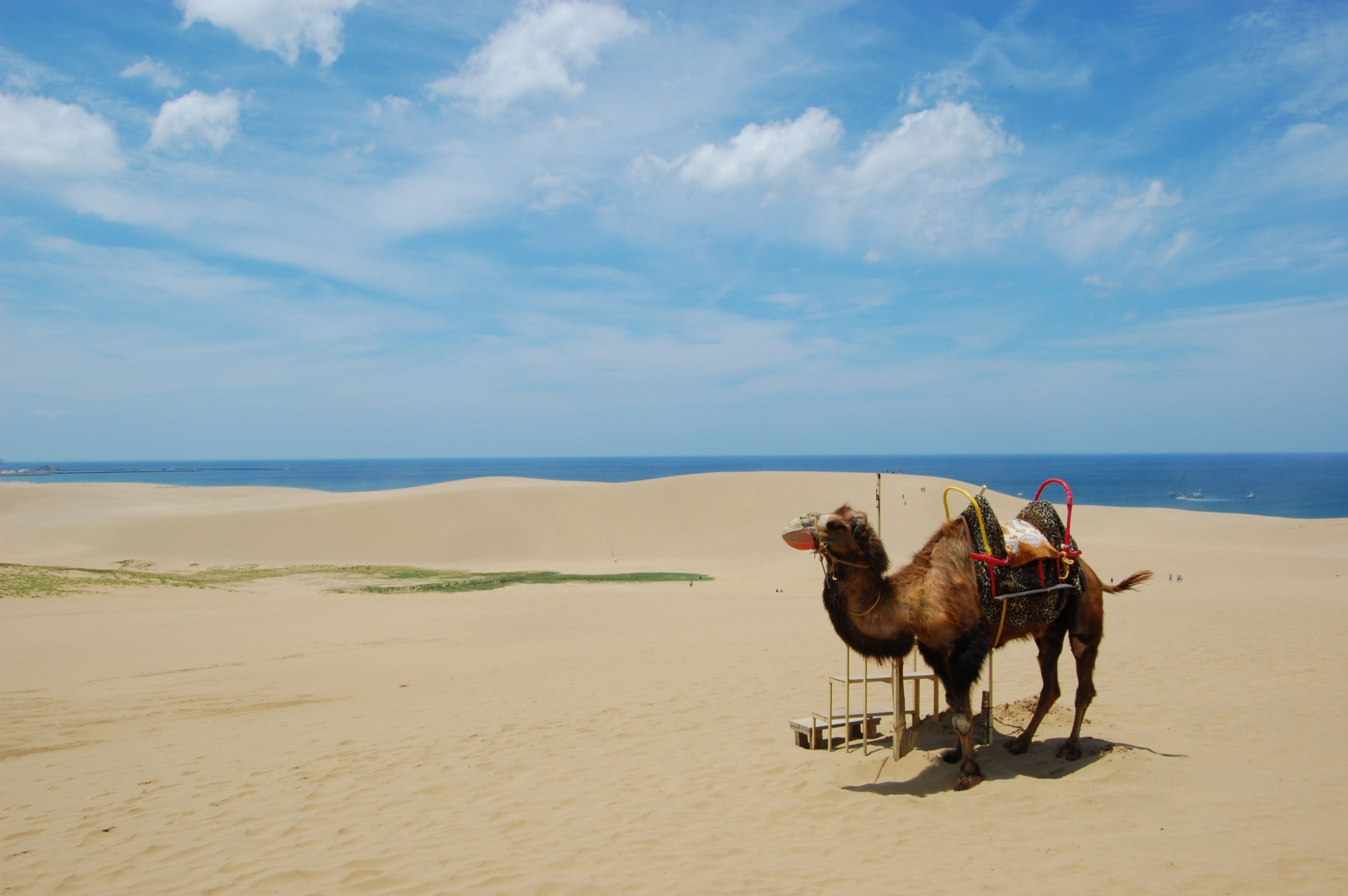
A camel for tourists

== See also ==
- Luna Terrace
- Nakatajima Sand Dunes
- Sarugamori Sand Dunes
- Tourism in Japan
