= Nezame no toko =

Scenic spot in Nagano, Japan

- IUCN category III (natural monument or feature)
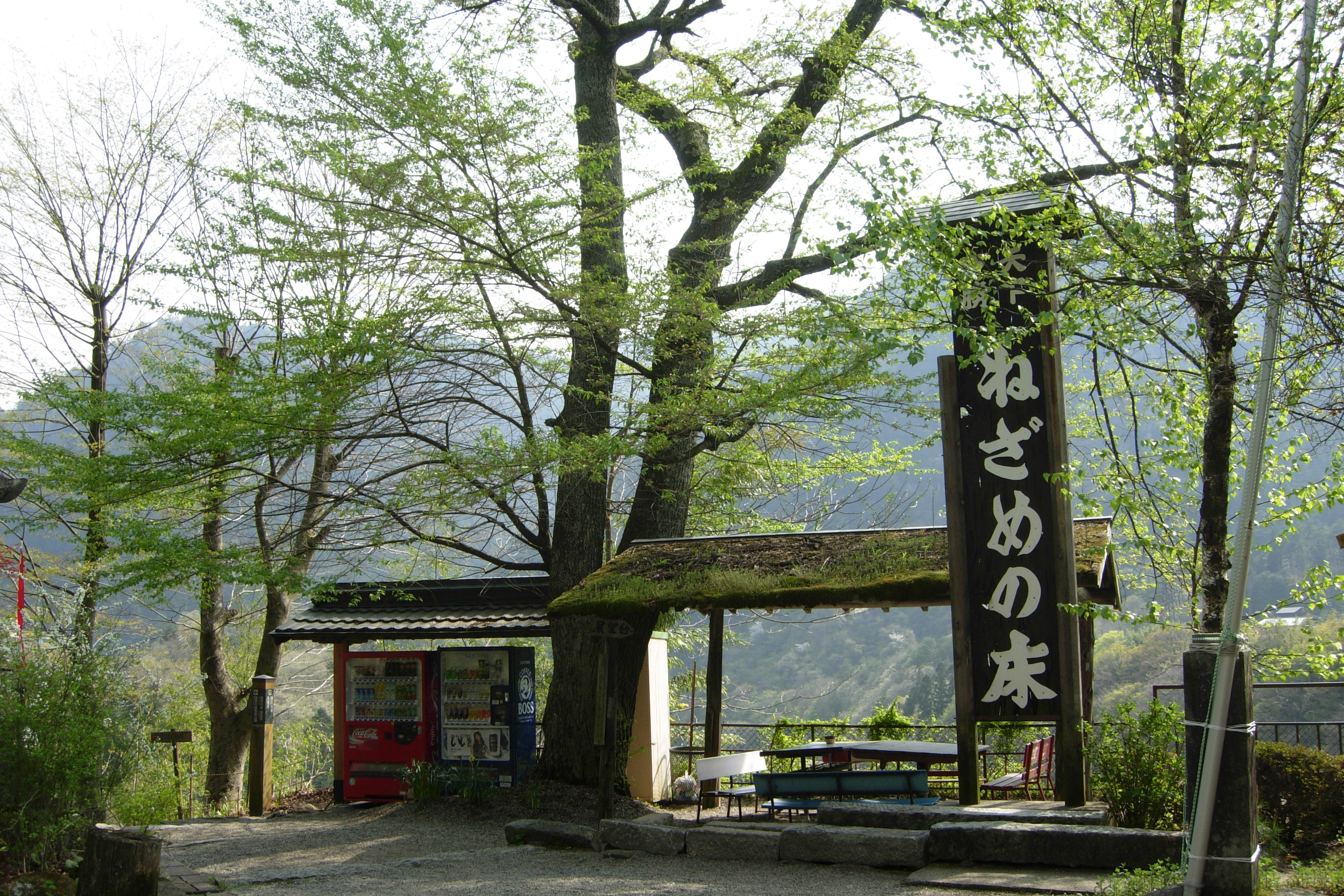
- Nezame no toko

- Location within Nagano Prefecture Location within Japan
- Location: Agematsu, Nagano, Japan
- Coordinates: 35°46′21.53″N 137°41′58.02″E
- Established: April 23, 1941

Nezame no toko (寝覚の床), meaning "Bed of Awakening" is a scenic spot in Japan, located in Agematsu, Kiso District, Nagano Prefecture. It is a nationally designated Place of Scenic Beauty.

== Overview ==
One onomatological explanation is that it was named "Bed of Awakening" because the stunning view stimulated even drowsy onlookers such that they would become wide awake. There are naturally occurring eroded granite rock formations here, and some of these are claimed to resemble the shapes of lions, lotus flower, etc.

Folk tradition claims that the name derives from Urashima Tarō experiencing an "awakening" here, that is, the sensation that everything in his life up to then was as if in a dream. (Note: Walter Weston wrote that Urashima, the Rip van Winkle of Japan had woken up from a long slumber, but Urashima did not enter such a long sleep as van Winkle did.)

It was selected as one of nationally designated places of scenic beauty in Nagano.

There used to be rapid currents that created the formation, but the water level has lowered due to such factors as the Kiso Dam upstream that came into operation in 1968, exposing more of the granite formation which used to be underwater.

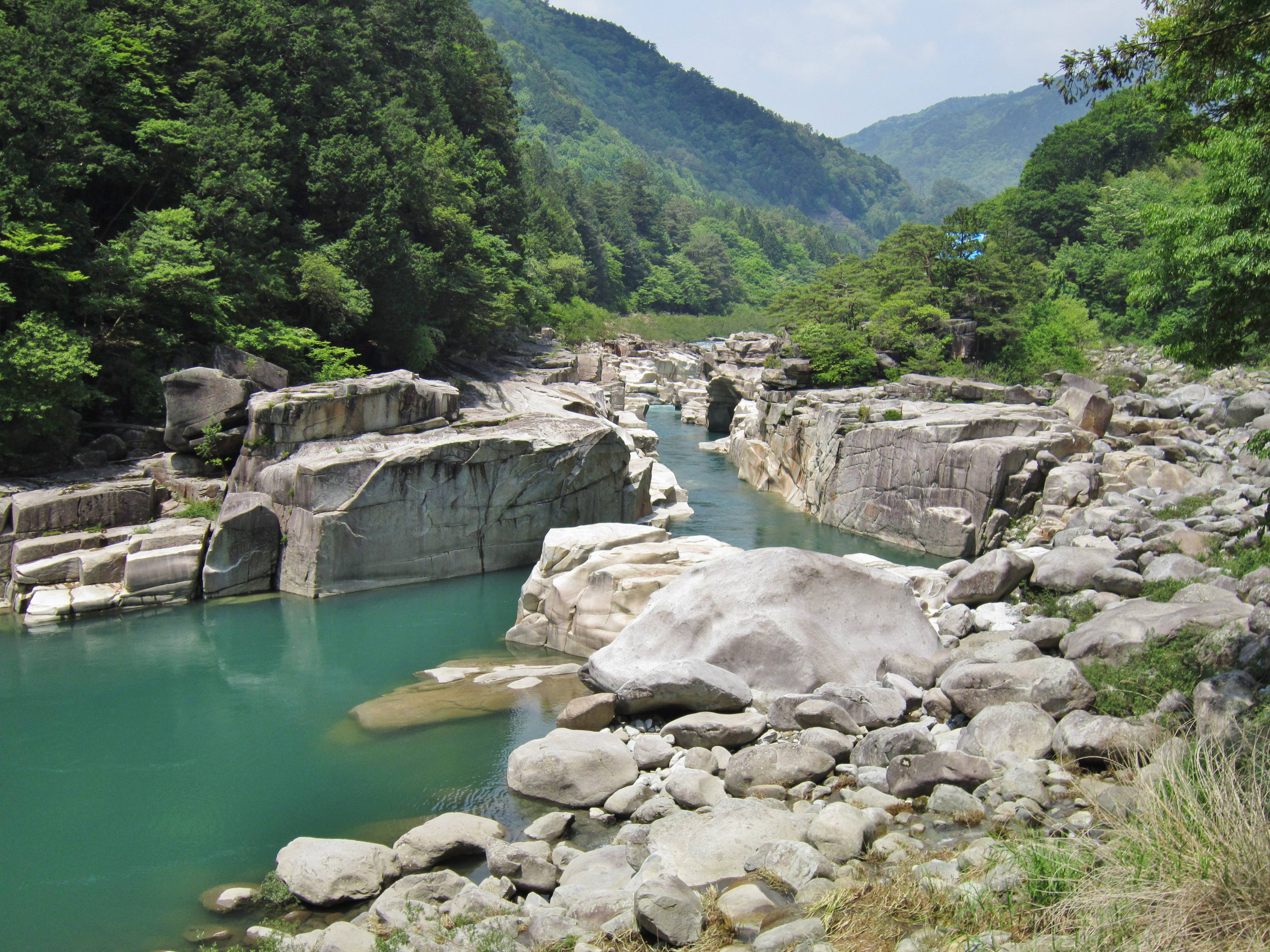
Kiso River and Nezame no toko

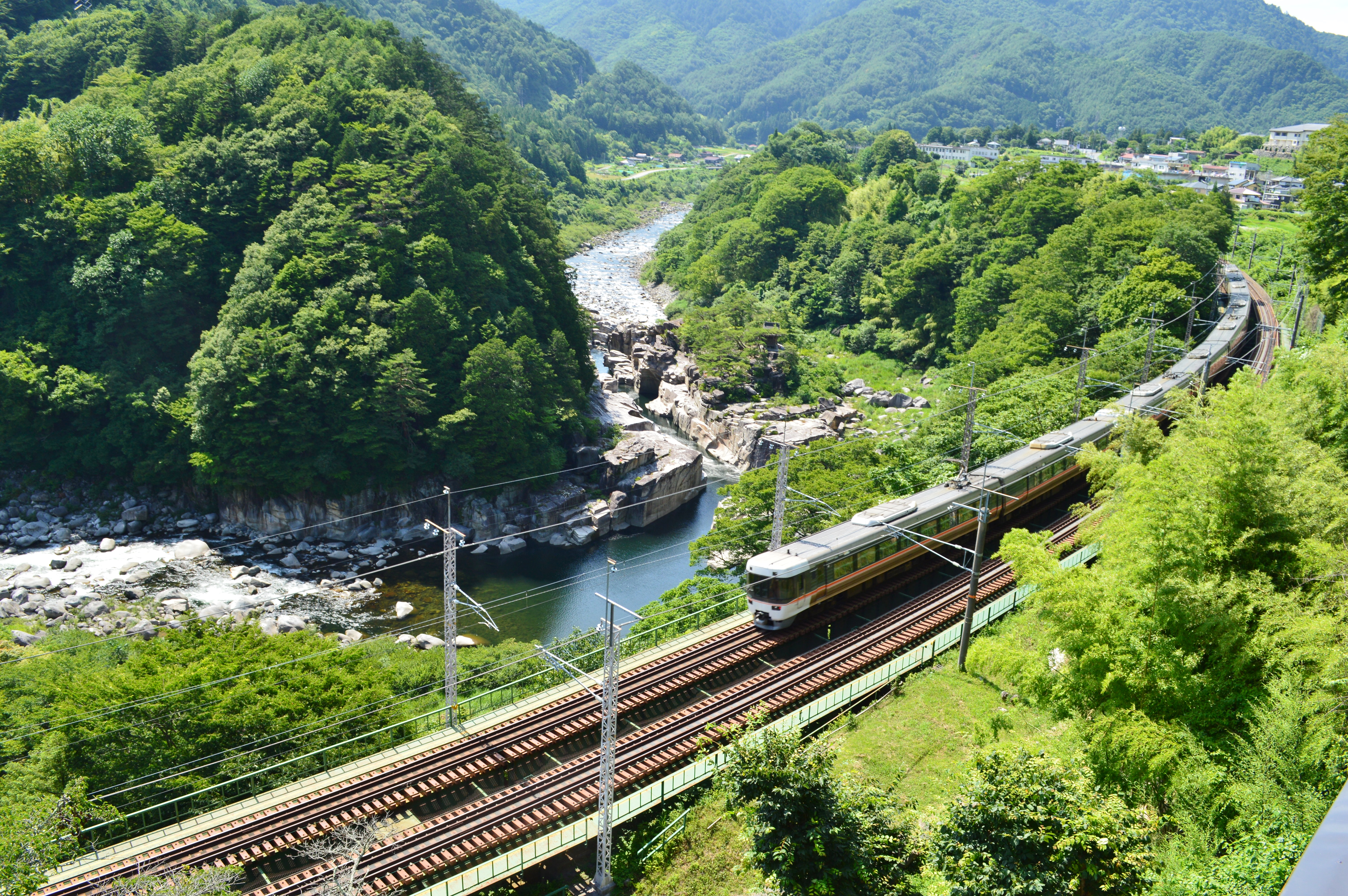
Nezame no toko and Chūō Main Line railway

== History ==
There have been waka poetry composed on the Kiso scenery while traveling the Nakasendō that employed "nezame" as keyword (utamakura).

=== Rinsenji ===
The Rinsen-ji in Agematsu stands on a cliff overlooking the strange rock formations of Nezame no toko. According to the engi (story of origin) of this temple, which stands nearby overlooking the scenery, Rinsenji originally enshrined the Benten statue which local legend said Urashima had left behind. (Note: Although the work is entitled Nezame Urashima-dera ryaku-engi which seems to be about a temple of a different name, the text explicitly declares the place was named "Nezame-yama Rinsen-ji",)

The temple totally burnt down in 1864, except for the Benten-dō, and rebuilt the following year. A new main hall, restored to its original appearance was erected in 1971. The surviving Benten-dō structure was completed 1712 under the auspices of Tokugawa Yoshimichi, fourth daimyō of the Owari Domain.

There is also the Urashima-dō, which is a distinctly separate structure. It has stood on top of the tokoiwa ("Bed Rock").

The temple's treasure hall houses a fishing pole, alleged to have belonged to Urashima.

== Mikaeri no okina ==
According to folk tradition, there resided in the hamlet of Nezame an old man named Mikaeri no okina (三返りの翁) who provided wonder-medicine to the folk.

The Noh play Nezame (寝覚) from the late Muromachi Period (Note: There are records of this being performed in1595 and 1596, etc.) is based on this tradition.

In the Noh play, the Emperor of Japan during the Engi era hears of the elixir of longevity, and sends a messenger from court to investigate. The old man reveals himself to be an avatar of the Yakushi Nyorai, calling himself "Medicine-master" (医王仏, Iwō-butsu), and presents the medicine. It is explained that he has lived at Nezame no toko for a thousand years, and has rejuvenated himself three times with the medicine, earning the name Mikaeri meaning "thrice reverted".

== Urashima Tarō legend ==
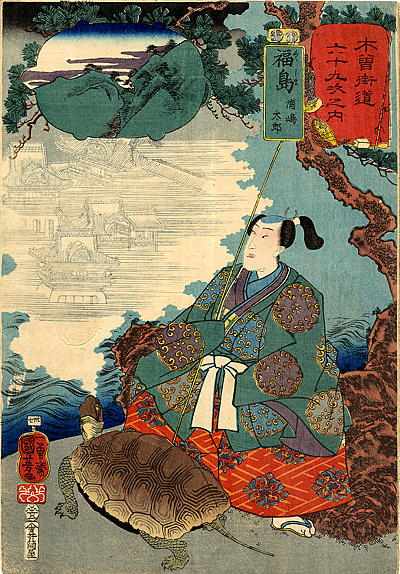
Urashima Tarō and turtle at Fukushima-juku station on the Kiso-kaidō path. (Note: It is actually six-miles south of Fukushima that Agematsu, the nearest station to Nezame no toko is located. But the artist is nevertheless alluding to Nezame no toko.) ―Utagawa Kuniyoshi, Fukushima-juku, 69 stations of the Kiso-kaidō).

Although this is in the mountainous terrain of Kiso and far from any ocean, there has arisen a local tradition associating the spot with Urashima Tarō, the man who went to the Dragon Palace beyond the sea.

One of the oldest known records indicating local association of this scenic spot with Urashima Tarō is the mention of the so-called Urashima-ga-tsuri-ishi ("Urashima's fishing stone") by Zen priest Takuan in his travelogue Kisoji kikō ki.

Kaibara Ekken also says in his Kisoji no ki (1685) that he witnessed the "Nezame no toko where Urashima fished", but he is skeptical about Urashima ever visiting this area.

According to the Nezame Urashima-dera ryaku-engi (寝覚浦嶋寺略縁起) or story of the founding of Rinsen-ji, Urashima Tarō had returned from the Dragon Palace (Ryūgū-jō) with three gifts: the "jeweled hand box" (tamatebako), a Benzaiten statue, and a book of knowledge entitled the Manpōshinsho (万宝神書). After traveling various parts of Japan, he settled in a beautiful village by Kiso River. He lived here many years fishing for leisure, while peddling the medicine he had learned to conjure using the esoteric book. One day while storytelling to the villagers about the Dragon Palace, he opened his box, and turned into a 300-year-old man. On the 1st year of Tenkei (938) he disappeared from the face of the earth.

The Ryaku-engi has gone through many reprints, with the oldest surviving being the revised print of 1756, (Note: At the point of Torii's paper, she thought the 1848 edition to be the oldest.) However, the gist of the legend is thought to have been established earlier, from the near-modern period.

From some point in local tradition, (Note: According to Torii, by the Genroku era (1688–1704).) The Mikaeri no okina and Urashima Tarō came to be seen as the same personage. The Ryaku-engii also states that Urashima earned the moniker 見かへりの翁 (Mikaeri no okina; "Old man of compensation") for being the provender of the magical drug to the villagers.

An old, pre-Takemoto jōruri called Urashima Tarō was written with this Agematsu area as its setting.

Basil Hall Chamberlain also described the monument off the route of the Nakasendō highway, near Suhara-juku station, and mentioned its association with Urashima, the Japanese Rip van Winkle.

== See also ==
- List of Places of Scenic Beauty of Japan (Nagano)
