= Tenryū-kyō =

- IUCN category III (natural monument or feature)
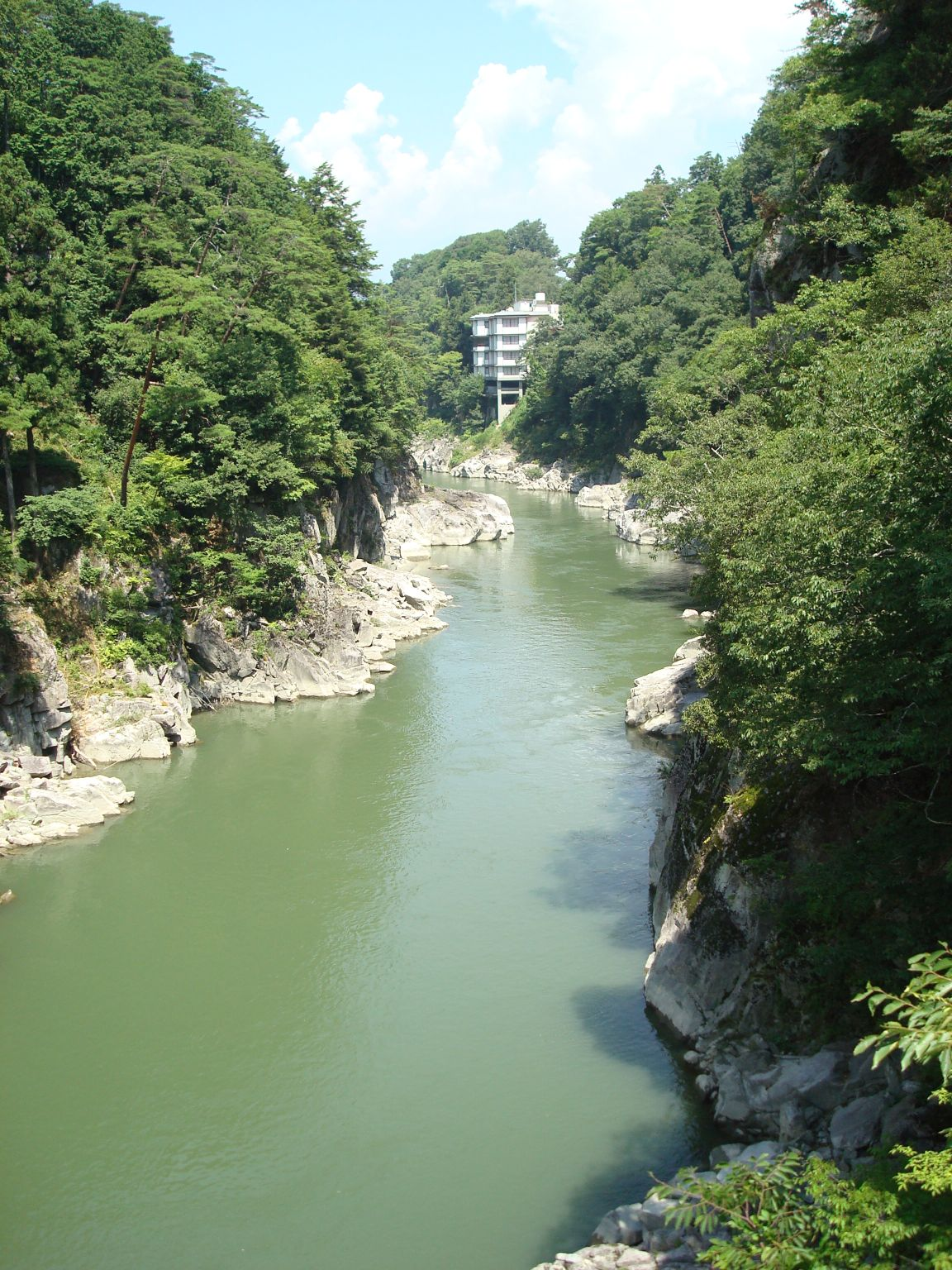
- typical panorama at Tenryū-kyō
- Interactive map of Tenryū-kyō
- Location: Iida, Nagano Prefecture, Japan
- Coordinates: 35°26′29″N 137°49′7″E

Tenryū Gorge (天竜峡, Tenryū-kyō) is a nationally designated nationally designated Place of Scenic Beauty in Iida, Nagano Prefecture, Japan. It is located within the Tenryū-Okumikawa Quasi-National Park. In 1927 it was selected as one of the 100 Landscapes of Japan.

The Tenryū Gorge is a popular sightseeing spot, noted for its ease of access, hot spring resorts, rafting trips on the river and its rugged, rocky scenery.

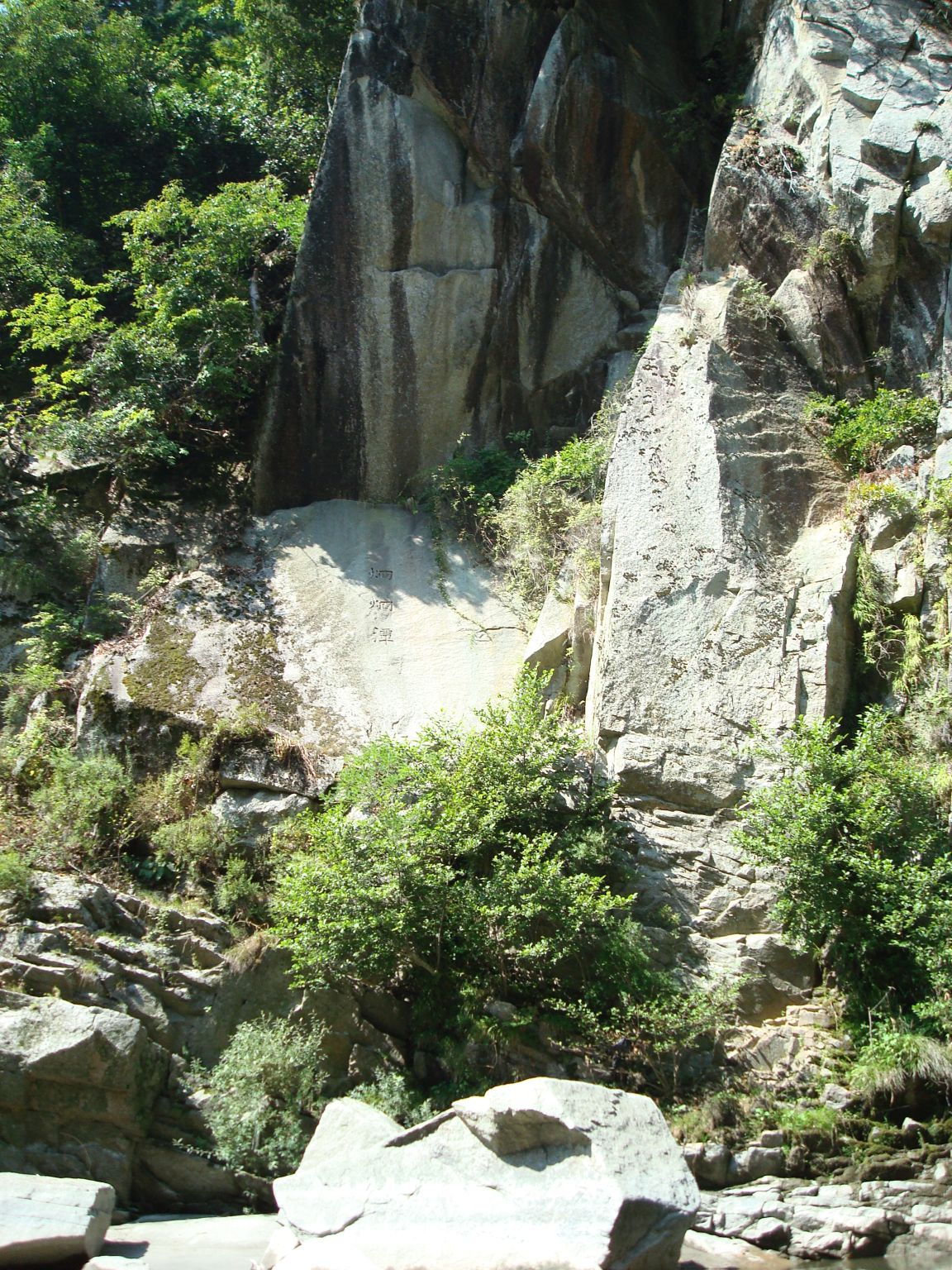

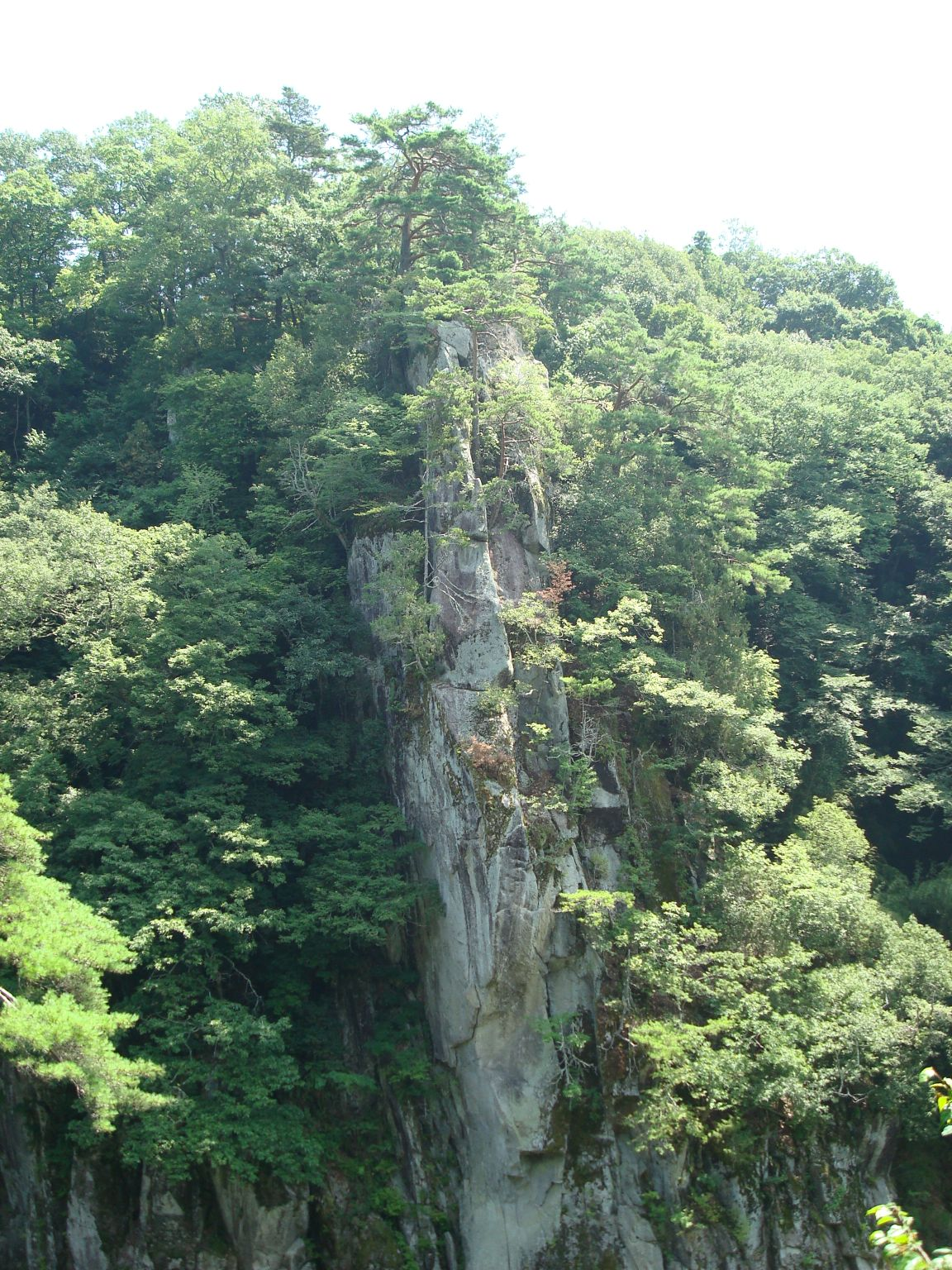

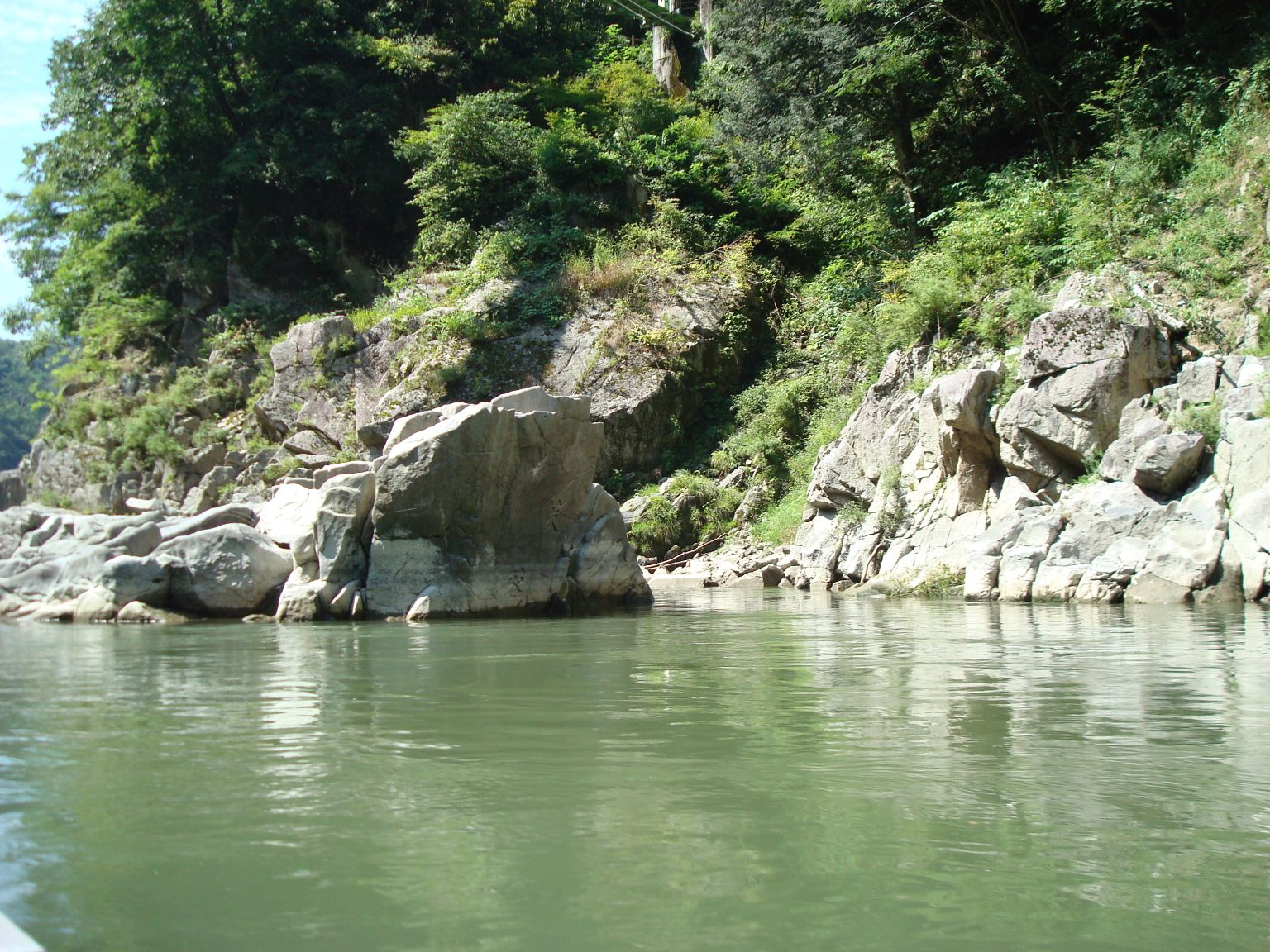

== See also ==
- List of Places of Scenic Beauty of Japan (Nagano)
