= List of places of scenic beauty of Japan (Nagano) =

This list is of the places of scenic beauty of Japan located within the Prefecture of Nagano.

== National Places of Scenic Beauty ==
As of 1 January 2021, six Places have been designated at a national level (including one *Special Place of Scenic Beauty).

Site	Municipality	Comments	Image	Coordinates	Type	Ref.
*Kamikōchi 上高地; Kamikōchi	Matsumoto	also a Special Natural Monument; within Chūbu-Sangaku National Park		36°16′59″N 137°40′31″E	6	
Kōzen-ji Gardens 光前寺庭園; Kōzenji teien	Komagane			35°44′06″N 137°53′47″E	1	
Nezame-no-toko 寝覚の床; Nezame-no-toko	Agematsu			35°46′10″N 137°41′57″E	6, 7	
Tenryū-kyō 天竜峡; Tenryū-kyō	Iida			35°26′14″N 137°49′07″E	5	
Mount Obasute 姨捨（田毎の月） Obasute (Tagoto-no-tsuki)	Chikuma			36°30′16″N 138°05′43″E	3, 4, 11	
Yonako Falls 米子瀑布群; Yonako bakufu-kun	Suzaka			36°39′04″N 138°18′24″E	6, 11	

== Prefectural Places of Scenic Beauty ==
As of 23 December 2020, six Places have been designated at a prefectural level.

Site	Municipality	Comments	Image	Coordinates	Type	Ref.
Omika Falls 御三甕の滝; Omika-no-taki	Minamiaiki			36°02′22″N 138°32′28″E		
Nakata Family Gardens 中田氏庭園; Nakata-shi teien	Matsumoto			36°12′56″N 137°58′27″E		
Sanbon Falls 三本滝; Sanbon-daki	Matsumoto			36°07′07″N 137°35′37″E		
Tadachi Falls 田立の滝; Tadachi-no-taki	Nagiso			35°37′45″N 137°32′49″E		
Okususobana Gorge 奥裾花峡谷; Okususobana keikoku	Nagano			36°40′08″N 138°06′51″E		
Yamaguchi Family Gardens 山口家庭園; Yamaguchi-shi teien	Azumino			36°18′37″N 137°50′29″E		

== Municipal Places of Scenic Beauty ==
As of 1 May 2020, eighty-two Places have been designated at a municipal level.

== Registered Places of Scenic Beauty ==
As of 1 January 2021, nine Monuments have been registered (as opposed to designated) as Places of Scenic Beauty at a national level.

Place	Municipality	Comments	Image	Coordinates	Type	Ref.
Imai Family Gardens 今井氏庭園; Imai-shi teien	Nagano			36°38′55″N 138°11′39″E		
Ōki Family Gardens 大木氏庭園; Ōki-shi teien	Nagano			36°33′32″N 138°11′47″E		
Former Yamadera Jōzan Family Gardens 旧山寺常山氏庭園 kyū-Yamadera Jōzan-shi teien	Nagano			36°33′28″N 138°11′49″E		
Kōzen-ji Gardens (Kanuntei) 興禅寺庭園（看雲庭） Kōzenji teien (Kanuntei)	Kiso			35°51′09″N 137°42′09″E		
Zōzan Jinja Gardens 象山神社園池; Zōzan Jinja enchi	Nagano			36°33′35″N 138°11′47″E		
Nagamine Family Gardens (Former Kawara Family Gardens) 長峯氏庭園（旧河原氏庭園） Nagamine-shi teien (kyū-Kawara-shi teien)	Nagano			36°33′30″N 138°11′49″E		
Nonaka Family Gardens 野中氏庭園; Nonaka-shi teien	Nagano			36°33′39″N 138°11′45″E		
Handa Family Gardens 半田氏庭園; Handa-shi teien	Nagano			36°38′55″N 138°11′39″E		
Miyazawa Family Gardens 宮澤氏庭園; Miyazawa-shi teien	Nagano			36°38′55″N 138°11′39″E		

== See also ==
- Cultural Property (Japan)
- List of parks and gardens of Nagano Prefecture
- List of Historic Sites of Japan (Nagano)
