= Agematsu =

Agematsu 上松町
- Town
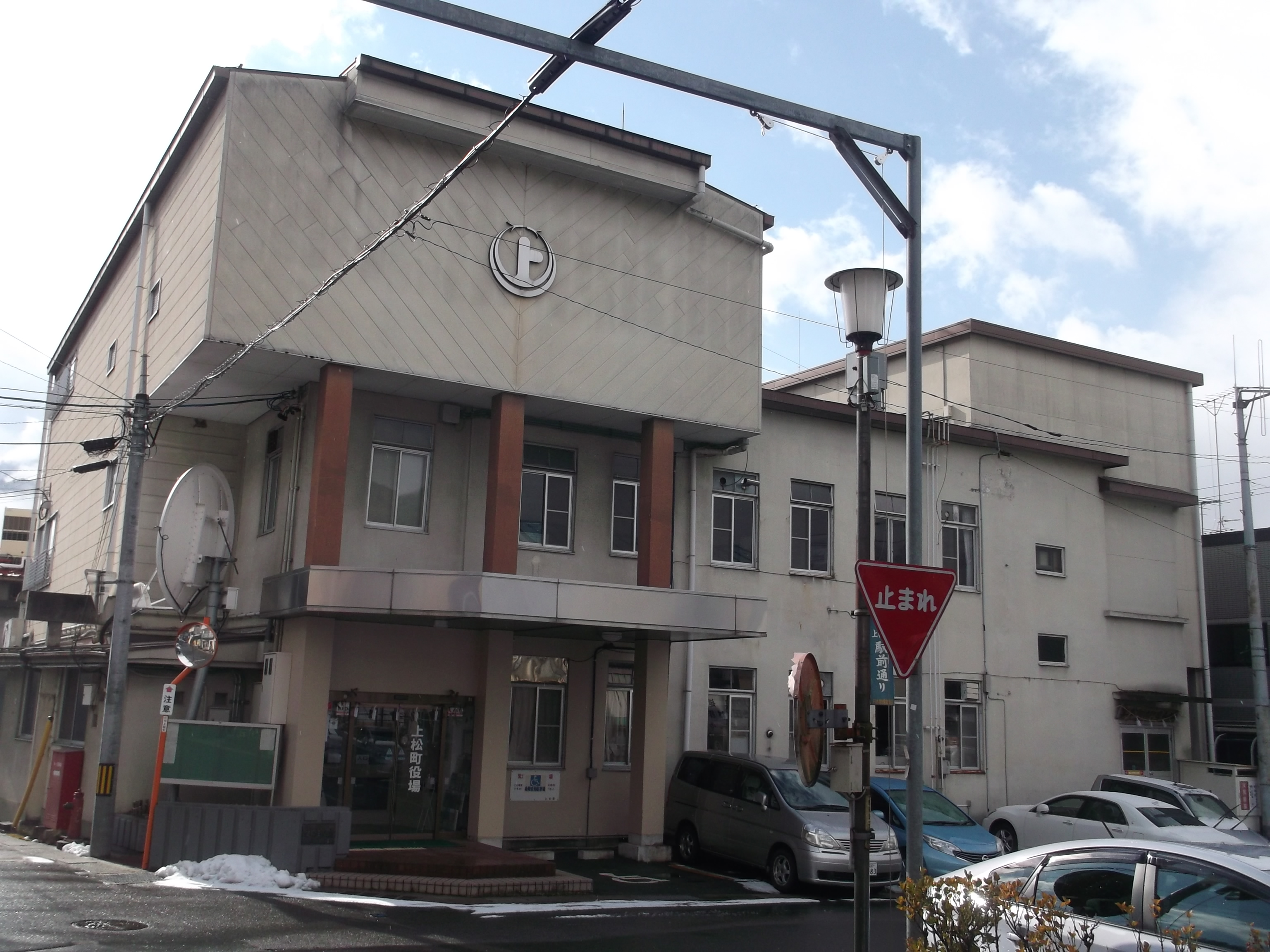
- Agematsu Town Hall

- Flag Seal

- Location of Agematsu in Nagano Prefecture

- Coordinates: 35°47′2.6″N 137°41′39.2″E
- Country: Japan
- Region: Chūbu (Kōshin'etsu)
- Prefecture: Nagano
- District: Kiso

Area
  - Total: 168.42 km^{2} (65.03 sq mi)

Population (March 2019)
  - Total: 4,451
  - Density: 26.43/km^{2} (68.45/sq mi)
- Time zone: UTC+9 (Japan Standard Time)
- Symbols
  - Tree: Chamaecyparis obtusa
  - Flower: Magnolia sieboldii, Lilium
  - Bird: Japanese robin
- Phone number: 0264-52-2001
- Address: 2-13 Eki-mae dori, Agematsu-machi, Kiso-gun, Nagano-ken 399-5603
- Website: Official website

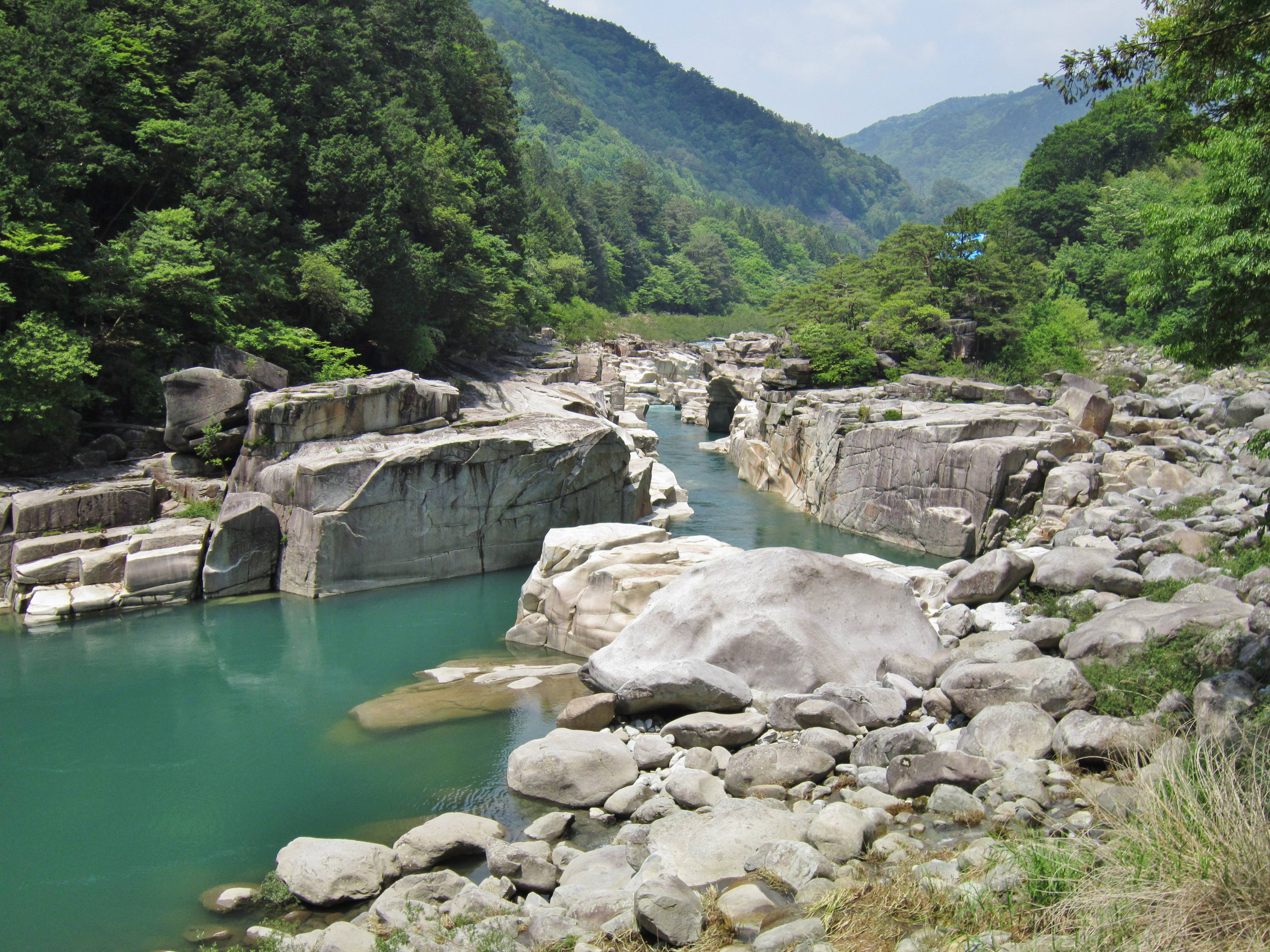
Nezame Gorge

Agematsu (上松町, Agematsu-machi) is a town in Nagano Prefecture, Japan. As of 31 March 2019, the town had an estimated population of 4,451 in 2091 households, and a population density of 26 persons per km^{2}. The total area of the town is 168.42 square kilometres (65.03 sq mi).

== Geography ==
Agematsu is in a mountainous area of south-western Nagano Prefecture, bordered by the Kiso Mountains to the north. The Kiso River flows through the town.

=== Surrounding municipalities ===
- Nagano Prefecture
  - Kiso
  - Komagane
  - Miyada
  - Ōkuwa
  - Ōtaki

=== Climate ===
The town has a climate characterized by hot and humid summers, and cold winters (Köppen climate classification Cfa). The average annual temperature in Agematsu is 10.1 °C. The average annual rainfall is 1676 mm with September as the wettest month. The temperatures are highest on average in August, at around 22.8 °C, and lowest in January, at around −2.2 °C.

== Demographics ==
Per Japanese census data, the population of Agematsu has been declining steadily over the past 60 years:

Historical population
Year	Pop.	±%
1940	7,943	—
1950	9,031	+13.7%
1960	9,643	+6.8%
1970	8,424	−12.6%
1980	7,654	−9.1%
1990	6,997	−8.6%
2000	6,376	−8.9%
2010	5,246	−17.7%
2020	4,131	−21.3%

== History ==
The area of present-day Agematsu was part of ancient Shinano Province. Agematsu-juku developed as a post station on the Nakasendō highway connecting Edo with Kyoto in the Edo period. The modern village of Komagane was established on April 1, 1889, by the establishment of the municipalities system. The village was divided into the towns of Komagane and Agematsu on September 3, 1922.

== Education ==
The town has one public elementary school and one public middle school operated by the town government. It does not have a high school. The Institute for Space–Earth Environmental Research of Nagoya University is in Agematsu.

== Transportation ==
=== Railway ===
- JR Tōkai - Chūō Main Line
  - Agematsu - Kuramoto

=== Highway ===
- National Route 19

== Local attractions ==
- Nezame no toko (Nezame Gorge), a Nationally designated Place of Scenic Beauty

== Notable people ==
- Mitakeumi Hisashi, professional sumo wrestler
